= 2022 ICF Canoe Sprint World Championships – Women's K-4 500 metres =

Canoe race in Dartmouth, Canada

Women's K-4 500 metres at the 2022 ICF Canoe Sprint World Championships
- Venue: Lake Banook
- Location: Dartmouth, Canada
- Dates: 3–6 August
- Competitors: 60 from 15 nations
- Winning time: 1:30.70

Medalists
gold medal	Karolina Naja; Anna Puławska; Adrianna Kąkol; Dominika Putto	Poland
silver medal	Ella Beere; Alyssa Bull; Alexandra Clarke; Yale Steinepreis	Australia
bronze medal	Karina Alanís; Isabel Romero; Beatriz Briones; Maricela Montemayor	Mexico

The women's K-4 500 metres competition at the 2022 ICF Canoe Sprint World Championships in Dartmouth took place on Lake Banook.

== Schedule ==
The schedule is as follows:

Date	Time	Round
Wednesday 3 August 2022	11:30	Heats
Friday 5 August 2022	10:15	Semifinal
Saturday 6 August 2022	11:10	Final

== Results ==
=== Heats ===
The fastest three boats in each heat advanced directly to the final.
The next four fastest boats in each heat, plus the fastest remaining boat advanced to the semifinal.

==== Heat 1 ====
Rank	Canoeist	Country	Time	Notes
1	Karolina Naja; Anna Puławska; Adrianna Kąkol; Dominika Putto	Poland	1:34.78	QF
2	Sara Ouzande; Carolina García; Laia Pèlachs; Teresa Portela	Spain	1:36.86	QF
3	Ella Beere; Alyssa Bull; Alexandra Clarke; Yale Steinepreis	Australia	1:36.95	QF
4	Karina Alanís; Isabel Romero; Beatriz Briones; Maricela Montemayor	Mexico	1:38.06	QS
5	Wang Nan; Sun Yuewen; Yang Luan; Chen Lingya	China	1:38.48	QS
6	Susanna Cicali; Mathilde Rosa; Cristina Petracca; Agata Fantini	Italy	1:39.16	QS
7	Andréanne Langlois; Natalie Davison; Riley Melanson; Toshka Hrebacka	Canada	1:40.63	QS

==== Heat 2 ====
Rank	Canoeist	Country	Time	Notes
1	Alicia Hoskin; Lisa Carrington; Olivia Brett; Tara Vaughan	New Zealand	1:36.70	QF
2	Lena Röhlings; Caroline Arft; Pauline Jagsch; Katharina Diederichs	Germany	1:37.45	QF
3	Sára Fojt; Noémi Pupp; Emese Kőhalmi; Alida Dóra Gazsó	Hungary	1:37.61	QF
4	Frederikke Matthiesen; Sara Milthers; Pernille Knudsen; Bolette Iversen	Denmark	1:37.88	QS
5	Deborah Kerr; Emma Russell; Emily Lewis; Rebeka Simon	Great Britain	1:38.50	QS
6	Kateřina Zárubová; Barbora Betlachová; Štěpánka Sobíšková; Adela Házová	Czech Republic	1:39.84	QS
7	Wies Siffels; Selma Konijn; Kitty Preuper; Anna Mus	Netherlands	1:41.51	QS
8	Elena Wolgamot; Kali Wilding; Kaitlyn McElroy; Emma McDonald	United States	1:45.51	qS

=== Semifinal ===
The fastest three boats advanced to the final.

Rank	Canoeist	Country	Time	Notes
1	Karina Alanís; Isabel Romero; Beatriz Briones; Maricela Montemayor	Mexico	1:37.84	QF
2	Deborah Kerr; Emma Russell; Emily Lewis; Rebeka Simon	Great Britain	1:38.21	QF
3	Andréanne Langlois; Natalie Davison; Riley Melanson; Toshka Hrebacka	Canada	1:38.42	QF
4	Susanna Cicali; Mathilde Rosa; Cristina Petracca; Agata Fantini	Italy	1:39.26	
5	Frederikke Matthiesen; Sara Milthers; Pernille Knudsen; Bolette Iversen	Denmark	1:39.27	
6	Wang Nan; Sun Yuewen; Yang Luan; Chen Lingya	China	1:39.73	
7	Kateřina Zárubová; Barbora Betlachová; Štěpánka Sobíšková; Adela Házová	Czech Republic	1:41.42	
8	Wies Siffels; Selma Konijn; Kitty Preuper; Anna Mus	Netherlands	1:41.98	
9	Elena Wolgamot; Kali Wilding; Kaitlyn McElroy; Emma McDonald	United States	1:47.31	

=== Final ===
Competitors raced for positions 1 to 9, with medals going to the top three.

Rank	Canoeist	Country	Time
1st place, gold medalist(s)	Karolina Naja; Anna Puławska; Adrianna Kąkol; Dominika Putto	Poland	1:30.70
2nd place, silver medalist(s)	Ella Beere; Alyssa Bull; Alexandra Clarke; Yale Steinepreis	Australia	1:32.78
3rd place, bronze medalist(s)	Karina Alanís; Isabel Romero; Beatriz Briones; Maricela Montemayor	Mexico	1:33.24
4	Sara Ouzande; Carolina García; Laia Pèlachs; Teresa Portela	Spain	1:33.27
5	Alicia Hoskin; Lisa Carrington; Olivia Brett; Tara Vaughan	New Zealand	1:33.39
6	Sára Fojt; Noémi Pupp; Emese Kőhalmi; Alida Dóra Gazsó	Hungary	1:34.11
7	Lena Röhlings; Caroline Arft; Pauline Jagsch; Katharina Diederichs	Germany	1:34.20
8	Deborah Kerr; Emma Russell; Emily Lewis; Rebeka Simon	Great Britain	1:34.45
9	Andréanne Langlois; Natalie Davison; Riley Melanson; Toshka Hrebacka	Canada	1:35.69
