= Canoeing at the 2024 Summer Olympics =

Canoeing at the Games of the XXXIII Olympiad
- Canoe slalom (left) and Canoe sprint (right)
- Venue: Stade d'eau vive Vaires-sur-Marne, National Olympic Nautical Stadium of Île-de-France, Vaires-sur-Marne
- Dates: 27 July – 5 August 2024 (slalom); 6–10 August 2024 (sprint)
- No. of events: 16 (8 men, 8 women)
- Competitors: 199 from 58 nations

Canoeing competitions at the 2024 Summer Olympics in Paris ran across two main disciplines: canoe slalom, which took place from 27 July to 5 August, and canoe sprint, from 6 to 10 August. Both canoe slalom and sprint events were staged at the Stade d'eau vive Vaires-sur-Marne, National Olympic Nautical Stadium of Île-de-France in Vaires-sur-Marne.

Similar to the previous editions, the competition featured sixteen events with several significant changes to the program lineup. The men's C-2 and K-2 1000 metres were replaced with half of its distance, the men's C-2 and K-2 500 metres, to align with the women's side of the program. Paris 2024 also signified the debut of the men's and women's slalom kayak cross event, as part of the Olympic movement toward gender equality, substituting the men's and women's K-1 200-metre sprint races.

== Qualification ==
The International Olympic Committee and the International Canoe Federation have released a new qualification system for both slalom and sprint canoeing at the 2024 Summer Olympics.

== Participating Nations ==
A total of 255 boats, 300 canoeists or kayakers competed from 58 NOCs.

- Algeria (1)
- Andorra (1)
- Angola (2)
- Argentina (2)
- Australia (15)
- Austria (2)
- Belgium (3)
- Brazil (8)
- Bulgaria (1)
- Canada (15)
- Chile (2)
- China (17)
- Colombia (1)
- Comoros (1)
- Croatia (2)
- Cuba (3)
- Czech Republic (9)
- Denmark (6)
- Egypt (1)
- France (13) Host
- Germany (21)
- Great Britain (4)
- Guam (1)
- Hungary (15)
- Iran (2)
- Ireland (3)
- Italy (6)
- Japan (3)
- Kazakhstan (6)
- Lithuania (5)
- Mexico (3)
- Moldova (3)
- Morocco (2)
- Netherlands (3)
- New Zealand (13)
- Nigeria (2)
- Norway (4)
- Poland (16)
- Portugal (4)
- Refugee Olympic Team (4)
- Romania (3)
- Samoa (2)
- São Tomé and Príncipe (1)
- Senegal (2)
- Serbia (8)
- Singapore (1)
- Slovakia (4)
- Slovenia (4)
- South Africa (5)
- Spain (19)
- Sweden (5)
- Switzerland (2)
- Chinese Taipei (3)
- Tunisia (2)
- Ukraine (8)
- United States (5)
- Uruguay (1)
- Uzbekistan (3)
- Vietnam (1)

== Competition schedule ==
Legend
TT	Time trial	R1	Round 1	H	Heats	¼	Quarter-finals	½	Semi-finals	SF	Small final	F	Medal final

Slalom
Event↓/Date →	Sat 27	Sun 28		Mon 29		Tue 30	Wed 31		Thu 1		Fri 2	Sat 3	Sun 4	Mon 5			
Men's C-1	H			½	F												
Men's K-1						H			½	F							
Men's kayak cross											TT	R1	H	¼	½	SF	F
Women's C-1						H	½	F									
Women's K-1	H	½	F														
Women's kayak cross											TT	R1	H	¼	½	SF	F

Sprint
Event↓/Date →	Tue 6		Wed 7		Thu 8		Fri 9		Sat 10	
Men's C-1 1000 m			H	¼			½	F		
Men's C-2 500 m	H	¼			½	F				
Men's K-1 1000 m			H	¼					½	F
Men's K-2 500 m	H	¼					½	F		
Men's K-4 500 m	H				½	F				
Women's C-1 200 m					H	¼			½	F
Women's C-2 500 m	H	¼					½	F		
Women's K-1 500 m			H	¼					½	F
Women's K-2 500 m	H	¼					½	F		
Women's K-4 500 m	H				½	F				

== Medal summary ==
=== Medal table ===
* Host nation (France)

Rank	NOC	Gold	Silver	Bronze	Total
1	New Zealand	4	0	0	4
2	Australia	3	1	1	5
3	Germany	2	2	2	6
4	China	2	0	0	2
4	Czech Republic	2	0	0	2
6	France*	1	2	0	3
7	Italy	1	1	0	2
8	Canada	1	0	1	2
9	Hungary	0	4	3	7
10	Great Britain	0	2	2	4
11	United States	0	1	1	2
12	Brazil	0	1	0	1
12	Poland	0	1	0	1
12	Ukraine	0	1	0	1
15	Spain	0	0	3	3
16	Cuba	0	0	1	1
16	Denmark	0	0	1	1
16	Moldova	0	0	1	1
16	Slovakia	0	0	1	1
Totals (19 entries)		16	16	17	49

=== Slalom ===
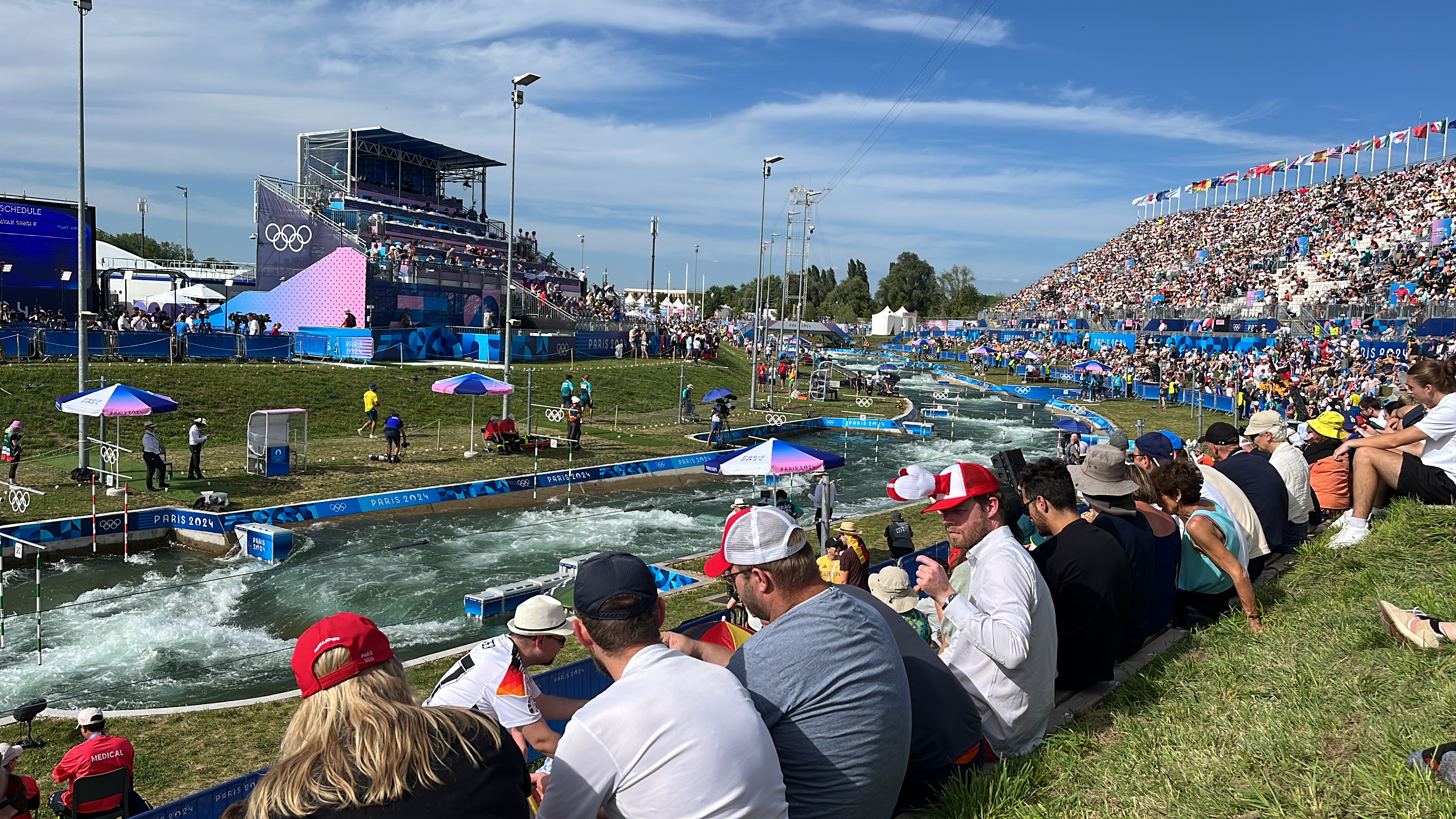
Canoe slalom venue

Event	Gold	Silver	Bronze
Men's C-1	Nicolas Gestin; France	Adam Burgess; Great Britain	Matej Beňuš; Slovakia
Men's K-1	Giovanni De Gennaro; Italy	Titouan Castryck; France	Pau Echaniz; Spain
Men's Kayak cross	Finn Butcher; New Zealand	Joe Clarke; Great Britain	Noah Hegge; Germany
Women's C-1	Jessica Fox; Australia	Elena Lilik; Germany	Evy Leibfarth; United States
Women's K-1	Jessica Fox; Australia	Klaudia Zwolińska; Poland	Kimberley Woods; Great Britain
Women's Kayak cross	Noemie Fox; Australia	Angèle Hug; France	Kimberley Woods; Great Britain

=== Sprint ===
Men

Event	Gold		Silver		Bronze	
C-1 1000 metres	Martin Fuksa; Czech Republic	3:43.16	Isaquias Queiroz; Brazil	3:44.33	Serghei Tarnovschi; Moldova	3:44.68
C-2 500 metres	China; Liu Hao; Ji Bowen	1:39.48	Italy; Gabriele Casadei; Carlo Tacchini	1:41.08	Spain; Joan Antoni Moreno; Diego Domínguez	1:41.18
K-1 1000 metres	Josef Dostál; Czech Republic	3:24.07	Ádám Varga; Hungary	3:24.76	Bálint Kopasz; Hungary	3:25.68
K-2 500 metres	Germany; Jacob Schopf; Max Lemke	1:26.87	Hungary; Bence Nádas; Sándor Tótka	1:27.15	Australia; Jean van der Westhuyzen; Thomas Green	1:27.29
K-4 500 metres	Germany; Max Rendschmidt; Max Lemke; Jacob Schopf; Tom Liebscher	1:19.80	Australia; Riley Fitzsimmons; Pierre van der Westhuyzen; Jackson Collins; Noah Havard	1:19.84	Spain; Saúl Craviotto; Carlos Arévalo; Marcus Cooper Walz; Rodrigo Germade	1:20.05

Women

Event	Gold		Silver		Bronze	
C-1 200 metres	Katie Vincent; Canada	44.12 WB	Nevin Harrison; United States	44.13	Yarisleidis Cirilo; Cuba	44.36
C-2 500 metres	China; Xu Shixiao; Sun Mengya	1:52.81	Ukraine; Liudmyla Luzan; Anastasiia Rybachok	1:54.30	Canada; Sloan MacKenzie; Katie Vincent	1:54.36
K-1 500 metres	Lisa Carrington; New Zealand	1:47.36 OB	Tamara Csipes; Hungary	1:48.44	Emma Jørgensen; Denmark	1:49.76
K-2 500 metres	New Zealand; Lisa Carrington; Alicia Hoskin	1:37.28	Hungary; Tamara Csipes; Alida Dóra Gazsó	1:39.39	Germany; Paulina Paszek; Jule Hake	1:39.46
K-2 500 metres	New Zealand; Lisa Carrington; Alicia Hoskin	1:37.28	Hungary; Tamara Csipes; Alida Dóra Gazsó	1:39.39	Hungary; Noémi Pupp; Sára Fojt	1:39.46
K-4 500 metres	New Zealand; Lisa Carrington; Alicia Hoskin; Olivia Brett; Tara Vaughan	1:32.20	Germany; Paulina Paszek; Jule Hake; Pauline Jagsch; Sarah Brüßler	1:32.62	Hungary; Noémi Pupp; Sára Fojt; Tamara Csipes; Alida Dóra Gazsó	1:32.93

== See also ==
- Canoeing at the 2022 Asian Games
- Canoe slalom at the 2023 European Games
- Canoe sprint at the 2023 European Games
- Canoeing at the 2023 Pan American Games
- Outrigger canoeing at the 2023 Pacific Games
- Paracanoeing at the 2024 Summer Paralympics
