= 2023 ICF Canoe Sprint World Championships – Women's K-4 500 metres =

Women's K-4 500 metres at the 2023 ICF Canoe Sprint World Championships
- Venue: Sportpark Duisburg
- Location: Duisburg, Germany
- Dates: 23-25 August
- Competitors: 104 from 26 nations
- Winning time: 1:30.606

Medalists
gold medal	Lisa Carrington; Alicia Hoskin; Olivia Brett; Tara Vaughan	New Zealand
silver medal	Karolina Naja; Anna Puławska; Adrianna Kakol; Dominika Putto	Poland
bronze medal	Sara Ouzande; Estefania Fernandez; Carolina Garcia Otero; Teresa Portela	Spain

The women's K-4 500 metres competition at the 2023 ICF Canoe Sprint World Championships in Duisburg took place in Sportpark Duisburg.

== Schedule ==
The schedule is as follows:

Date	Time	Round
Wednesday 23 August 2023	12:19	Heats
Friday 25 August 2023	13:45	Semifinals
Friday 25 August 2023	18:17	Final A
Friday 25 August 2023	19:13	Final B

== Results ==
=== Heats ===
The fastest boat in each heat advanced directly to the final A.
The next six fastest boats in each heat advanced to semifinals.

==== Heat 1 ====
Rank	Canoeist	Country	Time	Notes
1	Sara Ouzande; Estefania Fernandez; Carolina Garcia Otero; Teresa Portela	Spain	1:30.474	QA
2	Lisa Carrington; Alicia Hoskin; Olivia Brett; Tara Vaughan	New Zealand	1:30.658	QS
3	Lena Röhlings; Katinka Hofmann; Sarah Brüßler; Enja Rößeling	Germany	1:32.488	QS
4	Anastazija Bajuk; Marija Dostanić; Milica Novaković; Dunja Stanojev	Serbia	1:34.116	QS
5	Diana Tanko; Nataliia Dokiienko; Hanna Pavlova; Inna Hryshchun	Ukraine	1:34.338	QS
6	Sara Daldoss; Lucrezia Zironi; Irene Bellan; Sara Vesentini	Italy	1:34.447	QS
7	Claire Bren; Pauline Freslon; Margot Maillet; Léa Jamelot	France	1:36.299	QS
8	Elena Wolgamot; Kali Wilding; Emma McDonald; Mehana Leafchild	United States	1:39.260	
9	Maira Toro; Daniela Castillo; Ysumy Orellana; Fernanda Iracheta	Chile	1:41.650	

==== Heat 2 ====
Rank	Canoeist	Country	Time	Notes
1	Karolina Naja; Anna Puławska; Adrianna Kąkol; Dominika Putto	Poland	1:31.457	QA
2	Katrine Jensen; Sara Milthers; Pernille Knudsen; Bolette Nyvang Iversen	Denmark	1:34.023	QS
3	Karina Alanís; Isabel Aburto; Beatriz Briones; Maricela Montemayor	Mexico	1:34.158	QS
4	Anežka Paloudová; Kateřina Zárubová; Barbora Betlachová; Adéla Házová	Czech Republic	1:34.736	QS
5	Francisca Laia; Teresa Portela; Joana Vasconcelos; Maria Rei	Portugal	1:34.953	QS
6	Selma Konijn; Wies Siffels; Ruth Vorsselman; Anna Mus	Netherlands	1:35.636	QS
7	Kamila Malakhova; Arina Tanatmisheva; Ekaterina Shubina; Yuliya Borzova	Uzbekistan	1:36.222	QS
8	Julia Lagerstam; Ardis Luda; Sofia Paldanius; Rebecka Georgsdotter	Sweden	1:36.444	
9	Soniya Devi Phairembam; Parvathy Geetha; Binita Chanu Oinam; Dimita Devi Toijam	India	1:45.335	

==== Heat 3 ====
Rank	Canoeist	Country	Time	Notes
1	Li Dongyin; Yin Mengdie; Wang Nan; Sun Yuewen	China	1:31.849	QA
2	Alida Dóra Gazsó; Tamara Csipes; Eszter Rendessy; Dora Hadvina	Hungary	1:32.037	QS
3	Ella Beere; Alyssa Bull; Alexandra Clarke; Yale Steinepreis	Australia	1:32.250	QS
4	Courtney Stott; Natalie Davison; Riley Melanson; Toshka Besharah	Canada	1:33.514	QS
5	Maria Virik; Anna Sletsjøe; Hedda Øritsland; Kristine Amundsen	Norway	1:33.548	QS
6	Deborah Kerr; Emma Russell; Emily Lewis; Rebeka Simon	Great Britain	1:33.662	QS
7	Katarína Pecsuková; Réka Bugár; Bianka Sidová; Mariana Petrušová	Slovakia	1:36.315	QS
8	Anastassiya Berezovskaya; Olga Shmelyova; Stella Sukhanova; Darya Petrova	Kazakhstan	1:37.974	

=== Semifinals ===
The fastest three boats in each semifinal advanced to the A final.
The next four fastest boats in each semifinal plus one fastest 8th boat advanced to the B final.

==== Semifinal 1 ====
Rank	Canoeist	Country	Time	Notes
1	Lisa Carrington; Alicia Hoskin; Olivia Brett; Tara Vaughan	New Zealand	1:31.882	QA
2	Ella Beere; Alyssa Bull; Alexandra Clarke; Yale Steinepreis	Australia	1:32.391	QA
3	Anastazija Bajuk; Marija Dostanić; Milica Novaković; Dunja Stanojev	Serbia	1:32.496	QA
4	Courtney Stott; Natalie Davison; Riley Melanson; Toshka Besharah	Canada	1:32.578	QB
5	Deborah Kerr; Emma Russell; Emily Lewis; Rebeka Simon	Great Britain	1:33.197	QB
6	Karina Alanís; Isabel Aburto; Beatriz Briones; Maricela Montemayor	Mexico	1:33.822	QB
7	Francisca Laia; Teresa Portela; Joana Vasconcelos; Maria Rei	Portugal	1:35.003	QB
8	Sara Daldoss; Lucrezia Zironi; Irene Bellan; Sara Vesentini	Italy	1:36.081	QB
9	Kamila Malakhova; Arina Tanatmisheva; Ekaterina Shubina; Yuliya Borzova	Uzbekistan	1:36.372	

==== Semifinal 2 ====
Rank	Canoeist	Country	Time	Notes
1	Lena Röhlings; Katinka Hofmann; Sarah Brüßler; Enja Rößeling	Germany	1:32.760	QA
2	Alida Dóra Gazsó; Tamara Csipes; Eszter Rendessy; Dora Hadvina	Hungary	1:33.118	QA
3	Maria Virik; Anna Sletsjøe; Hedda Øritsland; Kristine Amundsen	Norway	1:33.824	QA
4	Katrine Jensen; Sara Milthers; Pernille Knudsen; Bolette Nyvang Iversen	Denmark	1:34.529	QB
5	Diana Tanko; Nataliia Dokiienko; Hanna Pavlova; Inna Hryshchun	Ukraine	1:34.951	QB
6	Anežka Paloudová; Kateřina Zárubová; Barbora Betlachová; Adéla Házová	Czech Republic	1:35.254	QB
7	Selma Konijn; Wies Siffels; Ruth Vorsselman; Anna Mus	Netherlands	1:35.860	QB
8	Katarína Pecsuková; Réka Bugár; Bianka Sidová; Mariana Petrušová	Slovakia	1:36.128	
9	Claire Bren; Pauline Freslon; Margot Maillet; Léa Jamelot	France	1:37.623	

=== Finals ===
==== Final B ====
Competitors in this final raced for positions 10 to 18.

Rank	Canoeist	Country	Time
1	Courtney Stott; Natalie Davison; Riley Melanson; Toshka Besharah	Canada	1:32.760
2	Deborah Kerr; Emma Russell; Emily Lewis; Rebeka Simon	Great Britain	1:33.118
3	Karina Alanis; Isabel Aburto Romero; Beatriz Briones; Maricela Montemayor	Mexico	1:33.824
4	Diana Tanko; Nataliia Dokiienko; Hanna Pavlova; Inna Hryshchun	Ukraine	1:34.529
5	Katrine Jensen; Sara Milthers; Pernille Knudsen; Bolette Nyvang Iversen	Denmark	1:34.951
6	Anežka Paloudová; Kateřina Zárubová; Barbora Betlachová; Adéla Házová	Czech Republic	1:35.254
7	Selma Konijn; Wies Siffels; Ruth Vorsselman; Anna Mus	Netherlands	1:35.860
8	Sara Daldoss; Lucrezia Zironi; Irene Bellan; Sara Vesentini	Italy	1:36.128
9	Francisca Laia; Teresa Portela; Joana Vasconcelos; Maria Rei	Portugal	1:37.623

==== Final A ====
Competitors in this final raced for positions 1 to 9, with medals going to the top three.

Rank	Canoeist	Country	Time
1st place, gold medalist(s)	Lisa Carrington; Alicia Hoskin; Olivia Brett; Tara Vaughan	New Zealand	1:30.606
2nd place, silver medalist(s)	Karolina Naja; Anna Puławska; Adrianna Kąkol; Dominika Putto	Poland	1:31.320
3rd place, bronze medalist(s)	Sara Ouzande; Estefania Fernandez; Carolina Garcia Otero; Teresa Portela	Spain	1:31.955
4	Li Dongyin; Yin Mengdie; Wang Nan; Sun Yuewen	China	1:32.250
5	Ella Beere; Alyssa Bull; Alexandra Clarke; Yale Steinepreis	Australia	1:32.636
6	Anastazija Bajuk; Marija Dostanić; Milica Novaković; Dunja Stanojev	Serbia	1:32.738
7	Alida Dóra Gazsó; Tamara Csipes; Eszter Rendessy; Dora Hadvina	Hungary	1:33.151
8	Lena Röhlings; Katinka Hofmann; Sarah Brüßler; Enja Rößeling	Germany	1:33.433
9	Maria Virik; Anna Sletsjøe; Hedda Øritsland; Kristine Amundsen	Norway	1:34.461
