= Canoeing at the 2024 Summer Olympics – Women's K-4 500 metres =

Women's K-4 500 metres at the Games of the XXXIII Olympiad
- Venue: National Olympic Nautical Stadium of Île-de-France, Vaires-sur-Marne
- Dates: 6 August 2024 (heats); 8 August 2024 (semifinals & finals)
- Competitors: 40 from 10 nations

Medalists
1st place, gold medalist(s)		Lisa Carrington; Alicia Hoskin; Olivia Brett; Tara Vaughan	New Zealand
2nd place, silver medalist(s)		Paulina Paszek; Jule Hake; Pauline Jagsch; Sarah Brüßler	Germany
3rd place, bronze medalist(s)		Noémi Pupp; Sára Fojt; Tamara Csipes; Alida Dóra Gazsó	Hungary

The women's K-4 500 metres sprint canoeing event at the 2024 Summer Olympics took place on 6 and 8 August 2024 at the National Olympic Nautical Stadium of Île-de-France in Vaires-sur-Marne.

== Background ==
This will be the 11th appearance of the event after it was introduced at the 1984 Olympics.

== Competition format ==
Sprint canoeing uses a four-round format for events with 12 boats, with heats, quarterfinals semifinals, and finals. The specifics of the progression format depend on the number of boats ultimately entered.

- Heats: 2 heats of 6 boats each. The top 2 in each heat (4 boats total) advance directly to the semifinals. The remaining 8 boats compete in the quarterfinal.
- Quarterfinal: 1 heat of 8 boats. The top 6 advance to the semifinals. The remaining 2 boats compete in Final B, out of medal contention.
- Semifinals: 2 heats of 5 boats each. The top 4 in each heat (8 boats total) advance to Final A; the remaining 2 boats compete in Final B, out of medal contention.
- Final: 2 heats. Final A has the top 8 boats, awarding the medals and 4th through 8th place. Final B has the remaining 4 boats, ranking them 9th through 12th.

The course is a flatwater course 9 metres wide. The name of the event describes the particular format within sprint canoeing. The "K" format means a kayak, with the canoeist sitting, using a double-bladed paddle to paddle, and steering with a foot-operated rudder (as opposed to a canoe, with a kneeling canoeist, single-bladed paddle, and no rudder). The "4" is the number of canoeists in each boat. The "500 metres" is the distance of each race.

== Schedule ==
All times are Central European Summer Time (UTC+2)

The event will be held over two days.

Date	Time	Round
6 August 2024	10:00	Heats
8 August 2024	11:40; 13:40	Semifinals; Finals

== Results ==
=== Heats ===
Progression System: 1st-3rd to Final A, rest to SF.

==== Heat 1 ====
Rank	Lane	Crew	Country	Time	Notes
1	6	Lisa Carrington; Alicia Hoskin; Olivia Brett; Tara Vaughan	New Zealand	1:32.40	FA
2	4	Sara Ouzande; Estefanía Fernández; Carolina García; Teresa Portela	Spain	1:32.92	FA
3	5	Karolina Naja; Anna Puławska; Adrianna Kąkol; Dominika Putto	Poland	1:33.87	FA
4	7	Maria Virik; Anna Margrete Sletsjoe; Hedda Oritsland; Kristine Strand Amundsen	Norway	1:34.28	SF
5	3	Anastazija Bajuk; Milica Novaković; Marija Dostanić; Dunja Stanojev	Serbia	1:36.40	SF

==== Heat 2 ====
Rank	Lane	Crew	Country	Time	Notes
1	5	Paulina Paszek; Jule Hake; Pauline Jagsch; Sarah Brüßler	Germany	1:32.34	FA
2	6	Noémi Pupp; Sára Fojt; Tamara Csipes; Alida Dóra Gazsó	Hungary	1:33.42	FA
3	4	Li Dongyin; Yin Mengdie; Wang Nan; Sun Yuewen	China	1:33.64	FA
4	3	Ella Beere; Alyssa Bull; Alexandra Clarke; Yale Steinepreis	Australia	1:34.60	SF
5	7	Courtney Stott; Natalie Davison; Riley Melanson; Toshka Besharah-Hrebacka	Canada	1:37.87	SF

=== Semi Final ===
Progression System: 1st-2nd to Final, 3rd - 4th eliminated.

==== Semi Final ====
Rank	Lane	Crew	Country	Time	Notes
1	4	Ella Beere; Alyssa Bull; Alexandra Clarke; Yale Steinpreis	Australia	1:34.25	FA
2	5	Maria Virik; Anna Margrete Sletsjoe; Hedda Oritsland; Kristine Strand Amundsen	Norway	1:34.77	FA
3	3	Anastazija Bajuk; Milica Novaković; Marija Dostanić; Dunja Stanojev	Serbia	1:35.25	
4	6	Courtney Stott; Natalie Davison; Riley Melanson; Toshka Besharah-Hrebacka	Canada	1:39.24	

=== Final ===
Rank	Lane	Crew	Country	Time	Notes
1st place, gold medalist(s)	5	Lisa Carrington; Alicia Hoskin; Olivia Brett; Tara Vaughan	New Zealand	1:32.20	
2nd place, silver medalist(s)	4	Paulina Paszek; Jule Hake; Pauline Jagsch; Sarah Brüßler	Germany	1:32.62	
3rd place, bronze medalist(s)	6	Noémi Pupp; Sára Fojt; Tamara Csipes; Alida Dóra Gazsó	Hungary	1:32.93	
4	7	Karolina Naja; Anna Puławska; Adrianna Kąkol; Dominika Putto	Poland	1:33.17	
5	2	Li Dongyin; Yin Mengdie; Wang Nan; Sun Yuewen	China	1:33.57	
6	3	Sara Ouzande; Estefanía Fernández; Carolina García; Teresa Portela	Spain	1:34.51	
7	1	Maria Virik; Anna Margrete Sletsjoe; Hedda Oritsland; Kristine Strand Amundsen	Norway	1:35.02	
8	8	Ella Beere; Alyssa Bull; Alexandra Clarke; Yale Steinpreis	Australia	1:35.96	
