= New Zealand at the 2024 Summer Olympics =

- IOC code: NZL
- NOC: New Zealand Olympic Committee
- Website: www.olympic.org.nz

in Paris, France 26 July 2024 – 11 August 2024
- Competitors: 195 (98 men and 97 women) in 22 sports
- Flag bearers (opening): Jo Aleh & Aaron Gate
- Flag bearers (closing): Finn Butcher & Lisa Carrington
- Officials: Nigel Avery (chef de mission)
- Medals Ranked 11th: Gold 10 Silver 7 Bronze 3 Total 20

Summer Olympics appearances (overview)
- 1908; 1912; 1920; 1924; 1928; 1932; 1936; 1948; 1952; 1956; 1960; 1964; 1968; 1972; 1976; 1980; 1984; 1988; 1992; 1996; 2000; 2004; 2008; 2012; 2016; 2020; 2024; 2028

Other related appearances
- Australasia (1908–1912)

New Zealand competed at the 2024 Summer Olympics in Paris from 26 July to 11 August 2024. It was the country's 25th appearance as an independent nation at the Summer Olympics, having made its debut at the 1920 Summer Olympics in Antwerp and competed at every Games since. It is New Zealand's most successful Olympic Games, matching their previously highest medal total of 20 from the 2020 Summer Olympics in Tokyo, and breaking their previous Gold medal total of 8 from the 1984 Summer Olympics in Los Angeles.

== Medallists ==
The following New Zealand competitors won medals at the games. In the discipline sections below, the medallists' names are bolded.

Medal	Name	Sport	Event	Date
Gold	New Zealand women's national rugby sevens team: Michaela Blyde; Jazmin Hotham; Sarah Hirini (c); Tyla King; Jorja Miller; Manaia Nuku; Mahina Paul; Risi Pouri-Lane; Alena Saili; Theresa Fitzpatrick; Stacey Waaka; Portia Woodman	Rugby sevens	Women's tournament	30 July
Gold	Brooke Francis; Lucy Spoors	Rowing	Women's double sculls	1 August
Gold	Finn Butcher	Canoeing	Men's kayak cross	5 August
Gold	Olivia Brett; Lisa Carrington; Alicia Hoskin; Tara Vaughan	Canoeing	K-4 500 m	8 August
Gold	Ellesse Andrews	Cycling	Women's keirin	8 August
Gold	Lisa Carrington; Alicia Hoskin	Canoeing	K-2 500 m	9 August
Gold	Hamish Kerr	Athletics	Men's high jump	10 August
Gold	Lisa Carrington	Canoeing	K-1 500 m	10 August
Gold	Lydia Ko	Golf	Women's tournament	10 August
Gold	Ellesse Andrews	Cycling	Women's sprint	11 August
Silver	Hayden Wilde	Triathlon	Men's individual	31 July
Silver	Matt Macdonald; Ollie Maclean; Tom Murray; Logan Ullrich	Rowing	Men's four	1 August
Silver	Isaac McHardie; William McKenzie	Sailing	49er	2 August
Silver	Emma Twigg	Rowing	Women's single sculls	3 August
Silver	Ellesse Andrews; Shaane Fulton; Rebecca Petch	Cycling	Women's team sprint	5 August
Silver	Ally Wollaston; Bryony Botha; Emily Shearman; Nicole Shields	Cycling	Women's team pursuit	7 August
Silver	Maddi Wesche	Athletics	Women's shot put	9 August
Bronze	Jackie Gowler; Phoebe Spoors; Davina Waddy; Kerri Williams	Rowing	Women's four	1 August
Bronze	Micah Wilkinson; Erica Dawson	Sailing	Mixed Nacra 17	8 August
Bronze	Ally Wollaston	Cycling	Women's omnium	11 August

Medals by sport
Sport	1st place, gold medalist(s)	2nd place, silver medalist(s)	3rd place, bronze medalist(s)	Total
Canoeing	4	0	0	**4**
Cycling	2	2	1	**5**
Rowing	1	2	1	**4**
Athletics	1	1	0	**2**
Golf	1	0	0	**1**
Rugby sevens	1	0	0	**1**
Sailing	0	1	1	**2**
Triathlon	0	1	0	**1**
Total	10	7	3	20

Medals by day
Day	Date	1st place, gold medalist(s)	2nd place, silver medalist(s)	3rd place, bronze medalist(s)	Total
4	30 July	1	0	0	**1**
5	31 July	0	1	0	**1**
6	1 August	1	1	1	**3**
7	2 August	0	1	0	**1**
8	3 August	0	1	0	**1**
10	5 August	1	1	0	**2**
12	7 August	0	1	0	**1**
13	8 August	2	0	1	**3**
14	9 August	1	1	0	**2**
15	10 August	3	0	0	**3**
16	11 August	1	0	1	**2**
Total		10	7	3	20

Medals by gender
Gender	1st place, gold medalist(s)	2nd place, silver medalist(s)	3rd place, bronze medalist(s)	Total
Female	8	4	2	**14**
Male	2	3	0	**5**
Mixed	0	0	1	**1**
Total	10	7	3	20

Multiple medalists
Name	Sport	1st place, gold medalist(s)	2nd place, silver medalist(s)	3rd place, bronze medalist(s)	Total
Lisa Carrington	Canoeing	3	0	0	**3**
Ellesse Andrews	Cycling	2	1	0	**3**
Alicia Hoskin	Canoeing	2	0	0	**2**
Ally Wollaston	Cycling	0	1	1	**2**

== Officials ==
Nigel Avery was the chef de mission for New Zealand at the Games.

== Competitors ==
The following is the list of number of competitors in the Games.

Sport	Men	Women	Total
Artistic swimming	0	2	2
Athletics	8	9	17
Canoeing	5	7	12
Cycling	9	11	20
Diving	0	1	1
Equestrian	2	2	4
Field hockey	16	0	16
Football	18	18	36
Golf	2	1	3
Gymnastics	1	2	3
Judo	0	2	2
Rowing	9	11	20
Rugby sevens	12	12	24
Sailing	6	6	12
Shooting	1	1	2
Sport climbing	1	1	2
Surfing	1	1	2
Swimming	4	5	9
Tennis	0	2	2
Triathlon	2	2	4
Weightlifting	1	0	1
Wrestling	0	1	1
Total	98	97	195

== Artistic swimming ==
New Zealand fielded a pair of artistic swimmers to compete in the women's duet as the highest-ranked Oceanian nation eligible for qualification at the 2023 FINA World Championships in Fukuoka, Japan.

Athlete	Event	Technical routine		Free routine (final)		
Athlete	Event	Points	Rank	Points	Total (technical + free)	Rank
Nina Brown; Eva Morris	Duet	188.0901	17	166.5105	354.6006	17

== Athletics ==
New Zealand track and field athletes achieved the entry standards for Paris 2024, either by passing the direct qualifying mark (or time for track and road races) or by world ranking, in the following events (a maximum of 3 athletes each):

Key

- Note–Ranks given for track events are within the athlete's heat only
- Q = Qualified for the next round
- q = Qualified for the next round as a fastest loser or, in field events, by position without achieving the qualifying target
- R = Qualified for the repechage round
- NR = National record
- N/A = Round not applicable for the event
- Bye = Athlete not required to compete in round

=== Track and road ===
Athlete	Event	Preliminary		Heat		Repechage		Semifinal		Final	
Athlete	Event	Time	Rank	Time	Rank	Time	Rank	Time	Rank	Time	Rank
James Preston	Men's 800 m	—N/a		1:48.50	8 R	1:50.53	6	Did not advance			
Sam Tanner	Men's 1500 m	—N/a		3:39.87	13 R	3:40.71	13	Did not advance			
Geordie Beamish	Men's 3000 m steeplechase	—N/a		8:25.86	7	—N/a				Did not advance	
Zoe Hobbs	Women's 100 m	Bye		11.08	2 Q	—N/a		11.13	7	Did not advance	
Maia Ramsden	Women's 1500 m	—N/a		4:02.83	6 Q	—N/a		4:02.20 NR	8	Did not advance	
Camille Buscomb	Women's marathon	—N/a								2:37.21	60

=== Field ===
Athlete	Event	Qualification		Final	
Athlete	Event	Result	Rank	Result	Rank
Hamish Kerr	Men's high jump	2.27	2 q	2.36	1st place, gold medalist(s)
Ethan Olivier	Men's triple jump	16.16	15	Did not advance	
Jacko Gill	Men's shot put	21.35m	6 Q	21.15	7
Tom Walsh	Men's shot put	21.48m	5 Q	NM	
Connor Bell	Men's discus throw	62.88	13	Did not advance	
Imogen Ayris	Women's pole vault	4.40	=12 q	4.60	12
Eliza McCartney	Women's pole vault	4.55	=9 q	4.70	6
Olivia McTaggart	Women's pole vault	4.40	=12 q	4.60	13
Maddi Wesche	Women's shot put	19.25	2 Q	19.86	2nd place, silver medalist(s)
Lauren Bruce	Women's hammer throw	68.93	20	Did not advance	
Tori Peeters	Women's javelin throw	59.78	19	Did not advance	

== Canoeing ==
=== Slalom ===
New Zealand entered four boats into the slalom competition, for the Games through the 2023 ICF Canoe Slalom World Championships in London, Great Britain, and 2024 Oceania Championships in Penrith, Australia.

Athlete	Event	Preliminary						Semifinal		Final	
Athlete	Event	Run 1	Rank	Run 2	Rank	Best	Rank	Time	Rank	Time	Rank
Finn Butcher	Men's K-1	86.35	5	142.08	24	86.35	7 Q	146.40	19	Did not advance	
Luuka Jones	Women's K-1	102.90	19	97.13	13	97.13	15 Q	104.91	9 Q	104.33	8

Kayak cross

Athlete	Event	Time trial		Round 1	Repechage	Heat	Quarterfinal	Semifinal	Final	
Athlete	Event	Time	Rank	Position	Position	Position	Position	Position	Position	Rank
Finn Butcher	Men's KX-1	67.74	6	1 Q	Bye	1 Q	1 Q	2 F	1	1st place, gold medalist(s)
Luuka Jones	Women's KX-1	72.10	4	2 Q	Bye	1 Q	2 Q	4 S	1	5

Key: Q – Qualify to next round; R – Qualify to repechage round; F – Qualify to medal final; S – Qualify to non-medal final

=== Sprint ===
New Zealand canoeists qualified boats in each of the following distances for the Games through the 2023 ICF Canoe Sprint World Championships in Duisburg, Germany; and 2024 Oceania Canoe Sprint Qualifier in Penrith, Australia.

Men

Athlete	Event	Heats		Quarterfinals		Semifinals		Final	
Athlete	Event	Time	Rank	Time	Rank	Time	Rank	Time	Rank
Max Brown; Grant Clancy	C-2 500 m	2:22.09	7 QF	2:24.09	5 FB	Bye		2:31.04	13
Kurtis Imrie; Hamish Legarth	K-2 500 m	1:41.18	5 QF	1:30.29	4 SF	1:30.26	7 FB	1:32.09	6
Max Brown; Grant Clancy; Kurtis Imrie; Hamish Legarth	K-4 500 m	1:23.26	4 QF	1:20.56	2 SF	1:21.73	4 FA	1:22.19	8

Women

Athlete	Event	Heats		Quarterfinals		Semifinals		Final	
Athlete	Event	Time	Rank	Time	Rank	Time	Rank	Time	Rank
Lisa Carrington	K-1 500 m	1:48.51	1 SF	Bye		1:48.10	1 FA	1:47.36	1st place, gold medalist(s)
Aimee Fisher	K-1 500 m	1:49.16	1 SF	Bye		1:49.54	1 FA	1:49.91	4
Lisa Carrington; Alicia Hoskin	K-2 500 m	1:41.05	1 SF	Bye		1:38.52	1 FA	1:37.28	1st place, gold medalist(s)
Aimee Fisher; Lucy Matehaere	K-2 500 m	1:46.52	4 QF	1:44.45	5	Did not advance			
Olivia Brett; Lisa Carrington; Alicia Hoskin; Tara Vaughan	K-4 500 m	1:32.40	1 FA	—N/a		Bye		1:32.20	1st place, gold medalist(s)

Qualification Legend: FA – Qualify to final (medal); FB – Qualify to final B (non-medal); SF – Qualify to Semifinals; QF – Qualify to Quarterfinals

== Cycling ==
=== Road ===
New Zealand entered four road cyclists (two male and two female) into the games. New Zealand secured those quota through the UCI Nation Ranking.

Athlete	Event	Time	Rank
Laurence Pithie	Men's road race	6:26:57	39
Corbin Strong	Men's road race	6:22:31	27
Laurence Pithie	Men's time trial	38:49.76	24
Niamh Fisher-Black	Women's road race	4:04:23	31
Kim Cadzow	Women's road race	4:08:14	56
Kim Cadzow	Women's time trial	41:46.02	7

=== Track ===
New Zealand entered a full squad of men's team pursuit, madison, omnium, sprint, keirin; and women's track events, following the release of the final UCI Olympic rankings.

Sprint

Athlete	Event	Qualification		Round 1	Repechage 1	Round 2	Repechage 2	Round 3	Repechage 3	Quarterfinals	Semifinals	Finals / BM	
Athlete	Event	Time Speed (km/h)	Rank	Opposition Time Speed (km/h)	Opposition Time Speed (km/h)	Opposition Time Speed (km/h)	Opposition Time Speed (km/h)	Opposition Time Speed (km/h)	Opposition Time Speed (km/h)	Opposition Time Speed (km/h)	Opposition Time Speed (km/h)	Opposition Time Speed (km/h)	Rank
Sam Dakin	Men's sprint	9.470; 76.030	14 Q	Rudyk (POL); L 9.926; 72.683	Lithuania; Malaysia; L	Did not advance							
Ellesse Andrews	Women's sprint	10.108	3 Q	Bao (CHN); W 10.986; 65.538	Bye	Kouamé (FRA); W 11.271; 63.881	Bye	Mitchell (CAN); W 10.917; 65.952	Bye	Hinze (GER); W 10.746; 67.002; W 10.795; 66.698	Finucane (GBR); W 10.565; 68.150; W 10.710; 67.227 FA	Friedrich (GER); W 10.685; 67.384; W 10.516; 68.467	1st place, gold medalist(s)
Shaane Fulton	Women's sprint	10.281	9 Q	Vece (ITA); W 10.933; 65.856	Bye	van de Wouw (NED); L 10.770; 66.860	Genest (CAN); W 10.875; 66.207	Capewell (GBR); L 10.815; 66.603	Colombia; France; L	Did not advance			
Ellesse Andrews; Shaane Fulton; Rebecca Petch	Women's team sprint	45.593; 59.220	2 Q	—N/a							Poland; W 45.348–47.022; 59.540 FA	Great Britain; L 45.659–45.186; 59.134	2nd place, silver medalist(s)

Qualification legend: Q – Qualify to next round; FA – Gold medal final; FB – Bronze medal final; FC – Fifth place final; FD – Seventh place final

Pursuit

Athlete	Event	Qualification		Semifinals		Final	
Athlete	Event	Time	Rank	Opponent Results	Rank	Opponent Results	Rank
Aaron Gate; Keegan Hornblow; Tom Sexton; Campbell Stewart	Men's team pursuit	3:45.616	6 q	Belgium; W 3:43.776–3:45.685; 64.350	1 FC	France; W 3:44.741–3:47.697; 64.074	5
Ally Wollaston; Bryony Botha; Emily Shearman; Nicole Shields	Women's team pursuit	4:04.679	1 Q	Italy; W 4:04.818–4:07.491; 58.819	1 FA	United States; L 4:04.927–4:04.306; 58.793	2nd place, silver medalist(s)

Qualification legend: Q – Qualify to semifinal for gold medal; q – Qualify to classification semifinal; FA – Gold medal final; FB – Bronze medal final; FC – Fifth place final; FD – Seventh place final

Keirin

Athlete	Event	Round 1	Repechage	Quarterfinals	Semifinals	Final
Athlete	Event	Rank	Rank	Rank	Rank	Rank
Sam Dakin	Men's keirin	5 R	2 Q	2 SF	5 FD	8
Ellesse Andrews	Women's keirin	1 Q	Bye	2 SF	1 FA	1st place, gold medalist(s)
Rebecca Petch	Women's keirin	5 R	2 Q	3 SF	5 FB	12

Omnium

Athlete	Event	Scratch race		Tempo race		Elimination race		Points race		Total	
Athlete	Event	Rank	Points	Rank	Points	Rank	Points	Rank	Points	Rank	Points
Aaron Gate	Men's omnium	9	24	8	26	11	20	4	53	5	123
Ally Wollaston	Women's omnium	5	32	9	24	12	18	2	51	3rd place, bronze medalist(s)	125

Madison

Athlete	Event	Points	Lap Points	Rank
Aaron Gate; Campbell Stewart	Men's madison	33	0	4
Bryony Botha; Emily Shearman	Women's madison	7	0	8

=== Mountain biking ===
New Zealand mountain bikers secured a men's and women's quota place each in the Olympic cross-country race by virtue of their top two results at the 2023 UCI Mountain Bike World Championships in Glasgow, Great Britain; and through the release of the final Olympic mountain biking rankings. Sam Gaze was selected for the men's quota. Sammie Maxwell took a case with the Sports Tribunal of New Zealand against Cycling New Zealand about her non-selection and won her case on 15 July 2024, with the tribunal securing her selection.

Athlete	Event	Time	Rank
Sam Gaze	Men's cross-country	1:28:03	6
Sammie Maxwell	Women's cross-country	1:30:43	8

=== BMX ===
Race
New Zealand qualified a men's quota in BMX racing through the allocations of final Olympic BMX ranking and a women's quota via the 2024 UCI BMX World Championships.

Athlete	Event	Quarterfinal		LCQ		Semifinal		Final	
Athlete	Event	Points	Rank	Time	Rank	Points	Rank	Result	Rank
Rico Bearman	Men's	16	14 q	32.736	1 Q	18	11	Did not advance	
Leila Walker	Women's	17	17 q	38.362	6	Did not advance			

Key: Q – Qualify to next round; q – Qualify to last chance qualifier

== Diving ==
New Zealand entered one diver, Elizabeth Roussel, into the Olympic competition.

Athlete	Event	Preliminary		Semifinal		Final	
Athlete	Event	Points	Rank	Points	Rank	Points	Rank
Elizabeth Roussel	Women's 3 m springboard	233.70	26	Did not advance			

== Equestrian ==
New Zealand entered a full squad of equestrian riders to the team eventing competition through a top-seven finish at the 2022 FEI Eventing World Championships in Pratoni del Vivaro, Italy. New Zealand also entered two riders, each in the dressage and jumping individual events, through the establishments of final olympics ranking for Group G (South East Asia, Oceania).

=== Dressage ===
Athlete	Horse	Event	Grand Prix		Grand Prix Freestyle		Overall	
Athlete	Horse	Event	Score	Rank	Technical	Artistic	Score	Rank
Melissa Galloway	Windermere J'Obei W	Individual	68.913	40	Did not advance			

Qualification Legend: Q = Qualified for the final based on position in group; q = Qualified for the final based on overall position

=== Eventing ===
Athlete	Horse	Event	Dressage		Cross-country			Jumping					
Athlete	Horse	Event	Dressage		Cross-country			Qualifier			Final		
Athlete	Horse	Event	Penalties	Rank	Penalties	Total	Rank	Penalties	Total	Rank	Penalties	Total	Rank
Clarke Johnstone	Menlo Park	Individual	25.70	9	4.80	30.50	12	4.40	34.90	16 Q	4.80	39.70	18
Tim Price	Falco	Individual	26.50	12	2.00	28.50	9	0.00	28.50	8 Q	0.00	28.50	6
Jonelle Price	Hiarado	Individual	30.80	27	28.40	59.20	41	12.00	71.20	40	Did not advance		
Clarke Johnstone; Tim Price; Jonelle Price	See above	Team	83.00	4	35.20	118.20	6	16.40	134.60	8	—N/a		

== Field hockey ==
Summary

Key:

- FT – After full-time.
- P – Match decided by penalty-shootout.

Team	Event	Group stage						Quarterfinal	Semifinal	Final / BM	
Team	Event	Opposition Score	Opposition Score	Opposition Score	Opposition Score	Opposition Score	Rank	Opposition Score	Opposition Score	Opposition Score	Rank
New Zealand men's	Men's tournament	India; L 2–3	Belgium; L 1–2	Argentina; L 0–2	Australia; L 0–5	Ireland; L 1–2	6	Did not advance			12

=== Men's tournament ===
The New Zealand men's national field hockey team qualified for the Olympics after finishing third at the 2024 FIH Olympic Qualifiers in Muscat, Oman.

Team roster

New Zealand announced their final squad on 18 June 2024.

Head coach: (South Africa) Greg Nicol

No.	Pos.	Player	Date of birth (age)	Caps	Goals	Club
1	GK	Dominic Dixon	7 August 1996 (aged 27)	35	0	(England) Oxted
2	FW	Scott Boyde	5 August 1994 (aged 29)	29	7	(Australia) Eastern Suburbs
4	DF	Dane Lett	29 August 1990 (aged 33)	128	5	(New Zealand) Wellington
6	FW	Simon Child	16 April 1988 (aged 36)	306	146	(New Zealand) Auckland
8	DF	Charlie Morrison	20 July 2003 (aged 21)	23	0	(New Zealand) Marist
11	FW	Jacob Smith	3 April 1991 (aged 33)	126	34	(New Zealand) AISC
12	FW	Samuel Lane	30 April 1997 (aged 27)	110	39	(Netherlands) Oranje-Rood
13	DF	Simon Yorston	7 March 2000 (aged 24)	25	0	(New Zealand) Hornby
17	MF	Nicholas Woods (captain)	26 August 1995 (aged 28)	173	24	(Germany) Hamburg
18		Bradley Read	4 February 1995 (aged 29)	62	0	(New Zealand)
19	MF	Joseph Morrison	4 October 2001 (aged 22)	31	1	(New Zealand) Marist
21	DF	Kane Russell	22 April 1992 (aged 32)	210	89	(Germany) Hamburg
22	DF	Blair Tarrant	11 May 1990 (aged 34)	266	6	(New Zealand) Howick
24	MF	Sean Findlay	5 December 2001 (aged 22)	47	5	(Netherlands) Oranje-Rood
29	FW	Hugo Inglis	18 January 1991 (aged 33)	260	75	(Germany) Hamburg
31	MF	Hayden Phillips	6 February 1998 (aged 26)	133	12	(England) Holcombe
34	DF	Malachi Buschl	15 October 1999 (aged 24)	34		(Germany) Hamburg
37	MF	Isaac Houlbrooke	6 September 2001 (aged 22)	28	5	(New Zealand) ABC

Reserves:

- Leon Hayward (GK)

Group play

Pos	Team	Pld	W	D	L	GF	GA	GD	Pts	Qualification
1	Belgium	5	4	1	0	15	7	+8	13	Advance to quarter-finals
2	India	5	3	1	1	10	7	+3	10	Advance to quarter-finals
3	Australia	5	3	0	2	12	10	+2	9	Advance to quarter-finals
4	Argentina	5	2	2	1	8	6	+2	8	Advance to quarter-finals
5	Ireland	5	1	0	4	4	9	−5	3	
6	New Zealand	5	0	0	5	4	14	−10	0	

Source: FIH
Rules for classification: 1) points; 2) matches won; 3) goal difference; 4) goals for; 5) head-to-head result; 6) field goals scored.

27 July 2024
17:30
v

India	3–2	New Zealand
Mandeep 24'; Vivek 34'; Harmanpreet 59'	Report	Lane 8'; Child 53'

Pitch 2
Umpires:
Marcin Grochal (POL)
Martin Madden (GBR)

28 July 2024
17:30
v

Belgium	2–1	New Zealand
Hendrickx 8'; Van Aubel 44'	Report	Lane 43'

Pitch 2
Umpires:
Steve Rogers (AUS)
Dan Barstow (GBR)

30 July 2024
17:00
v

Argentina	2–0	New Zealand
Domene 24'; Martínez 60'	Report

Pitch 1
Umpires:
Jonas van 't Hek (NED)
Sean Rapaport (RSA)

1 August 2024
10:30
v

New Zealand	0–5	Australia
	Report	Wickham 22'; Govers 25', 52', 57'; Willott 42'

Pitch 2
Umpires:
Lim Hong Zhen (SGP)
Gabriel Labate (ARG)

2 August 2024
17:00
v

New Zealand	1–2	Ireland
Morrison 5'	Report	Walker 13'; Duncan 31'

Pitch 1
Umpires:
Ben Göntgen (GER)
Zeke Newman (AUS)

== Football ==
Summary

Key:

- A.E.T – After extra time.
- P – Match decided by penalty-shootout.

Team	Event	Group Stage				Quarterfinal	Semifinal	Final / BM	
Team	Event	Opposition Score	Opposition Score	Opposition Score	Rank	Opposition Score	Opposition Score	Opposition Score	Rank
New Zealand men's	Men's tournament	Guinea; W 2–1	United States; L 1–4	France; L 0–3	3	Did not advance			11
New Zealand women's	Women's tournament	Canada; L 1–2	Colombia; L 0–2	France; L 1–2	4	Did not advance			10

=== Men's tournament ===
The New Zealand men's football team qualified for the Olympics by winning the 2023 OFC Men's Olympic Qualifying Tournament in Auckland.

Team roster

New Zealand announced their final squad on 9 July 2024. Lachlan Bayliss replaced the injured Riley Bidois on 23 July, while Luis Toomey was called-up as an alternate player.

Head coach: (England) Darren Bazeley

No.	Pos.	Player	Date of birth (age)	Caps	Goals	Club
1	GK	Alex Paulsen	4 July 2002 (aged 22)	4	0	(New Zealand Football) Wellington Phoenix
2	DF	Michael Boxall*	18 August 1988 (aged 35)	12	1	(United States Soccer Federation) Minnesota United
3	DF	Sam Sutton	10 December 2001 (aged 22)	4	1	(New Zealand Football) Wellington Phoenix
4	DF	Tyler Bindon	27 January 2005 (aged 19)	0	0	(The Football Association) Reading
5	DF	Finn Surman	23 September 2003 (aged 20)	4	0	(New Zealand Football) Wellington Phoenix
6	MF	Joe Bell*	27 April 1999 (aged 25)	6	0	(Norwegian Football Federation) Viking
7	MF	Matthew Garbett (captain)	13 April 2002 (aged 22)	2	0	(Royal Dutch Football Association) NAC Breda
8	MF	Ben Old	13 August 2002 (aged 21)	2	1	(New Zealand Football) Wellington Phoenix
9	FW	Ben Waine	11 June 2001 (aged 23)	10	8	(The Football Association) Plymouth Argyle
10	MF	Sarpreet Singh*	20 February 1999 (aged 25)	0	0	(German Football Association) Hansa Rostock
11	FW	Jesse Randall	19 August 2002 (aged 21)	5	4	(New Zealand Football) Wellington Olympic
12	GK	Kees Sims	27 March 2003 (aged 21)	1	0	(Swedish Football Association) GAIS
13	DF	Lukas Kelly-Heald	18 March 2005 (aged 19)	3	0	(New Zealand Football) Wellington Phoenix
14	FW	Jay Herdman	14 August 2004 (aged 19)	2	1	(Canadian Soccer Association) Vancouver Whitecaps
15	DF	Matthew Sheridan	9 May 2004 (aged 20)	2	0	(New Zealand Football) Wellington Phoenix
16	MF	Fin Conchie	10 August 2003 (aged 20)	2	0	(New Zealand Football) Wellington Phoenix
17	MF	Lachlan Bayliss	24 July 2002 (aged 22)	0	0	(Football Australia) Newcastle Jets
18	FW	Oskar van Hattum	14 April 2002 (aged 22)	5	2	(New Zealand Football) Wellington Phoenix
19	FW	Liam Gillion	17 October 2002 (aged 21)	2	1	(New Zealand Football) Auckland City
20	DF	Isaac Hughes	25 March 2004 (aged 20)	2	0	(New Zealand Football) Wellington Phoenix

* Overage player.

Group play

Pos	Team	Pld	W	D	L	GF	GA	GD	Pts	Qualification
1	France (H)	3	3	0	0	7	0	+7	9	Advance to knockout stage
2	United States	3	2	0	1	7	4	+3	6	Advance to knockout stage
3	New Zealand	3	1	0	2	3	8	−5	3	
4	Guinea	3	0	0	3	1	6	−5	0	

Source: FIFA
Rules for classification: Group stage tiebreakers
(H) Hosts
24 July 2024
17:00

Guinea	1–2	New Zealand
Diawara 72'	Report	Garbett 25'; Waine 76'

Stade de Nice, Nice
Attendance: 4,909
Referee: Adel Al-Naqbi (United Arab Emirates)

27 July 2024
19:00

New Zealand	1–4	United States
Randall 78'	Report	Mihailovic 8' (pen.); Zimmerman 12'; Busio 30'; Aaronson 58'

Stade de Marseille, Marseille
Attendance: 9,468
Referee: Glenn Nyberg (Sweden)

30 July 2024
19:00

New Zealand	0–3	France
	Report	Mateta 19'; Doué 71'; Kalimuendo 74'

Stade de Marseille, Marseille
Attendance: 45,790
Referee: Katia García (Mexico)

=== Women's tournament ===
The New Zealand women's football team qualified for the Olympics by winning the 2024 OFC Women's Olympic Qualifying Tournament in Apia, Samoa.

Team roster On 28 June 2024, Jitka Klimková opted to stand down from her role as head coach for the Olympics. In her absence, assistant coach Michael Mayne was appointed as acting head coach. New Zealand named a squad of 18 players and 4 alternates for the tournament on 4 July. On 24 July, Ali Riley withdrew from the squad due to injury and was replaced by Michaela Foster. Grace Neville was added to the alternate list.

Acting head coach: Michael Mayne

No.	Pos.	Player	Date of birth (age)	Caps	Goals	Club
1	GK	Anna Leat	26 June 2001 (aged 23)	19	0	(The Football Association) Aston Villa
2	DF	Kate Taylor	21 October 2003 (aged 20)	17	1	(New Zealand Football) Wellington Phoenix
3	DF	Mackenzie Barry	11 April 2001 (aged 23)	17	0	(New Zealand Football) Wellington Phoenix
4	DF	CJ Bott	22 April 1995 (aged 29)	47	3	(The Football Association) Leicester City
5	DF	Meikayla Moore	4 June 1996 (aged 28)	66	4	(Scottish Football Association) Glasgow City
6	MF	Malia Steinmetz	18 January 1999 (aged 25)	32	0	(Danish Football Association) Nordsjælland
7	DF	Michaela Foster	9 January 1999 (aged 25)	19	1	(New Zealand Football) Wellington Phoenix
8	MF	Macey Fraser	11 July 2002 (aged 22)	5	2	(United States Soccer Federation) Utah Royals
9	FW	Gabi Rennie	7 July 2001 (aged 23)	38	2	(Football Association of Finland) Åland United
10	FW	Indiah-Paige Riley	20 December 2001 (aged 22)	24	6	(Royal Dutch Football Association) PSV
11	MF	Katie Kitching	6 September 1998 (aged 25)	11	5	(The Football Association) Sunderland
12	GK	Victoria Esson	6 March 1991 (aged 33)	24	0	(Scottish Football Association) Rangers
13	DF	Rebekah Stott	17 June 1993 (aged 31)	103	4	(Football Australia) Melbourne City
14	MF	Katie Bowen	15 April 1994 (aged 30)	110	4	(Italian Football Federation) Inter Milan
15	FW	Ally Green	17 August 1998 (aged 25)	15	2	(Danish Football Association) AGF
16	FW	Jacqui Hand	19 February 1999 (aged 25)	28	8	(The Football Association) Lewes
17	FW	Milly Clegg	1 November 2005 (aged 18)	9	1	(United States Soccer Federation) Racing Louisville
18	MF	Grace Jale	10 April 1999 (aged 25)	31	9	(Football Australia) Perth Glory
20	MF	Annalie Longo	1 July 1991 (aged 33)	134	15	(New Zealand Football) Wellington Phoenix

Group play

Pos	Team	Pld	W	D	L	GF	GA	GD	Pts	Qualification
1	France (H)	3	2	0	1	6	5	+1	6	Advance to knockout stage
2	Canada	3	3	0	0	5	2	+3	3 (Note: On 27 July 2024, Canada was penalized 6 points by FIFA for their coaching staff's involvement in illegal drone spying at an official training venue. The decision was upheld by CAS on 31 July.)	Advance to knockout stage
3	Colombia	3	1	0	2	4	4	0	3	Advance to knockout stage
4	New Zealand	3	0	0	3	2	6	−4	0	

Source: FIFA
(H) Hosts
Notes:
25 July 2024
17:00

Canada	2–1	New Zealand
Lacasse 45+4'; Viens 79'	Report	Barry 13'

Stade Geoffroy-Guichard, Saint-Étienne
Attendance: 2,674
Referee: Tess Olofsson (Sweden)

28 July 2024
17:00

New Zealand	0–2	Colombia
	Report	Restrepo 27'; Santos 72'

Stade de Lyon, Décines-Charpieu
Attendance: 5,212
Referee: Kim Yu-jeong (South Korea)

31 July 2024
21:00

New Zealand	1–2	France
Taylor 43'	Report	Katoto 22', 49'

Stade de Lyon, Décines-Charpieu
Attendance: 21,946
Referee: Edina Alves Batista (Brazil)

== Golf ==
New Zealand entered three golfers into the Olympic tournament. They qualified directly for the games in the men's and women's individual competitions, based on their respective world ranking performances, on the IGF World Rankings.

Athlete	Event	Round 1	Round 2	Round 3	Round 4	Total		
Athlete	Event	Score	Score	Score	Score	Score	Par	Rank
Ryan Fox	Men's	67	73	68	74	282	−2	T35
Daniel Hillier	Men's	75	73	70	73	291	+7	55
Lydia Ko	Women's	72	67	68	71	278	−10	1st place, gold medalist(s)

== Gymnastics ==
=== Artistic ===
New Zealand entered one artistic gymnast into the games. Georgia-Rose Brown directly secured a quota spot by being one of two highest-ranked eligible athlete in the women's uneven bars, through the final accumulations of the 2024 Apparatus World Cup Series rankings. Although Isabella Brett qualified for the games through the 2024 Oceanian Championships in Auckland, Gymnastics New Zealand declined to put forward Brett's nomination to the New Zealand Olympic Committee for the Olympic Games.

Athlete	Event	Qualification						Final					
Athlete	Event	Apparatus				Total	Rank	Apparatus				Total	Rank
Athlete	Event	V	UB	BB	F	Total	Rank	V	UB	BB	F	Total	Rank
Georgia-Rose Brown	Women's individual all-around	13.233	13.666	12.333	12.233	51.465	34	Did not advance					

=== Trampoline ===
New Zealand entered two gymnasts (one male and one female) into the 2024 Summer Olympics trampoline competition through the World Cup Series ranking.

Athlete	Event	Qualification				Final	
Athlete	Event	Routine 1	Routine 2	Best score	Rank	Score	Rank
Dylan Schmidt	Men's	59.510	60.810	60.810	4 Q	19.500	8
Maddie Davidson	Women's	54.740	53.910	54.740	7 Q	54.230	7

== Judo ==
New Zealand qualified two judokas, Moira de Villiers (women's half-heavyweight, 78 kg) and Sydnee Andrews (women's heavyweight, +78 kg), based on the IJF World Ranking List and Olympic point rankings.

Athlete	Event	Round of 32	Round of 16	Quarterfinals	Semifinals	Repechage	Final / BM	
Athlete	Event	Opposition Result	Opposition Result	Opposition Result	Opposition Result	Opposition Result	Opposition Result	Rank
Moira de Villiers	Women's −78 kg	Branser (GUI); L 00–10	Did not advance					
Sydnee Andrews	Women's +78 kg	Cerić (BIH); L 00–10	Did not advance					

== Rowing ==
New Zealand rowers qualified boats in each of the following classes through the 2023 World Rowing Championships in Belgrade, Serbia and 2024 Final Qualification Regatta in Lucerne, Switzerland.

Men

Athlete	Event	Heats		Repechage		Quarterfinals		Semifinals		Final	
Athlete	Event	Time	Rank	Time	Rank	Time	Rank	Time	Rank	Time	Rank
Tom Mackintosh	Single sculls	6:55.92	1 QF	Bye		6:48.01	1 SA/B	6:44.49	2 FA	6:49.62	5
Dan Williamson; Phillip Wilson	Pair	6:32.44	2 SA/B	Bye		—N/a		6:32.77	4 FB	6:24.55	7
Robbie Manson; Jordan Parry	Double sculls	6:16.41	2 SA/B	Bye		—N/a		6:14.30	3 FA	6:21.44	6
Matt Macdonald; Ollie Maclean; Tom Murray; Logan Ullrich	Four	6:03.08	1 FA	Bye		—N/a				5:49.88	2nd place, silver medalist(s)

Women

Athlete	Event	Heats		Repechage		Quarterfinals		Semifinals		Final	
Athlete	Event	Time	Rank	Time	Rank	Time	Rank	Time	Rank	Time	Rank
Emma Twigg	Single sculls	7:34.97	1 QF	Bye		7:26.89	1 SA/B	7:17.19	1 FA	7:19.17	2nd place, silver medalist(s)
Kate Haines; Alana Sherman	Pair	7:43.56	5 R	7:46.18	4	—N/a		Did not advance			
Brooke Francis; Lucy Spoors	Double sculls	6:51.68	1 SA/B	Bye		—N/a		6:49.49	1 FA	6:50.45	1st place, gold medalist(s)
Jackie Kiddle; Shannon Cox	Lightweight double sculls	7:02.25	1 SA/B	Bye		—N/a		7:02.86	2 FA	6:51.65	4
Jackie Gowler; Phoebe Spoors; Davina Waddy; Kerri Williams	Four	6:45.44	2 FA	Bye		—N/a				6:29.08	3rd place, bronze medalist(s)

Qualification Legend: FA=Final A (medal); FB=Final B (non-medal); FC=Final C (non-medal); FD=Final D (non-medal); FE=Final E (non-medal); FF=Final F (non-medal); SA/B=Semifinals A/B; SC/D=Semifinals C/D; SE/F=Semifinals E/F; QF=Quarterfinals; R=Repechage

== Rugby sevens ==
Summary

Team	Event	Pool round				Quarterfinal	Semifinal / Cl.	Final / BM / Cl.	
Team	Event	Opposition Result	Opposition Result	Opposition Result	Rank	Opposition Result	Opposition Result	Opposition Result	Rank
New Zealand men's	Men's tournament	Japan; W 40–12	South Africa; W 17–5	Ireland; W 14–12	1 Q	South Africa; L 7–14	Classification semi-final Argentina; W 17–12	Fifth place match Ireland; W 17–7	5
New Zealand women's	Women's tournament	China; W 43–5	Canada; W 33–7	Fiji; W 38–7	1 Q	China; W 55–5	United States; W 24–12	Canada; W 19–12	1st place, gold medalist(s)

=== Men's tournament ===
The New Zealand national rugby sevens team qualified for the Olympics by securing a top-four placement in the 2022–23 World Rugby Sevens Series, registering its fourth victory in the Singapore leg.

Team roster New Zealand's squad of 12 players was named on 20 June 2024. Additionally, Tim Mikkelson, Sione Molia and Joe Webber were named as traveling reserves.

Head coach: Junior Tomasi Cama

No.	Player	Date of birth (age)
1	Scott Curry	17 May 1988 (aged 36)
2	Brady Rush	24 April 1999 (aged 25)
3	Tone Ng Shiu	26 May 1994 (aged 30)
4	Akuila Rokolisoa	4 June 1995 (aged 29)
5	Dylan Collier (c)	27 April 1991 (aged 33)
6	Ngarohi McGarvey-Black	20 May 1996 (aged 28)
7	Fehi Fineanganofo	31 August 2002 (aged 21)
8	Andrew Knewstubb	14 September 1995 (aged 28)
9	Regan Ware	7 August 1994 (aged 29)
10	Tepaea Cook-Savage	8 February 2001 (aged 23)
11	Moses Leo	11 August 1997 (aged 26)
12	Leroy Carter	24 February 1999 (aged 25)
13	Joe Webber	27 August 1993 (aged 30)
14	Sione Molia	5 September 1993 (aged 30)

Group stage

Pos	Team	Pld	W	D	L	PF	PA	PD	Pts	Qualification
1	New Zealand	3	3	0	0	71	29	+42	9	Advance to Quarter-finals
2	Ireland	3	2	0	1	62	24	+38	7	Advance to Quarter-finals
3	South Africa	3	1	0	2	59	32	+27	5	Advance to Quarter-finals
4	Japan	3	0	0	3	22	129	−107	3	

Source: World Rugby
Rules for classification: 1) Points; 2) Head-to-head result; 3) Point difference; 4) Points scored.

24 July 2024
18:00

New Zealand	40–12	Japan
Try: Rokolisoa (2) 1' c, 8' c Fineanganofo (2) 4' m, 6' c McGarvey-Black (2) 8' c, 12' c Con: Rokolisoa (4/5) 1', 7', 8', 8'; Knewstubb (1/1) 12'	World Rugby	Try: Tsuoka 2' c Ishida 16' m Con: Taninaka (1/1) 2'

Stade de France, Paris
Attendance: 69,000
Referee: Tevita Rokovereni (Fiji)

24 July 2024
21:30

New Zealand	17–5	South Africa
Try: Leo (2) 2' m, 11' c McGarvey-Black 7' m Con: Rokolisoa (1/1) 12'	World Rugby	Try: S. Davids 4' m

Stade de France, Paris
Attendance: 69,000
Referee: Reuben Keane (Australia)

25 July 2024
16:30

New Zealand	14–12	Ireland
Try: Carter 8' c McGarvey-Black 14' c Con: Rokolisoa (1/1) 8'; Knewstubb (1/1) 14'	World Rugby	Try: Ward 6' m Conroy 7' m Con: Roche (1/2) 8'

Stade de France, Paris
Attendance: 70,000
Referee: Jordan Way (Australia)

Quarter-final

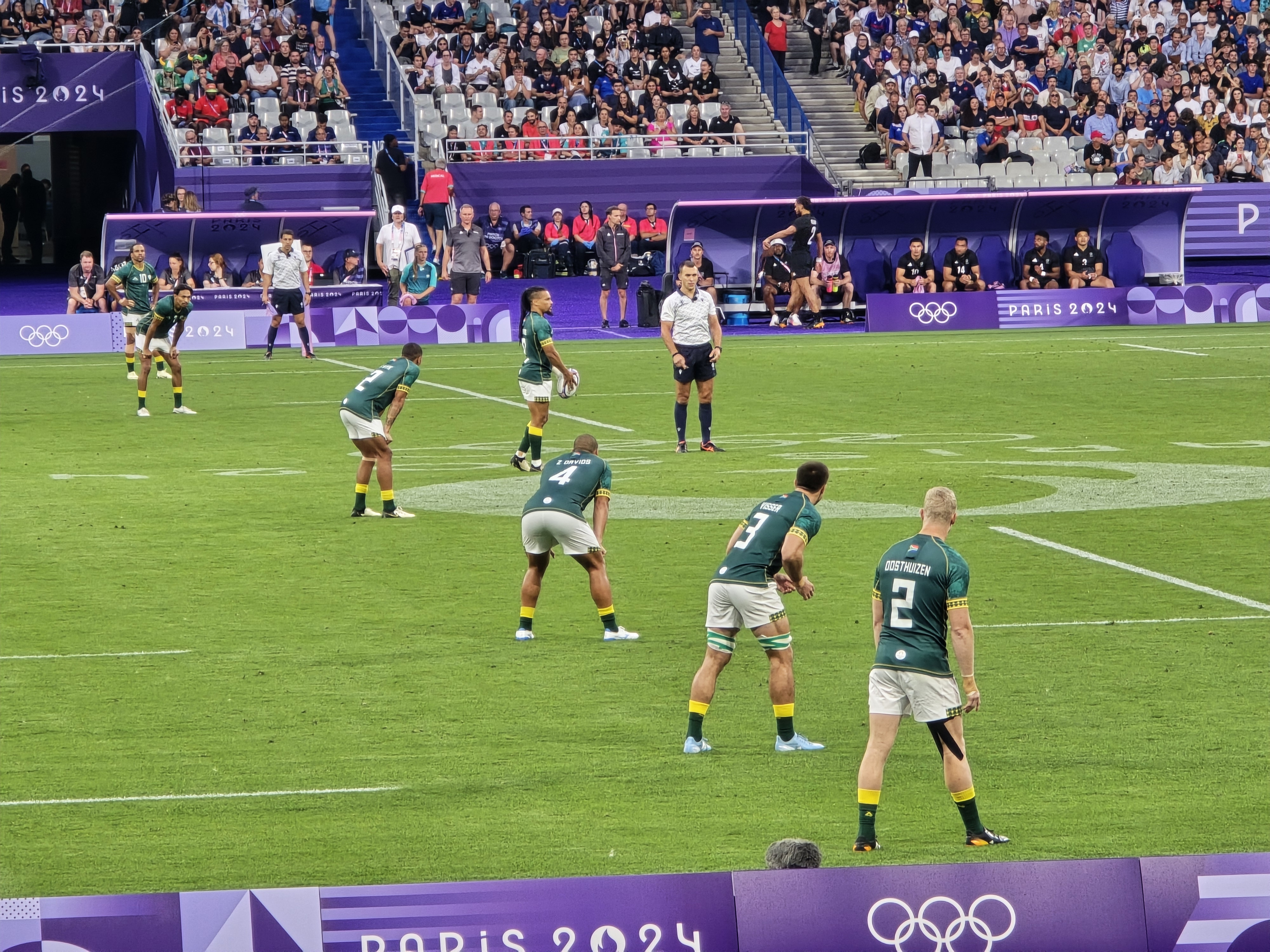
South Africa kick off against New Zealand

25 July 2024
21:00

New Zealand	7–14	South Africa
Try: Leo 10' c Con: Knewstubb (1/1) 10'	World Rugby	Try: S. Davids 3' c Leyds 7' c Con: Leyds (2/2) 4', 7'

Stade de France, Paris
Attendance: 70,000
Referee: Adam Leal (England/Great Britain)

5–8th place classification semi-final

27 July 2024
14:30

New Zealand	17–12	Argentina
Try: Rokolisoa 1' c Leo 14' m Knewstubb 19'; Con: Rokolisoa (1/1) 3'	World Rugby	Try: Wade 6' c González 11' m Con: Wade (1/2) 7'

Stade de France, Paris
Referee: Ben Breakspear (Wales/Great Britain)

Fifth place match

27 July 2024
18:30

New Zealand	17–7	Ireland
Try: Leo (2) 3' m, 12' c Rush 8' m Con: Knewstubb (1/1) 12'	World Rugby	Try: Mullins 9' c Con: Roche (1/1) 9'

Stade de France, Paris
Referee: Gianluca Gnecchi (Italy)

=== Women's tournament ===
The New Zealand women's national rugby sevens team qualified for the Olympics by securing a top-four placement in the 2022–23 World Rugby Women's Sevens Series, registering its fourth consecutive victory in the Vancouver leg.

Team roster New Zealand's squad of 12 players was named on 20 June 2024. Additionally, Tysha Ikenasio, Tenika Willison and Kelsey Teneti were named as traveling reserves.

Head coach: Cory Sweeney

- Michaela Blyde
- Jazmin Felix-Hotham
- Sarah Hirini (c)
- Tyla King
- Jorja Miller
- Manaia Nuku
- Mahina Paul
- Risaleeana Pouri-Lane
- Alena Saili
- Theresa Setefano
- Stacey Waaka
- Portia Woodman-Wickliffe

Group stage

Pos	Team	Pld	W	D	L	PF	PA	PD	Pts	Qualification
1	New Zealand	3	3	0	0	114	19	+95	9	Quarter-finals
2	Canada	3	2	0	1	50	64	−14	7	Quarter-finals
3	China	3	1	0	2	62	81	−19	5	Quarter-finals
4	Fiji	3	0	0	3	33	95	−62	3	

Source: World Rugby
Rules for classification: 1) Points; 2) Head-to-head result; 3) Point difference; 4) Points scored.

28 July 2024
18:00

New Zealand	43–5	China
Try: Blyde (4) 2' m, 4' c, 6' m, 8' c Waaka (2) 7' m, 12' c Hirini 15' c Con: Pouri-Lane (2/5) 4', 9'; King (2/2) 13', 15'	World Rugby	Try: Liu 11' m

Stade de France, Paris
Referee: Ano Kuwai (Japan)

28 July 2024
21:30

New Zealand	33–7	Canada
Try: Miller (2) 2' c, 7' c Pouri-Lane 5' c Felix-Hotham 10' c Woodman-Wickliffe 13' c Con: King (3/4) 3', 8', 10'; Nuku (1/1) 13'	World Rugby	Try: Williams 4' c Con: Hogan-Rochester (1/1) 4'

Stade de France, Paris
Referee: George Selwood (England/Great Britain)

29 July 2024
16:30

New Zealand	38–7	Fiji
Try: Miller 1' c Felix-Hotham 5' c Waaka (2) 7' c, 9' c Blyde 10' m Nuku 13' m Con: Pouri-Lane (4/4) 1', 5', 8', 10'	World Rugby	Try: Buleki 14' c Con: Ulunisau (1/1) 15'

Stade de France, Paris
Referee: Kat Roche (United States)

Quarterfinal

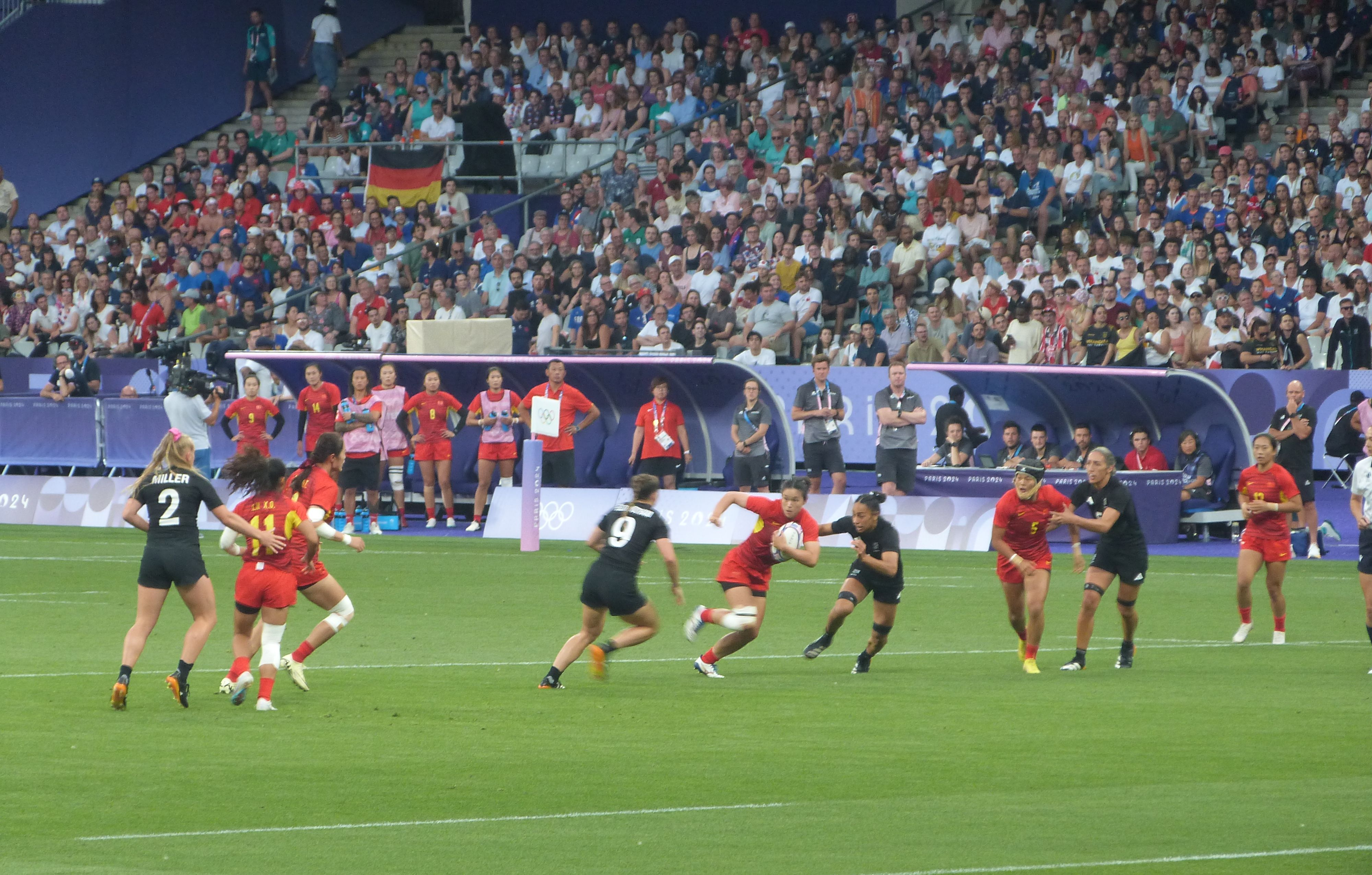
China breaking the line against New Zealand

29 July 2024
21:00

New Zealand	55–5	China
Try: Hirini (2) 1' c, 14' c Felix-Hotham (2) 6' c, 11' m Blyde (2) 7' m, 8' c Woodman-Wickliffe 8' m Paul (2) 12' c, 15' m Con: Pouri-Lane (2/4) 1', 6'; King (3/5) 9', 13', 14'	World Rugby	Try: Dou 4' m

Stade de France, Paris
Referee: Tyler Miller (Australia)

Semifinal

30 July 2024
15:30

New Zealand	24–12	United States
Try: Waaka (2) 5' c, 8' m Blyde (2) 11' c, 13' m Con: Pouri-Lane (1/1) 6'; King (1/3) 11'	World Rugby	Try: Kelter (2) 3' m Kirshe 15' c Con: Olsen (1/1) 16'

Stade de France, Paris
Referee: Craig Chan (Hong Kong)

Gold medal match

30 July 2024
19:45

New Zealand	19–12	Canada
Try: Pouri-Lane 1' c Blyde 7' c Waaka 12' m Con: Pouri-Lane (1/1) 1' c Nathan-Wong (1/2) 7'	World Rugby	Try: Daniels 6' c Corrigan 7' m Con: Daniels (1/2) 6'

Stade de France, Paris
Referee: Kat Roche (United States)

== Sailing ==
New Zealand sailors qualified one boat in each of the following classes through the 2023 Sailing World Championships in The Hague, Netherlands, and 2023 Sail Sydney in Sydney, Australia.

Elimination events

Athlete	Event	Opening series																						Quarterfinal	Semifinal								Final							
Athlete	Event	1	2	3	4	5	6	7	8	9	10	11	12	13	14	15	16	17	18	19	20	Net points	Rank	Rank	1	2	3	4	5	6	Total	Rank	1	2	3	4	5	6	Total	Rank
Josh Armit	Men's IQFoil	4	~~18~~	1	14	8	~~UFD~~	11	2	6	4	2	3	11	Cancelled							66	3 SF	Bye	—N/a							3	Did not advance							
Lukas Walton-Keim	Men's Formula Kite	12	~~18~~	14	10	17	9	~~18~~	Cancelled									—				60	15	Did not advance																
Veerle ten Have	Women's IQFoil	~~DSQ~~	15	16	8	~~18~~	5	12	11	3	5	3	2	16	13	Cancelled						109	9 QF	7	Did not advance															
Justina Kitchen	Women's Formula Kite	9	11	~~DNF~~	16	18	DNS	Cancelled										—				74	17	Did not advance																

Qualification legend: QF – Qualify to quarterfinal; SF – Qualify to semifinal; F – Qualify to final

Medal race events

Athlete	Event	Race													Net points	Final rank
Athlete	Event	1	2	3	4	5	6	7	8	9	10	11	12	M*	Net points	Final rank
Tom Saunders	Men's ILCA 7	11	17	10	7	19	3	~~BFD~~	13	Cancelled		—N/a		10	90	7
Isaac McHardie; William McKenzie	Men's 49er	1	3	8	8	1	1	11	~~18~~	17	1	10	14	6	82	2nd place, silver medalist(s)
Greta Pilkington	Women's ILCA 6	21	34	~~41~~	15	33	18	17	21	40	Can	—N/a		EL	199	34
Jo Aleh; Molly Meech	Women's 49erFX	15	17	~~20~~	9	17	8	3	2	1	14	8	7	8	109	7
Micah Wilkinson; Erica Dawson	Mixed Nacra 17	5	3	7	2	2	3	2	4	9	~~17~~	3	7	16	63	3rd place, bronze medalist(s)

Key: M – Medal race; EL – Eliminated, did not advance into the medal race

== Shooting ==
New Zealand shooters achieved quota places for the following events based on their results at the 2022 and 2023 ISSF World Championships, 2022, 2023, and 2024 European Championships, 2023 European Games, and 2024 ISSF World Olympic Qualification Tournament.

Athlete	Event	Qualification		Final	
Athlete	Event	Points	Rank	Points	Rank
Owen Robinson	Men's trap	121	11	Did not advance	
Chloe Tipple	Women's skeet	108	28	Did not advance	

== Sport climbing ==
For the first time in history, New Zealand qualified two climbers for Paris. Julian David and Sarah Tetzlaff qualified directly for the women's and men's speed events, by winning the gold medal at the 2023 Oceania Olympic Qualifier in Melbourne, Australia.

Speed

Athlete	Event	Qualification		Round of 16	Quarterfinals	Semifinals	Final / BM	
Athlete	Event	Time	Rank	Opposition Time	Opposition Time	Opposition Time	Opposition Time	Rank
Julian David	Men's	5.24	9	Alipour (IRI); W 5.20–5.26	Watson (USA); L 5.65–5.03	Did not advance		8
Sarah Tetzlaff	Women's	8.39	12	Kałucka (POL); L 8.41–6.65	Did not advance			12

== Surfing ==
New Zealand surfers confirmed two shortboard quota places (one in each gender) for Tahiti. Tokyo 2020 Olympian Billy Stairmand and rookie Saffi Vette topped the list of eligible surfers from Oceania to secure the lone available berth in their respective shortboard races at the 2023 ISA World Surfing Games in Surf City, El Salvador.

Athlete	Event	Round 1		Round 2	Round 3	Quarterfinal	Semifinal	Final / BM	
Athlete	Event	Score	Rank	Opposition Result	Opposition Result	Opposition Result	Opposition Result	Opposition Result	Rank
Billy Stairmand	Men's shortboard	5.53	3 R2	Toledo (BRA); L 14.00–17.00	Did not advance				
Saffi Vette	Women's shortboard	7.50	2 R2	Hopkins (POR); L 1.27–4.67	Did not advance				

Qualification legend: R3 – Qualifies to elimination rounds; R2 – Qualifies to repechage round

== Swimming ==
Swimmers from New Zealand achieved the entry standards in the following events for Paris 2024 (a maximum of two swimmers under the Olympic Qualifying Time (OST) and potentially at the Olympic Consideration Time (OCT)):

Men

Athlete	Event	Heat		Semifinal		Final	
Athlete	Event	Time	Rank	Time	Rank	Time	Rank
Taiko Torepe-Ormsby	50 m freestyle	22.01	19	Did not advance			
Cameron Gray	100 m freestyle	49.24	31	Did not advance			
Kane Follows	100 m backstroke	55.01	33	Did not advance			
Kane Follows	200 m backstroke	1:58.63	21	Did not advance			
Lewis Clareburt	200 m butterfly	1:57.12	21	Did not advance			
Lewis Clareburt	200 m individual medley	1:58.84	11 Q	2:00.06	14	Did not advance	
Lewis Clareburt	400 m individual medley	4:11.52	6 Q	—N/a		4:10.44	6

Women

Athlete	Event	Heat		Semifinal		Final	
Athlete	Event	Time	Rank	Time	Rank	Time	Rank
Erika Fairweather	200 m freestyle	1:56.54	7 Q	1:56.31	7 Q	1:55.59	7
Erika Fairweather	400 m freestyle	4:02.55	3 Q	—N/a		4:01.12	4
Eve Thomas	400 m freestyle	4:11.86	17	—N/a		Did not advance	
Erika Fairweather	800 m freestyle	8:22.22	7 Q	—N/a		8:23.27	8
Eve Thomas	800 m freestyle	8:33.25	12	—N/a		Did not advance	
Eve Thomas	1500 m freestyle	16:13.74	12	—N/a		Did not advance	
Hazel Ouwehand	100 m butterfly	58.03	18	Did not advance			
Caitlin Deans; Erika Fairweather; Eve Thomas; Laticia-Leigh Transom	4 x 200 m freestyle relay	7:54.37	8 Q	—N/a		7:55.89	8

== Tennis ==
New Zealand entered a team in the women's doubles consisting of Erin Routliffe and Lulu Sun. Sun was also an alternate in the women's singles, losing in the first round.

Athlete	Event	Round of 64	Round of 32	Round of 16	Quarterfinals	Semifinals	Final / BM	
Athlete	Event	Opposition Score	Opposition Score	Opposition Score	Opposition Score	Opposition Score	Opposition Score	Rank
Lulu Sun	Women's singles	Kostyuk (UKR); L 4–6, 3–6	Did not advance					
Erin Routliffe; Lulu Sun	Women's doubles	—N/a	Errani / Paolini (ITA); L 2–6, 3–6	Did not advance				

== Triathlon ==
New Zealand confirmed four quota places (two per gender) in the triathlon events for Paris, following the release of final mixed relay Olympics qualification ranking.

Individual

Athlete	Event	Time						Rank
Athlete	Event	Swim (1.5 km)	Trans 1	Bike (40 km)	Trans 2	Run (10 km)	Total	Rank
Dylan McCullough	Men's	20:36	0:51	51:58	0:26	31:44	1:45:35	19
Hayden Wilde	Men's	21:13	0:50	51:20	0:27	29:49	1:43:39	2nd place, silver medalist(s)
Ainsley Thorpe	Women's	23:59	0:55	1:01:22	0:27	37:05	2:03:48	44
Nicole van der Kaay	Women's	24:13	0:57	1:00:29	0:30	35:24	2:01:33	31

Relay

Athlete	Event	Time						Rank
Athlete	Event	Swim (300 m)	Trans 1	Bike (7 km)	Trans 2	Run (2 km)	Total	Rank
Hayden Wilde	Mixed relay	4:28	1:03	9:35	0:26	5:13	20:34	—N/a
Nicole van der Kaay	Mixed relay	5:33	1:14	11:03	0:30	5:52	24:12	—N/a
Dylan McCullough	Mixed relay	4:31	1:04	9:38	0:25	5:10	20:48	—N/a
Ainsley Thorpe	Mixed relay	5:05	1:13	11:44	0:26	6:21	24:49	—N/a
Total	Mixed relay	—N/a					1:30:23	14

== Weightlifting ==
New Zealand entered one weightlifter into the Olympic competition. David Liti (men's +102 kg) secured one available continental allocation spot in his weight divisions based on the IWF Olympic Qualification Rankings.

Athlete	Event	Snatch		Clean & Jerk		Total	Rank
Athlete	Event	Result	Rank	Result	Rank	Total	Rank
David Liti	Men's +102 kg	184	7	231	8	415	8

== Wrestling ==
For the first time since 2016, New Zealand qualified one wrestler for Paris 2024. Tayla Ford qualified for the games following the triumph of advancing to the final round at 2024 African & Oceania Olympic Qualification Tournament in Alexandria, Egypt.

Key:

- VT (ranking points: 5–0 or 0–5) – Victory by fall.
- VB (ranking points: 5–0 or 0–5) – Victory by injury (VF for forfeit, VA for withdrawal or disqualification)
- PP (ranking points: 3–1 or 1–3) – Decision by points – the loser with technical points.
- PO (ranking points: 3–0 or 0–3) – Decision by points – the loser without technical points.
- ST (ranking points: 4–0 or 0–4) – Great superiority – the loser without technical points and a margin of victory of at least 8 (Greco-Roman) or 10 (freestyle) points.
- SP (ranking points: 4–1 or 1–4) – Technical superiority – the loser with technical points and a margin of victory of at least 8 (Greco-Roman) or 10 (freestyle) points.

Athlete	Event	Round of 16	Quarterfinal	Semifinal	Repechage	Final / BM	
Athlete	Event	Opposition Result	Opposition Result	Opposition Result	Opposition Result	Opposition Result	Rank
Tayla Ford	Women's −68 kg	Larroque (FRA); L 0–3^{PO}	Did not advance				

== See also ==
- New Zealand at the 2024 Winter Youth Olympics
