= Canoeing at the 2024 Summer Olympics – Women's K-1 500 metres =

Women's K-1 500 metres at the Games of the XXXIII Olympiad
- Venue: National Olympic Nautical Stadium of Île-de-France, Vaires-sur-Marne
- Dates: 7 August 2024 (heats and quarterfinals); 10 August 2024 (semifinals & finals)

Medalists
1st place, gold medalist(s)		Lisa Carrington	New Zealand
2nd place, silver medalist(s)		Tamara Csipes	Hungary
3rd place, bronze medalist(s)		Emma Jørgensen	Denmark

The women's K-1 500 metres sprint canoeing event at the 2024 Summer Olympics took place on 7 and 10 August 2024 at the National Olympic Nautical Stadium of Île-de-France in Vaires-sur-Marne.

== Background ==
This was the 20th appearance of the event after it was introduced at the 1948 Olympics.

== Competition format ==
Sprint canoeing uses a four-round format for events with at least 11 boats, with heats, quarterfinals, semifinals, and finals. The specifics of the progression format depend on the number of boats ultimately entered.

The course is a flatwater course 9 metres wide. The name of the event describes the particular format within sprint canoeing. The "K" format means a kayak, with the canoeist sitting, using a double-bladed paddle to paddle, and steering with a foot-operated rudder (as opposed to a canoe, with a kneeling canoeist, single-bladed paddle, and no rudder). The "1" is the number of canoeists in each boat. The "500 metres" is the distance of each race.

== Schedule ==
All times are Central European Summer Time (UTC+2)

The event was held over two days, with two rounds per day.

Date	Time	Round
7 August 2024	9:30; 13:30	Heats; Quarterfinals
10 August 2024	10:30; 12:40	Semifinals; Finals

== Results ==
=== Heats ===
The first two canoers from each heat advance to the semifinals. The remaining competitors compete in the quarterfinals.

==== Heat 1 ====
Rank	Lane	Canoer	Country	Time	Notes
1	5	Aimee Fisher	New Zealand	1:49.16	SF
2	6	Brenda Rojas	Argentina	1:52.68	SF
3	4	Yoana Georgieva	Bulgaria	1:55.76	QF
4	8	Ruth Vorsselman	Netherlands	1:56.88	QF
5	7	Enja Rößeling	Germany	1:56.88	QF
6	2	Hedda Øristland	Norway	1:58.05	QF
7	3	Samaa Ahmed	Egypt	2:18.52	QF

==== Heat 2 ====
Rank	Lane	Canoer	Country	Time	Notes
1	2	Alida Dóra Gazsó	Hungary	1:50.78	SF
2	5	Alyce Wood	Australia	1:51.39	SF
3	4	Melina Andersson	Sweden	1:51.84	QF
4	6	Yin Mengdie	China	1:52.29	QF
5	8	Lize Broekx	Belgium	1:52.32	QF
6	3	Estefanía Fernández	Spain	1:54.74	QF
7	7	Saman Soltani	Refugee Olympic Team	2:02.19	QF

==== Heat 3 ====
Rank	Lane	Canoer	Country	Time	Notes
1	2	Wang Nan	China	1:51.28	SF
2	4	Hermien Peters	Belgium	1:51.46	SF
3	8	Dominika Putto	Poland	1:52.49	QF
4	5	Anamaria Govorčinović	Croatia	1:55.51	QF
5	6	Manon Hostens	France	1:57.13	QF
6	3	Beatriz Briones	Mexico	1:58.10	QF
7	7	Raina Taitingfong	Guam	2:29.66	QF

==== Heat 4 ====
Rank	Lane	Canoer	Country	Time	Notes
1	2	Linnea Stensils	Sweden	1:50.16	SF
2	5	Milica Novaković	Serbia	1:50.37	SF
3	4	Anežka Paloudová	Czech Republic	1:51.90	QF
4	3	Mariya Povkh	Ukraine	1:54.13	QF
5	6	Ana Paula Vergutz	Brazil	1:54.98	QF
6	8	Karina Alanís	Mexico	1:56.30	QF
7	7	Samalulu Clifton	Samoa	2:01.12	QF

==== Heat 5 ====
Rank	Lane	Canoer	Country	Time	Notes
1	2	Lisa Carrington	New Zealand	1:48.51	SF
2	3	Selma Konjin	Netherlands	1:49.28	SF
3	5	Michelle Russell	Canada	1:51.00	QF
4	7	Begoña Lazkano	Spain	1:55.54	QF
5	4	Esti Olivier	South Africa	1:55.98	QF
6	6	Ekaterina Shubina	Uzbekistan	1:58.37	QF

==== Heat 6 ====
Rank	Lane	Canoer	Country	Time	Notes
1	4	Tamara Csipes	Hungary	1:50.21	SF
2	5	Emma Jørgensen	Denmark	1:50.93	SF
3	6	Teresa Portela	Portugal	1:51.03	QF
4	2	Riley Melanson	Canada	1:54.11	QF
5	3	Stephenie Chen	Singapore	1:58.52	QF
6	7	Tiffany Koch	South Africa	2:02.76	QF

=== Quarterfinals ===
Progression: 1st-5th to SF, rest out.

==== Quarterfinal 1 ====
Rank	Lane	Canoer	Country	Time	Notes
1	3	Lize Broekx	Belgium	1:49.78	SF
2	4	Michelle Russell	Canada	1:49.78	SF
3	5	Yoana Georgieva	Bulgaria	1:51.74	SF
4	6	Anamaria Govorčinović	Croatia	1:52.92	SF
5	7	Stephenie Chen	Singapore	1:53.88	SF
6	8	Ekaterina Shubina	Uzbekistan	1:54.63	
7	2	Hedda Øristland	Norway	1:56.24	
8	1	Samalulu Clifton	Samoa	1:59.64	

==== Quarterfinal 2 ====
Rank	Lane	Canoer	Country	Time	Notes
1	5	Melina Andersson	Sweden	1:49.21	SF
2	7	Estefanía Fernández	Spain	1:51.24	SF
3	6	Mariya Povkh	Ukraine	1:52.09	SF
4	4	Teresa Portela	Portugal	1:52.40	SF
5	3	Manon Hostens	France	1:52.82	SF
6	2	Tiffany Koch	South Africa	1:56.81	
7	8	Samaa Ahmed	Egypt	2:14.39	

==== Quarterfinal 3 ====
Rank	Lane	Canoer	Country	Time	Notes
1	4	Domniika Putto	Poland	1:49.268	SF
2	5	Ruth Vorsselman	Netherlands	1:52.35	SF
3	2	Beatriz Briones	Mexico	1:53.05	SF
4	3	Begoña Lazkano	Spain	1:53.83	SF
5	6	Ana Paula Vergutz	Brazil	1:56.09	SF
6	7	Saman Soltani	Refugee Olympic Team	2:01.43	

==== Quarterfinal 4 ====
Rank	Lane	Canoer	Country	Time	Notes
1	4	Anežka Paloudová	Czech Republic	1:49.43	SF
2	5	Yin Mengdie	China	1:49.74	SF
3	3	Riley Melanson	Canada	1:50.16	SF
4	6	Enja Rößeling	Germany	1:52.74	SF
5	7	Karina Alanís	Mexico	1:52.86	SF
6	2	Esti Olivier	South Africa	1:53.21	
7	1	Raina Taitingfong	Guam	2:27.03	

=== Semi Finals ===
Progression: 1st-2nd to Final A, 3rd-4th to Final B, 5th-6th to Final C, rest out.

==== Semifinal 1 ====
Rank	Lane	Canoer	Country	Time	Notes
1	5	Aimee Fisher	New Zealand	1:49.54	FA
2	4	Wang Nan	China	1:50.96	FA
3	3	Alyce Wood	Australia	1:51.99	FB
4	6	Lize Broekx	Belgium	1:52.84	FB
5	7	Beatriz Briones	Mexico	1:53.86	FC
6	8	Stephenie Chen	Singapore	1:55.15	FC
7	2	Estefanía Fernández	Spain	1:56.20	
8	1	Enja Rößeling	Germany	1:57.22	

==== Semifinal 2 ====
Rank	Lane	Canoer	Country	Time	Notes
1	5	Lisa Carrington	New Zealand	1:48.10	FA
2	3	Emma Jørgensen	Denmark	1:49.59	FA
3	4	Milica Novaković	Serbia	1:50.41	FB
4	6	Melina Andersson	Sweden	1:50.79	FB
5	8	Manon Hostens	France	1:51.36	FC
6	7	Riley Melanson	Canada	1:52.99	FC
7	1	Anamaria Govorčinović	Croatia	1:53.13	
8	2	Ruth Vorsselman	Netherlands	1:54.91	

==== Semifinal 3 ====
Rank	Lane	Canoer	Country	Time	Notes
1	5	Alida Dóra Gazsó	Hungary	1:49.76	FA
2	3	Hermien Peters	Belgium	1:49.87	FA
3	1	Teresa Portela	Portugal	1:50.28	FB
4	2	Yin Mengdie	China	1:50.52	FB
5	6	Domniika Putto	Poland	1:51.43	FC
6	4	Brenda Rojas	Argentina	1:53.35	FC
7	7	Yoana Georgieva	Bulgaria	1:54.02	
8	8	Ana Paula Vergutz	Brazil	1:54.19	

==== Semifinal 4 ====
Rank	Lane	Canoer	Country	Time	Notes
1	4	Tamara Csipes	Hungary	1:48.72	FA
2	2	Michelle Russell	Canada	1:50.28	FA
3	5	Linnea Stensils	Sweden	1:50.75	FB
4	6	Anežka Paloudová	Czech Republic	1:51.47	FB
5	3	Selma Konijn	Netherlands	1:52.50	FC
6	7	Mariya Povkh	Ukraine	1:52.51	FC
7	1	Begoña Lazkano	Spain	1:52.87	
8	8	Karina Alanís	Mexico	1:53.83	

=== Finals ===
==== Final A ====
Rank	Lane	Canoer	Country	Time	Notes
1st place, gold medalist(s)	6	Lisa Carrington	New Zealand	1:47.36	OB
2nd place, silver medalist(s)	3	Tamara Csipes	Hungary	1:48.44	
3rd place, bronze medalist(s)	7	Emma Jørgensen	Denmark	1:49.76	
4	5	Aimee Fisher	New Zealand	1:49.91	
5	2	Wang Nan	China	1:50.89	
6	4	Alida Dóra Gazsó	Hungary	1:51.19	
7	1	Hermien Peters	Belgium	1:52.26	
8	8	Michelle Russell	Canada	1:53.83	

==== Final B ====
Rank	Lane	Canoer	Country	Time	Notes
1	6	Milica Novaković	Serbia	1:51.55	
2	4	Teresa Portela	Portugal	1:52.38	
3	3	Linnea Stensils	Sweden	1:52.59	
4	7	Melina Andersson	Sweden	1:52.65	
5	1	Yin Mengdie	China	1:53.25	
6	2	Lize Broekx	Belgium	1:53.67	
7	8	Anežka Paloudová	Czech Republic	1:54.31	
8	5	Alyce Wood	Australia	1:55.04	

==== Final C ====
Rank	Lane	Canoer	Country	Time	Notes
1	3	Selma Konijn	Netherlands	1:50.56	
2	4	Dominika Putto	Poland	1:52.85	
3	6	Manon Hostens	France	1:53.10	
4	1	Brenda Rojas	Argentina	1:53.88	
5	5	Beatriz Briones	Mexico	1:54.53	
6	7	Riley Melanson	Canada	1:56.36	
7	2	Stephenie Chen	Singapore	1:56.55	
8	8	Mariya Povkh	Ukraine	2:00.94	
