= 2021 ICF Canoe Sprint World Championships – Women's K-1 1000 metres =

Women's K-1 1000 metres at the 2021 ICF Canoe Sprint World Championships
- Venue: Lake Bagsværd
- Location: Copenhagen, Denmark
- Dates: 16–18 September
- Competitors: 18 from 18 nations
- Winning time: 3:56.04

Medalists
gold medal	Alida Dóra Gazsó	Hungary
silver medal	Lizzie Broughton	Great Britain
bronze medal	Pernille Knudsen	Denmark

The women's K-1 1000 metres competition at the 2021 ICF Canoe Sprint World Championships in Copenhagen took place on Lake Bagsværd.

== Schedule ==
The schedule was as follows:

Date	Time	Round
Thursday 16 September 2021	11:02	Heats
Thursday 16 September 2021	18:33	Semifinal
Saturday 18 September 2021	11:42	Final

All times are Central European Summer Time (UTC+2)

== Results ==
=== Heats ===
The fastest three boats in each heat advanced directly to the final.
The next four fastest boats in each heat, plus the fastest remaining boat advanced to the semifinal.

==== Heat 1 ====
Rank	Kayaker	Country	Time	Notes
1	Kira Stepanova	RCF	4:13.33	QF
2	Inna Hryshchun	Ukraine	4:13.44	QF
3	Maria Virik	Norway	4:13.56	QF
4	Mariana Petrušová	Slovakia	4:13.97	QS
5	Laura Pedruelo	Spain	4:14.51	QS
6	Madeline Schmidt	Canada	4:20.90	QS
7	Agata Fantini	Italy	4:21.18	QS
8	Uladzislava Skryhanava	Belarus	4:22.53	
9	Anna Mus	Netherlands	4:37.28	

==== Heat 2 ====
Rank	Kayaker	Country	Time	Notes
1	Alida Dóra Gazsó	Hungary	4:09.19	QF
2	Lizzie Broughton	Great Britain	4:11.34	QF
3	Anežka Paloudová	Czech Republic	4:12.61	QF
4	Anamaria Govorčinović	Croatia	4:18.18	QS
5	Pernille Knudsen	Denmark	4:18.55	QS
6	Netta Malinen	Finland	4:18.99	QS
7	Adrianna Kąkol	Poland	4:19.29	QS
8	Kristina Bedeč	Serbia	4:19.62	qS
9	Rebecca Georgsdotter	Sweden	4:37.19	

=== Semifinal ===
The fastest three boats advanced to the final.

Rank	Kayaker	Country	Time	Notes
1	Pernille Knudsen	Denmark	4:12.23	QF
2	Adrianna Kąkol	Poland	4:13.21	QF
3	Agata Fantini	Italy	4:13.87	QF
4	Laura Pedruelo	Spain	4:14.28	
5	Anamaria Govorčinović	Croatia	4:15.47	
6	Mariana Petrušová	Slovakia	4:16.22	
7	Netta Malinen	Finland	4:16.54	
8	Kristina Bedeč	Serbia	4:18.76	
9	Madeline Schmidt	Canada	4:21.36	

=== Final ===
Competitors raced for positions 1 to 9, with medals going to the top three.

Rank	Kayaker	Country	Time
1st place, gold medalist(s)	Alida Dóra Gazsó	Hungary	3:56.04
2nd place, silver medalist(s)	Lizzie Broughton	Great Britain	3:59.29
3rd place, bronze medalist(s)	Pernille Knudsen	Denmark	4:00.32
4	Anežka Paloudová	Czech Republic	4:02.67
5	Maria Virik	Norway	4:03.57
6	Kira Stepanova	RCF	4:04.53
7	Inna Hryshchun	Ukraine	4:07.32
8	Adrianna Kąkol	Poland	4:07.54
9	Agata Fantini	Italy	4:08.74
