= 2019 ICF Canoe Sprint World Championships – Women's K-1 1000 metres =

Women's K-1 1000 metres at the 2019 ICF Canoe Sprint World Championships
- Venue: Olympic Centre of Szeged
- Location: Szeged, Hungary
- Dates: 22–24 August
- Competitors: 18 from 18 nations
- Winning time: 4:07.90

Medalists
gold medal	Tamara Csipes	Hungary
silver medal	Justyna Iskrzycka	Poland
bronze medal	Lizzie Broughton	Great Britain

The women's K-1 1000 metres competition at the 2019 ICF Canoe Sprint World Championships in Szeged took place at the Olympic Centre of Szeged.

== Schedule ==
The schedule was as follows:

Date	Time	Round
Thursday 22 August 2019	10:17	Heats
Friday 23 August 2019	17:53	Semifinal
Saturday 24 August 2019	12:25	Final

All times are Central European Summer Time (UTC+2)

== Results ==
=== Heats ===
The fastest three boats in each heat advanced directly to the final.
The next four fastest boats in each heat, plus the fastest remaining boat advanced to the semifinal.

==== Heat 1 ====
Rank	Kayaker	Country	Time	Notes
1	Justyna Iskrzycka	Poland	3:54.84	QF
2	Mariana Petrušová	Slovakia	3:55.61	QF
3	Svetlana Chernigovskaya	Russia	3:55.76	QF
4	Bolette Iversen	Denmark	4:00.53	QS
5	Maria Virik	Norway	4:00.67	QS
6	Anna Zagorska	Sweden	4:01.05	QS
7	Eva Barrios	Spain	4:03.37	QS
8	Irina Podoinikova	Kazakhstan	4:09.87	qS
9	Alina Urs	United States	4:23.34	

==== Heat 2 ====
Rank	Kayaker	Country	Time	Notes
1	Tamara Csipes	Hungary	3:54.30	QF
2	Lizzie Broughton	Great Britain	3:56.45	QF
3	Sarah Brüßler	Germany	3:57.28	QF
4	Alina Neumiarzhytskaya	Belarus	3:58.91	QS
5	Jitta van der Laan	Netherlands	4:01.46	QS
6	Jo Shin-young	South Korea	4:14.70	QS
7	Deborah Saw	Singapore	4:17.09	QS
8	Yan Siou-hua	Chinese Taipei	4:20.13	
9	Melanie Waite	Malta	4:41.10	

=== Semifinal ===
The fastest three boats advanced to the final.

Rank	Kayaker	Country	Time	Notes
1	Eva Barrios	Spain	3:56.47	QF
2	Alina Neumiarzhytskaya	Belarus	3:57.30	QF
3	Bolette Iversen	Denmark	3:58.83	QF
4	Maria Virik	Norway	3:59.15	
5	Anna Zagorska	Sweden	4:00.36	
6	Jo Shin-young	South Korea	4:06.58	
7	Irina Podoinikova	Kazakhstan	4:07.45	
8	Jitta van der Laan	Netherlands	4:12.99	
9	Deborah Saw	Singapore	4:16.53	

=== Final ===
Competitors raced for positions 1 to 9, with medals going to the top three.

Rank	Kayaker	Country	Time
1st place, gold medalist(s)	Tamara Csipes	Hungary	4:07.90
2nd place, silver medalist(s)	Justyna Iskrzycka	Poland	4:09.26
3rd place, bronze medalist(s)	Lizzie Broughton	Great Britain	4:10.44
4	Sarah Brüßler	Germany	4:10.58
5	Mariana Petrušová	Slovakia	4:12.44
6	Alina Neumiarzhytskaya	Belarus	4:15.33
7	Eva Barrios	Spain	4:18.54
8	Bolette Iversen	Denmark	4:19.32
9	Svetlana Chernigovskaya	Russia	4:31.56
