= Estefanía Fernández =

Spanish canoeist (born 1996)

Personal information
- Full name: Estefanía Fernández González
- Born: 25 June 1996 (age 30) Mérida, Badajoz, Spain

Sport
- Country: Spain
- Sport: Canoe sprint Canoe marathon
- Events: K–1 5000 m, K–4 500 m
Medal record
Representing Spain
Women's sprint kayak
World Championships
Gold medal – first place	2023 Duisburg	K-1 5000 m
Gold medal – first place	2025 Milan	K-4 500 m
Bronze medal – third place	2023 Duisburg	K-4 500 m
European Championships
Silver medal – second place	2025 Racice	K-4 500 m
Women's canoe marathon
World Championships
Silver medal – second place	2022 Ponte de Lima	K-1 short race

Estefanía Fernández González (Note: In this Spanish name, the first or paternal surname is Fernández and the second or maternal family name is González.) (born 25 June 1996) is a Spanish canoeist. She represented Spain at the 2024 Summer Olympics.

== Career ==
In September 2022, Fernández competed at the 2022 ICF Canoe Marathon World Championships and won a silver medal in the K-1 short race with a time of 14:24.79. She then competed at the 2023 ICF Canoe Sprint World Championships and won a gold medal in the K-1 5000 metres with a time of 22:45.357, and a bronze medal in the K-4 500 metres.

She represented Spain at the 2024 Summer Olympics in both the K-1 500 metres and K-4 500 metres events, and failed to medal.

In August 2025, she competed at the 2025 ICF Canoe Sprint World Championships and won a gold medal in the K-4 500 metres with a time of 1:18.93. This was Spain's first gold medal in the event.
