= Alicia Hoskin =

New Zealand canoeist (born 2000)

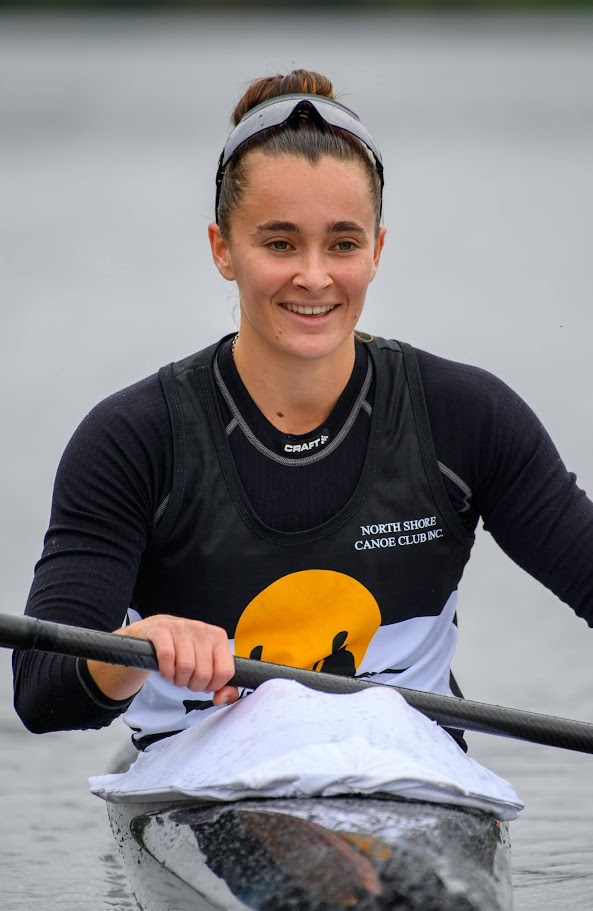
- Hoskin in 2023

Personal information
- Nationality: New Zealand
- Born: 6 February 2000 (age 26) Gisborne, New Zealand
- Height: 1.63 m (5 ft 4 in)

Sport
- Country: New Zealand
- Sport: Sprint kayak
- Club: North Shore Canoe Club
- Partner: Elliot Snedden
- Coached by: Gordon Walker
Medal record
Olympic Games
Gold medal – first place	2024 Paris	K-2 500 m
Gold medal – first place	2024 Paris	K-4 500 m
World Championships
Gold medal – first place	2023 Duisburg	K-4 500 m
World Cups
Gold medal – first place	2024 Szeged	K-2 500 m
Gold medal – first place	2024 Poznan	K-2 500 m
Silver medal – second place	2024 Poznan	K-4 500 m
Gold medal – first place	2023 Szeged	K-2 500 m
Bronze medal – third place	2023 Szeged	K-4 500 m
Gold medal – first place	2023 Paris	K-2 500 m
Silver medal – second place	2023 Paris	K-4 500 m
Silver medal – second place	2022 Poznan	K-4 500 m
Bronze medal – third place	2022 Racice	K-2 500 m

Alicia Hoskin (born 6 February 2000) is a New Zealand flatwater canoeist. At the 2024 Summer Olympics, she won two gold medals, in the K‑2 500 metres and the K‑4 500 metres events.

== Early life ==
Born and raised in Gisborne, she attended Gisborne Girls' High School where she was the Head Girl (2018). A member of the Poverty Bay Kayak Club there, she was coached by 1984 Olympic sprint canoeist Liz Thompson. She attended Massey University studying Sport Development.

== Canoeing ==
Hoskin was selected for the junior canoe sprint world championships in 2017 when, as a 17-year-old, she underwent what was initially thought to be a routine pre-departure health check. Unfortunately, cardiology tests revealed Wolff-Parkinson-White Syndrome, which is present at birth and can cause rapid heartbeats and even heart failure. Hoskin required a cardiac ablation, a procedure that scars tissue in the heart to block abnormal electrical signals. It involved feeding a catheter up one of the veins in her leg and through the wall of her heart to the other side.

Hoskin wanted to continue to compete internationally after the heart surgery and moved to Auckland to train with the Canoe Racing New Zealand high performance squad. Hoskin made her World Championship debut in Szeged in Hungary, finishing ninth with Caitlin Ryan at the 2019 ICF Canoe Sprint World Championships – Women's K-2 500 metres.

In June 2021 Hoskin was one of four women's paddlers selected to the New Zealand team to compete in Tokyo for the delayed 2020 Summer Games, placing 14th in the K2 500m, alongside Teneale Hatton and 4th in the K4 500m, alongside Hatton, Lisa Carrington, and Caitlin Regal.

At the 2023 Canoe Sprint World Championships in Duisburg, Hoskin won a gold medal in the K‑4 500 metres with Lisa Carrington, Olivia Brett and Tara Vaughan. This was a historic win for New Zealand and the sport of canoe sprint, being the first ever time the K4 500 world title had been won by a country outside of the traditional European powerhouses.

In April 2024 Hoskin was named in New Zealands largest ever canoe sprint team for the Paris Olympic winning gold in both the k4 500m ( with Lisa Carrington, Olivia Brett and Tara Vaughan), and K2 500m with Lisa Carrington.

The K4 win was the first by a non European country in Olympic history and the only country outside Germany and Hungary to follow a world championship win with an Olympic gold. In the K2 500, the kiwi pair repeated the gold performance in Tokyo of Carrington and Caitlin Ryan in a commanding win.

== Awards and honours ==
Hoskin was named Canoe Sprint Athlete of the Year at the Canoe Racing New Zealand 2020 Sport and Recognition Awards.
