= Ella Beere =

Australian canoeist (born 1998)

Personal information
- Nickname: Beery
- Born: 15 April 1998 (age 28) North Gosford, NSW, Australia
- Home town: Gold Coast, Queensland, Australia

Sport
- Country: Australia
- Sport: Sprint kayak
- Events: K-2 500 m, K-4 500 m
Medal record
Women's canoe sprint
Representing Australia
World Championships
Silver medal – second place	2022 Dartmouth	K-4 500 m

Ella Beere (born 15 April 1998) is an Australian canoeist. She represented Australia at the 2024 Summer Olympics.

== Early life ==
Beere attended Macquarie University in Sydney and earned an undergraduate degree in psychology.

== Career ==
Beere competed at the 2022 ICF Canoe Sprint World Championships in the K-4 500 metres event and won a silver medal.

She competed at the 2023 ICF Canoe Sprint World Championships in the K-4 500 metres event and finished in fifth place with a time of 1:32.636. As a result, they qualified for the 2024 Summer Olympics. At the Olympics she competed in the K-2 500 metres event with Alyssa Bull and advanced to the final, finishing in 7th place.
