= Canoeing at the 2024 Summer Olympics – Women's K-2 500 metres =

Women's K-2 500 metres at the Games of the XXXIII Olympiad
- Venue: National Olympic Nautical Stadium of Île-de-France, Vaires-sur-Marne
- Dates: 6 August 2024 (heats and quarterfinals); 9 August 2024 (semifinals & finals)

Medalists
1st place, gold medalist(s)		Lisa Carrington; Alicia Hoskin	New Zealand
2nd place, silver medalist(s)		Tamara Csipes; Alida Dóra Gazsó	Hungary
3rd place, bronze medalist(s)		Paulina Paszek; Jule Hake	Germany
3rd place, bronze medalist(s)		Noémi Pupp; Sára Fojt	Hungary

The women's K-2 500 metres sprint canoeing event at the 2024 Summer Olympics will take place on 6 and 9 August 2024 at the National Olympic Nautical Stadium of Île-de-France in Vaires-sur-Marne.

== Background ==
This will be the 17th appearance of the event after it was introduced at the 1960 Olympics.

== Competition format ==
Sprint canoeing uses a four-round format for events with at least 11 boats, with heats, quarterfinals, semifinals, and finals. The specifics of the progression format depend on the number of boats ultimately entered.

The course is a flatwater course 9 metres wide. The name of the event describes the particular format within sprint canoeing. The "K" format means a kayak, with the canoeist sitting, using a double-bladed paddle to paddle, and steering with a foot-operated rudder (as opposed to a canoe, with a kneeling canoeist, single-bladed paddle, and no rudder). The "2" is the number of canoeists in each boat. The "500 metres" is the distance of each race.

== Schedule ==
All times are Central European Summer Time (UTC+2)

The event will be held over two days, with two rounds per day.

Date	Time	Round
6 August 2024	12:10; 14:10	Heats; Quarterfinals
9 August 2024	10:50; 13:00	Semifinals; Finals

== Results ==
=== Heats ===
Progression System: 1st-2nd to SF, rest to QF.

==== Heat 1 ====
Rank	Lane	Canoer	Country	Time	Notes
1	7	Pauline Jagsch; Lena Röhlings	Germany	1:41.45	SF
2	4	Yu Shimeng; Chen Yule	China	1:42.70	SF
3	5	Emma Aastrand Jørgensen; Frederikke Hauge Matthiesen	Denmark	1:45.02	QF
4	6	Manon Hostens; Vanina Paoletti	France	1:45.34	QF
5	3	Maria Virik; Anna Margrete Sletsjoe	Norway	1:47.17	QF

==== Heat 2 ====
Rank	Lane	Canoer	Country	Time	Notes
1	5	Lisa Carrington; Alicia Hoskin	New Zealand	1:41.05	SF
2	4	Hermien Peters; Lize Broekx	Belgium	1:41.80	SF
3	7	Tamara Csipes; Alida Dóra Gazsó	Hungary	1:42.68	QF
4	6	Ella Beere; Alyssa Bull	Australia	1:46.21	QF
5	3	Tiffany Amber Koch; Esti Olivier	South Africa	1:52.14	QF

==== Heat 3 ====
Rank	Lane	Canoer	Country	Time	Notes
1	5	Martyna Klatt; Helena Wiśniewska	Poland	1:40.95	SF
2	4	Linnea Stensils; Moa Wikberg	Sweden	1:40.97	SF
3	3	Courtney Stott; Natalie Davison	Canada	1:44.35	QF
4	7	Aimee Fisher; Lucy Matehaere	New Zealand	1:46.52	QF
5	6	Carolina García; Sara Ouzande	Spain	1:49.01	QF

==== Heat 4 ====
Rank	Lane	Canoer	Country	Time	Notes
1	5	Paulina Paszek; Jule Hake	Germany	1:39.03	SF
2	7	Karolina Naja; Anna Puławska	Poland	1:39.18	SF
3	4	Noémi Pupp; Sára Fojt	Hungary	1:39.44	QF
4	6	Selma Konijn; Ruth Vorsselman	Netherlands	1:43.91	QF
5	3	Karina Alanís; Beatriz Briones	Mexico	1:44.87	QF

=== Quarterfinals ===
Progression System: 1st-4th to SF, rest eliminated.

==== Quarterfinal 1 ====
Rank	Lane	Canoer	Country	Time	Notes
1	3	Selma Konijn; Ruth Vorsselman	Netherlands	1:40.93	SF
2	6	Ella Beere; Alyssa Bull	Australia	1:41.89	SF
3	2	Carolina García; Sara Ouzande	Spain	1:42.03	SF
4	4	Courtney Stott; Natalie Davison	Canada	1:42.58	SF
5	5	Emma Aastrand Jørgensen; Frederikke Hauge Matthiesen	Denmark	1:42.61	X
6	7	Maria Virik; Anna Margrete Sletsjoe	Norway	1:43.28	X

==== Quarterfinal 2 ====
Rank	Lane	Canoer	Country	Time	Notes
1	5	Tamara Csipes; Alida Dóra Gazsó	Hungary	1:40.57	SF
2	6	Manon Hostens; Vanina Paoletti	France	1:41.43	SF
3	2	Karina Alanís; Beatriz Briones	Mexico	1:41.45	SF
4	4	Noémi Pupp; Sára Fojt	Hungary	1:41.90	SF
5	3	Aimee Fisher; Lucy Matehaere	New Zealand	1:44.45	X
6	7	Tiffany Amber Koch; Esti Olivier	South Africa	1:46.40	X

=== Semifinals ===
Progression System: 1st-4th to Final A, rest to Final B.

==== Semi final 1 ====
Rank	Lane	Canoer	Country	Time	Notes
1	4	Pauline Jagsch; Lena Röhlings	Germany	1:39.51	FA
2	3	Hermien Peters; Lize Broekx	Belgium	1:39.74	FA
3	2	Tamara Csipes; Alida Dóra Gazsó	Hungary	1:39.76	FA
4	7	Ella Beere; Alyssa Bull	Australia	1:40.26	FA
5	1	Karina Alanís; Beatriz Briones	Mexico	1:40.39	FB
6	5	Martyna Klatt; Helena Wiśniewska	Poland	1:40.73	FB
7	6	Karolina Naja; Anna Puławska	Poland	1:42.14	FB
8	8	Courtney Stott; Natalie Davison	Canada	1:42.57	FB

==== Semi final 2 ====
Rank	Lane	Canoer	Country	Time	Notes
1	4	Lisa Carrington; Alicia Hoskin	New Zealand	1:38.52	FA
2	5	Paulina Paszek; Jule Hake	Germany	1:38.84	FA
3	2	Selma Konijn; Ruth Vorsselman	Netherlands	1:39.49	FA
4	8	Noémi Pupp; Sára Fojt	Hungary	1:39.89	FA
5	6	Linnea Stensils; Moa Wikberg	Sweden	1:40.06	FB
6	1	Carolina García; Sara Ouzande	Spain	1:40.23	FB
7	7	Manon Hostens; Vanina Paoletti	France	1:40.62	FB
8	3	Yu Shimeng; Chen Yule	China	1:44.45	FB

=== Finals ===
==== Final A ====
Rank	Lane	Canoer	Country	Time	Notes
1st place, gold medalist(s)	4	Lisa Carrington; Alicia Hoskin	New Zealand	1:37.28	
2nd place, silver medalist(s)	7	Tamara Csipes; Alida Dóra Gazsó	Hungary	1:39.39	
3rd place, bronze medalist(s)	6	Paulina Paszek; Jule Hake	Germany	1:39.46	
3rd place, bronze medalist(s)	8	Noémi Pupp; Sára Fojt	Hungary	1:39.46	
5	3	Hermien Peters; Lize Broekx	Belgium	1:39.84	
6	5	Pauline Jagsch; Lena Röhlings	Germany	1:40.09	
7	1	Ella Beere; Alyssa Bull	Australia	1:40.94	
8	2	Selma Konijn; Ruth Vorsselman	Netherlands	1:41.26	

==== Final B ====
Rank	Lane	Canoer	Country	Time	Notes
9	4	Linnea Stensils; Moa Wikberg	Sweden	1:42.05	
10	5	Karina Alanís; Beatriz Briones	Mexico	1:43.70	
11	3	Martyna Klatt; Helena Wiśniewska	Poland	1:43.82	
12	7	Karolina Naja; Anna Puławska	Poland	1:44.50	
13	2	Manon Hostens; Vanina Paoletti	France	1:45.18	
14	8	Yu Shimeng; Chen Yule	China	1:46.26	
15	1	Courtney Stott; Natalie Davison	Canada	1:46.96	
	6	Carolina García; Sara Ouzande	Spain	DNF	
