= Tamara Csipes =

Hungarian sprint kayaker

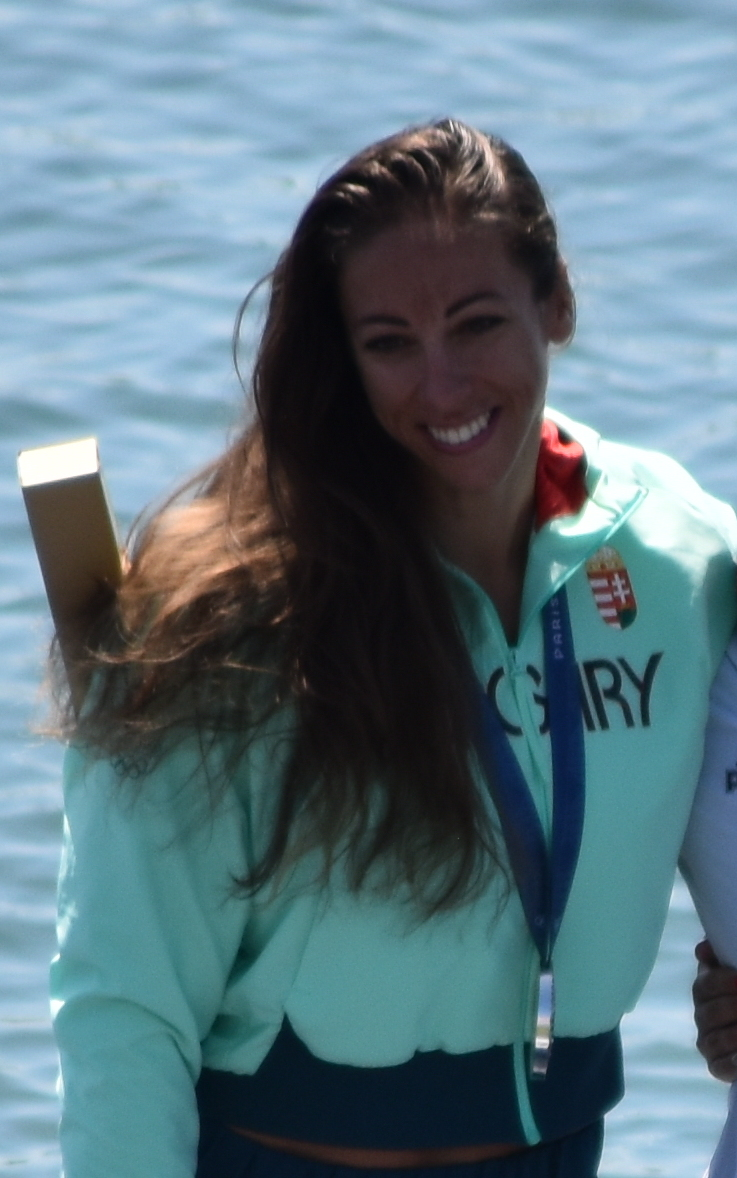
- Csipes at the 2024 Summer Olympics

Personal information
- Nationality: Hungarian
- Born: 24 August 1989 (age 36) Budapest, Hungary
- Height: 1.78 m (5 ft 10 in)
- Weight: 78 kg (172 lb)

Sport
- Country: Hungary
- Sport: Sprint kayak
- Club: Dominó-Honvéd
- Coached by: Ferenc Csipes
Medal record
Women's sprint kayak
Representing Hungary
Event	1st	2nd	3rd
Olympic Games	2	3	1
World Championships	9	4	0
European Games	1	0	1
European Championships	8	5	1
Total	20	12	3
Olympic Games
Gold medal – first place	2016 Rio de Janeiro	K-4 500 m
Gold medal – first place	2020 Tokyo	K-4 500 m
Silver medal – second place	2020 Tokyo	K-1 500 m
Silver medal – second place	2024 Paris	K-2 500 m
Silver medal – second place	2024 Paris	K-1 500 m
Bronze medal – third place	2024 Paris	K-4 500 m
World Championships
Gold medal – first place	2010 Poznań	K-2 1000 m
Gold medal – first place	2010 Poznań	K-4 500 m
Gold medal – first place	2011 Szeged	K-1 1000 m
Gold medal – first place	2011 Szeged	K-1 5000 m
Gold medal – first place	2014 Moscow	K-2 500 m
Gold medal – first place	2018 Montemor-o-Velho	K-2 1000 m
Gold medal – first place	2019 Szeged	K-1 1000 m
Gold medal – first place	2019 Szeged	K-4 500 m
Gold medal – first place	2021 Copenhagen	K-2 500 m
Silver medal – second place	2014 Moscow	K-1 1000 m
Silver medal – second place	2021 Copenhagen	K-1 500 m
Silver medal – second place	2021 Copenhagen	K-4 500 m
Bronze medal – third place	2023 Duisburg	K-1 500 m
European Games
Gold medal – first place	2019 Minsk	K-4 500 m
Bronze medal – third place	2023 Kraków-Małopolska	K-2 500 m
European Championships
Gold medal – first place	2010 Trasona	K-2 1000 m
Gold medal – first place	2011 Belgrade	K-2 500 m
Gold medal – first place	2011 Belgrade	K-2 1000 m
Gold medal – first place	2014 Brandenburg	K-1 1000 m
Gold medal – first place	2014 Brandenburg	K-2 500 m
Gold medal – first place	2016 Moscow	K-4 500 m
Gold medal – first place	2021 Poznań	K-2 1000 m
Gold medal – first place	2021 Poznań	K-4 500 m
Gold medal – first place	2024 Szeged	K-1 500 m
Gold medal – first place	2024 Szeged	K-4 500 m
Silver medal – second place	2009 Brandenburg	K-2 1000 m
Silver medal – second place	2009 Brandenburg	K-4 500 m
Silver medal – second place	2010 Trasona	K-1 5000 m
Silver medal – second place	2010 Trasona	K-4 500 m
Silver medal – second place	2018 Belgrade	K-2 500 m
Bronze medal – third place	2018 Belgrade	K-2 1000 m
Bronze medal – third place	2024 Szeged	K-2 500 m

Tamara Csipes (born 24 August 1989) is a Hungarian sprint canoeist who has competed since the late 2000s. At the 2020 Summer Olympics, she won a gold medal in Women's K-4 500 metres, and a silver medal in the Women's K-1 500 metres

== Career ==
At the 2010 ICF Canoe Sprint World Championships in Poznań, she won two gold medals earning them in the K-2 1000 m and K-4 500 m events. In 2015 Csipes was suspended for four months after she failed a drug test.

She competed at the 2018 ICF Canoe Sprint World Championships, and 2019 ICF Canoe Sprint World Championships.

== Awards ==
- Junior Príma award (2008)
- Excellent Athlete of Újbuda (2009)
- Hungarian Sportswoman of the Year – votes of sports journalists: 2011
- Perpetual champion of Hungarian Kayak-Canoe (2014)
- Order of Merit of Hungary – Officer's Cross (2016)
