= Marija Dostanić =

Serbian sprint canoer (born 1999)

Personal information
- Nationality: Serbia
- Born: July 29, 1999 (age 26) Sremska Mitrovica, FR Yugoslavia
- Height: 1.77 m (5 ft 10 in)
- Weight: 70 kg (154 lb)

Sport
- Sport: Canoe racing
- Club: "Val" Sremska Mitrovica
Medal record
Women's canoe sprint
Representing Serbia
World U23 Championships
Silver medal – second place	2021 Montemor-o-Velho	K-1 500 m
European U23 Championships
Gold medal – first place	2019 Racice	K-2 500 m
Silver medal – second place	2018 Auronzo di Cadore	K-2 500 m
European Junior Championships
Gold medal – first place	2017 Belgrade	K-1 500 m
Gold medal – first place	2016 Plovdiv	K-2 500 m
Silver medal – second place	2016 Plovdiv	K-1 500 m
Bronze medal – third place	2015 Pitesti	K-1 500 m

Marija Dostanić (Serbian Cyrillic: Марија Достанић, born 29 July 1999) is a Serbian sprint canoer. Her last victories are the women's k-2 500m with Biljana Relić in the European Sprint Championships U-23 2019 and the women's k-1 500m kayak single in the European Junior Sprint Championships 2017.

She finished 15th in the K-1 1000 metres event at the 2018 Canoe Sprint World Championships, and also competed in the K-4 500 metres event at the 2019 Canoe Sprint World Championships and the K-2 500 metres event at the 2019 European Games.
