= Sarah Brüßler =

German canoeist (born 1994)

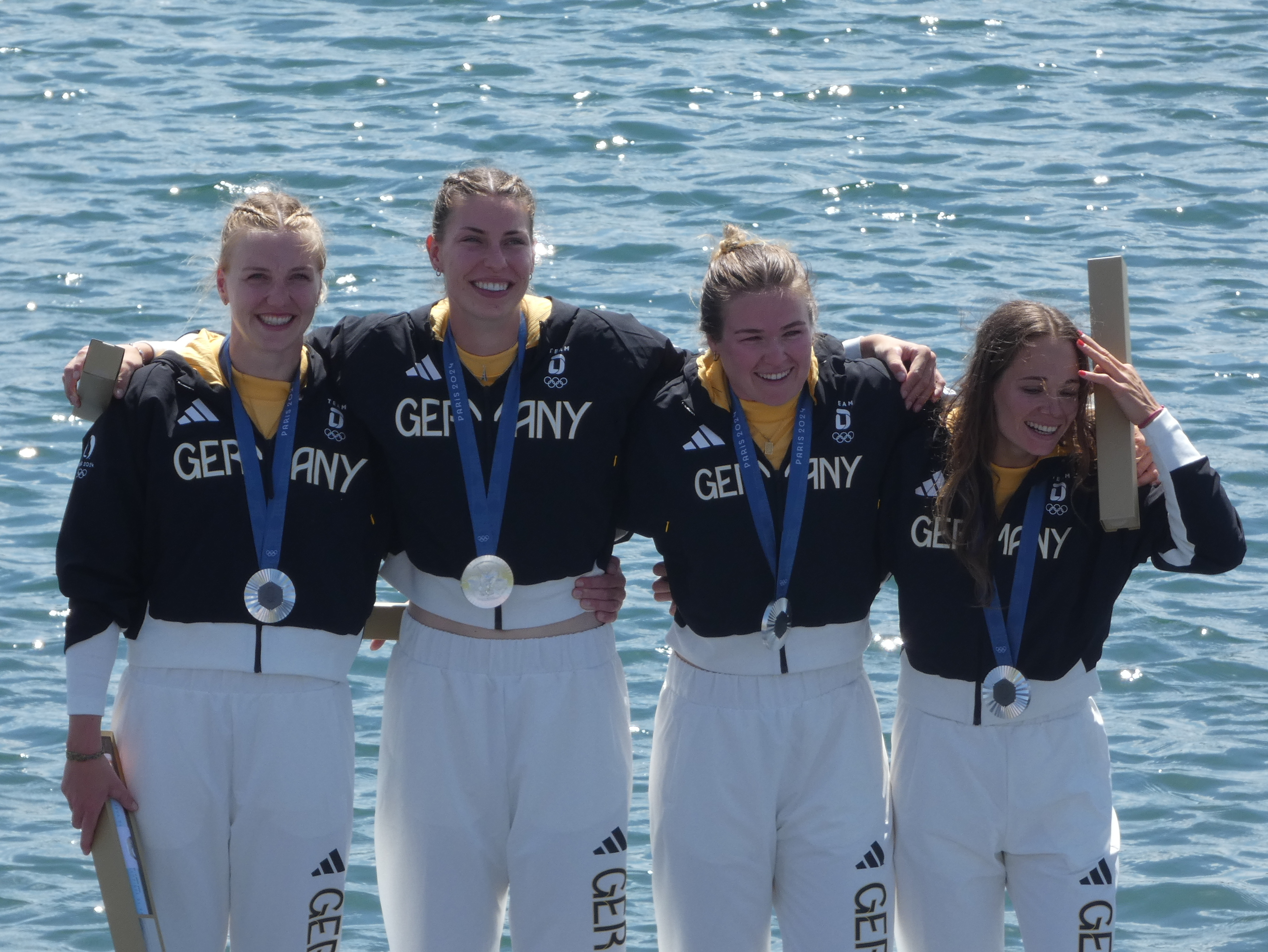

Personal information
- Nationality: German
- Born: 8 April 1994 (age 32) Kassel, Germany
- Height: 180 cm (5 ft 11 in)
- Weight: 72 kg (159 lb)

Sport
- Country: Germany
- Sport: Sprint kayak
- Event: Kayaking
- Club: Rheinbrüder Karlsruhe
Medal record
Women's canoe sprint
Representing Germany
Olympic Games
Silver medal – second place	2024 Paris	K-4 500 m
World Championships
Silver medal – second place	2019 Szeged	K-2 1000 m
Bronze medal – third place	2018 Montemor-o-Velho	K-2 1000 m
European Championships
Silver medal – second place	2018 Belgrade	K-2 1000 m

Sarah Brüßler (also transliterated as Bruessler, born 8 April 1994) is a German sprint canoeist. She competed at the 2020 Summer Olympics, in the Women's K-2 500 metres.

== Career ==
She is studying at University of Mannheim. She participated at the 2018 ICF Canoe Sprint World Championships, winning a medal. and 2019 ICF Canoe Sprint World Championships,
