= Tara Vaughan =

New Zealand canoeist (born 2003)

Personal information
- Born: 28 December 2003 (age 22) Wellington, New Zealand

Sport
- Country: New Zealand
- Sport: Sprint kayak
- Club: North Shore Canoe Club
- Coached by: Gordon Walker
Medal record
Women's canoe sprint
Representing New Zealand
Olympic Games
Gold medal – first place	2024 Paris	K-4 500 m
World Championships
Gold medal – first place	2023 Duisburg	K-4 500 m

Tara Vaughan (born 28 December 2003) is a New Zealand canoeist. She competed in the women's K-4 500 metres at the 2024 Summer Olympics, where she won a gold medal with the New Zealand team.
