= Olivia Brett =

New Zealand canoeist (born 2001)

Personal information
- Born: 18 June 2001 (age 25) Christchurch, New Zealand
- Height: 172 cm (5 ft 8 in)

Sport
- Country: New Zealand
- Sport: Sprint kayak
- Club: Arawa Canoe club
- Coached by: Gordon Walker
Medal record
Women's canoe sprint
Representing New Zealand
Olympic Games
Gold medal – first place	2024 Paris	K-4 500 m
World Championships
Gold medal – first place	2023 Duisburg	K-4 500 m

Olivia Brett (born 18 June 2001) is a New Zealand canoeist. She won gold with the New Zealand team in the women's K-4 500 metres at the 2024 Summer Olympics.

Brett was selected for the K4 at the 2025 ICF Canoe Sprint World Championships in Milan, Italy, but when she injured her forearm in training, was replaced by Lisa Carrington.
