= Dominika Putto =

Polish canoeist

Personal information
- Nationality: Polish
- Born: Dominika Włodarczyk; 22 June 1993 (age 33) Mrągowo, Poland
- Home town: Bydgoszcz, Poland
- Spouse: Dawid Putto (m. 2020)

Sport
- Country: Poland
- Sport: Sprint kayak
Medal record
World Championships
Gold medal – first place	2022 Dartmouth	K-4 500 m
Silver medal – second place	2023 Duisburg	K-4 500 m
Bronze medal – third place	2021 Copenhagen	K-2 200 m
Bronze medal – third place	2023 Duisburg	K-1 200 m
European Championships
Gold medal – first place	2022 Munich	K-4 500 m
Silver medal – second place	2022 Munich	K-2 200 m
Silver medal – second place	2026 Montemor-o-Velho	K-4 500 m
European Games
Gold medal – first place	2023 Kraków–Małopolska	K-4 500 m

Dominika Putto (née Włodarczyk, born 22 June 1993) is a Polish sprint canoeist.

She competed at the 2021 ICF Canoe Sprint World Championships, winning a medal in the K-2 200 m distance.

== Personal life ==
Previously known as Dominika Włodarczyk, she married kayaker Dawid Putto in the fall of 2020. She was born in Mrągowo, and resides in Bydgoszcz as of 2024.
