= Alexandra Clarke =

Canadian ice hockey official

- Born: Drake, Saskatchewan, Canada
- Position: Defence
- Played for: College of St. Scholastica

Alexandra Clarke is a Canadian ice hockey official, serving as a linesperson in the Professional Women's Hockey League (PWHL) and in international competition. In 2021, she became the first woman to serve as a linesperson in the Western Hockey League (WHL) and the Canadian Hockey League (CHL).

A retired ice hockey defenceman, Clarke played four seasons of NCAA Division III hockey at the College of St. Scholastica in Duluth, Minnesota, serving as team captain in her final season (2014–15).

== Playing career ==
Clarke played four years at the College of St. Scholastica, appearing in 107 regular season games and recording 63 points (12 goals, 51 assists) as a defenceman. In 2015, she was drafted 53rd overall by the Calgary Inferno of the Canadian Women's Hockey League (CWHL). Her playing career ended in 2015 after a knee injury, which she later attributed to being kicked by a cow on her family farm, resulting in a lingering issue that prevented her from training and attending camp.

== Officiating career ==
After retiring as a player, Clarke began officiating with Hockey Saskatchewan. She worked in Saskatchewan leagues including the Saskatchewan Female U18 AAA Hockey League and Saskatchewan Junior Hockey League (SJHL), and earned international assignments at IIHF events, including the IIHF Women's World Championship.

On September 24, 2021, Clarke became the first woman to serve as a linesperson in WHL and CHL history when she officiated a WHL preseason game between the Regina Pats and Moose Jaw Warriors at Mosaic Place in Moose Jaw. On December 5, 2021, she became the first woman to work a game in the American Hockey League (AHL).

Clarke officiated as a linesperson at the 2022 Olympic Winter Games (women's tournament). In 2024, she began working games in the newly formed Professional Women's Hockey League and was named among the on-ice officials for the PWHL 3-on-3 Showcase during NHL All-Star Weekend.

In 2025, Clarke was selected by the International Ice Hockey Federation (IIHF) as an on-ice official for the women's tournament at the 2026 Olympic Winter Games. She was also listed among the Canadian officials named by Hockey Canada for Milano–Cortina 2026. During the 2026 Games, Clarke discussed her officiating path and workload across leagues including the PWHL, AHL, and WHL in an interview on Saskatchewan radio.

== Awards and honors ==
Western Hockey League

- First woman to serve as a linesperson in WHL and CHL history (WHL preseason, Regina Pats vs. Moose Jaw Warriors, September 24, 2021).

American Hockey League

- First woman to work a game in the AHL (December 5, 2021).

Olympic Games

- Selected as a linesperson for the 2022 Olympic Winter Games (women's tournament).
- Selected by the IIHF as an on-ice official for the women's tournament at the 2026 Olympic Winter Games.
