= Adrianna Kąkol =

Polish sprint canoeist medalist

Personal information
- Born: September 9, 2001 (age 24)

Sport
- Country: Poland
- Sport: Canoe sprint
- Club: KKW 1929 Kraków

Adrianna Kąkol (born 9 September 2001) is a Polish sprint canoeist and medalist at World and European Championships.

== Career ==
Kąkol is an athlete at Kolejowy Klub Kajakowy 1929 Kraków, where she began training at the age of 11.

In 2021, she won a bronze medal at the European U23 Championships in the K-2 200 meters event (with Katarzyna Kołodziejczyk). In 2022, she became the World Champion and European Champion in the K-4 500 meters event. In 2023, she won the European Games (which also served as the European Championship) in the same event and became the World Vice-Champion (in all events alongside Karolina Naja, Anna Puławska, and Dominika Putto).

In the 2022 Przegląd Sportowy Plebiscite for the best athlete of the year, she and her teammates Karolina Naja, Anna Puławska, and Dominika Putto finished in 21st place. In the same plebiscite in 2023, she was chosen as the Olympic Hope for Paris 2024.
