= Alida Dóra Gazsó =

Hungarian sprint canoeist

Personal information
- Nationality: Hungarian
- Born: 18 April 2000 (age 26) Budapest, Hungary

Sport
- Country: Hungary
- Sport: Sprint kayak
Medal record
Women's sprint kayak
Representing Hungary
Olympic Games
| Silver medal – second place | 2024 Paris | K-2 500 m |
| Bronze medal – third place | 2024 Paris | K-4 500 m |
World Championships
| Gold medal – first place | 2019 Szeged | K-4 500 m |
| Gold medal – first place | 2021 Copenhagen | K-1 1000 m |
| Silver medal – second place | 2021 Copenhagen | K-4 500 m |
European Games
| Silver medal – second place | 2023 Kraków-Małopolska | K-1 500 m |
| Bronze medal – third place | 2023 Kraków-Małopolska | K-2 500 m |
European Championships
| Gold medal – first place | 2021 Poznań | K-1 1000 m |
| Gold medal – first place | 2024 Szeged | K-4 500 m |
| Bronze medal – third place | 2022 Munich | K-4 500 m |
| Bronze medal – third place | 2024 Szeged | K-2 500 m |

Alida Dóra Gazsó (born 18 April 2000) is a Hungarian sprint canoeist.

She won a medal at the 2019 ICF Canoe Sprint World Championships.
