= 2019 ICF Canoe Sprint World Championships – Women's K-1 500 metres =

Women's K-1 500 metres at the 2019 ICF Canoe Sprint World Championships
- Venue: Olympic Centre of Szeged
- Location: Szeged, Hungary
- Dates: 23–25 August
- Competitors: 42 from 42 nations
- Winning time: 1:55.76

Medalists
gold medal	Lisa Carrington	New Zealand
silver medal	Volha Khudzenka	Belarus
bronze medal	Danuta Kozák	Hungary

The women's K-1 500 metres competition at the 2019 ICF Canoe Sprint World Championships in Szeged took place at the Olympic Centre of Szeged.

== Schedule ==
The schedule was as follows:

Date	Time	Round
Friday 23 August 2019	09:00	Heats
Saturday 24 August 2019	15:00	Semifinals
Sunday 25 August 2019	10:20	Final C
Sunday 25 August 2019	10:26	Final B
Sunday 25 August 2019	11:44	Final A

All times are Central European Summer Time (UTC+2)

== Results ==
=== Heats ===
The five fastest boats in each heat, plus the two fastest sixth-place boats advanced to the semifinals.

==== Heat 1 ====
Rank	Kayaker	Country	Time	Notes
1	Lisa Carrington	New Zealand	1:48.90	QS
2	Esti van Tonder	South Africa	1:51.00	QS
3	Rebeka Simon	Great Britain	1:51.60	QS
4	Justyna Iskrzycka	Poland	1:52.02	QS
5	Carolina García	Spain	1:55.24	QS
6	Madara Aldiņa	Latvia	1:56.79	
7	Anfel Arabi	Algeria	2:08.87	
–	Melanie Waite	Malta	DNS	

==== Heat 2 ====
Rank	Kayaker	Country	Time	Notes
1	Emma Jørgensen	Denmark	1:50.87	QS
2	Pauliina Polet	Finland	1:52.62	QS
3	Gai Xiaomei	China	1:53.16	QS
4	Cristina Petracca	Italy	1:53.29	QS
5	Viktoria Schwarz	Austria	1:53.70	QS
6	Inna Klinova	Kazakhstan	1:55.97	qS
7	Jitta van der Laan	Netherlands	1:56.05	
8	Lee Sun-ja	South Korea	1:56.54	
9	Stevani Maysche Ibo	Indonesia	1:58.12	

==== Heat 3 ====
Rank	Kayaker	Country	Time	Notes
1	Volha Khudzenka	Belarus	1:48.08	QS
2	Milica Starović	Serbia	1:50.32	QS
3	Svetlana Chernigovskaya	Russia	1:51.01	QS
4	Jennifer Egan	Ireland	1:53.54	QS
5	Aleksandra Grishina	Bulgaria	1:53.61	QS
6	Tetyana Yednak	Ukraine	1:55.58	qS
7	Iuliana Ţăran	Romania	1:59.29	
8	Netta Malkinson	Israel	1:59.85	
9	Chou Ju-chuan	Chinese Taipei	2:00.59	

==== Heat 4 ====
Rank	Kayaker	Country	Time	Notes
1	Linnea Stensils	Sweden	1:51.10	QS
2	Danuta Kozák	Hungary	1:51.66	QS
3	Hilal Avcı	Turkey	1:52.64	QS
4	Anamaria Govorčinović	Croatia	1:53.63	QS
5	Madeline Schmidt	Canada	1:54.52	QS
6	Stephenie Chen Jiexian	Singapore	1:56.17	
7	Samantha Barlow	United States	2:00.38	
8	Samaa Ahmed	Egypt	2:15.79	

==== Heat 5 ====
Rank	Kayaker	Country	Time	Notes
1	Manon Hostens	France	1:50.63	QS
2	Ivana Mládková	Slovakia	1:51.43	QS
3	Conny Waßmuth	Germany	1:52.11	QS
4	Catherine McArthur	Australia	1:53.16	QS
5	Franziska Widmer	Switzerland	1:54.79	QS
6	Elnaz Shafieian Noveir	Iran	1:57.24	
7	Mia Medved	Slovenia	1:57.85	
8	Ysumy Orellana	Chile	1:58.56	

=== Semifinals ===
Qualification in each semi was as follows:

The fastest three boats advanced to the A final.
The next three fastest boats advanced to the B final.
The seventh, eighth and ninth-place boats advanced to the C final.

==== Semifinal 1 ====
Rank	Kayaker	Country	Time	Notes
1	Milica Starović	Serbia	1:56.02	QA
2	Manon Hostens	France	1:56.86	QA
3	Emma Jørgensen	Denmark	1:56.90	QA
4	Justyna Iskrzycka	Poland	1:56.93	QB
5	Viktoria Schwarz	Austria	1:57.73	QB
6	Anamaria Govorčinović	Croatia	1:58.58	QB
7	Esti van Tonder	South Africa	1:58.58	QC
8	Catherine McArthur	Australia	1:58.91	QC
9	Hilal Avcı	Turkey	2:01.32	QC

==== Semifinal 2 ====
Rank	Kayaker	Country	Time	Notes
1	Lisa Carrington	New Zealand	1:54.62	QA
2	Danuta Kozák	Hungary	1:55.56	QA
3	Svetlana Chernigovskaya	Russia	1:57.33	QA
4	Ivana Mládková	Slovakia	1:57.74	QB
5	Aleksandra Grishina	Bulgaria	1:58.81	QB
6	Cristina Petracca	Italy	1:59.04	QB
7	Carolina García	Spain	1:59.06	QC
8	Franziska Widmer	Switzerland	1:59.84	QC
9	Inna Klinova	Kazakhstan	2:07.49	QC

==== Semifinal 3 ====
Rank	Kayaker	Country	Time	Notes
1	Volha Khudzenka	Belarus	1:54.23	QA
2	Linnea Stensils	Sweden	1:55.26	QA
3	Rebeka Simon	Great Britain	1:55.88	QA
4	Pauliina Polet	Finland	1:57.14	QB
5	Gai Xiaomei	China	1:58.49	QB
6	Conny Waßmuth	Germany	1:59.14	QB
7	Madeline Schmidt	Canada	1:59.96	QC
8	Jennifer Egan	Ireland	2:00.01	QC
9	Tetyana Yednak	Ukraine	2:00.17	QC

=== Finals ===
==== Final C ====
Competitors in this final raced for positions 19 to 27.

Rank	Kayaker	Country	Time
1	Esti van Tonder	South Africa	1:57.79
2	Catherine McArthur	Australia	1:58.50
3	Hilal Avcı	Turkey	1:59.18
4	Carolina García	Spain	2:00.11
5	Franziska Widmer	Switzerland	2:01.15
6	Madeline Schmidt	Canada	2:02.27
7	Inna Klinova	Kazakhstan	2:02.52
8	Jennifer Egan	Ireland	2:03.27
9	Tetyana Yednak	Ukraine	2:06.90

==== Final B ====
Competitors in this final raced for positions 10 to 18.

Rank	Kayaker	Country	Time
1	Justyna Iskrzycka	Poland	1:57.99
2	Ivana Mládková	Slovakia	1:59.06
3	Pauliina Polet	Finland	1:59.41
4	Anamaria Govorčinović	Croatia	1:59.91
5	Viktoria Schwarz	Austria	2:00.07
6	Conny Waßmuth	Germany	2:01.30
7	Aleksandra Grishina	Bulgaria	2:01.63
8	Cristina Petracca	Italy	2:01.65
9	Gai Xiaomei	China	2:02.83

==== Final A ====
Competitors in this final raced for positions 1 to 9, with medals going to the top three.

Rank	Kayaker	Country	Time
1st place, gold medalist(s)	Lisa Carrington	New Zealand	1:55.76
2nd place, silver medalist(s)	Volha Khudzenka	Belarus	1:57.39
3rd place, bronze medalist(s)	Danuta Kozák	Hungary	1:58.01
4	Milica Starović	Serbia	1:59.19
5	Emma Jørgensen	Denmark	1:59.69
6	Linnea Stensils	Sweden	2:01.37
7	Rebeka Simon	Great Britain	2:01.43
8	Svetlana Chernigovskaya	Russia	2:04.71
9	Manon Hostens	France	2:04.97
