= Canoe sprint at the 2015 European Games – Women's K-1 200 metres =

Women's K-1 200 metres at the 2015 European Games
- Venue: Kur Sport and Rowing Centre, Mingachevir
- Date: 15–16 June
- Competitors: 27 from 27 nations
- Winning time: 40.795

Medalists
gold medal	Marta Walczykiewicz	Poland
silver medal	Natalia Podolskaya	Russia
bronze medal	Danuta Kozák	Hungary

The women's K-1 200 metres canoe sprint competition at the 2015 European Games in Baku took place between 15 and 16 June at the Kur Sport and Rowing Centre in Mingachevir.

== Schedule ==
The schedule was as follows:

Date	Time	Round
Monday 15 June 2015	14:00	Heats
Monday 15 June 2015	16:00	Semifinals
Tuesday 16 June 2015	15:05	Finals

All times are Azerbaijan Summer Time (UTC+5)

== Results ==
=== Heats ===
Heat winners advanced directly to the A final. The next six fastest boats in each heat advanced to the semifinals.

==== Heat 1 ====
Rank	Kayaker	Country	Time	Notes
1	Danuta Kozák	Hungary	40.629	QA, GB
2	Sarah Guyot	France	40.750	QS
3	Linnea Stensils	Sweden	41.328	QS
4	Svitlana Rymkevych	Ukraine	42.566	QS
5	Isabel Contreras	Spain	43.226	QS
6	Federica Nole	Italy	44.176	QS
7	Vlada Kosytska	Georgia	45.324	QS
8	Madara Aldiņa	Latvia	46.125	
9	Brigita Bakić	Croatia	46.546	

==== Heat 2 ====
Rank	Kayaker	Country	Time	Notes
1	Natalia Podolskaya	Russia	40.286	QA, GB
2	Teresa Portela	Portugal	41.330	QS
3	Sabine Volz	Germany	41.478	QS
4	Špela Ponomarenko Janić	Slovenia	41.775	QS
5	Inna Osypenko-Radomska	Azerbaijan	41.968	QS
6	Lasma Liepa	Turkey	42.080	QS
7	Rachel Cawthorn	Great Britain	42.254	QS
8	Anelė Šakalytė	Lithuania	46.115	
–	Olga Babić	Bosnia and Herzegovina	DNS	

==== Heat 3 ====
Rank	Kayaker	Country	Time	Notes
1	Marta Walczykiewicz	Poland	40.427	QA
2	Yvonne Schuring	Austria	41.519	QS
3	Volha Khudzenka	Belarus	41.779	QS
4	Nikolina Moldovan	Serbia	41.903	QS
5	Martina Kohlová	Slovakia	42.409	QS
6	Jennifer Egan	Ireland	42.843	QS
7	Michaela Mlezivová	Czech Republic	44.533	QS
8	Sofia Pipitsouli	Greece	45.270	
9	Natalia Gulco	Moldova	46.911	

=== Semifinals ===
The fastest three boats in each semi advanced to the A final. The next four fastest boats in each semi, plus the fastest remaining boat advanced to the B final.

==== Semifinal 1 ====
Rank	Kayaker	Country	Time	Notes
1	Nikolina Moldovan	Serbia	39.653	QA, GB
2	Sabine Volz	Germany	39.736	QA
3	Linnea Stensils	Sweden	40.137	QA
4	Yvonne Schuring	Austria	40.502	QB
5	Špela Ponomarenko Janić	Slovenia	40.761	QB
6	Isabel Contreras	Spain	41.140	QB
7	Lasma Liepa	Turkey	42.000	QB
8	Michaela Mlezivová	Czech Republic	42.533	qB
9	Federica Nole	Italy	44.570	

==== Semifinal 2 ====
Rank	Kayaker	Country	Time	Notes
1	Inna Osypenko-Radomska	Azerbaijan	40.163	QA
2	Sarah Guyot	France	40.423	QA
3	Rachel Cawthorn	Great Britain	40.462	QA
4	Martina Kohlová	Slovakia	40.540	QB
5	Teresa Portela	Portugal	40.675	QB
6	Volha Khudzenka	Belarus	41.505	QB
7	Svitlana Rymkevych	Ukraine	42.064	QB
8	Jennifer Egan	Ireland	42.657	
9	Vlada Kosytska	Georgia	45.810	

=== Finals ===
==== Final B ====
Competitors in this final raced for positions 10 to 18.

Rank	Kayaker	Country	Time
1	Teresa Portela	Portugal	42.627
2	Volha Khudzenka	Belarus	42.789
3	Yvonne Schuring	Austria	42.906
4	Martina Kohlová	Slovakia	43.065
5	Špela Ponomarenko Janić	Slovenia	43.241
6	Lasma Liepa	Turkey	43.800
7	Isabel Contreras	Spain	44.240
8	Svitlana Rymkevych	Ukraine	45.483
9	Michaela Mlezivová	Czech Republic	46.294

==== Final A ====
Competitors in this final raced for positions 1 to 9, with medals going to the top three.

Rank	Kayaker	Country	Time
1st place, gold medalist(s)	Marta Walczykiewicz	Poland	40.795
2nd place, silver medalist(s)	Natalia Podolskaya	Russia	41.165
3rd place, bronze medalist(s)	Danuta Kozák	Hungary	41.378
4	Sarah Guyot	France	41.419
5	Nikolina Moldovan	Serbia	42.007
6	Inna Osypenko-Radomska	Azerbaijan	42.091
7	Linnea Stensils	Sweden	42.179
8	Sabine Volz	Germany	42.454
9	Rachel Cawthorn	Great Britain	43.455
