= 2021 ICF Canoe Sprint World Championships – Women's K-1 500 metres =

Women's K-1 500 metres at the 2021 ICF Canoe Sprint World Championships
- Venue: Lake Bagsværd
- Location: Copenhagen, Denmark
- Dates: 17–19 September
- Competitors: 24 from 24 nations
- Winning time: 1:48.08

Medalists
gold medal	Aimee Fisher	New Zealand
silver medal	Tamara Csipes	Hungary
bronze medal	Emma Jørgensen	Denmark

The women's K-1 500 metres competition at the 2021 ICF Canoe Sprint World Championships in Copenhagen took place on Lake Bagsværd.

== Schedule ==
The schedule was as follows:

Date	Time	Round
Friday 17 September 2021	09:45	Heats
Friday 17 September 2021	16:25	Semifinals
Sunday 19 September 2021	10:30	Final B
Sunday 19 September 2021	11:19	Final A

All times are Central European Summer Time (UTC+2)

== Results ==
=== Heats ===
Heat winners advanced directly to the A final.
The next six fastest boats in each heat advanced to the semifinals.

==== Heat 1 ====
Rank	Kayaker	Country	Time	Notes
1	Aimee Fisher	New Zealand	1:54.97	QA
2	Mariya Povkh	Ukraine	2:00.44	QS
3	Milica Novaković	Serbia	2:01.62	QS
4	Manon Hostens	France	2:01.93	QS
5	Deborah Kerr	Great Britain	2:01.94	QS
6	Agata Fantini	Italy	2:03.21	QS
7	Małgorzata Puławska	Poland	2:03.35	QS
8	Netta Malinen	Finland	2:05.92	

==== Heat 2 ====
Rank	Kayaker	Country	Time	Notes
1	Tamara Csipes	Hungary	1:57.02	QA
2	Linnea Stensils	Sweden	1:59.91	QS
3	Paulina Paszek	Germany	2:00.28	QS
4	Svetlana Chernigovskaya	RCF	2:03.70	QS
5	Michelle Russell	Canada	2:04.67	QS
6	Chen Jiexian	Singapore	2:05.58	QS
7	Jennifer Egan	Ireland	2:05.77	QS
8	Esti Olivier	South Africa	2:15.95	

==== Heat 3 ====
Rank	Kayaker	Country	Time	Notes
1	Emma Jørgensen	Denmark	1:59.15	QA
2	Anežka Paloudová	Czech Republic	2:01.23	QS
3	Teresa Portela	Portugal	2:01.34	QS
4	Isabel Contreras	Spain	2:01.55	QS
5	Anamaria Govorčinović	Croatia	2:01.83	QS
6	Ruth Vorsselman	Netherlands	2:03.28	QS
7	Madara Aldiņa	Latvia	2:03.93	QS
8	Mariana Petrušová	Slovakia	2:10.41	

=== Semifinals ===
Qualification was as follows:

The fastest three boats in each semi advanced to the A final.
The next four fastest boats in each semi, plus the fastest remaining boat advanced to the B final.

==== Semifinal 1 ====
Rank	Kayaker	Country	Time	Notes
1	Mariya Povkh	Ukraine	1:53.12	QA
2	Teresa Portela	Portugal	1:53.79	QA
3	Paulina Paszek	Germany	1:53.85	QA
4	Isabel Contreras	Spain	1:54.90	QB
5	Agata Fantini	Italy	1:55.51	QB
6	Manon Hostens	France	1:56.23	QB
7	Michelle Russell	Canada	1:56.85	QB
8	Ruth Vorsselman	Netherlands	1:58.36	qB
9	Jennifer Egan	Ireland	2:00.36	

==== Semifinal 2 ====
Rank	Kayaker	Country	Time	Notes
1	Linnea Stensils	Sweden	1:53.18	QA
2	Milica Novaković	Serbia	1:53.36	QA
3	Anežka Paloudová	Czech Republic	1:54.81	QA
4	Deborah Kerr	Great Britain	1:55.02	QB
5	Małgorzata Puławska	Poland	1:56.00	QB
6	Madara Aldiņa	Latvia	1:58.18	QB
7	Anamaria Govorčinović	Croatia	1:58.44	QB
8	Chen Jiexian	Singapore	1:59.18	
9	Svetlana Chernigovskaya	RCF	2:03.24	

=== Finals ===
==== Final B ====
Competitors in this final raced for positions 10 to 18.

Rank	Kayaker	Country	Time
1	Anamaria Govorčinović	Croatia	1:53.83
2	Isabel Contreras	Spain	1:54.18
3	Deborah Kerr	Great Britain	1:54.73
4	Manon Hostens	France	1:54.95
5	Małgorzata Puławska	Poland	1:55.57
6	Michelle Russell	Canada	1:56.68
7	Agata Fantini	Italy	1:56.96
8	Ruth Vorsselman	Netherlands	1:58.00
9	Madara Aldiņa	Latvia	2:00.69

==== Final A ====
Competitors raced for positions 1 to 9, with medals going to the top three.

Rank	Kayaker	Country	Time
1st place, gold medalist(s)	Aimee Fisher	New Zealand	1:48.08
2nd place, silver medalist(s)	Tamara Csipes	Hungary	1:49.00
3rd place, bronze medalist(s)	Emma Jørgensen	Denmark	1:49.85
4	Linnea Stensils	Sweden	1:51.16
5	Mariya Povkh	Ukraine	1:51.33
6	Teresa Portela	Portugal	1:51.97
7	Paulina Paszek	Germany	1:53.50
8	Milica Novaković	Serbia	1:54.35
9	Anežka Paloudová	Czech Republic	1:55.07
