= Canoe sprint at the 2023 European Games – Women's K-1 500 metres =

Women's K-1 500 metres at the 2023 European Games
- Venue: Kryspinów Waterway
- Date: 23–24 June
- Competitors: 23 from 23 nations
- Winning time: 1:49.494

Medalists
gold medal	Emma Jørgensen	Denmark
silver medal	Alida Dóra Gazsó	Hungary
bronze medal	Milica Novaković	Serbia

The women's K-1 500 metres canoe sprint competition at the 2023 European Games took place on 23 and 24 June at the Kryspinów Waterway.

== Schedule ==
All times are local (UTC+2).

Date	Time	Round
Friday, 23 June 2023	9:37	Heats
Friday, 23 June 2023	16:44	Semifinals
Saturday, 24 June 2023	12:07	Final B
Saturday, 24 June 2023	12:30	Final A

== Results ==
=== Heats ===
==== Heat 1 ====
Rank	Kayaker	Country	Time	Notes
1	Katarzyna Kołodziejczyk	Poland	1:55.815	QA
2	Joana Vasconcelos	Portugal	1:56.991	QS
3	Anežka Paloudová	Czech Republic	1:58.221	QS
4	Franziska Widmer	Switzerland	1:59.745	QS
5	Hilal Avcı	Turkey	2:00.028	QS
6	Maria Virik	Norway	2:01.295	QS
7	Jennifer Egan-Simmons	Ireland	2:05.032	QS
8	Camelia Mincă	Romania	2:10.316	

==== Heat 2 ====
Rank	Kayaker	Country	Time	Notes
1	Alida Dóra Gazsó	Hungary	1:54.073	QA
2	Milica Novaković	Serbia	1:55.103	QS
3	Pauline Jagsch	Germany	1:55.113	QS
4	Melina Andersson	Sweden	1:55.473	QS
5	Isabel Contreras	Spain	1:57.360	QS
6	Madara Aldiņa	Latvia	2:00.123	QS
7	Darya Budouskaya	Israel	2:01.127	QS
8	Netta Malinen	Finland	2:02.524	

==== Heat 3 ====
Rank	Kayaker	Country	Time	Notes
1	Emma Jørgensen	Denmark	1:53.343	QA
2	Mariya Povkh	Ukraine	1:54.246	QS
3	Anamaria Govorčinović	Croatia	1:54.680	QS
4	Agata Fantini	Italy	1:57.530	QS
5	Aleksandra Mihalashvili	Bulgaria	1:58.123	QS
6	Vanina Paoletti	France	1:59.283	QS
7	Špela Ponomarenko Janić	Slovenia	1:59.340	QS

=== Semifinals ===
==== Semifinal 1 ====
Rank	Kayaker	Country	Time	Notes
1	Melina Andersson	Sweden	1:53.520	QA
2	Pauline Jagsch	Germany	1:53.804	QA
3	Anežka Paloudová	Czech Republic	1:54.261	QA
4	Mariya Povkh	Ukraine	1:54.821	QB
5	Agata Fantini	Italy	1:55.847	QB
6	Špela Ponomarenko Janić	Slovenia	1:56.399	QB
7	Hilal Avcı	Turkey	1:58.391	QB
8	Maria Virik	Norway	1:59.319	qB
9	Madara Aldiņa	Latvia	1:59.671	

==== Semifinal 2 ====
Rank	Kayaker	Country	Time	Notes
1	Anamaria Govorčinović	Croatia	1:53.051	QA
2	Milica Novaković	Serbia	1:53.535	QA
3	Joana Vasconcelos	Portugal	1:54.407	QA
4	Isabel Contreras	Spain	1:55.905	QB
5	Franziska Widmer	Switzerland	1:57.125	QB
6	Vanina Paoletti	France	1:57.817	QB
7	Aleksandra Mihalashvili	Bulgaria	1:58.149	QB
8	Darya Budouskaya	Israel	2:00.993	
9	Jennifer Egan-Simmons	Ireland	2:02.693	

=== Finals ===
==== Final B ====
Rank	Kayaker	Country	Time
10	Mariya Povkh	Ukraine	1:52.302
11	Vanina Paoletti	France	1:52.650
12	Agata Fantini	Italy	1:53.152
13	Špela Ponomarenko Janić	Slovenia	1:53.340
14	Isabel Contreras	Spain	1:54.787
15	Aleksandra Mihalashvili	Bulgaria	1:55.763
16	Franziska Widmer	Switzerland	1:55.795
17	Hilal Avcı	Turkey	1:57.633
18	Maria Virik	Norway	1:58.133

==== Final A ====
Rank	Kayaker	Country	Time
1st place, gold medalist(s)	Emma Jørgensen	Denmark	1:49.494
2nd place, silver medalist(s)	Alida Dóra Gazsó	Hungary	1:49.642
3rd place, bronze medalist(s)	Milica Novaković	Serbia	1:50.892
4	Anamaria Govorčinović	Croatia	1:51.512
5	Melina Andersson	Sweden	1:51.612
6	Katarzyna Kołodziejczyk	Poland	1:51.944
7	Anežka Paloudová	Czech Republic	1:52.395
8	Pauline Jagsch	Germany	1:53.041
9	Joana Vasconcelos	Portugal	1:53.613
