= Canoe sprint at the 2019 European Games – Women's K-1 200 metres =

Women's K-1 200 metres at the 2019 European Games
- Venue: Zaslavl Regatta Course
- Date: 26–27 June
- Competitors: 23 from 23 nations
- Winning time: 41.625

Medalists
gold medal	Emma Jørgensen	Denmark
silver medal	Danuta Kozák	Hungary
bronze medal	Marta Walczykiewicz	Poland

The women's K-1 200 metres canoe sprint competition at the 2019 European Games in Minsk took place between 26 and 27 June at the Zaslavl Regatta Course.

== Schedule ==
The schedule was as follows:

Date	Time	Round
Wednesday 26 June 2019	14:00	Heats
Wednesday 26 June 2019	16:00	Semifinals
Thursday 27 June 2019	14:00	Final B
Thursday 27 June 2019	14:20	Final A

All times are Further-eastern European Time (UTC+3)

== Results ==
=== Heats ===
Heat winners advanced directly to the A final. The next six fastest boats in each heat advanced to the semifinals.

==== Heat 1 ====
Rank	Kayaker	Country	Time	Notes
1	Marta Walczykiewicz	Poland	40.958	QA
2	Linnea Stensils	Sweden	41.333	QS
3	Sarah Guyot	France	42.800	QS
4	Francisca Laia	Portugal	43.168	QS
5	Jennifer Egan	Ireland	44.608	QS
6	Maria-Lorena Manolica	Azerbaijan	44.750	QS
7	Anežka Paloudová	Czech Republic	46.283	QS

==== Heat 2 ====
Rank	Kayaker	Country	Time	Notes
1	Danuta Kozák	Hungary	41.206	QA
2	Ivana Mládková	Slovakia	41.776	QS
3	Natalia Podolskaya	Russia	42.338	QS
4	Mariia Kichasova-Skoryk	Ukraine	42.436	QS
5	Francesca Genzo	Italy	43.501	QS
6	Sabrina Hering-Pradler	Germany	44.008	QS
7	Anamaria Govorčinović	Croatia	45.886	QS
8	Netta Malinen	Finland	47.041	

==== Heat 3 ====
Rank	Kayaker	Country	Time	Notes
1	Emma Jørgensen	Denmark	40.514	QA
2	Milica Starović	Serbia	41.339	QS
3	Marharyta Makhneva	Belarus	41.609	QS
4	Anja Osterman	Slovenia	42.074	QS
5	Iuliana Ţăran	Romania	42.084	QS
6	Aida Bauza	Spain	43.382	QS
7	Lasma Liepa	Turkey	43.395	QS
8	Madara Aldiņa	Latvia	43.734	

=== Semifinals ===
The fastest three boats in each semi advanced to the A final. The next four fastest boats in each semi, plus the fastest remaining boat advanced to the B final.

==== Semifinal 1 ====
Rank	Kayaker	Country	Time	Notes
1	Anja Osterman	Slovenia	40.141	QA
2	Marharyta Makhneva	Belarus	40.315	QA
3	Natalia Podolskaya	Russia	40.371	QA
4	Linnea Stensils	Sweden	40.427	QB
5	Francisca Laia	Portugal	40.704	QB
6	Francesca Genzo	Italy	41.924	QB
7	Aida Bauza	Spain	42.674	QB
8	Maria-Lorena Manolica	Azerbaijan	43.071	qB
9	Anamaria Govorčinović	Croatia	45.141	

==== Semifinal 2 ====
Rank	Kayaker	Country	Time	Notes
1	Milica Starović	Serbia	41.305	QA
2	Ivana Mládková	Slovakia	41.357	QA
3	Mariia Kichasova-Skoryk	Ukraine	41.535	QA
4	Iuliana Ţăran	Romania	41.927	QB
5	Sabrina Hering-Pradler	Germany	42.652	QB
6	Sarah Guyot	France	42.742	QB
7	Jennifer Egan	Ireland	43.427	QB
8	Lasma Liepa	Turkey	43.762	
9	Anežka Paloudová	Czech Republic	44.637	

=== Finals ===
==== Final B ====
Competitors in this final raced for positions 10 to 18.

Rank	Kayaker	Country	Time
1	Linnea Stensils	Sweden	43.878
2	Francisca Laia	Portugal	45.816
3	Francesca Genzo	Italy	45.857
4	Sabrina Hering-Pradler	Germany	46.060
5	Sarah Guyot	France	46.886
6	Maria-Lorena Manolica	Azerbaijan	47.298
7	Iuliana Ţăran	Romania	47.561
8	Jennifer Egan	Ireland	47.696
9	Aida Bauza	Spain	47.966

==== Final A ====
Competitors in this final raced for positions 1 to 9, with medals going to the top three.

Rank	Kayaker	Country	Time
1st place, gold medalist(s)	Emma Jørgensen	Denmark	41.625
2nd place, silver medalist(s)	Danuta Kozák	Hungary	42.160
3rd place, bronze medalist(s)	Marta Walczykiewicz	Poland	42.408
4	Anja Osterman	Slovenia	42.640
5	Mariia Kichasova-Skoryk	Ukraine	42.723
6	Ivana Mládková	Slovakia	42.903
7	Milica Starović	Serbia	43.210
8	Marharyta Makhneva	Belarus	43.878
9	Natalia Podolskaya	Russia	44.163
