= Canoe sprint at the 2019 European Games – Women's K-1 500 metres =

Women's K-1 500 metres at the 2019 European Games
- Venue: Zaslavl Regatta Course
- Date: 25–27 June
- Competitors: 23 from 23 nations
- Winning time: 2:03.929

Medalists
gold medal	Volha Khudzenka	Belarus
silver medal	Danuta Kozák	Hungary
bronze medal	Emma Jørgensen	Denmark

The women's K-1 500 metres canoe sprint competition at the 2019 European Games in Minsk took place between 25 and 27 June at the Zaslavl Regatta Course.

== Schedule ==
The schedule was as follows:

Date	Time	Round
Tuesday 25 June 2019	14:00	Heats
Tuesday 25 June 2019	16:52	Semifinals
Thursday 27 June 2019	10:00	Final B
Thursday 27 June 2019	10:10	Final A

All times are Further-eastern European Time (UTC+3)

== Results ==
=== Heats ===
Heat winners advanced directly to the A final. The next six fastest boats in each heat advanced to the semifinals.

==== Heat 1 ====
Rank	Kayaker	Country	Time	Notes
1	Danuta Kozák	Hungary	1:49.442	QA
2	Ivana Mládková	Slovakia	1:50.397	QS
3	Tetyana Yednak	Ukraine	1:50.667	QS
4	Conny Waßmuth	Germany	1:50.797	QS
5	Cristina Petracca	Italy	1:51.119	QS
6	Pauliina Polet	Finland	1:51.299	QS
7	Maria Virik	Norway	1:51.892	QS
8	Roxana Ciur	Romania	1:52.484	
9	Sara Sotero	Portugal	1:57.579	

==== Heat 2 ====
Rank	Kayaker	Country	Time	Notes
1	Volha Khudzenka	Belarus	1:46.465	QA, GB
2	Linnea Stensils	Sweden	1:50.440	QS
3	Emma Jørgensen	Denmark	1:50.590	QS
4	Laia Pélachs	Spain	1:52.465	QS
5	Hilal Avcı	Turkey	1:54.538	QS
6	Madara Aldiņa	Latvia	1:54.598	QS
7	Jennifer Egan	Ireland	1:54.733	QS

==== Heat 3 ====
Rank	Kayaker	Country	Time	Notes
1	Milica Starović	Serbia	1:47.522	QA
2	Anna Puławska	Poland	1:48.115	QS
3	Svetlana Chernigovskaya	Russia	1:49.412	QS
4	Anja Osterman	Slovenia	1:54.847	QS
5	Claire Bren	France	1:55.697	QS
6	Anamaria Govorčinović	Croatia	1:55.765	QS
7	Anna Kožíšková	Czech Republic	1:55.862	QS

=== Semifinals ===
The fastest three boats in each semi advanced to the A final. The next four fastest boats in each semi, plus the fastest remaining boat advanced to the B final.

==== Semifinal 1 ====
Rank	Kayaker	Country	Time	Notes
1	Anna Puławska	Poland	1:49.796	QA
2	Emma Jørgensen	Denmark	1:50.419	QA
3	Anja Osterman	Slovenia	1:51.116	QA
4	Pauliina Polet	Finland	1:52.801	QB
5	Anna Kožíšková	Czech Republic	1:53.879	QB
6	Laia Pélachs	Spain	1:54.811	QB
7	Tetyana Yednak	Ukraine	1:55.104	QB
8	Cristina Petracca	Italy	1:56.111	
9	Madara Aldiņa	Latvia	1:57.304	

==== Semifinal 2 ====
Rank	Kayaker	Country	Time	Notes
1	Svetlana Chernigovskaya	Russia	1:50.068	QA
2	Linnea Stensils	Sweden	1:50.096	QA
3	Ivana Mládková	Slovakia	1:50.246	QA
4	Conny Waßmuth	Germany	1:52.649	QB
5	Jennifer Egan	Ireland	1:52.671	QB
6	Hilal Avcı	Turkey	1:53.769	QB
7	Maria Virik	Norway	1:53.859	QB
8	Anamaria Govorčinović	Croatia	1:53.904	qB
9	Claire Bren	France	1:54.196	

=== Finals ===
==== Final B ====
Competitors in this final raced for positions 10 to 18.

Rank	Kayaker	Country	Time
1	Pauliina Polet	Finland	2:06.500
2	Maria Virik	Norway	2:08.363
3	Conny Waßmuth	Germany	2:09.238
4	Anamaria Govorčinović	Croatia	2:09.813
5	Laia Pélachs	Spain	2:10.315
6	Tetyana Yednak	Ukraine	2:10.715
7	Hilal Avcı	Turkey	2:11.248
8	Jennifer Egan	Ireland	2:11.663
9	Anna Kožíšková	Czech Republic	2:12.420

==== Final A ====
Competitors in this final raced for positions 1 to 9, with medals going to the top three.

Rank	Kayaker	Country	Time
1st place, gold medalist(s)	Volha Khudzenka	Belarus	2:03.929
2nd place, silver medalist(s)	Danuta Kozák	Hungary	2:04.176
3rd place, bronze medalist(s)	Emma Jørgensen	Denmark	2:04.989
4	Milica Starović	Serbia	2:06.226
5	Ivana Mládková	Slovakia	2:07.999
6	Anna Puławska	Poland	2:08.164
7	Anja Osterman	Slovenia	2:09.721
8	Linnea Stensils	Sweden	2:10.449
9	Svetlana Chernigovskaya	Russia	2:10.644
