= 2017 ICF Canoe Sprint World Championships – Women's K-1 500 metres =

Women's K-1 500 metres at the 2017 ICF Canoe Sprint World Championships
- Venue: Sportcentrum Račice
- Location: Račice, Czech Republic
- Dates: 24–26 August
- Competitors: 34 from 34 nations
- Winning time: 1:48.421

Medalists
| gold medal | Volha Khudzenka | Belarus |
| silver medal | Lisa Carrington | New Zealand |
| bronze medal | Emma Jørgensen | Denmark |

The women's K-1 500 metres competition at the 2017 ICF Canoe Sprint World Championships in Račice took place at the Sportcentrum Račice.

== Schedule ==
The schedule was as follows:

| Date | Time | Round |
|---|---|---|
| Thursday 24 August 2017 | 08:48 | Heats |
| Thursday 24 August 2017 | 15:42 | Semifinals |
| Saturday 26 August 2017 | 09:15 | Final B |
| Saturday 26 August 2017 | 10:41 | Final A |

All times are Central European Summer Time (UTC+2)

== Results ==
=== Heats ===
The six fastest boats in each heat, plus the three fastest remaining boats advanced to the semifinals.

==== Heat 1 ====
| Rank | Kayaker | Country | Time | Notes |
|---|---|---|---|---|
| 1 | Milica Starović | Serbia | 1:54.339 | QS |
| 2 | Lisa Carrington | New Zealand | 1:54.789 | QS |
| 3 | Jo Brigden-Jones | Australia | 1:55.839 | QS |
| 4 | Ekaterina Shubina | Uzbekistan | 1:58.317 | QS |
| 5 | Pauliina Polet | Finland | 1:59.083 | QS |
| 6 | Lee Sun-ja | South Korea | 2:00.161 | QS |
| 7 | Franziska Widmer | Switzerland | 2:00.922 | qS |
| 8 | Hilal Avci | Turkey | 2:03.917 | |

==== Heat 2 ====
| Rank | Kayaker | Country | Time | Notes |
|---|---|---|---|---|
| 1 | Elena Aniushina | Russia | 1:55.250 | QS |
| 2 | Emma Jørgensen | Denmark | 1:55.644 | QS |
| 3 | Erika Medveczky | Hungary | 1:55.822 | QS |
| 4 | Begoña Lazkano | Spain | 1:56.444 | QS |
| 5 | Jennifer Egan | Ireland | 1:58.439 | QS |
| 6 | Nataliia Dokiienko | Ukraine | 1:58.889 | QS |
| 7 | Arezoo Hakimi | Iran | 1:59.566 | qS |
| 8 | Madara Aldina | Latvia | 2:02.044 | |
| 9 | Nina Riosa | Estonia | 2:09.544 | |

==== Heat 3 ====
| Rank | Kayaker | Country | Time | Notes |
|---|---|---|---|---|
| 1 | Ivana Mládková | Slovakia | 1:55.117 | QS |
| 2 | Teresa Portela | Portugal | 1:55.617 | QS |
| 3 | María Magdalena Garro | Argentina | 1:56.462 | QS |
| 4 | Esti van Tonder | South Africa | 1:56.712 | QS |
| 5 | Michelle Russell | Canada | 1:57.762 | QS |
| 6 | Sofia Campana | Italy | 1:58.028 | QS |
| 7 | Karolina Markiewicz | Poland | 1:59.806 | qS |
| 8 | Stevani Maysche Ibo | Indonesia | 2:03.034 | |
| 9 | Kaitlyn McElroy | United States | 2:06.528 | |

==== Heat 4 ====
| Rank | Kayaker | Country | Time | Notes |
|---|---|---|---|---|
| 1 | Volha Khudzenka | Belarus | 1:51.675 | QS |
| 2 | Sabrina Hering | Germany | 1:54.870 | QS |
| 3 | Linnea Stensils | Sweden | 1:55.286 | QS |
| 4 | Rebeka Simon | Great Britain | 1:56.564 | QS |
| 5 | Léa Jamelot | France | 1:58.092 | QS |
| 6 | Sofie Kinclová | Czech Republic | 2:01.236 | QS |
| 7 | Inna Klinova | Kazakhstan | 2:03.925 | |
| 8 | Soh Sze Ying | Singapore | 2:07.692 | |

=== Semifinals ===
Qualification in each semi was as follows:

The fastest three boats advanced to the A final.
The next three fastest boats advanced to the B final.

==== Semifinal 1 ====
| Rank | Kayaker | Country | Time | Notes |
|---|---|---|---|---|
| 1 | Emma Jørgensen | Denmark | 1:53.969 | QA |
| 2 | Milica Starović | Serbia | 1:54.236 | QA |
| 3 | Teresa Portela | Portugal | 1:54.925 | QA |
| 4 | Linnea Stensils | Sweden | 1:56.519 | QB |
| 5 | Rebeka Simon | Great Britain | 1:56.625 | QB |
| 6 | Michelle Russell | Canada | 1:57.147 | QB |
| 7 | Nataliia Dokiienko | Ukraine | 2:00.363 | |
| 8 | Pauliina Polet | Finland | 2:00.758 | |
| 9 | Arezoo Hakimi | Iran | 2:03.991 | |

==== Semifinal 2 ====
| Rank | Kayaker | Country | Time | Notes |
|---|---|---|---|---|
| 1 | Elena Aniushina | Russia | 1:54.892 | QA |
| 2 | Sabrina Hering | Germany | 1:55.414 | QA |
| 3 | Jo Brigden-Jones | Australia | 1:56.520 | QA |
| 4 | María Magdalena Garro | Argentina | 1:57.959 | QB |
| 5 | Esti van Tonder | South Africa | 1:58.131 | QB |
| 6 | Ekaterina Shubina | Uzbekistan | 1:59.575 | QB |
| 7 | Karolina Markiewicz | Poland | 2:01.242 | |
| 8 | Jennifer Egan | Ireland | 2:01.859 | |
| 9 | Sofie Kinclová | Czech Republic | 2:02.470 | |

==== Semifinal 3 ====
| Rank | Kayaker | Country | Time | Notes |
|---|---|---|---|---|
| 1 | Volha Khudzenka | Belarus | 1:52.015 | QA |
| 2 | Lisa Carrington | New Zealand | 1:53.742 | QA |
| 3 | Ivana Mládková | Slovakia | 1:55.731 | QA |
| 4 | Erika Medveczky | Hungary | 1:56.459 | QB |
| 5 | Begoña Lazkano | Spain | 1:57.237 | QB |
| 6 | Sofia Campana | Italy | 1:58.920 | QB |
| 7 | Franziska Widmer | Switzerland | 2:00.931 | |
| 8 | Lee Sun-ja | South Korea | 2:02.076 | |
| – | Léa Jamelot | France | DSQ (Note: Léa Jamelot was disqualified for violating ICF rule 27.2) | |

=== Finals ===
==== Final B ====
Competitors in this final raced for positions 10 to 18.

| Rank | Kayaker | Country | Time |
|---|---|---|---|
| 1 | Linnea Stensils | Sweden | 1:54.068 |
| 2 | Michelle Russell | Canada | 1:56.001 |
| 3 | Erika Medveczky | Hungary | 1:56.190 |
| 4 | Rebeka Simon | Great Britain | 1:56.324 |
| 5 | Esti van Tonder | South Africa | 1:56.935 |
| 6 | María Magdalena Garro | Argentina | 1:57.046 |
| 7 | Ekaterina Shubina | Uzbekistan | 1:57.946 |
| 8 | Sofia Campana | Italy | 1:58.707 |
| 9 | Begoña Lazkano | Spain | 2:01.957 |

==== Final A ====
Competitors in this final raced for positions 1 to 9, with medals going to the top three.

| Rank | Kayaker | Country | Time |
|---|---|---|---|
| 1st place, gold medalist(s) | Volha Khudzenka | Belarus | 1:48.421 |
| 2nd place, silver medalist(s) | Lisa Carrington | New Zealand | 1:48.710 |
| 3rd place, bronze medalist(s) | Emma Jørgensen | Denmark | 1:50.465 |
| 4 | Sabrina Hering | Germany | 1:51.527 |
| 5 | Elena Aniushina | Russia | 1:51.710 |
| 6 | Milica Starović | Serbia | 1:52.221 |
| 7 | Teresa Portela | Portugal | 1:52.254 |
| 8 | Ivana Mládková | Slovakia | 1:53.193 |
| 9 | Jo Brigden-Jones | Australia | 1:54.154 |
