= 2023 ICF Canoe Sprint World Championships – Women's K-1 500 metres =

Women's K-1 500 metres at the 2023 ICF Canoe Sprint World Championships
- Venue: Sportpark Duisburg
- Location: Duisburg, Germany
- Dates: 23-26 August
- Competitors: 47 from 47 nations
- Winning time: 1:47.769

Medalists
gold medal	Lisa Carrington	New Zealand
silver medal	Emma Jørgensen	Denmark
bronze medal	Tamara Csipes	Hungary

The women's K-1 500 metres competition at the 2023 ICF Canoe Sprint World Championships in Duisburg took place in Sportpark Duisburg.

== Schedule ==
The schedule is as follows:

Date	Time	Round
Wednesday 23 August 2023	14:59	Heats
Thursday 24 August 2023	14:38	Semi-Final A
Thursday 24 August 2023	14:56	Semi-Final B
Saturday 26 August 2023	09:16	Final E
Saturday 26 August 2023	09:22	Final D
Saturday 26 August 2023	09:28	Final C
Saturday 26 August 2023	09:34	Final B
Saturday 26 August 2023	12:21	Final A

== Results ==
=== Heats ===
The four fastest boats in each heat and three fastest 5th ranked boats advanced to the semi final A.
Rest boats advanced to the semi final B.

==== Heat 1 ====
Rank	Canoeist	Country	Time	Notes
1	Emma Jørgensen	Denmark	1:52.017	QSA
2	Isabel Contreras	Spain	1:52.445	QSA
3	Agata Fantini	Italy	1:53.758	QSA
4	Elise Erland	Norway	2:01.192	QSA
5	Daniela Castillo	Chile	2:06.667	QSB
6	Aya Ferfad	Algeria	2:13.423	QSB
7	Samaa Ahmed	Egypt	2:13.857	QSB
	Yocelin Canache	Venezuela	DNS	

==== Heat 2 ====
Rank	Canoeist	Country	Time	Notes
1	Teresa Portela	Portugal	1:52.122	QSA
2	Anamaria Govorčinović	Croatia	1:53.403	QSA
3	Katarzyna Kołodziejczyk	Poland	1:55.007	QSA
4	Darya Budouskaya	Israel	1:58.541	QSA
5	Elizaveta Fedorova	Estonia	2:01.847	QSB
6	Soniya Devi Phairembam	India	2:08.370	QSB
7	Carmen Morawietz	Romania	2:12.325	QSB

==== Heat 3 ====
Rank	Canoeist	Country	Time	Notes
1	Alyce Wood	Australia	1:51.275	QSA
2	Milica Novaković	Serbia	1:52.606	QSA
3	Esti Olivier	South Africa	1:53.505	QSA
4	Manon Hostens	France	1:54.906	QSA
5	Franziska Widmer	Switzerland	1:55.997	QSA
6	Kitty Schiphorst Preuper	Netherlands	1:59.256	QSB
7	Kotryna Glemžaitė	Lithuania	1:59.624	QSB
8	Mónica Hincapié	Colombia	2:05.940	QSB

==== Heat 4 ====
Rank	Canoeist	Country	Time	Notes
1	Tamara Csipes	Hungary	1:51.425	QSA
2	Michelle Russell	Canada	1:53.555	QSA
3	Anežka Paloudová	Czech Republic	1:54.484	QSA
4	Brenda Rojas	Argentina	1:54.891	QSA
5	Špela Ponomarenko Janić	Slovenia	1:55.421	QSA
6	Ana Paula Vergutz	Brazil	1:59.008	QSB
7	Kali Wilding	United States	2:02.801	QSB
8	Stefanie Perdomo	Ecuador	2:04.733	QSB

==== Heat 5 ====
Rank	Canoeist	Country	Time	Notes
1	Lisa Carrington	New Zealand	1:52.972	QSA
2	Pauline Jagsch	Germany	1:54.087	QSA
3	Li Dongyin	China	1:57.766	QSA
4	Snizhana Stalinova	Ukraine	1:59.470	QSA
5	Lucy Lee-Smith	United Kingdom	2:00.075	QSA
6	Netta Malinen	Finland	2:00.379	QSB
7	Darya Petrova	Kazakhstan	2:03.305	QSB
	Raina Taitingfong	Guam	DNF	

==== Heat 6 ====
Rank	Canoeist	Country	Time	Notes
1	Melina Andersson	Sweden	1:57.217	QSA
2	Yoana Georgieva	Bulgaria	1:57.374	QSA
3	Hediyeh Kazemi	Iran	2:01.669	QSA
4	Hilal Avcı	Turkey	2:01.804	QSA
5	Madara Aldiņa	Latvia	2:01.842	QSB
6	Soh Sze Ying	Singapore	2:05.823	QSB
7	Chung Hoi Tik	Hong Kong	2:21.134	QSB
8	Carolina Daibert Moncorvo	Honduras	2:22.998	QSB

=== Semifinals ===
==== Semi Final B ====
The fastest three boats in each semi final B advanced to the D final.
The 4th-6th placed boats in each semi final B advanced to the E final.

===== Semi Final B 1 =====
Rank	Canoeist	Country	Time	Notes
1	Netta Malinen	Finland	1:55.166	QD
2	Kotryna Glemžaitė	Lithuania	1:56.681	QD
3	Stefanie Perdomo	Ecuador	2:00.027	QD
4	Daniela Castillo	Chile	2:01.766	QE
5	Carolina Daibert Moncorvo	Honduras	2:09.182	QE
	Soniya Devi Phairembam	India	DNS	

===== Semi Final B 2 =====
Rank	Canoeist	Country	Time	Notes
1	Ana Paula Vergutz	Brazil	1:54.356	QD
2	Madara Aldiņa	Latvia	1:54.840	QD
3	Darya Petrova	Kazakhstan	1:56.820	QD
4	Mónica Hincapié	Colombia	2:01.176	QE
5	Aya Ferfad	Algeria	2:07.721	QE
6	Carmen Morawietz	Romania	2:07.912	QE
7	Chung Hoi Tik	Hong Kong	2:13.446	

===== Semi Final B 3 =====
Rank	Canoeist	Country	Time	Notes
1	Kali Wilding	United States	1:55.113	QD
2	Kitty Schiphorst Preuper	Netherlands	1:55.952	QD
3	Elizaveta Fedorova	Estonia	1:58.672	QD
4	Soh Sze Ying	Singapore	1:59.767	QE
5	Samaa Ahmed	Egypt	2:11.869	QE

==== Semi Final A ====
The fastest three boats in each semi final A advanced to the A final.
The 4th - 6th boats in each semi final A advanced to the B final.
Remaining boats advanced to the C final.

===== Semi Final A 1 =====
Rank	Canoeist	Country	Time	Notes
1	Lisa Carrington	New Zealand	1:47.216	QA
2	Teresa Portela	Portugal	1:48.777	QA
3	Milica Novaković	Serbia	1:49.431	QA
4	Agata Fantini	Italy	1:50.419	QB
5	Anežka Paloudová	Czech Republic	1:51.242	QB
6	Hediyeh Kazemi	Iran	1:53.501	QB
7	Snizhana Stalinova	Ukraine	1:53.701	QC
8	Darya Budouskaya	Israel	1:55.624	QC
9	Lucy Lee-Smith	United Kingdom	1:55.819	QC

===== Semi Final A 2 =====
Rank	Canoeist	Country	Time	Notes
1	Tamara Csipes	Hungary	1:46.862	QA
2	Emma Jørgensen	Denmark	1:47.608	QA
3	Pauline Jagsch	Germany	1:48.849	QA
4	Yoana Georgieva	Bulgaria	1:49.138	QB
5	Anamaria Govorčinović	Croatia	1:49.241	QB
6	Esti Olivier	South Africa	1:50.597	QB
7	Brenda Rojas	Argentina	1:50.865	QC
8	Špela Ponomarenko Janić	Slovenia	1:51.999	QC
9	Elise Erland	Norway	2:02.847	QC

===== Semi Final A 3 =====
Rank	Canoeist	Country	Time	Notes
1	Alyce Wood	Australia	1:48.085	QA
2	Michelle Russell	Canada	1:48.538	QA
3	Melina Andersson	Sweden	1:49.464	QA
4	Isabel Contreras	Spain	1:49.490	QB
5	Katarzyna Kołodziejczyk	Poland	1:51.219	QB
6	Manon Hostens	France	1:51.450	QB
7	Li Dongyin	China	1:52.974	QC
8	Franziska Widmer	Switzerland	1:54.025	QC
9	Hilal Avcı	Turkey	1:54.235	QC

=== Finals ===
==== Final E ====
Competitors in this final raced for positions 37 to 43.

Rank	Canoeist	Country	Time	Notes
1	Soh Sze Ying	Singapore	1:59.741	
2	Daniela Castillo	Chile	2:01.279	
3	Mónica Hincapié	Colombia	2:01.842	
4	Aya Ferfad	Algeria	2:05.714	
5	Carmen Morawietz	Romania	2:08.664	
6	Samaa Ahmed	Egypt	2:09.380	
7	Carolina Daibert Moncorvo	Honduras	2:10.545	

==== Final D ====
Competitors in this final raced for positions 28 to 36.

Rank	Canoeist	Country	Time	Notes
1	Madara Aldiņa	Latvia	1:54.968	
2	Ana Paula Vergutz	Brazil	1:55.730	
3	Netta Malinen	Finland	1:56.423	
4	Kotryna Glemžaitė	Lithuania	1:57.055	
5	Kitty Schiphorst Preuper	Netherlands	1:57.550	
6	Kali Wilding	United States	1:57.712	
7	Stefanie Perdomo	Ecuador	1:59.224	
8	Elizaveta Fedorova	Estonia	2:00.546	
9	Darya Petrova	Kazakhstan	2:02.039	

==== Final C ====
Competitors in this final raced for positions 19 to 27.

Rank	Canoeist	Country	Time	Notes
1	Brenda Rojas	Argentina	1:53.221	
2	Li Dongyin	China	1:53.970	
3	Franziska Widmer	Switzerland	1:54.407	
4	Lucy Lee-Smith	United Kingdom	1:56.235	
5	Snizhana Stalinova	Ukraine	1:56.406	
6	Hilal Avcı	Turkey	1:56.775	
7	Darya Budouskaya	Israel	1:56.847	
8	Špela Ponomarenko Janić	Slovenia	1:58.175	
9	Elise Erland	Norway	1:59.764	

==== Final B ====
Competitors in this final raced for positions 9 to 18.

Rank	Canoeist	Country	Time	Notes
1	Anamaria Govorčinović	Croatia	1:49.673	
2	Yoana Georgieva	Bulgaria	1:50.247	
3	Isabel Contreras	Spain	1:50.416	
4	Esti Olivier	South Africa	1:51.085	
5	Agata Fantini	Italy	1:51.547	
6	Katarzyna Kołodziejczyk	Poland	1:51.585	
7	Anežka Paloudová	Czech Republic	1:51.844	
8	Manon Hostens	France	1:53.851	
9	Hediyeh Kazemi	Iran	1:57.458	

==== Final A ====
Competitors in this final raced for positions 1 to 9.

Rank	Canoeist	Country	Time	Notes
1st place, gold medalist(s)	Lisa Carrington	New Zealand	1:47.769	
2nd place, silver medalist(s)	Emma Jørgensen	Denmark	1:49.102	
3rd place, bronze medalist(s)	Tamara Csipes	Hungary	1:50.699	
4	Milica Novaković	Serbia	1:51.328	
5	Alyce Wood	Australia	1:51.391	
6	Michelle Russell	Canada	1:51.562	
7	Pauline Jagsch	Germany	1:52.254	
8	Teresa Portela	Portugal	1:52.436	
9	Melina Andersson	Sweden	1:53.330	
