= 2017 ICF Canoe Sprint World Championships – Women's K-1 200 metres =

Women's K-1 200 metres at the 2017 ICF Canoe Sprint World Championships
- Venue: Sportcentrum Račice
- Location: Račice, Czech Republic
- Dates: 25–27 August
- Competitors: 35 from 35 nations
- Winning time: 38.433

Medalists
gold medal	Lisa Carrington	New Zealand
silver medal	Emma Jørgensen	Denmark
bronze medal	Špela Ponomarenko Janić	Slovenia
bronze medal	Milica Starović	Serbia

The women's K-1 200 metres competition at the 2017 ICF Canoe Sprint World Championships in Račice took place at the Sportcentrum Račice.

== Schedule ==
The schedule was as follows:

Date	Time	Round
Friday 25 August 2017	09:38	Heats
Saturday 26 August 2017	15:44	Semifinals
Sunday 27 August 2017	08:56	Final B
Sunday 27 August 2017	10:46	Final A

All times are Central European Summer Time (UTC+2)

== Results ==
=== Heats ===
The six fastest boats in each heat, plus the three fastest remaining boats advanced to the semifinals.

==== Heat 1 ====
Rank	Kayaker	Country	Time	Notes
1	Lisa Carrington	New Zealand	40.222	QS
2	Dóra Lucz	Hungary	41.077	QS
3	Jessica Walker	Great Britain	41.766	QS
4	Arezoo Hakimi	Iran	42.750	QS
5	Stephenie Chen Jiexian	Singapore	43.305	QS
6	Kaitlyn McElroy	United States	45.172	QS
7	Masripah Masripah	Indonesia	46.877	
8	Sandhya Kispotta	India	49.950	

==== Heat 2 ====
Rank	Kayaker	Country	Time	Notes
1	Marta Walczykiewicz	Poland	40.652	QS
2	Milica Starović	Serbia	40.974	QS
3	Jo Brigden-Jones	Australia	41.979	QS
4	Ekaterina Shubina	Uzbekistan	42.163	QS
5	Inna Klinova	Kazakhstan	42.374	QS
6	Katya Aleksievich	Belarus	43.068	QS
7	Sofia Campana	Italy	43.157	
8	Madara Aldina	Latvia	44.463	
9	Agostina Cappelletti	Argentina	50.513	

==== Heat 3 ====
Rank	Kayaker	Country	Time	Notes
1	Špela Ponomarenko Janić	Slovenia	40.300	QS
2	Teresa Portela	Spain	40.350	QS
3	Emma Jørgensen	Denmark	40.483	QS
4	Sarah Guyot	France	40.567	QS
5	Liudmyla Kuklinovska	Ukraine	41.139	QS
6	Esti van Tonder	South Africa	41.772	QS
7	Jennifer Egan	Ireland	42.028	qS
8	Lasma Liepa	Turkey	42.289	qS
9	Kim Guk-joo	South Korea	42.305	qS

==== Heat 4 ====
Rank	Kayaker	Country	Time	Notes
1	Linnea Stensils	Sweden	40.403	QS
2	Ivana Mládková	Slovakia	40.553	QS
3	Elena Aniushina	Russia	40.603	QS
4	Andréanne Langlois	Canada	40.642	QS
5	Teresa Portela	Portugal	40.759	QS
6	Maria Lorena Manolica	Azerbaijan	41.720	QS
7	Kateřina Slivanská	Czech Republic	42.692	
8	Katharina Köther	Germany	42.731	
9	Maoli Angulo	Ecuador	43.936	

=== Semifinals ===
Qualification in each semi was as follows:

The fastest three boats advanced to the A final.
The next three fastest boats advanced to the B final.

==== Semifinal 1 ====
Rank	Kayaker	Country	Time	Notes
1	Lisa Carrington	New Zealand	39.557	QA
2	Elena Aniushina	Russia	40.285	QA
3	Milica Starović	Serbia	40.296	QA
4	Teresa Portela	Spain	40.513	QB
5	Andréanne Langlois	Canada	40.929	QB
6	Liudmyla Kuklinovska	Ukraine	41.268	QB
7	Katya Aleksievich	Belarus	42.157	
8	Jennifer Egan	Ireland	42.701	
9	Stephenie Chen Jiexian	Singapore	43.451	

==== Semifinal 2 ====
Rank	Kayaker	Country	Time	Notes
1	Emma Jørgensen	Denmark	40.213	QA
2	Marta Walczykiewicz	Poland	40.385	QA
3	Ivana Mládková	Slovakia	40.535	QA
4	Sarah Guyot	France	40.746	QB
5	Jessica Walker	Great Britain	41.296	QB
6	Inna Klinova	Kazakhstan	41.746	QB
7	Lasma Liepa	Turkey	41.919	
8	Maria Lorena Manolica	Azerbaijan	42.074	
9	Arezoo Hakimi	Iran	42.335	

==== Semifinal 3 ====
Rank	Kayaker	Country	Time	Notes
1	Dóra Lucz	Hungary	40.325	QA
2	Špela Ponomarenko Janić	Slovenia	40.553	QA
3	Teresa Portela	Portugal	40.653	QA
4	Linnea Stensils	Sweden	41.125	QB
5	Jo Brigden-Jones	Australia	42.119	QB
6	Esti van Tonder	South Africa	42.347	QB
7	Ekaterina Shubina	Uzbekistan	42.369	
8	Kim Guk-joo	South Korea	43.208	
9	Kaitlyn McElroy	United States	45.042	

=== Finals ===
==== Final B ====
Competitors in this final raced for positions 10 to 18.

Rank	Kayaker	Country	Time
1	Teresa Portela	Spain	40.425
2	Linnea Stensils	Sweden	40.475
3	Andréanne Langlois	Canada	40.975
4	Liudmyla Kuklinovska	Ukraine	41.153
5	Sarah Guyot	France	41.169
6	Jessica Walker	Great Britain	41.180
7	Inna Klinova	Kazakhstan	41.664
8	Jo Brigden-Jones	Australia	41.969
9	Esti van Tonder	South Africa	42.514

==== Final A ====
Competitors in this final raced for positions 1 to 9, with medals going to the top four as two boats were tied for third place.

Rank	Kayaker	Country	Time
1st place, gold medalist(s)	Lisa Carrington	New Zealand	38.433
2nd place, silver medalist(s)	Emma Jørgensen	Denmark	38.996
3rd place, bronze medalist(s)	Špela Ponomarenko Janić	Slovenia	39.564
3rd place, bronze medalist(s)	Milica Starović	Serbia	39.564
5	Elena Aniushina	Russia	39.596
5	Marta Walczykiewicz	Poland	39.596
7	Ivana Mládková	Slovakia	39.785
8	Dóra Lucz	Hungary	39.801
9	Teresa Portela	Portugal	40.006
