= 2021 ICF Canoe Sprint World Championships – Women's K-1 200 metres =

Women's K-1 200 metres at the 2021 ICF Canoe Sprint World Championships
- Venue: Lake Bagsværd
- Location: Copenhagen, Denmark
- Dates: 16–18 September
- Competitors: 18 from 18 nations
- Winning time: 39.98

Medalists
gold medal	Emma Jørgensen	Denmark
silver medal	Anna Lucz	Hungary
bronze medal	Natalia Podolskaya	International Olympic Committee

The women's K-1 200 metres competition at the 2021 ICF Canoe Sprint World Championships in Copenhagen took place on Lake Bagsværd.

== Schedule ==
The schedule was as follows:

Date	Time	Round
Thursday 16 September 2021	11:55	Heats
Friday 17 September 2021	14:00	Semifinal
Saturday 18 September 2021	11:57	Final

All times are Central European Summer Time (UTC+2)

== Results ==
=== Heats ===
The fastest three boats in each heat advanced directly to the final.
The next four fastest boats in each heat, plus the fastest remaining boat advanced to the semifinal.

==== Heat 1 ====
Rank	Kayaker	Country	Time	Notes
1	Emma Jørgensen	Denmark	41.84	QF
2	Natalia Podolskaya	RCF	42.27	QF
3	Milica Novaković	Serbia	42.72	QF
4	Francesca Genzo	Italy	42.74	QS
5	Vanina Paoletti	France	43.02	QS
6	Emily Lewis	Great Britain	43.78	QS
7	Natalie Davison	Canada	43.82	QS
8	Mariia Kichasova-Skoryk	Ukraine	44.05	qS
9	Mirella Vázquez	Spain	44.07	

==== Heat 2 ====
Rank	Kayaker	Country	Time	Notes
1	Anna Lucz	Hungary	43.05	QF
2	Marta Walczykiewicz	Poland	43.27	QF
3	Linnea Stensils	Sweden	43.70	QF
4	Teresa Portela	Portugal	44.16	QS
5	Olimpiya Dusheva	Bulgaria	44.22	QS
6	Madara Aldiņa	Latvia	45.75	QS
7	Chen Jiexian	Singapore	45.87	QS
8	Esti Olivier	South Africa	46.82	
9	Anna Mus	Netherlands	48.31	

=== Semifinal ===
The fastest three boats advanced to the final.

Rank	Kayaker	Country	Time	Notes
1	Teresa Portela	Portugal	41.05	QF
2	Francesca Genzo	Italy	41.10	QF
3	Vanina Paoletti	France	41.19	QF
4	Mariia Kichasova-Skoryk	Ukraine	41.34	
5	Emily Lewis	Great Britain	41.37	
6	Olimpiya Dusheva	Bulgaria	41.42	
7	Natalie Davison	Canada	42.20	
8	Madara Aldiņa	Latvia	42.64	
9	Chen Jiexian	Singapore	43.98	

=== Final ===
Competitors raced for positions 1 to 9, with medals going to the top three.

Rank	Kayaker	Country	Time
1st place, gold medalist(s)	Emma Jørgensen	Denmark	39.98
2nd place, silver medalist(s)	Anna Lucz	Hungary	40.71
3rd place, bronze medalist(s)	Natalia Podolskaya	RCF	40.79
4	Marta Walczykiewicz	Poland	40.80
5	Teresa Portela	Portugal	41.02
6	Linnea Stensils	Sweden	41.08
7	Francesca Genzo	Italy	41.31
8	Milica Novaković	Serbia	41.43
9	Vanina Paoletti	France	41.96
