= 2023 ICF Canoe Sprint World Championships – Women's K-1 200 metres =

Women's K-1 200 metres at the 2023 ICF Canoe Sprint World Championships
- Venue: Sportpark Duisburg
- Location: Duisburg, Germany
- Dates: 24–27 August
- Competitors: 33 from 33 nations
- Winning time: 38.932

Medalists
gold medal	Lisa Carrington	New Zealand
silver medal	Yale Steinepreis	Australia
bronze medal	Dominika Putto	Poland

The women's K-1 200 metres competition at the 2023 ICF Canoe Sprint World Championships in Duisburg took place in Sportpark Duisburg.

== Schedule ==
The schedule is as follows:

Date	Time	Round
Thursday 24 August 2023	09:00	Heats
Saturday 26 August 2023	15:00	Semifinals
Sunday 27 August 2023	10:12	Final B
Sunday 27 August 2023	11:28	Final A

== Results ==
=== Heats ===
The fastest six boats in each heat, plus the fastest three remaining boats, advanced to the semifinal.

==== Heat 1 ====
Rank	Canoeist	Country	Time	Notes
1	Yin Mengdie	China	41.477	QS
2	Špela Ponomarenko Janić	Slovenia	41.618	QS
3	Teresa Tirado	Spain	42.164	QS
4	Hediyeh Kazemi	Iran	42.614	QS
5	Caroline Arft	Germany	43.032	QS
6	Inna Klinova	Ukraine	43.297	QS
7	Kotryna Glemžaitė	Lithuania	43.755	qS
8	Ysumy Orellana	Chile	45.701	
9	Emma McDonald	United States	46.837	

==== Heat 2 ====
Rank	Canoeist	Country	Time	Notes
1	Dominika Putto	Poland	40.861	QS
2	Toshka Besharah	Canada	41.067	QS
3	Anna Lucz	Hungary	41.242	QS
4	Sara del Gratta	Italy	42.976	QS
5	Lucy Lee-Smith	Great Britain	43.075	QS
6	Štěpánka Sobíšková	Czech Republic	43.252	QS
7	Soh Sze Ying	Singapore	43.584	qS
8	Stefanie Perdomo	Ecuador	43.899	
9	Franziska Widmer	Switzerland	44.037	

==== Heat 3 ====
Rank	Canoeist	Country	Time	Notes
1	Yoana Georgieva	Bulgaria	42.261	QS
2	Madara Aldiņa	Latvia	43.196	QS
3	Tatyana Tokarnitskaya	Kazakhstan	43.328	QS
4	Réka Bugár	Slovakia	43.644	QS
5	Soniya Devi Phairembam	India	47.864	QS
6	Chung Hoi Tik	Hong Kong	50.330	QS
7	Carolina Daibert Moncorvo	Honduras	51.721	
8	Raina Taitingfong	Guam	56.235	

==== Heat 4 ====
Rank	Canoeist	Country	Time	Notes
1	Yale Steinepreis	Australia	40.480	QS
2	Lisa Carrington	New Zealand	40.903	QS
3	Esti Olivier	South Africa	41.571	QS
4	Anamaria Govorčinović	Croatia	43.109	QS
5	Hilal Avcı	Turkey	43.749	QS
6	Anfel Arabi	Algeria	46.209	QS
7	Angie Rodríguez	Colombia	47.087	qS
	Yocelin Canache	Venezuela	DNS	

=== Semifinal ===
The fastest three boats in each semi advanced to the A final. The next three fastest boats in each semi advanced to the final B.

==== Semifinal 1 ====
Rank	Canoeist	Country	Time	Notes
1	Toshka Besharah	Canada	40.246	QA
2	Yin Mengdie	China	40.510	QA
3	Esti Olivier	South Africa	40.513	QA
4	Anamaria Govorčinović	Croatia	41.270	QB
5	Štěpánka Sobíšková	Czech Republic	41.602	QB
6	Madara Aldiņa	Latvia	42.031	QB
7	Caroline Arft	Germany	42.086	
8	Soh Sze Ying	Singapore	43.169	
9	Soniya Devi Phairembam	India	47.756	

==== Semifinal 2 ====
Rank	Canoeist	Country	Time	Notes
1	Lisa Carrington	New Zealand	38.898	QA
2	Dominika Putto	Poland	40.012	QA
3	Hediyeh Kazemi	Iran	41.217	QA
4	Teresa Tirado	Spain	41.264	QB
5	Tatyana Tokarnitskaya	Kazakhstan	41.914	QB
6	Réka Bugár	Slovakia	42.007	QB
7	Lucy Lee-Smith	Great Britain	42.091	
8	Kotryna Glemžaitė	Lithuania	43.831	
9	Anfel Arabi	Algeria	46.272	

==== Semifinal 3 ====
Rank	Canoeist	Country	Time	Notes
1	Yale Steinepreis	Australia	39.433	QA
2	Špela Ponomarenko Janić	Slovenia	40.570	QA
3	Yoana Georgieva	Bulgaria	40.675	QA
4	Anna Lucz	Hungary	40.844	QB
5	Inna Klinova	Ukraine	41.394	QB
6	Sara del Gratta	Italy	42.469	QB
7	Hilal Avcı	Turkey	42.857	
8	Angie Rodríguez	Colombia	45.869	
9	Chung Hoi Tik	Hong Kong	49.928	

=== Final B ===
Competitors in this final raced for positions 10 to 18.

Rank	Canoeist	Country	Time
1	Anna Lucz	Hungary	40.726
2	Anamaria Govorčinović	Croatia	41.246
3	Teresa Tirado	Spain	42.001
4	Inna Klinova	Ukraine	42.067
5	Madara Aldiņa	Latvia	42.252
6	Štěpánka Sobíšková	Czech Republic	42.303
7	Réka Bugár	Slovakia	42.368
8	Tatyana Tokarnitskaya	Kazakhstan	42.647
9	Sara del Gratta	Italy	42.777

=== Final A ===
Competitors raced for positions 1 to 9, with medals going to the top three.

Rank	Canoeist	Country	Time
1st place, gold medalist(s)	Lisa Carrington	New Zealand	38.932
2nd place, silver medalist(s)	Yale Steinepreis	Australia	40.010
3rd place, bronze medalist(s)	Dominika Putto	Poland	40.367
4	Toshka Besharah	Canada	40.561
5	Yin Mengdie	China	40.654
6	Esti Olivier	South Africa	40.868
7	Yoana Georgieva	Bulgaria	41.114
8	Špela Ponomarenko Janić	Slovenia	41.549
9	Hediyeh Kazemi	Iran	42.398
