= Canoe sprint at the 2023 European Games – Mixed K-2 200 metres =

Mixed K-2 200 metres at the 2023 European Games
- Venue: Kryspinów Waterway
- Date: 22–24 June
- Competitors: 40 from 20 nations
- Teams: 20
- Winning time: 34.260

Medalists
gold medal	Kevin Santos; Teresa Portela	Portugal
silver medal	Magnus Sibbersen; Emma Jørgensen	Denmark
bronze medal	Jacob Schopf; Lena Röhlings	Germany

The mixed K-2 200 metres canoe sprint competition at the 2023 European Games took place from 22 to 24 June at the Kryspinów Waterway.

== Schedule ==
All times are local (UTC+2).

Date	Time	Round
Thursday, 22 June 2023	17:31	Heats
Friday, 23 June 2023	17:54	Semifinal
Saturday, 24 June 2023	14:35	Final B
Saturday, 24 June 2023	14:44	Final A

== Results ==
=== Heats ===
==== Heat 1 ====
Rank	Kayakers	Country	Time	Notes
1	Teresa Portela; Kevin Santos	Portugal	34.395	QA, GB
2	Anna Lucz; Bence Vajda	Hungary	35.381	QS
3	Melānija Čamane; Kārlis Dumpis	Latvia	35.457	QS
4	Carlos Garrote; Isabel Contreras	Spain	35.745	QS
5	Marija Dostanić; Bojan Zdelar	Serbia	36.149	QS
6	Ana Roxana Lehaci; Timon Maurer	Austria	36.357	QS
7	Emircan Ayaklı; Hilal Avcı	Turkey	37.097	QS

==== Heat 2 ====
Rank	Kayakers	Country	Time	Notes
1	Nataliia Dokiienko; Oleksandr Zaitsev	Ukraine	35.074	QA
2	Magnus Ivarsen; Kristine Amundsen	Norway	35.886	QS
3	Denis Myšák; Bianka Sidová	Slovakia	36.332	QS
4	Aleksandra Mihalashvili; Veselin Valchov	Bulgaria	37.216	QS
5	Netta Malkinson; Stav Mizrahi	Israel	37.500	QS
6	Capucine Dubut; Steven Henry	France	37.638	QS
7	Darius Zaharia; Camelia Mincă	Romania	40.204	QS

==== Heat 3 ====
Rank	Kayakers	Country	Time	Notes
1	Katarzyna Kołodziejczyk; Jakub Stepun	Poland	34.949	QA
2	Emma Jørgensen; Magnus Sibbersen	Denmark	34.979	QS
3	Lena Röhlings; Jacob Schopf	Germany	35.075	QS
4	Anže Urankar; Špela Ponomarenko Janić	Slovenia	35.257	QS
5	Cristina Petracca; Alessandro Gnecchi	Italy	35.541	QS
6	Theodor Orban; Julia Lagerstam	Sweden	36.029	QS

=== Semifinals ===
==== Semifinal 1 ====
Rank	Kayakers	Country	Time	Notes
1	Lena Röhlings; Jacob Schopf	Germany	34.194	QA, GB
2	Carlos Garrote; Isabel Contreras	Spain	34.464	QA
3	Anna Lucz; Bence Vajda	Hungary	34.568	QA
4	Anže Urankar; Špela Ponomarenko Janić	Slovenia	34.604	QB
5	Theodor Orban; Julia Lagerstam	Sweden	34.804	QB
6	Denis Myšák; Bianka Sidová	Slovakia	35.158	QB
7	Ana Roxana Lehaci; Timon Maurer	Austria	35.492	QB
8	Netta Malkinson; Stav Mizrahi	Israel	36.098	qB
9	Darius Zaharia; Camelia Mincă	Romania	41.402	

==== Semifinal 2 ====
Rank	Kayakers	Country	Time	Notes
1	Emma Jørgensen; Magnus Sibbersen	Denmark	35.163	QA
2	Melānija Čamane; Kārlis Dumpis	Latvia	35.427	QA
3	Cristina Petracca; Alessandro Gnecchi	Italy	35.567	QA
4	Marija Dostanić; Bojan Zdelar	Serbia	35.659	QB
5	Magnus Ivarsen; Kristine Amundsen	Norway	35.851	QB
6	Capucine Dubut; Steven Henry	France	36.907	QB
7	Emircan Ayaklı; Hilal Avcı	Turkey	37.003	QB
8	Aleksandra Mihalashvili; Veselin Valchov	Bulgaria	37.103	

=== Finals ===
==== Final B ====
Rank	Kayakers	Country	Time
10	Anže Urankar; Špela Ponomarenko Janić	Slovenia	35.360
11	Theodor Orban; Julia Lagerstam	Sweden	35.388
12	Denis Myšák; Bianka Sidová	Slovakia	35.536
13	Magnus Ivarsen; Kristine Amundsen	Norway	35.844
14	Marija Dostanić; Bojan Zdelar	Serbia	35.956
15	Ana Roxana Lehaci; Timon Maurer	Austria	36.434
16	Netta Malkinson; Stav Mizrahi	Israel	36.622
17	Capucine Dubut; Steven Henry	France	37.062
18	Emircan Ayaklı; Hilal Avcı	Turkey	37.782

==== Final A ====
Rank	Kayakers	Country	Time
1st place, gold medalist(s)	Teresa Portela; Kevin Santos	Portugal	34.260
2nd place, silver medalist(s)	Emma Jørgensen; Magnus Sibbersen	Denmark	34.572
3rd place, bronze medalist(s)	Lena Röhlings; Jacob Schopf	Germany	34.700
4	Nataliia Dokiienko; Oleksandr Zaitsev	Ukraine	34.888
5	Carlos Garrote; Isabel Contreras	Spain	35.208
6	Cristina Petracca; Alessandro Gnecchi	Italy	35.336
7	Katarzyna Kołodziejczyk; Jakub Stepun	Poland	35.468
8	Melānija Čamane; Kārlis Dumpis	Latvia	35.488
9	Anna Lucz; Bence Vajda	Hungary	35.772
