= 2021 ICF Canoe Sprint World Championships – Women's K-1 5000 metres =

Women's K-1 5000 metres at the 2021 ICF Canoe Sprint World Championships
- Venue: Lake Bagsværd
- Location: Copenhagen, Denmark
- Dates: 19 September
- Competitors: 18 from 18 nations
- Winning time: 22:57.48

Medalists
gold medal	Emese Kőhalmi	Hungary
silver medal	Jennifer Egan	Ireland
bronze medal	Lizzie Broughton	Great Britain

The women's K-1 5000 metres competition at the 2021 ICF Canoe Sprint World Championships in Copenhagen took place on Lake Bagsværd.

== Schedule ==
The schedule was as follows:

Date	Time	Round
Sunday 19 September 2021	15:50	Final

All times are Central European Summer Time (UTC+2)

== Results ==
As a long-distance event, it was held as a direct final.

Rank	Kayaker	Country	Time
1st place, gold medalist(s)	Emese Kőhalmi	Hungary	22:57.48
2nd place, silver medalist(s)	Jennifer Egan	Ireland	22:58.58
3rd place, bronze medalist(s)	Lizzie Broughton	Great Britain	22:59.45
4	Linnea Stensils	Sweden	22:59.66
5	Eva Barríos	Spain	23:06.24
6	Ana Roxana Lehaci	Austria	23:13.12
7	Cathrine Rask	Denmark	23:21.10
8	Kristina Bedeč	Serbia	23:21.76
9	Inna Hryshchun	Ukraine	23:22.53
10	Bridgitte Hartley	South Africa	23:23.40
11	Madeline Schmidt	Canada	23:24.93
12	Hermien Peters	Belgium	23:53.40
13	Elena Mironchenko	RCF	23:55.25
14	Uladzislava Skryhanava	Belarus	24:09.58
15	Paulina Paszek	Germany	24:10.24
16	Agata Fantini	Italy	24:26.86
17	Ruth Vorsselman	Netherlands	24:50.70
–	Jia Saw	Singapore	DNS
