= Canoeing at the 2016 Summer Olympics – Women's K-1 500 metres =

2016 summer Olympics - women's canoe sprint K-1 500 m

Women's canoe sprint K-1 500 metres at the Games of the XXXI Olympiad
- Venue: Lagoa Stadium
- Date: 17–18 August
- Competitors: 27 from 27 nations
- Winning time: 1:52.494

Medalists
1st place, gold medalist(s)		Danuta Kozák	Hungary
2nd place, silver medalist(s)		Emma Jørgensen	Denmark
3rd place, bronze medalist(s)		Lisa Carrington	New Zealand

The women's canoe sprint K-1 500 metres competition at the 2016 Olympic Games in Rio de Janeiro took place between 17 and 18 August at Lagoa Stadium.

== Format ==
The competition comprised heats, semifinals, and a final round. The leading five in each heat plus the fastest sixth place advanced to the semifinals. The top two from each of the three semifinals plus the two best third-place times advanced to the "A" final, and competed for medals. The next eight fastest advanced to the "B" final.

== Schedule ==
All times are Brasilia Time (UTC-03:00)

Date	Time	Round
Wednesday, 17 August 2016	09:58; 11:17	Heats; Semifinals
Thursday, 18 August 2016	10:04	Finals

== Results ==
=== Heats ===
The leading five in each heat plus the fastest sixth place advanced to the semifinals.

==== Heat 1 ====
Rank	Canoer	Country	Time	Notes
1	Lisa Carrington	New Zealand	1:54.765	SF
2	Emma Jørgensen	Denmark	1:55.660	SF
3	Teresa Portela	Portugal	1:56.439	SF
4	Rachel Cawthorn	Great Britain	1:56.612	SF
5	Zoya Ananchenko	Kazakhstan	1:58.136	SF
6	Yusmari Mengana	Cuba	2:02.162	
7	Afef Ben Ismail	Tunisia	2:08.170	

==== Heat 2 ====
Rank	Canoer	Country	Time	Notes
1	Danuta Kozák	Hungary	1:53.427	SF
2	Maryna Litvinchuk	Belarus	1:53.966	SF
3	Bridgitte Hartley	South Africa	1:55.737	SF
4	Franziska Weber	Germany	1:56.601	SF
5	Lasma Liepa	Turkey	1:59.581	SF
6	Ana Paula Vergutz	Brazil	2:00.680	
7	Marina Toribiong	Palau	2:14.807	

==== Heat 3 ====
Rank	Canoer	Country	Time	Notes
1	Zhou Yu	China	1:53.043	SF
2	Émilie Fournel	Canada	1:53.670	SF
3	Mariya Povh	Ukraine	1:54.247	SF
4	Karin Johansson	Sweden	1:55.049	SF
5	Špela Ponomarenko Janić	Slovenia	1:55.934	SF
6	Maggie Hogan	United States	1:58.970	
7	Anne Cairns	Samoa	2:01.885	

==== Heat 4 ====
Rank	Canoer	Country	Time	Notes
1	Inna Osypenko-Radomska	Azerbaijan	1:51.750	SF
2	Ewelina Wojnarowska	Poland	1:52.193	SF
3	Elena Aniushina	Russia	1:52.597	SF
4	Martina Kohlová	Slovakia	1:53.167	SF
5	Dalma Ružičić-Benedek	Serbia	1:54.048	SF
6	Naomi Flood	Australia	1:54.150	SF

=== Semifinals ===
The top two from each of the semifinals plus the two best third-place times advanced to the "A" final. The next eight fastest advanced to the "B" final.

==== Semifinal 1 ====
Rank	Canoer	Country	Time	Notes
1	Maryna Litvinchuk	Belarus	1:55.641	FA
2	Lisa Carrington	New Zealand	1:56.155	FA
3	Dalma Ružičić-Benedek	Serbia	1:57.294	FA
4	Karin Johansson	Sweden	1:59.321	FB
5	Ewelina Wojnarowska	Poland	1:59.458	FB
6	Mariya Povh	Ukraine	2:00.714	
7	Zoya Ananchenko	Kazakhstan	2:01.660	

==== Semifinal 2 ====
Rank	Canoer	Country	Time	Notes
1	Danuta Kozák	Hungary	1:54.241	FA
2	Emma Jørgensen	Denmark	1:55.193	FA
3	Zhou Yu	China	1:55.311	FA
4	Elena Aniushina	Russia	1:57.229	FB
5	Martina Kohlová	Slovakia	1:57.801	FB
6	Naomi Flood	Australia	2:01.910	
7	Lasma Liepa	Turkey	2:08.450	

==== Semifinal 3 ====
Rank	Canoer	Country	Time	Notes
1	Franziska Weber	Germany	1:56.515	FA
2	Inna Osypenko-Radomska	Azerbaijan	1:57.627	FA
3	Špela Ponomarenko Janić	Slovenia	1:58.098	FB
4	Teresa Portela	Portugal	1:58.360	FB
5	Bridgitte Hartley	South Africa	1:58.397	FB
6	Rachel Cawthorn	Great Britain	1:58.410	FB
7	Émilie Fournel	Canada	1:59.638	

=== Finals ===
==== Final B ====
Rank	Canoer	Country	Time	Notes
1	Elena Aniushina	Russia	1:57.202	
2	Špela Ponomarenko Janić	Slovenia	1:57.541	
3	Teresa Portela	Portugal	1:58.058	
4	Ewelina Wojnarowska	Poland	1:58.167	
5	Martina Kohlová	Slovakia	1:58.211	
6	Karin Johansson	Sweden	1:58.363	
7	Rachel Cawthorn	Great Britain	1:58.470	
8	Bridgitte Hartley	South Africa	2:01.890	

==== Final A ====
Rank	Canoer	Country	Time	Notes
1st place, gold medalist(s)	Danuta Kozák	Hungary	1:52.494	
2nd place, silver medalist(s)	Emma Jørgensen	Denmark	1:54.326	
3rd place, bronze medalist(s)	Lisa Carrington	New Zealand	1:54.372	
4	Maryna Litvinchuk	Belarus	1:54.474	
5	Franziska Weber	Germany	1:54.553	
6	Zhou Yu	China	1:54.994	
7	Dalma Ružičić-Benedek	Serbia	1:55.095	
8	Inna Osypenko-Radomska	Azerbaijan	1:56.573	
