= Canoe sprint at the 2023 European Games – Women's K-1 200 metres =

Women's K-1 200 metres at the 2023 European Games
- Venue: Kryspinów Waterway
- Date: 22–23 June
- Competitors: 15 from 15 nations
- Winning time: 40.106

Medalists
gold medal	Emma Jørgensen	Denmark
silver medal	Milica Novaković	Serbia
bronze medal	Francisca Laia	Portugal

The women's K-1 200 metres canoe sprint competition at the 2023 European Games took place on 23 and 24 June at the Kryspinów Waterway.

== Schedule ==
All times are local (UTC+2).

Date	Time	Round
Thursday, 22 June 2023	9:49	Heats
Thursday, 22 June 2023	16:28	Semifinal
Friday, 23 June 2023	15:22	Final

== Results ==
=== Heats ===
==== Heat 1 ====
Rank	Kayaker	Country	Time	Notes
1	Emma Jørgensen	Denmark	39.773	QF
2	Anna Lucz	Hungary	39.865	QF
3	Francisca Laia	Portugal	40.173	QF
4	Milica Novaković	Serbia	40.685	QS
5	Diana Rybak	Ukraine	41.565	QS
6	Madara Aldiņa	Latvia	41.785	QS
7	Adéla Házová	Czech Republic	41.997	QS
8	Aleksandra Mihalashvili	Bulgaria	43.353	qS

==== Heat 2 ====
Rank	Kayaker	Country	Time	Notes
1	Dominika Putto	Poland	40.452	QF
2	Špela Ponomarenko Janić	Slovenia	40.772	QF
3	Julia Lagerstam	Sweden	41.961	QF
4	Elisa Zapata	Spain	42.659	QS
5	Hilal Avcı	Turkey	42.823	QS
6	Franziska Widmer	Switzerland	43.543	QS
7	Netta Malkinson	Israel	45.337	QS

=== Semifinal ===
Rank	Kayaker	Country	Time	Notes
1	Milica Novaković	Serbia	41.331	QF
2	Diana Rybak	Ukraine	42.355	QF
3	Madara Aldiņa	Latvia	42.840	QF
4	Elisa Zapata	Spain	42.900	
5	Adéla Házová	Czech Republic	43.192	
6	Hilal Avcı	Turkey	43.616	
7	Aleksandra Mihalashvili	Bulgaria	43.850	
8	Franziska Widmer	Switzerland	44.170	
9	Netta Malkinson	Israel	46.248	

=== Final ===
Rank	Kayaker	Country	Time
1st place, gold medalist(s)	Emma Jørgensen	Denmark	40.106
2nd place, silver medalist(s)	Milica Novaković	Serbia	41.006
3rd place, bronze medalist(s)	Francisca Laia	Portugal	41.058
4	Anna Lucz	Hungary	41.076
5	Dominika Putto	Poland	41.130
6	Špela Ponomarenko Janić	Slovenia	41.742
7	Julia Lagerstam	Sweden	42.294
8	Madara Aldiņa	Latvia	42.834
9	Diana Rybak	Ukraine	42.908
