= Canoeing at the 2018 Mediterranean Games – Women's K-1 500 metres =

Women's canoe sprint K-1 500 metres at the 2018 Mediterranean Games
- Venue: Canal Olímpic de Catalunya
- Date: 23–24 June 2018
- Competitors: 11 from 11 nations
- Winning time: 1:53.637

Medalists
gold medal	Milica Starović	Serbia
silver medal	Joana Vasconcelos	Portugal
bronze medal	Anja Osterman	Slovenia

The women's canoe sprint K-1 500 metres at the 2018 Mediterranean Games in Tarragona took place between 23 and 24 June at the Canal Olímpic de Catalunya.

== Schedule ==
All times are Spain time (UTC+02:00)

Date	Time	Round
Saturday, 23 June 2018	09:00; 12:00	Heats; Semifinal
Sunday, 24 June 2018	10:00	Final

== Results ==
=== Heats ===
==== Heat 1 ====
Rank	Canoer	Country	Time	Notes
1	Teresa Portela Rivas	Spain	1:52.998	QF
2	Milica Starović	Serbia	1:53.133	QF
3	Anamaria Govorčinović	Croatia	1:54.927	QF
4	Hilal Avcı	Turkey	1:56.414	QS
5	Irene Burgo	Italy	1:58.754	QS
6	Eleftheria Kaminari	Greece	2:07.215	QS

==== Heat 2 ====
Rank	Canoer	Country	Time	Notes
1	Joana Vasconcelos	Portugal	1:53.267	QF
2	Léa Jamelot	France	1:55.012	QF
3	Anja Osterman	Slovenia	1:58.838	QF
4	Khaoula Sassi	Tunisia	2:04.305	QS
5	Halla Bouzid	Algeria	2:24.732	QS

=== Semifinal ===
Rank	Canoer	Country	Time	Notes
1	Irene Burgo	Italy	1:56.146	QF
2	Hilal Avcı	Turkey	1:57.847	QF
3	Khaoula Sassi	Tunisia	2:01.707	QF
4	Eleftheria Kaminari	Greece	2:04.057	
5	Halla Bouzid	Algeria	2:24.050	

=== Final ===
Rank	Canoer	Country	Time
1st place, gold medalist(s)	Milica Starović	Serbia (SRB)	1:53.637
2nd place, silver medalist(s)	Joana Vasconcelos	Portugal (POR)	1:54.936
3rd place, bronze medalist(s)	Anja Osterman	Slovenia (SLO)	1:55.650
4	Teresa Portela Rivas	Spain (ESP)	1:56.021
5	Anamaria Govorčinović	Croatia (CRO)	1:58.531
6	Léa Jamelot	France (FRA)	1:58.719
7	Hilal Avcı	Turkey (TUR)	1:58.874
8	Irene Burgo	Italy (ITA)	1:59.910
9	Khaoula Sassi	Tunisia (TUN)	2:06.777

QF=Qualified for final, QS=Qualified for semifinal
