= 2024 ICF Canoe Sprint World Championships – Mixed K-2 500 metres =

Mixed K-2 500 metres at the 2024 ICF Canoe Sprint World Championships
- Venue: Rowing and Canoeing Race Course in Samarkand
- Location: Samarkand, Uzbekistan
- Dates: 23–24 August
- Competitors: 30 from 15 nations
- Winning time: 1:37.592

Medalists
gold medal	Teresa Portela; Messias Baptista	Portugal
silver medal	Volha Khudzenka; Dzmitry Natynchyk	Individual Neutral Athletes
bronze medal	Josef Dostál; Anežka Paloudová	Czech Republic

The mixed K-2 500 metres competition at the 2024 ICF Canoe Sprint World Championships in Samarkand took place in Rowing and Canoeing Race Course in Samarkand.

== Schedule ==
The schedule is as follows:

Date	Time	Round
Friday 23 August 2024	10:30	Heats
Friday 23 August 2024	11:40	Semifinal
Saturday 24 August 2024	14:38	Final A

== Results ==
=== Heats ===
The fastest three boats in each heat advanced directly to the final.
The next four fastest boats in each heat, plus the fastest remaining boat advanced to the semifinal

==== Heat 1 ====
Rank	Canoeist	Country	Time	Notes
1	Volha Khudzenka; Dzmitry Natynchyk	Individual Neutral Athletes	1:37.161	QF
2	Josef Dostál; Anežka Paloudová	Czech Republic	1:38.123	QF
3	Martin Nathell; Melina Andersson	Sweden	1:39.278	QF
4	Oleksandr Zaitsev; Nataliia Dokiienko	Ukraine	1:39.367	QS
5	Shakhrizoda Mavlonova; Ozodjon Amriddinov	Uzbekistan	1:40.749	QS
6	Sławomir Witczak; Sandra Ostrowska	Poland	1:52.430	QS
7	Sara Milthers; Thorbjørn Rask	Denmark	1:52.524	QS
8	Miriam Vega; Adrián Martín	Spain	1:55.454	qS

==== Heat 2 ====
Rank	Canoeist	Country	Time	Notes
1	Teresa Portela; Messias Baptista	Portugal	1:38.427	QF
2	Mia Medved; Rok Šmit	Slovenia	1:40.344	QF
3	Kristine Strand Amundsen; Vemund Næss Jensen	Norway	1:40.947	QF
4	Olga Shmelyova; Artyom Terechshenko	Kazakhstan	1:42.197	QS
5	Eszter Rendessy; Levente Kurucz	Hungary	1:54.066	QS
6	Lee Ha-lin; Choi Min-kyu	South Korea	1:45.074	QS
7	Honami Tohda; Kohei Fukada	Japan	1:58.537	QS

=== Semifinal ===
The fastest three boats advanced to the A final.

Rank	Canoeist	Country	Time	Notes
1	Shakhrizoda Mavlonova; Ozodjon Amriddinov	Uzbekistan	1:40.345	QF
2	Sara Milthers; Thorbjørn Rask	Denmark	1:40.727	QF
3	Olga Shmelyova; Artyom Terechshenko	Kazakhstan	1:41.100	QF
4	Eszter Rendessy; Levente Kurucz	Hungary	1:42.084	
5	Miriam Vega; Adrián Martín	Spain	1:44.034	
6	Oleksandr Zaitsev; Nataliia Dokiienko	Ukraine	1:45.316	
7	Lee Ha-lin; Choi Min-kyu	South Korea	1:45.487	
8	Sławomir Witczak; Sandra Ostrowska	Poland	1:46.473	
9	Honami Tohda; Kohei Fukada	Japan	1:49.913	

=== Final ===
Competitors raced for positions 1 to 9, with medals going to the top three.

Rank	Canoeist	Country	Time
1st place, gold medalist(s)	Teresa Portela; Messias Baptista	Portugal	1:37.592
2nd place, silver medalist(s)	Volha Khudzenka; Dzmitry Natynchyk	Individual Neutral Athletes	1:37.603
3rd place, bronze medalist(s)	Josef Dostál; Anežka Paloudová	Czech Republic	1:38.340
4	Mia Medved; Rok Šmit	Slovenia	1:41.113
5	Shakhrizoda Mavlonova; Ozodjon Amriddinov	Uzbekistan	1:41.703
6	Olga Shmelyova; Artyom Terechshenko	Kazakhstan	1:43.199
7	Kristine Strand Amundsen; Vemund Næss Jensen	Norway	1:43.841
8	Martin Nathell; Melina Andersson	Sweden	1:43.977
9	Sara Milthers; Thorbjørn Rask	Denmark	1:47.085
