= 2022 ICF Canoe Sprint World Championships – Women's K-1 1000 metres =

Women's K-1 1000 metres at the 2022 ICF Canoe Sprint World Championships
- Venue: Lake Banook
- Location: Dartmouth, Canada
- Dates: 4–7 August
- Competitors: 14 from 14 nations
- Winning time: 4:27.65

Medalists
gold medal	Alyssa Bull	Australia
silver medal	Eszter Rendessy	Hungary
bronze medal	Anamaria Govorčinović	Croatia

The women's K-1 1000 metres competition at the 2022 ICF Canoe Sprint World Championships in Dartmouth took place on Lake Banook.

== Schedule ==
The schedule is as follows:

Date	Time	Round
Thursday 4 August 2022	11:45	Heats
Friday 5 August 2022	15:31	Semifinal
Sunday 7 August 2022	12:10	Final

== Results ==
=== Heats ===
The fastest three boats in each heat advanced directly to the final.
The next four fastest boats in each heat, plus the fastest remaining boat advanced to the semifinal.

==== Heat 1 ====
Rank	Canoeist	Country	Time	Notes
1	Eszter Rendessy	Hungary	4:14.69	QF
2	Estefanía Fernández	Spain	4:15.51	QF
3	Justyna Iskrzycka	Poland	4:15.81	QF
4	Anežka Paloudová	Czech Republic	4:20.42	QS
5	Julia Hergert	Germany	4:21.00	QS
6	Rebecca Georgsdotter	Sweden	4:28.18	QS
7	Courtney Stott	Canada	4:33.16	QS
8	Aylín González	Mexico	4:36.25	qS

==== Heat 2 ====
Rank	Canoeist	Country	Time	Notes
1	Alyssa Bull	Australia	4:18.02	QF
2	Anamaria Govorčinović	Croatia	4:21.14	QF
3	Pernille Knudsen	Denmark	4:25.32	QF
4	Irene Burgo	Italy	4:31.10	QS
5	Angelica See	Singapore	4:55.91	QS
6	Savanna Wright	United States	5:52.73	QS

=== Semifinal ===
The fastest three boats advanced to the final.

Rank	Canoeist	Country	Time	Notes
1	Anežka Paloudová	Czech Republic	4:21.48	QF
2	Irene Burgo	Italy	4:22.59	QF
3	Julia Hergert	Germany	4:23.04	QF
4	Rebecca Georgsdotter	Sweden	4:23.29	
5	Courtney Stott	Canada	4:33.40	
6	Aylín González	Mexico	4:40.68	
7	Angelica See	Singapore	4:54.42	
8	Savanna Wright	United States	5:17.00	

=== Final ===
Competitors raced for positions 1 to 9, with medals going to the top three.

Rank	Canoeist	Country	Time
1st place, gold medalist(s)	Alyssa Bull	Australia	4:27.65
2nd place, silver medalist(s)	Eszter Rendessy	Hungary	4:28.97
3rd place, bronze medalist(s)	Anamaria Govorčinović	Croatia	4:33.62
4	Justyna Iskrzycka	Poland	4:34.46
5	Anežka Paloudová	Czech Republic	4:38.21
6	Estefanía Fernández	Spain	4:38.48
7	Pernille Knudsen	Denmark	4:40.00
8	Julia Hergert	Germany	4:41.88
9	Irene Burgo	Italy	4:53.24
