= Hilal Avcı =

Turkish sprint kayaker (born 1996)

Personal information
- Nationality: Turkish
- Born: 4 July 1988 (age 37) Rize, Turkey

Sport
- Sport: Kayaking
- Event(s): K-1 200 m, K-1 500 m
Medal record
Women's Canoe Sprint
Representing Turkey

Hilal Avcı (born 1996) is a Turkish sprint kayaker. She competes in the K-1 200 m, 500 m, 1000 m as well as in the Mixed K-2 200 m and 500 m events.

== Personal life ==
Hilal Avcı was born in Rize, northeastern Turkey in 1996.

== Early years ==
Avcı started her career in canoeing at the age of eleven.

She won the gold medal at the 2013 International Azerbaijan Presidential Canoe Sprint Championships held in Mingachevir.

In 2017, she competed in the U23 category at the European Junior and U23 Canoe Sprint Championships in Belgrade, Serbia, and ranked 12th in the K-1 500 m and 9th in the K-1 1000 m event.

== Sport career ==
=== 2017 ===
At the 2017 ICF Canoe Sprint World Championships in Račice, Czech Republic, she was not successful in the Heat B of the K-1 500 m event and placed sixth in the semifinals of the K-1 1000 m event and could not advance to the finals.

=== 2018 ===
She took part at the 2018 Canoe Sprint European Championships in Belgrade, Serbia, and finished the K-1 500 m event in the Final B at 12th place.

She represented her country at the 2018 Mediterranean Games in Tarragona, Spain, and finished the K-1 500 m event on seventh place.

=== 2019 ===
At the 2019 European Games in the Zaslavl Regatta Course, Poland, she ranked sixth in the Final B of the K-1 500 m event.

She took the third place in the Final C of the K-1 500 m event at the 2019 ICF Canoe Sprint World Championships Szeged, Hungary.

=== 2020 ===
During the COVID-19 pandemic in Turkey, she received all the training equipment delibered by the Sports Directoriate of Rize at her home so that she could continue with her exercises needed.

On the occasion of the Commemoration of Atatürk, Youth and Sports Day, which is held every year to commemorate the landing of Mustafa Kemal Pasha in Samsun on 19 May 1919 that marks the start of the Turkish War of Independence, Avcı made a sport show on 18 May 2020, paddling for 19 minutes and 19 seconds.

=== 2021 ===
She took part at the 2021 Canoe Sprint European Olympic Quaalifier and World Cup in Szeged, Hungary. She finished the K-1 500 m event at 5th place in the Final C and the Mixed K-2 200 m event together with Serkan Kakkaç at 6th place.

Avcıcompeted in the K-1 500 m event at the 2021 Olympic Qualifier and World Cup in Barnaul, Russia, but was eliminated in the semifinals.

=== 2022 ===
At the 2022 Canoe Sprint World Cup in Račice, Czech Republic, she failed in the semifinals of the K-1 200 m event, and was eliminated in the K-1 500 m ecent. The semifinals performance of her and teammate Serkan Kakkaç şn the Mixed K*2 500 m event was not sufficient for the finals.

In Poznań, Poland, she finished the K-1 200 m event at 6th place in the semifinals of the 2022 World Cup 2, but the event was not continued due to bad weather conditions. In the K-1 500 m event, she was eliminated. She and her teammate Serkan Kakkaç finished the semifinals of the Mixed K-2 500 m event at 7th place.

=== 2023 ===
At the 2023 European Games in Kryspinów, Poland, her time of 43.616 in the semifinals of the K-1 200 m event was not enough for the finals, and she finished the K-1 500 m event at place 17.

At the First Leg of the 2023 Canoe Sprint World Cup in Szeged, Hungary, she placed 22nd in the K-1 200 m and 32nd in the K-1 500 m event. She and her teammate Fahri Ayvaz took the 9th place in the Mixed K-2 500 m event.

She competed at the 2023 ICF Canoe Sprint World Championships in Duisburg, Germany. She could not reach the finals in the K-1 200 m and K-1 500 m events.

=== 2024 ===
At the 2024 Canoe Sprint Euroean Olympic Qualifier and World Cup in Szeged, Hungary, Avcı finished the semifinals of the K-1 200 m event at 5th place. In the K-1 500 m event, se took the second place şn the Final E.
