= Emma Jørgensen =

Danish canoeist (born 1996)

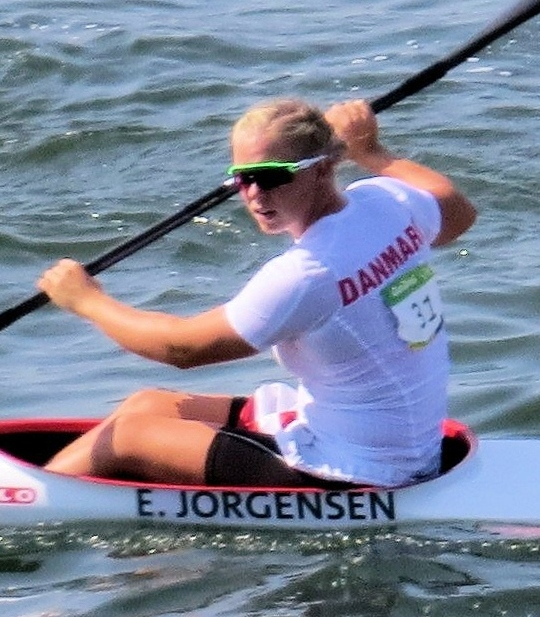
- Jørgensen at the 2016 Summer Olympics

Personal information
- Full name: Emma Aastrand Jørgensen
- Nationality: Danish
- Born: 30 January 1996 (age 30) Bagsværd, Denmark
- Height: 1.68 m (5 ft 6 in)
- Weight: 70 kg (154 lb)

Sport
- Country: Denmark
- Sport: Sprint kayak
- Club: Maribo Kajakklub
- Coached by: Zoltán Bakó
Medal record
Women's canoe sprint
Representing Denmark
Olympic Games
Silver medal – second place	2016 Rio de Janeiro	K-1 500 m
Bronze medal – third place	2020 Tokyo	K-1 200 m
Bronze medal – third place	2020 Tokyo	K-1 500 m
Bronze medal – third place	2024 Paris	K-1 500 m
World Championships
Gold medal – first place	2014 Moscow	K-2 1000 m
Gold medal – first place	2021 Copenhagen	K-1 200 m
Gold medal – first place	2023 Duisburg	K-2 500 m
Silver medal – second place	2017 Račice	K-1 200 m
Silver medal – second place	2018 Montemor-o-Velho	K-1 200 m
Silver medal – second place	2023 Duisburg	K-1 500 m
Bronze medal – third place	2017 Račice	K-1 500 m
Bronze medal – third place	2019 Szeged	K-1 200 m
Bronze medal – third place	2021 Copenhagen	K-1 500 m
European Games
Gold medal – first place	2019 Minsk	K-1 200 m
Gold medal – first place	2023 Kraków-Małopolska	K-1 200 m
Gold medal – first place	2023 Kraków-Małopolska	K-1 500 m
Silver medal – second place	2023 Kraków-Małopolska	K-2 500 m
Silver medal – second place	2023 Kraków-Małopolska	K-2 Mix 200 m
Bronze medal – third place	2019 Minsk	K-1 500 m
European Championships
Gold medal – first place	2021 Poznań	K-1 200 m
Gold medal – first place	2021 Poznań	K-1 500 m
Gold medal – first place	2022 Munich	K-1 200 m
Gold medal – first place	2024 Szeged	K-2 500 m
Silver medal – second place	2017 Plovdiv	K-1 200 m
Silver medal – second place	2024 Szeged	K-1 500 m
Bronze medal – third place	2016 Moscow	K-1 500 m
Bronze medal – third place	2018 Belgrade	K-1 200 m
Bronze medal – third place	2021 Poznań	K-4 500 m
Bronze medal – third place	2022 Munich	K-1 500 m

Emma Aastrand Jørgensen (born 30 January 1996) is a Danish sprint canoeist. She and her team-mate Henriette Engel Hansen won the women's K-2 1000 m title at the 2014 World Championships.

== Career ==
She competed at the 2016 Summer Olympics, winning the silver medal in K-1 500 metres. She was defeated by the defending champion Danuta Kozák. She won a bronze medal at the 2016 European Championships in the same category. Jørgensen competed at the 2020 Summer Olympics, winning a bronze medal in the K-1 200 metres event, finishing behind Lisa Carrington and Teresa Portela and also in the K-1 500 metres event, finishing behind Lisa Carrington and Tamara Csipes. At her third Olympic Games in Paris, she won her second bronze medal in the K-1 500 metres event, finishing behind Lisa Carrington and Tamara Csipes, just as she had three years earlier in Tokyo.
