= Madeline Schmidt =

Canadian sprint kayaker

Personal information
- Born: May 11, 1995 (age 31) Ottawa, Ontario, Canada

Sport
- Country: Canada
- Sport: Sprint kayak
Medal record
Women's Kayaking
Representing Canada
Pan American Games
| Bronze medal – third place | 2023 Santiago | K-2 500 m |
World Championships
| Silver medal – second place | 2023 Duisburg | K-1 5000 m |

Madeline Schmidt (born May 5, 1995) is a Canadian sprint kayaker.

== Career ==
In 2018, as part of the K-4 boat, Schmidt finished in 9th place at the 2018 World Championships. In 2019, Schmidt finished 24th overall in the K-1 500 event at the 2019 World Championships.

In May 2021, Schmidt was named to Canada's 2020 Olympic team.
