= Sabine Volz =

German canoeist

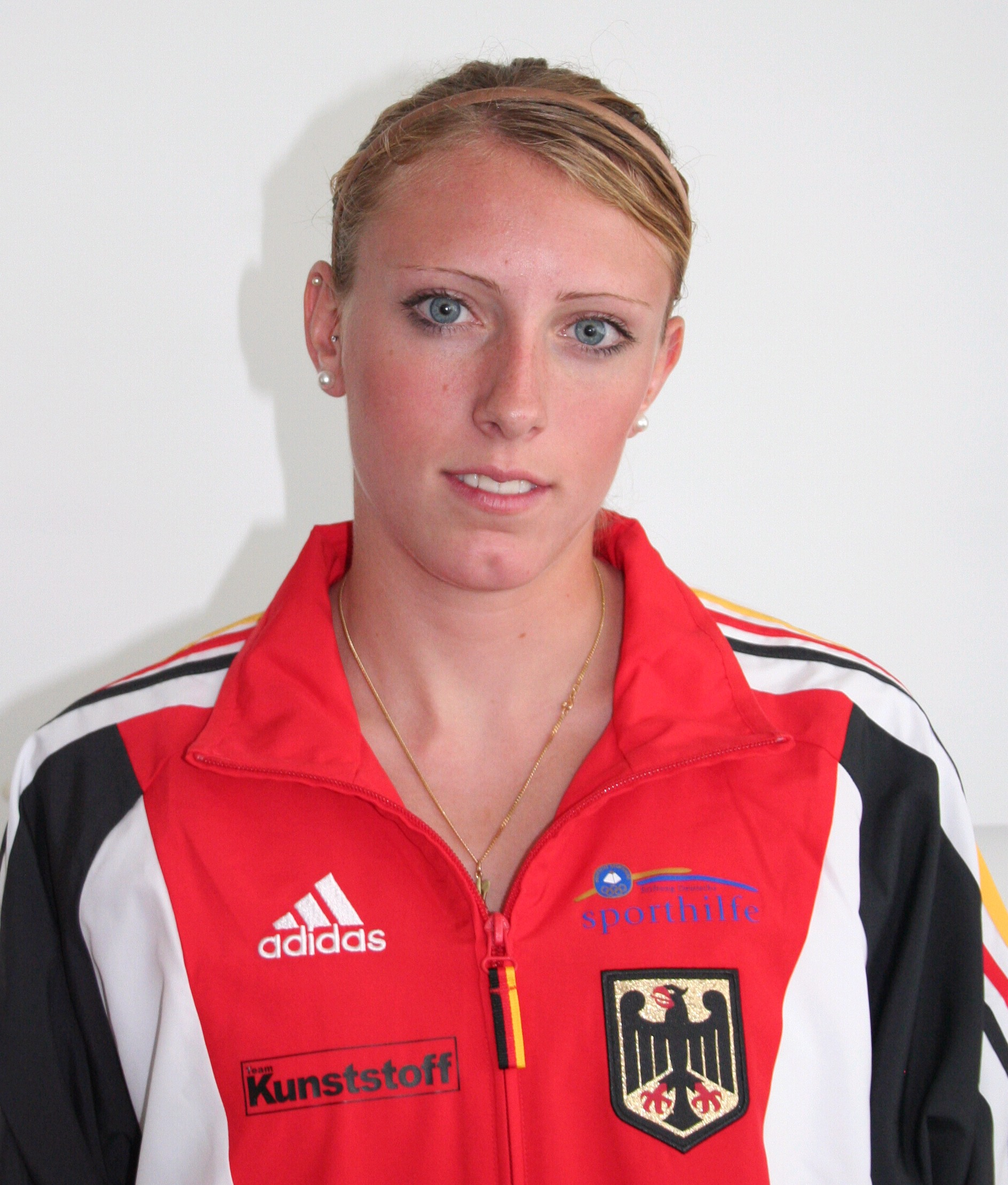
- Sabine Volz

Personal information
- Nationality: German
- Born: 12 July 1990 (age 35)

Sport
- Sport: Canoe sprint
Medal record
Women's canoe sprint
Representing Germany
Gold medal – first place	2016 European Canoe Sprint Olympic Qualifier	K1 200 m

Sabine Volz (born 12 July 1990) is a German canoeist. She began paddling when she was 6 years old in Raunheim, Germany. Volz is part of the Rheinbruder Karlsruhe club. In 2019, she was on Ninja Warrior Germany.
