= Lisa Carrington =

New Zealand canoeist (born 1989)

Dame Lisa Carrington DNZM
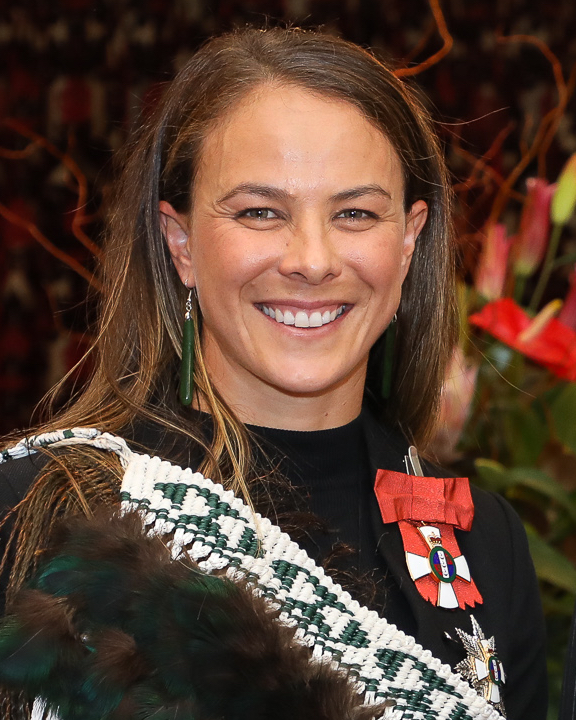
- Carrington in 2022

Personal information
- Full name: Lisa Marie Carrington
- Born: 23 June 1989 (age 37) Tauranga, New Zealand
- Height: 1.68 m (5 ft 6 in)
- Spouse: Michael Buck (m. 2022)

Sport
- Country: New Zealand
- Sport: Sprint kayak
- Events: K-1 200 m, K-1 500 m, K-2 500 m, K-4 500 m
- Club: Eastern Bay Canoe Racing Club (Whakatāne)
- Coached by: Gordon Walker (2010–present)
Medal record
Women's canoe sprint
Representing New Zealand
Event	1st	2nd	3rd
Olympic Games	8	0	1
World Championships	15	5	2
Total	23	5	3
Olympic Games
Gold medal – first place	2012 London	K-1 200 m
Gold medal – first place	2016 Rio de Janeiro	K-1 200 m
Gold medal – first place	2020 Tokyo	K-1 200 m
Gold medal – first place	2020 Tokyo	K-1 500 m
Gold medal – first place	2020 Tokyo	K-2 500 m
Gold medal – first place	2024 Paris	K-1 500 m
Gold medal – first place	2024 Paris	K-2 500 m
Gold medal – first place	2024 Paris	K-4 500 m
Bronze medal – third place	2016 Rio de Janeiro	K-1 500 m
World Championships
Gold medal – first place	2011 Szeged	K-1 200 m
Gold medal – first place	2013 Duisburg	K-1 200 m
Gold medal – first place	2014 Moscow	K-1 200 m
Gold medal – first place	2015 Milan	K-1 200 m
Gold medal – first place	2015 Milan	K-1 500 m
Gold medal – first place	2017 Račice	K-1 200 m
Gold medal – first place	2017 Račice	K-2 500 m
Gold medal – first place	2018 Montemor-o-Velho	K-1 200 m
Gold medal – first place	2019 Szeged	K-1 200 m
Gold medal – first place	2019 Szeged	K-1 500 m
Gold medal – first place	2022 Dartmouth	K-1 200 m
Gold medal – first place	2022 Dartmouth	K-1 500 m
Gold medal – first place	2023 Duisburg	K-1 200 m
Gold medal – first place	2023 Duisburg	K-1 500 m
Gold medal – first place	2023 Duisburg	K-4 500 m
Silver medal – second place	2014 Moscow	K-1 500 m
Silver medal – second place	2017 Račice	K-1 500 m
Silver medal – second place	2018 Montemor-o-Velho	K-1 500 m
Silver medal – second place	2018 Montemor-o-Velho	K-2 500 m
Silver medal – second place	2018 Montemor-o-Velho	K-4 500 m
Bronze medal – third place	2013 Duisburg	K-1 500 m
Bronze medal – third place	2017 Račice	K-4 500 m

Dame Lisa Marie Carrington DNZM (born 23 June 1989) is a flatwater canoeist and New Zealand's most successful Olympian, having won a total of eight gold medals and one bronze medal. She won three consecutive gold medals in the Women's K‑1 200 metres at the 2012 Summer Olympics, 2016 Summer Olympics and 2020 Summer Olympics, as well as gold in the same event at the 2011 Canoe Sprint World Championships. At the 2020 Summer Olympics she also won a gold medal in the K‑2 500 metres, with Caitlin Regal, and as an individual in the K‑1 500 metres. At the 2024 Summer Olympics in Paris, Carrington defended her titles in the K‑1 500 metres and K‑2 500 metres event (with Alicia Hoskin) and also won the K‑4 500 metres event. Carrington equalled Danuta Kozák's record of winning all three K-1, K-2, K-4 events, over 500 metres, at one Olympics.

== Early and personal life ==
Born in Tauranga on 23 June 1989, Carrington was raised in Ōhope, a satellite town of Whakatāne in the eastern Bay of Plenty, and is of Te Aitanga-a-Māhaki, Te Whakatōhea and Rongomaiwahine as well as European descent. She attended Whakatane High School, and Massey University in Albany. As a child she played netball and aspired to be a Silver Fern. She married her long-time partner Michael Buck in 2022.. Carrington announced her pregnancy in April 2026 stating she was due in September 2026, and that while her pregnancy was her main priority, she still hoped to compete in the Los Angeles 2028 Summer Olympics.

== Canoeing ==
In June 2009, she won a bronze medal at the World Cup regatta held in Szeged, Hungary, competing alongside Teneale Hatton in the women's K‑2 1000 metres event. In May 2010, the pair won the gold medal in the same event at a World Cup regatta in Vichy, France. In late 2010, she started working with coach Gordon Walker.

Carrington and Hatton won three gold medals at the 2010 Oceania Canoe Championships; they won the 500 and 1000 metres K‑2 events and were joined by Rachael Dodwell and Erin Taylor to win the K‑4 500 metres. The pair became the first New Zealanders ever to reach a World Championship A final at the ICF Canoe Sprint World Championships in Poznań, Poland. Their time of one minute 42.365 seconds in the semi-finals meant they qualified third fastest for the final of the K‑2 500 metres, however they finished the final in ninth position.

At the 2011 ICF Canoe Sprint World Championships in Szeged, Carrington won the gold medal in the women's K‑1 200 metres event; and became the first New Zealand woman to win a canoeing World Championship title. The result secured an Olympic qualification berth for New Zealand. She was also honoured with the Māori Senior Sports Woman of the Year Award.

Carrington represented New Zealand at the 2012 Summer Olympics in London. In the K‑2 500 metres, Carrington and Erin Taylor finished 7th, and in the K‑1 200 metres Carrington won the gold medal. At the 2012 Oceania Championships, Carrington won gold medals in the K‑1 200 metres and in the K‑2 200 metres with Taylor.

At the 2016 Summer Olympics in Rio de Janeiro, Brazil, she defended her gold medal in the K‑1 200 metres event and won a bronze medal in the K‑1 500 metres event. In doing so, she became the first New Zealand woman to win multiple medals at the same Olympic games. Carrington was the flag bearer at the 2016 closing ceremony.

At the 2019 Canoe Sprint World Championships in Szeged, Carrington won gold medals in the K‑1 500 metres and K‑1 200 metres events.

On 3 August 2021, at the 2020 Summer Olympics in Tokyo, Carrington won her third consecutive gold medal in the K‑1 200 metres event. On the same day, she and her crewmate Caitlin Regal won a gold medal in the K‑2 500 metres event. On 5 August 2021, she won a further gold medal in the K‑1 500 metres event. With her third gold medal, she became New Zealand's most successful Olympian of all time, with a total of six medals (one more than fellow canoeists Ian Ferguson and Paul MacDonald and equestrian Mark Todd), five of which are gold (one more than Ferguson's previous record). She is also the first New Zealand woman to win three gold medals at a single Olympics, and was referred to by the New Zealand Herald as the "Greatest of All Time (GOAT) in the boat".

In August 2024, Carrington again won three Olympic gold medals at the 2024 Summer Olympics in Paris, in the K4 500m, K2 500m and K1 500m events, the latter event being her eighth career Olympic gold medal and her ninth medal in total.

Carrington stepped away from canoeing for the 2025 season but announced she still had plans to compete in 2028 Summer Olympics in Los Angeles.

== Awards and honours ==
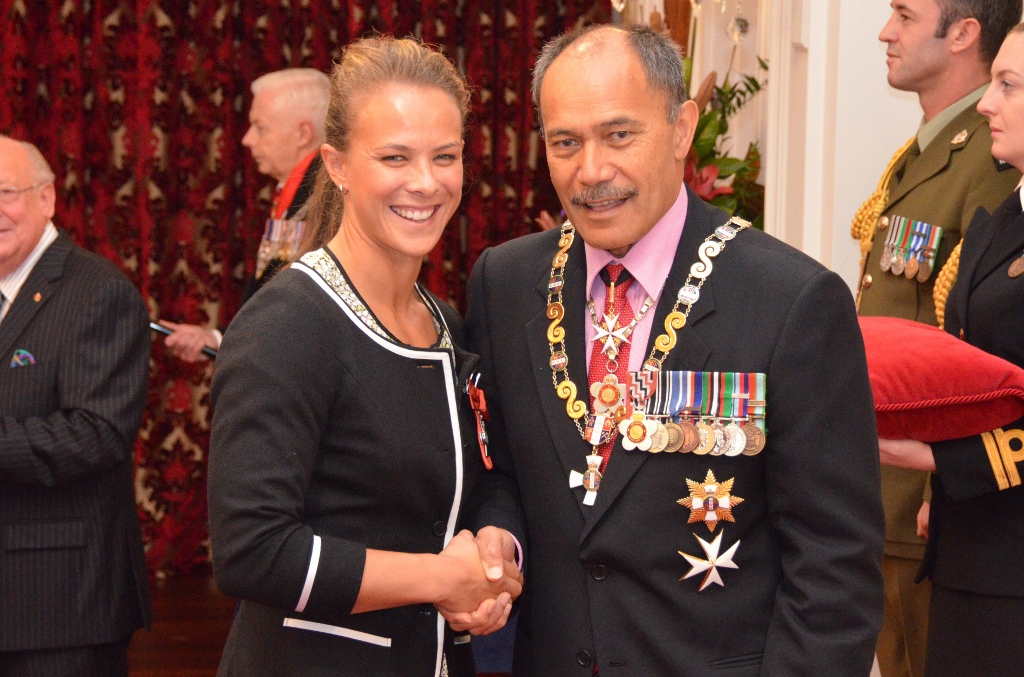
Carrington (left), after her investiture as a Member of the New Zealand Order of Merit by the governor-general, Sir Jerry Mateparae, at Government House, Wellington, on 20 March 2014

Carrington was named as New Zealand's senior Māori sportswoman and overall Māori sportsperson of the year in November 2012. In the 2013 New Year Honours, she was appointed a Member of the New Zealand Order of Merit for services to kayaking. In 2014, Carrington was named the NEXT Woman of the Year in the Sport category. At the 2016, 2017, 2018, 2019 and 2021 Halberg Awards, she won the Sportswoman of the Year, and in 2016 and 2021 she also won the Supreme Award.

On 11 February 2021, Carrington was named the most influential Māori sports personality of the past 30 years in the Māori Sports Awards 30 in 30 show, aired on Māori Television.

In the 2022 New Year Honours, Carrington was promoted to Dame Companion of the New Zealand Order of Merit, for services to canoe racing.

== Sponsorship and advertising work ==
Carrington is an athlete ambassador for Beef and Lamb New Zealand, alongside Eliza McCartney, Sophie Pascoe and Sarah Walker. She is also an ambassador for Southern Cross Health Society. Carrington, together with her dog Colin, have been ambassadors for Nexgard Spectra for Dogs in New Zealand since June 2021.

Awards
Preceded by Lydia Ko	New Zealand's Sportswoman of the Year; 2016, 2017, 2018, 2019, 2021; 2023	Succeeded by Zoi Sadowski-Synnott
Preceded by Zoi Sadowski-Synnott	New Zealand's Sportswoman of the Year; 2016, 2017, 2018, 2019, 2021; 2023	Succeeded by Lydia Ko
Preceded by All Blacks	Halberg Awards – Supreme Award; 2016; 2021; 2023	Succeeded by Emirates Team New Zealand
Preceded by Silver Ferns	Halberg Awards – Supreme Award; 2016; 2021; 2023	Succeeded by Zoi Sadowski-Synnott
Preceded by Zoi Sadowski-Synnott	Halberg Awards – Supreme Award; 2016; 2021; 2023	Succeeded by Lydia Ko
Preceded by Lydia Ko	Lonsdale Cup; 2016, 2017; 2021; 2023	Succeeded by Black Fern sevens
Preceded by Peter Burling and Blair Tuke	Lonsdale Cup; 2016, 2017; 2021; 2023	Succeeded by Zoi Sadowski-Synnott
Preceded by Zoi Sadowski-Synnott	Lonsdale Cup; 2016, 2017; 2021; 2023	Succeeded by Lydia Ko
