= Vanina Paoletti =

French canoeist

Personal information
- Born: 10 December 1997 (age 28) Saint-Maur-des-Fossés, France
- Height: 1.62 m (5 ft 4 in) (2021)

Sport
- Country: France
- Sport: Canoe sprint

Vanina Paoletti (born 10 December 1997 in Saint-Maur-des-Fossés) is a French canoeist.

In June 2021, she was named in the K4 500 alongside Sarah Guyot, Manon Hostens, Lea Jamelot for the delayed 2020 Summer Games in Tokyo. The bulk of that foursome had finished runners up in Szeged at the 2020 World Cup competition.
