= Anna Lucz =

Hungarian canoeist

Personal information
- Born: 14 April 1999 (age 27) Budapest, Hungary
- Relative: Dóra Lucz (sister)

Sport
- Country: Hungary
- Sport: Sprint kayak
- Club: UTE
Medal record
Women's sprint kayak
Representing Hungary
World Championships
| Gold medal – first place | 2021 Copenhagen | K-2 Mix 200 m |
| Gold medal – first place | 2022 Dartmouth | K-2 200 m |
| Silver medal – second place | 2021 Copenhagen | K-1 200 m |
| Silver medal – second place | 2021 Copenhagen | K-2 200 m |
| Silver medal – second place | 2026 Poznań | K-1 200 m |
| Bronze medal – third place | 2019 Szeged | K-2 200 m |
| Bronze medal – third place | 2022 Dartmouth | K-1 200 m |
| Bronze medal – third place | 2023 Duisburg | K-2 200 m |
European Championships
| Gold medal – first place | 2022 Munich | K-2 200 m |
| Gold medal – first place | 2024 Szeged | K-1 200 m |
| Gold medal – first place | 2024 Szeged | K-2 200 m |
| Gold medal – first place | 2025 Racice | K-1 200 m |
| Silver medal – second place | 2026 Montemor-o-Velho | K-1 200 m |
| Bronze medal – third place | 2021 Poznań | K-2 200 m |
| Bronze medal – third place | 2022 Munich | K-4 500 m |
| Bronze medal – third place | 2025 Racice | K-2 500 m |

Anna Lucz (born 14 April 1999) is a Hungarian sprint canoeist.

She won a medal at the 2019 ICF Canoe Sprint World Championships.

Her sister is Hungarian canoeist Dóra Lucz.
