= Inna Klinova =

Kazakhstani canoeist (born 1986)

Personal information
- Born: 13 May 1986 (age 40) Cherkasy, Ukrainian SSR, Soviet Union

Sport
- Sport: Canoe sprint
Medal record
Women's canoe sprint
Representing Kazakhstan
Asian Championships
Gold medal – first place	2013 Samarkand	K-1 200 m
Gold medal – first place	2013 Samarkand	K-4 500 m
Silver medal – second place	2013 Samarkand	K-2 200 m
Silver medal – second place	2013 Samarkand	K-2 500 m

Inna Klinova (Инна Анатольевна Клинова, born 13 May 1986) is a Kazakhstani canoeist. She competed in the women's K-1 200 metres event at the 2016 Summer Olympics.
