= Ivana Mládková =

Slovak canoeist

Personal information
- Born: Ivana Kmeťová; 30 January 1985 (age 41) Bojnice, Slovak Socialist Republic
- Height: 175 cm (5 ft 9 in)
- Weight: 65 kg (143 lb)

Sport
- Club: ŠCP Bratislava
Medal record
Women's canoe sprint
Representing Slovakia
World Championships
Silver medal – second place	2007 Dusiburg	K2-200 m
Bronze medal – third place	2009 Dartmouth	K2-200 m
Bronze medal – third place	2010 Poznań	K2-200 m
European Championships
Gold medal – first place	2008 Milano	K2-200 m
Silver medal – second place	2005 Poznań	K2-200 m
Silver medal – second place	2007 Pontevedra	K2-200 m
Silver medal – second place	2009 Brandenburg	K2-500 m
Silver medal – second place	2010 Trasona	K2-200 m
Bronze medal – third place	2009 Brandenburg	K2-200 m

Ivana Mládková (née Kmeťová, born 30 January 1985 in Bojnice) is a Slovak sprint canoer who has competed since the late 2000s.

She won three medals in the K2-200m event at the ICF Canoe Sprint World Championships with a silver in 2007 and two bronzes (2009, 2010). She also won six medals at the Canoe Sprint European Championships in that event with a gold in 2008, four silvers (2005, 2007, 2009, 2010) and bronze in 2009.

Mládková was eliminated in the semifinals of the K-2 500 m event at the 2008 Summer Olympics in Beijing. Kmeťová ranked 13th in the K-2 500 m and in the K-1 200 m event (with Martina Kohlová) at the 2012 Summer Olympics in London.
