= Isabel Contreras =

Spanish canoeist

Personal information
- Nationality: Spain
- Born: 25 February 1989 (age 37)
- Height: 1.57 m (5 ft 2 in)

Sport
- Sport: Canoeing
- Event: Women's K-1 500 metres
Medal record
Women's canoe sprint
Representing Spain
European Championships
| Bronze medal – third place | 2022 Munich | K-1 1000 m |
Mediterranean Games
| Gold medal – first place | 2026 Taranto | K-2 500 m |

Isabel Contreras (born 25 February 1989) is a Spanish canoeist. She competed in the 2020 Summer Olympics.
