= Špela Ponomarenko Janić =

Slovenian canoeist (born 1981)

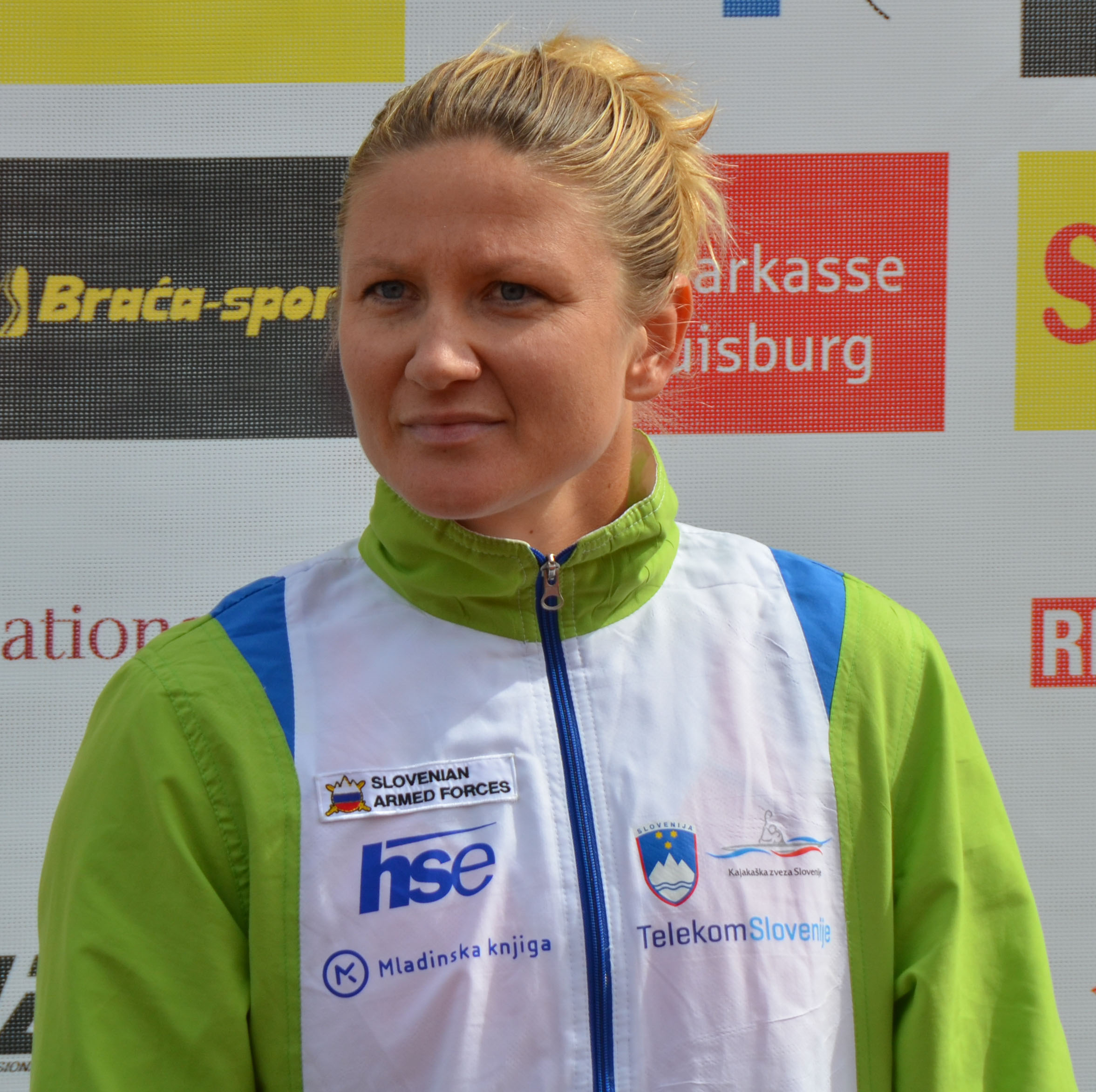

Personal information
- Nationality: Slovenian
- Born: 2 October 1981 (age 44) Koper, SR Slovenia, SFR Yugoslavia
- Height: 1.69 m (5 ft 7 in)
- Weight: 65 kg (143 lb)

Sport
- Country: Slovenia
- Sport: Sprint kayak
- Events: K-1 200 m, K–2 200 m
- Club: KKK Zusterna
Medal record
Women's canoe sprint
Representing Slovenia
World Championships
Silver medal – second place	2006 Szeged	K-1 200 m
Silver medal – second place	2019 Szeged	K-2 200 m
Bronze medal – third place	2007 Duisburg	K-1 200 m
Bronze medal – third place	2013 Duisburg	K-1 200 m
Bronze medal – third place	2017 Račice	K-1 200 m
Bronze medal – third place	2017 Račice	K-2 500 m
Bronze medal – third place	2019 Szeged	K-2 500 m
European Championships
Gold medal – first place	2021 Poznań	K-2 200 m
Silver medal – second place	2017 Plovdiv	K-2 500 m
Bronze medal – third place	2009 Brandenburg	K-1 200 m
Bronze medal – third place	2012 Zagreb	K-1 500 m
Bronze medal – third place	2017 Plovdiv	K-1 200 m
Mediterranean Games
Gold medal – first place	2009 Pescara	K-1 500 m
Gold medal – first place	2013 Mersin	K-1 200 m
Gold medal – first place	2013 Mersin	K-1 500 m

Špela Ponomarenko Janić (born 2 October 1981) is a Slovenian sprint canoer who has won three medals in the K-1 200 m event at the ICF Canoe Sprint World Championships with a silver in 2006 and bronze in 2007 and 2013.

Ponomarenko also finished sixth in the K-1 500 m event at the 2008 Summer Olympics in Beijing.
