= Teresa Portela (Portuguese canoeist) =

Portuguese canoeist

Personal information
- Full name: Teresa do Rosário Afonso Portela
- Nicknames: Te, Tere
- Born: 30 October 1987 (age 38) Esposende, Portugal
- Height: 162 cm (5 ft 4 in)
- Weight: 63 kg (139 lb)

Sport
- Country: Portugal
- Sport: Sprint kayak
- Event(s): K-1 150 m, K-1 200 m, K-1 500 m, K-4 200 m, K-4 500 m
- Club: Benfica
Medal record
Women's canoe sprint
Representing Portugal
World Championships
Gold medal – first place	2024 Samarkand	K-2 Mix 500 m
Silver medal – second place	2022 Dartmouth	K-2 Mix 500 m
Bronze medal – third place	2009 Dartmouth	K-4 200 m
European Games
Gold medal – first place	2023 Kraków-Małopolska	K-2 Mix 200 m
European Championships
Gold medal – first place	2018 Belgrade	K-2 200 m
Bronze medal – third place	2011 Belgrade	K-1 200 m
Bronze medal – third place	2012 Zagreb	K-1 200 m
Bronze medal – third place	2014 Brandenburg	K-1 200 m
Bronze medal – third place	2014 Brandenburg	K-1 500 m
Mediterranean Games
Bronze medal – third place	2018 Taragona	K-1 200 m

Teresa do Rosário Afonso Portela (born 30 October 1987) is a Portuguese sprint canoer who has competed since the late 2000s.

== Career ==
She won a bronze medal in the K-4 200 m event at the 2009 ICF Canoe Sprint World Championships in Dartmouth. At club level, she competes for S.L. Benfica.

Portela also competed in the K-1 500 m event at the 2008 Summer Olympics in Beijing, China, but she was eliminated in the semifinals. In 2010, Portela won the gold in the K1 200m World Cup at Szeged, Hungary. In 2011, she won a bronze medal at the European Championships in Belgrade and also won the World Cup II meet, both in the K1 200 discipline. That year, Portela won her 50th national title, having won a total of 52.

Portela qualified for London 2012 in K4 500, K1 500 and K1 200 at the World Championships in Szeged 2011. After a year off, Portela was back racing in 2014 winning a medal at the World Cup in Szeged and double bronze in the Europeans, finishing with a 5th place in the K1 500 m in the World Championships in Moscow, Russia.

== Major results ==
=== Olympic Games ===
Year	K-1 200	K-1 500	K-2 500	K-4 500
2008	—N/a	6 SF		
2012		8	3 FB	6
2016		3 FB		
2020	1 FB	7		
2024	—N/a	2 FB		

=== World championships ===
Year	K-1 200	K-1 500	K-2 200	K-2 500	K-2 1000	K-4 200	K-4 500	XK-2 500	XK-4 500	K-1 4 × 200
2005	7 FB	7 SF			7 SF			—N/a	—N/a	—N/a
2006			6 FB	7 SF	7 FB			—N/a	—N/a	—N/a
2007						4	8	—N/a	—N/a	—N/a
2009		5 FB				3rd place, bronze medalist(s)	6	—N/a	—N/a	
2010	6	4				—N/a	6	—N/a	—N/a	4
2011	6	6				—N/a	7	—N/a	—N/a	
2014	7	5				—N/a		—N/a	—N/a	
2015	8 FB	9				—N/a		—N/a	—N/a	—N/a
2017	9	7				—N/a	1 FB	—N/a	—N/a	—N/a
2018				8		—N/a	8 H	—N/a	—N/a	—N/a
2019	8					—N/a	9 SF	—N/a	—N/a	—N/a
2021	5	6			—N/a	—N/a		—N/a	—N/a	—N/a
2022	6	1 FB			—N/a	—N/a		2nd place, silver medalist(s)	—N/a	—N/a
2023		8			—N/a	—N/a	9 FB		—N/a	—N/a
2024		—N/a	DSQ	—N/a	—N/a	—N/a	—N/a	1st place, gold medalist(s)	DSQ	—N/a
