= Milica Novaković =

Serbian canoeist

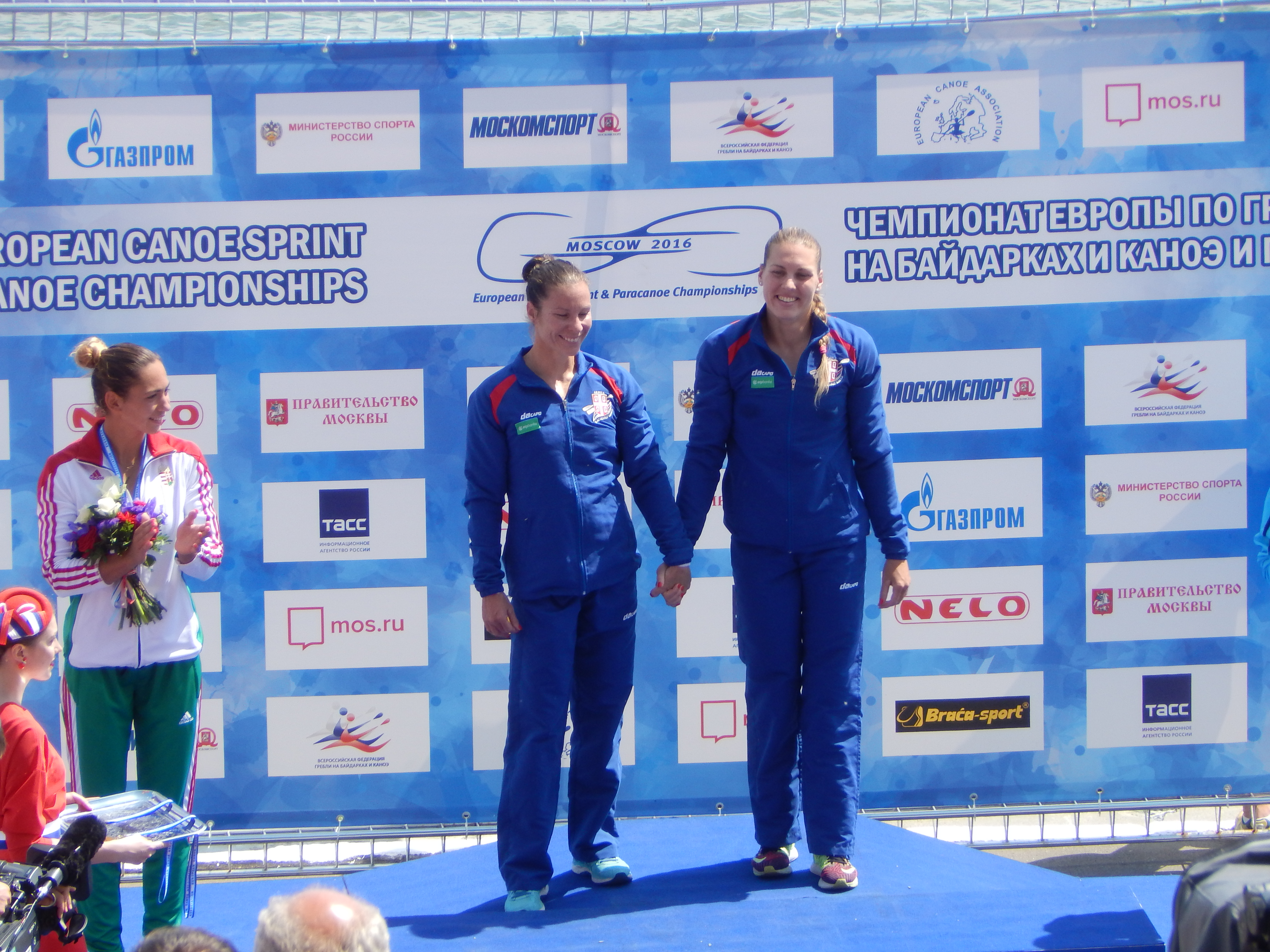
- Milica Starović (right) with Dalma Ružičić-Benedek at the 2016 European Championships in Moscow

Personal information
- Born: Milica Starović; 19 May 1988 (age 38) Novi Sad, SR Serbia, Yugoslavia
- Height: 1.76 m (5 ft 9 in)
- Weight: 74 kg (163 lb)

Sport
- Country: Serbia
- Sport: Canoe sprint
- Club: KKK Vojvodina
Medal record
World Championships
Silver medal – second place	2015 Milan	K-2 500 m
Bronze medal – third place	2017 Račice	K-1 200 m
European Championships
Gold medal – first place	2016 Moscow	K-2 1000 m
Bronze medal – third place	2015 Račice	K-2 500 m
Bronze medal – third place	2015 Račice	K-2 1000 m
Bronze medal – third place	2024 Szeged	K-1 500 m
Bronze medal – third place	2025 Račice	K-1 200 m
Bronze medal – third place	2025 Račice	K-1 500 m
European Games
Gold medal – first place	2015 Baku	K-2 500 m
Silver medal – second place	2023 Kraków-Małopolska	K-1 200 m
Bronze medal – third place	2023 Kraków-Małopolska	K-1 500 m
Mediterranean Games
Gold medal – first place	2018 Tarragona	K-1 500 m
Bronze medal – third place	2013 Mersin	K-1 200 m
Universiade
Bronze medal – third place	2013 Kazan	K-1 500 m

Milica Novaković (née Starović; Serbian Cyrillic: Милица Новаковић, née Старовић; born 19 May 1988 in Novi Sad) is a Serbian female sprint canoer.

She represented Serbia at the 2016 and at the 2020 Summer Olympics. Starović won gold medal at the 2015 European Games in K-2 500 m with Dalma Ružičić-Benedek.
