= Anamaria Govorčinović =

Croatian canoeist (born 1997)

Personal information
- Born: 17 May 1997 (age 29)

Sport
- Sport: Canoe sprint
Medal record
Women's canoe sprint
Representing Croatia
World Championships
Silver medal – second place	2022 Dartmouth	K-1 500 m
Bronze medal – third place	2022 Dartmouth	K-1 1000 m
European Championships
Silver medal – second place	2021 Poznań	K-1 1000 m

Anamaria Govorčinović (born 17 May 1997) is a Croatian canoeist. She competed in the women's K-1 200 metres and the K-1 500 metres events at the 2020 Summer Olympics.
