= Jennifer Egan (canoeist) =

Irish sprint canoeist (born 1987)

Jennifer Egan-Simmons
Personal information
- Nationality: Irish
- Born: 22 March 1987 (age 39) Dublin, Ireland

Sport
- Country: Ireland
- Sport: Sprint kayak Canoe marathon
- Club: Salmon Leap Canoe Club
Medal record
Representing Ireland
Women's sprint kayak
World Championships
Silver medal – second place	2021 Copenhagen	K-1 5000 m
Bronze medal – third place	2018 Montemor-o-Velho	K-1 5000 m
Bronze medal – third place	2022 Dartmouth	K-1 5000 m
World Cup
Gold medal – first place	2016 Montemor-o-Velho	K-1 5000m
Gold medal – first place	2017 Montemor-o-Velho	K-1 5000m
Silver medal – second place	2010 Szeged	K-1 5000m
Silver medal – second place	2011 Racice	K-1 5000m
Silver medal – second place	2016 Racice	K-1 5000m
Silver medal – second place	2019 Poznan	K-1 5000m
Silver medal – second place	2021 Barnaul	K-1 5000m
Bronze medal – third place	2017 Belgrade	K-1 5000m
Bronze medal – third place	2019 Duisburg	K-1 5000m
Bronze medal – third place	2022 Poznan	K-1 5000m
European Championships
Bronze medal – third place	2015 Račice	K-1 5000 m
Women's canoe marathon
World Championships
Bronze medal – third place	2005 Perth	Junior K-1
Bronze medal – third place	2017 Pietermaritzburg	K-1
World Cup
Silver medal – second place	2005 Crestuma	Junior K1
Silver medal – second place	2017 Shaoxing	K1
Bronze medal – third place	2017 Shanghai	Short Course K1

Jennifer Egan-Simmons (born 22 March 1987) is an Irish sprint canoeist.

She participated at the 2018 ICF Canoe Sprint World Championships, winning a medal.
