= Linnea Stensils =

Swedish canoeist (born 1994)

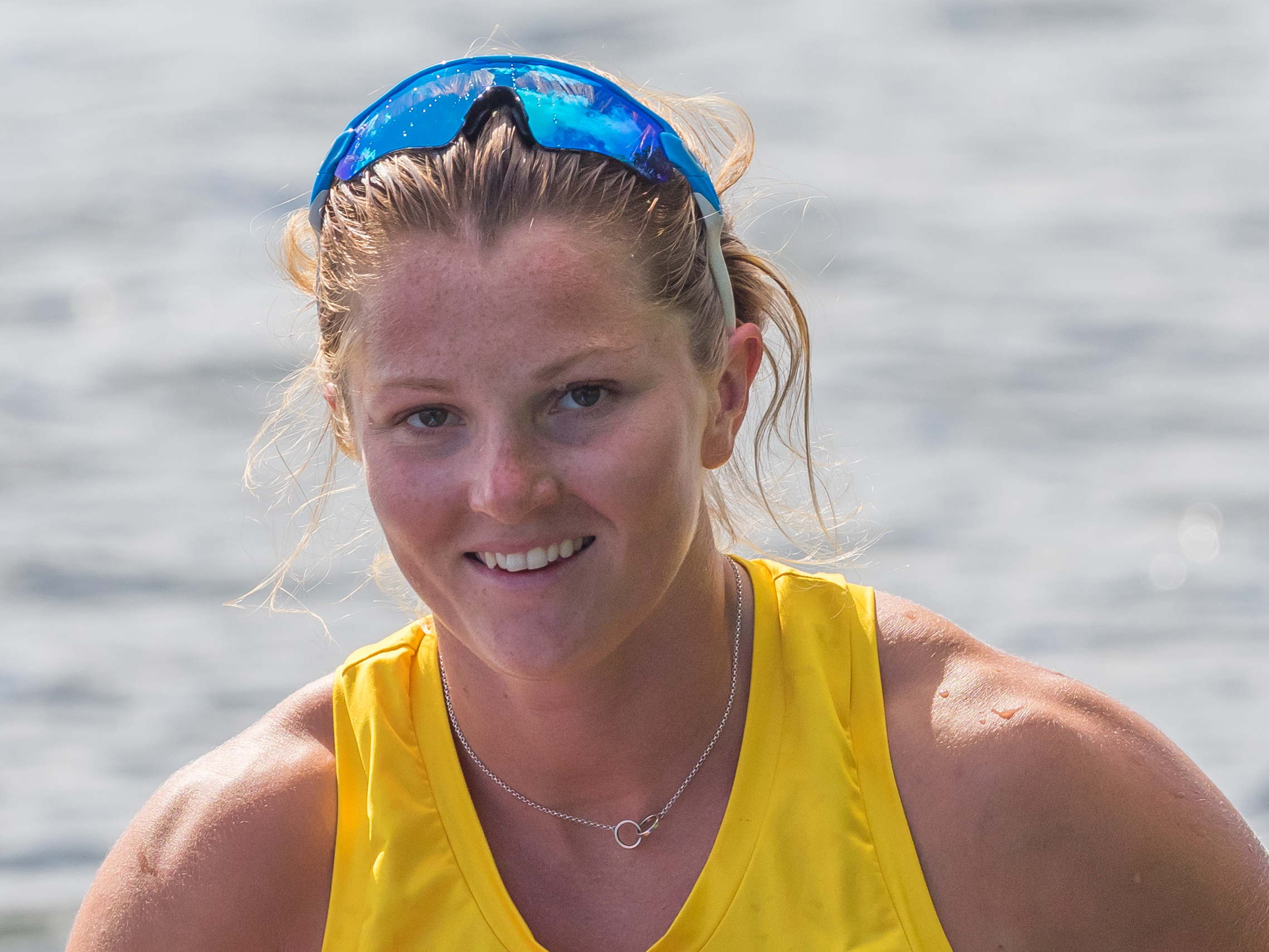

Personal information
- Nationality: Swedish
- Born: 8 March 1994 (age 32)
- Height: 1.78 m (5 ft 10 in)
- Weight: 68 kg (150 lb)

Sport
- Country: Sweden
- Sport: Canoe sprint
Medal record
Representing Sweden
World Championships
Bronze medal – third place	2018 Montemor-o-Velho	K-1 200 m

Linnea Stensils (born 8 March 1994) is a Swedish canoeist. She competed in the women's K-1 200 metres event at the 2016 Summer Olympics. She qualified to represent Sweden in the 2020 Summer Olympics.
