= Canoeing at the 2022 Asian Games =

Asian Games event

- Venue: Fuyang Water Sports Centre
- Dates: 30 September – 7 October 2023
- Competitors: 213 from 20 nations

The canoeing races at the 2022 Asian Games were held at Fuyang Water Sports Centre in Hangzhou, China, from 30 September to 7 October 2023.

== Schedule ==
H	Heats	S	Semifinal	F	Final

Event↓/Date →	30th Sat		1st Sun		2nd Mon	3rd Tue	4th Wed	5th Thu	6th Fri		7th Sat	
Slalom
Men's C-1								H	S	F		
Men's K-1								H			S	F
Women's C-1								H			S	F
Women's K-1								H	S	F		
Sprint
Men's C-1 1000 m	H	S			F							
Men's C-2 500 m	H	S			F							
Men's C-2 1000 m						F						
Men's K-1 1000 m	H	S			F							
Men's K-2 500 m	H	S			F							
Men's K-4 500 m			H	S		F						
Women's C-1 200 m			H	S		F						
Women's C-2 200 m						F						
Women's C-2 500 m					F							
Women's K-1 500 m			H	S		F						
Women's K-2 500 m	H	S			F							
Women's K-4 500 m						F						

== Medalists ==
=== Slalom ===
==== Men ====
Event	Gold	Silver	Bronze
C-1	Xie Yuancong; China	Anvar Klevleev; Uzbekistan	Alexandr Kulikov; Kazakhstan
K-1	Quan Xin; China	Yuuki Tanaka; Japan	Wu Shao-hsuan; Chinese Taipei

==== Women ====
Event	Gold	Silver	Bronze
C-1	Huang Juan; China	Anastassiya Ananyeva; Kazakhstan	Haruka Okazaki; Japan
K-1	Chang Chu-han; Chinese Taipei	Li Lu; China	Yekaterina Tarantseva; Kazakhstan

=== Sprint ===
==== Men ====
Event	Gold	Silver	Bronze
C-1 1000 m	Lai Kuan-chieh; Chinese Taipei	Vladlen Denisov; Uzbekistan	Timofey Yemelyanov; Kazakhstan
C-2 500 m	Kazakhstan; Sergey Yemelyanov; Timur Khaidarov	Japan; Masato Hashimoto; Ryo Naganuma	Iran; Adel Mojallali; Kia Eskandani
C-2 1000 m	Uzbekistan; Shokhmurod Kholmurodov; Nurislom Tukhtasin Ugli	Kazakhstan; Timofey Yemelyanov; Sergey Yemelyanov	India; Arjun Singh; Sunil Singh Salam
K-1 1000 m	Zhang Dong; China	Shakhriyor Makhkamov; Uzbekistan	Kirill Tubayev; Kazakhstan
K-2 500 m	China; Bu Tingkai; Wang Congkang	South Korea; Cho Gwang-hee; Jang Sang-won	Iran; Sepehr Saatchi; Peyman Ghavidel
K-4 500 m	China; Bu Tingkai; Wang Congkang; Zhang Dong; Dong Yi	South Korea; Cho Gwang-hee; Jo Hyun-hee; Jang Sang-won; Jeong Ju-hwan	Japan; Keiji Mizumoto; Akihiro Inoue; Taishi Tanada; Seiji Komatsu

==== Women ====
Event	Gold	Silver	Bronze
C-1 200 m	Lin Wenjun; China	Orasa Thiangkathok; Thailand	Mariya Brovkova; Kazakhstan
C-2 200 m	China; Shuai Changwen; Lin Wenjun	Kazakhstan; Margarita Torlopova; Ulyana Kisseleva	Uzbekistan; Shokhsanam Sherzodova; Nilufar Zokirova
C-2 500 m	China; Xu Shixiao; Sun Mengya	Kazakhstan; Rufina Iskakova; Mariya Brovkova	Thailand; Orasa Thiangkathok; Aphinya Sroichit
K-1 500 m	Li Dongyin; China	Stephenie Chen; Singapore	Hedieh Kazemi; Iran
K-2 500 m	China; Yin Mengdie; Wang Nan	Kazakhstan; Olga Shmelyova; Irina Podoinikova	Uzbekistan; Ekaterina Shubina; Arina Tanatmisheva
K-4 500 m	China; Li Dongyin; Yin Mengdie; Wang Nan; Sun Yuewen	South Korea; Choi Ran; Lee Han-sol; Jo Shin-young; Lee Ha-lin	Uzbekistan; Shakhrizoda Mavlonova; Arina Tanatmisheva; Ekaterina Shubina; Yuliya Borzova

== Medal table ==
Rank	Nation	Gold	Silver	Bronze	Total
1	China (CHN)	12	1	0	13
2	Chinese Taipei (TPE)	2	0	1	3
3	Kazakhstan (KAZ)	1	5	5	11
4	Uzbekistan (UZB)	1	3	3	7
5	South Korea (KOR)	0	3	0	3
6	Japan (JPN)	0	2	2	4
7	Thailand (THA)	0	1	1	2
8	Singapore (SGP)	0	1	0	1
9	Iran (IRI)	0	0	3	3
10	India (IND)	0	0	1	1
Totals (10 entries)		16	16	16	48

== Participating nations ==
A total of 213 athletes from 20 nations competed in canoeing at the 2022 Asian Games:

- Afghanistan (1)
- China (17)
- Chinese Taipei (5)
- Hong Kong (8)
- India (17)
- Indonesia (7)
- Iran (15)
- Iraq (3)
- Japan (15)
- Kazakhstan (24)
- Kyrgyzstan (4)
- Macau (4)
- Nepal (1)
- Philippines (2)
- Singapore (8)
- South Korea (16)
- Tajikistan (7)
- Thailand (26)
- Uzbekistan (22)
- Vietnam (11)
