= Canoeing at the 2026 Asian Games =

- Venue: Yahagigawa Canoe Slalom Course (slalom); Miyoshi Lake (sprint)
- Dates: 29 September–2 October 2026 (slalom); 23–26 September 2026 (sprint)
- Competitors: 203 from 18 nations

Canoeing competitions at the 2026 Asian Games consist of two main disciplines: canoe slalom, which will be held between 29 September and 2 October 2026 at the Yahagigawa Canoe Slalom Course, and canoe sprint, which is being held between 23 and 26 September 2026 at Miyoshi Lake.

== Schedule ==
The schedule is as follows:

TT	Time trial	H	Heats	QF	Quarterfinals	SF	Semifinals	F	Final

Slalom
Event↓/Date →	29th Tue	30th Wed		1st Thu		2nd Fri			
Men's C-1	H			SF	F				
Men's K-1	H	SF	F						
Men's kayak cross						TT	QF	SF	F
Women's C-1	H	SF	F						
Women's K-1	H			SF	F				
Women's kayak cross						TT	QF	SF	F

Sprint
Event↓/Date →	23rd Wed	24th Thu		25th Fri		26th Sat	
Men's events
Men's C-1 500 m				F			
Men's C-2 500 m		F					
Men's K-1 500 m		H				SF	F
Men's K-2 500 m	H			SF	F		
Men's K-4 500 m	H	SF	F				
Women's events
Women's C-1 200 m	H	SF	F				
Women's C-2 500 m	H			SF	F		
Women's K-1 500 m						F	
Women's K-2 500 m	H	SF	F				
Women's K-4 500 m				F			
Mixed events
Mixed C-2 500 m						F	
Mixed K-2 500 m		H				SF	F

== Medal summary ==
=== Medal table ===
* Host nation (Japan)

Rank	Nation	Gold	Silver	Bronze	Total
1	China	12	4	2	18
2	Uzbekistan	2	6	1	9
3	Japan*	2	2	2	6
4	South Korea	2	2	0	4
5	Chinese Taipei	0	2	1	3
6	Kazakhstan	0	1	8	9
7	Thailand	0	1	1	2
8	Indonesia	0	0	1	1
8	Iran	0	0	1	1
8	Vietnam	0	0	1	1
Totals (10 entries)		18	18	18	54

=== Medalists ===
==== Slalom ====
Event	Gold	Silver	Bronze
Men's C-1	Zhang Zhicheng; China	Wu Jung-cheng; Chinese Taipei	Piyanath Koetsuk; Thailand
Men's K-1	Hu Zhaoshan; China	Yuuki Tanaka; Japan	Alexandr Korobov; Kazakhstan
Men's Kayak cross	Yuuki Tanaka; Japan	Quan Xin; China	Hu Zhaoshan; China
Women's C-1	Huang Juan; China	Atcharaporn Duanglawa; Thailand	Anastassiya Ananyeva; Kazakhstan
Women's K-1	Kurumi Ito; Japan	Chen Lin; China	Yekaterina Tarantseva; Kazakhstan
Women's Kayak cross	Chen Lin; China	Chang Chu-han; Chinese Taipei	Xu Linxi; China

==== Sprint ====
===== Men's events =====
Event	Gold	Silver	Bronze
C-1 500 metres	Ji Bowen; China	Vladlen Denisov; Uzbekistan	Lai Kuan-chieh; Chinese Taipei
C-2 500 metres	China; Wu Shengyue; Ji Bowen	Uzbekistan; Artur Guliev; Vladlen Denisov	Kazakhstan; Sergey Yemelyanov; Timofey Yemelyanov
K-1 500 metres	Shakhriyor Makhkamov; Uzbekistan	Jang Sang-won; South Korea	Dmitriy Kholmogorov; Kazakhstan
K-2 500 metres	South Korea; Cho Gwang-hee; Kim Hyo-bin	Japan; Masaya Tanaka; Taishi Tanada	Iran; Ali Aghamirzaei; Peyman Ghavidel
K-4 500 metres	South Korea; Cho Gwang-hee; Kim Hyo-bin; Jang Sang-won; Choi Min-kyu	China; Liang Fengwei; Ding Shengkai; Chen Weiyang; Wang Jinwei	Japan; Masaya Tanaka; Akihiro Inoue; Ryuji Matsushiro; Yuito Sakai

===== Women's events =====
Event	Gold	Silver	Bronze
C-1 200 metres	Shohsanam Sherzodova; Uzbekistan	Shuai Changwen; China	Herlin Aprilin Lali; Indonesia
C-2 500 metres	China; Sun Mengya; Ma Yanan	Uzbekistan; Shohsanam Sherzodova; Nilufar Zokirova	Vietnam; Diệp Thị Hương; Nguyễn Thị Hương
K-1 500 metres	Wang Nan; China	Arina Tanatmisheva; Uzbekistan	Stella Sukhanova; Kazakhstan
K-2 500 metres	China; Yu Shimeng; Yin Mengdie	Kazakhstan; Olga Shmelyova; Tatyana Tokarnitskaya	Uzbekistan; Arina Tanatmisheva; Ekaterina Shubina
K-4 500 metres	China; Yu Shimeng; Yin Mengdie; Wang Nan; Shen Siyu	Uzbekistan; Milana Dushev-Yanich; Ekaterina Shubina; Arina Tanatmisheva; Shakhrizoda Mavlonova	Kazakhstan; Olga Shmelyova; Tatyana Tokarnitskaya; Stella Sukhanova; Evelina Kostenko

===== Mixed events =====
Event	Gold	Silver	Bronze
C-2 500 metres	China; Wu Shengyue; Ma Yanan	Uzbekistan; Vladlen Denisov; Nilufar Zokirova	Kazakhstan; Sergey Yemelyanov; Rufina Iskakova
K-2 500 metres	China; Li Chenhao; Zhang Luxi	South Korea; Choi Min-kyu; Seon Min-ju	Japan; Rin Fukuda; Akihiro Inoue

== Participating nations ==
- China (22)
- Chinese Taipei (10)
- Hong Kong (4)
- India (19)
- Indonesia (17)
- Iran (9)
- Japan (20)
- Kazakhstan (21)
- Kyrgyzstan (4)
- Mongolia (6)
- Nepal (2)
- North Korea (3)
- Singapore (10)
- South Korea (14)
- Tajikistan (2)
- Thailand (16)
- Uzbekistan (13)
- Vietnam (11)
