= Canoeing at the 2026 Asian Games – Women's K-4 500 metres =

Women's K-4 500 metres at the 2026 Asian Games
- Venue: Miyoshi Lake
- Date: 25 September 2026
- Competitors: 32 from 8 nations

Medalists
gold medal	Yu Shimeng; Yin Mengdie; Wang Nan; Shen Siyu	China
silver medal	Milana Dushev-Yanich; Ekaterina Shubina; Arina Tanatmisheva; Shakhrizoda Mavlonova	Uzbekistan
bronze medal	Olga Shmelyova; Tatyana Tokarnitskaya; Stella Sukhanova; Evelina Kostenko	Kazakhstan

The women's sprint K-4 (kayak four) 500 metres competition at the 2026 Asian Games was held on 25 September 2026.

== Schedule ==
All times are Japan Standard Time (UTC+09:00)

Date	Time	Event
Friday, 25 September 2026	11:40	Final

== Results ==
=== Final ===
Rank	Team	Time	Notes
1st place, gold medalist(s)	China (CHN); Yu Shimeng; Yin Mengdie; Wang Nan; Shen Siyu	1:33.784	
2nd place, silver medalist(s)	Uzbekistan (UZB); Milana Dushev-Yanich; Ekaterina Shubina; Arina Tanatmisheva; Shakhrizoda Mavlonova	1:36.561	
3rd place, bronze medalist(s)	Kazakhstan (KAZ); Olga Shmelyova; Tatyana Tokarnitskaya; Stella Sukhanova; Evelina Kostenko	1:37.005	
4	South Korea (KOR); Jo Shin-young; Kim Soh-ryun; Seon Min-ju; Han Sol-hee	1:37.134	
5	Japan (JPN); Maya Hosomi; Juri Urada; Rin Fukuda; Haruna Kobayashi	1:38.957	
6	Vietnam (VIE); Hoàng Thị Lâm; Đỗ Thị Thanh Thảo; Bùi Mai Hạnh; Hoàng Thị Hương	1:42.710	
7	Singapore (SGP); Grace Ng; Lim Kai Jing; Heng Kirsten Joan Yu Hsi; Georgia Ng	1:44.294	
8	India (IND); Khwairakpam Dhanamanjuri Devi; Pooja; Soniya Devi Phairembam; Parvathy Geetha	1:45.670	
