= 2023 ICF Canoe Sprint World Championships – Men's C-2 1000 metres =

Men's C-2 200 metres at the 2023 ICF Canoe Sprint World Championships
- Venue: Sportpark Duisburg
- Location: Duisburg, Germany
- Dates: 23–26 August
- Competitors: 34 from 17 nations
- Winning time: 3:34.565

Medalists
gold medal	Nicolae Craciun; Daniele Santini	Italy
silver medal	Moritz Adam; Nico Pickert	Germany
bronze medal	Ilie Sprîncean; Oleg Nuţă	Romania

The men's C-2 1000 metres competition at the 2023 ICF Canoe Sprint World Championships in Duisburg took place in Sportpark Duisburg.

== Schedule ==
The schedule is as follows:

Date	Time	Round
Wednesday 23 August 2023	16:10	Heats
Thursday 24 August 2023	15:45	Semifinals
Saturday 26 August 2023	10:40	Final B
Saturday 26 August 2023	11:14	Final A

== Results ==
=== Heats ===
The fastest boat in each heat advanced directly to the final.
The next six fastest boats in each heat advanced to the semifinal.

==== Heat 1 ====
Rank	Canoeist	Country	Time	Notes
1	Moritz Adam; Nico Pickert	Germany	3:41.682	QA
2	Kristóf Kollár; Daniel Fejes	Hungary	3:45.793	QS
3	Kacper Sieradzan; Adrian Klos	Poland	44.718	QS
4	Jiri Zalubil; Adam Rudolf	Czech Republic	3:55.025	QS
5	Rudiansyah Rudiansyah; Muhammad Burhan	Indonesia	4:11.250	QS
6	Ara Virabyan; Rade Pedich	Armenia	4:25.008	QS
7	Edwar Paredes; Luis Yasser Guerra	Venezuela	DNS	

==== Heat 2 ====
Rank	Canoeist	Country	Time	Notes
1	Pavlo Borsuk; Artem Chetvertak	Ukraine	3:51.730	QA
2	Eduard Strycek; Peter Kizek	Slovakia	3:51.736	QS
3	Pablo Crespo; Martín Jácome	Spain	3:51.811	QS
4	Nils Medins; Stanislavs Lescinskis	Latvia	4:07.515	QS
5	Sidali Belaidi; Mohamed Ali Merzougui	Algeria	4:28.847	QS
6	Mussa Chamaune; Joaquim Lobo	Mozambique	DNS	

==== Heat 3 ====
Rank	Canoeist	Country	Time	Notes
1	Nicolae Craciun; Daniele Santini	Italy	3:44.532	QA
2	Ilie Sprîncean; Oleg Nuţă	Romania	3:46.918	QS
3	Oleg Tarnovschi; Mihai Chihaia	Moldova	3:48.154	QS
4	Yu Yuebin; Yu Chenwei	China	3:48.407	QS
5	Arjun Singh; Sunil Singh Salam	India	3:49.484	QS
	Manuel Antonio; Benilson Sanda	Angola	DQ	

=== Semifinals ===
The fastest three boats advanced to the A final.
The next four fastest boats in each semi advanced to the final B.

==== Semifinal 1 ====
Rank	Canoeist	Country	Time	Notes
1	Yu Yuebin; Yu Chenwei	China	3:34.505	QA
2	Kristóf Kollár; Daniel Fejes	Hungary	3:35.143	QA
3	Pablo Crespo; Martín Jácome	Spain	3:35.253	QA
4	Oleg Tarnovschi; Mihai Chihaia	Moldova	3:36.583	QB
5	Jiri Zalubil; Adam Rudolf	Czech Republic	3:42.851	QB
6	Ara Virabyan; Rade Pedich	Armenia	4:01.791	QB
7	Sidali Belaidi; Mohamed Ali Merzougui	Algeria	4:16.566	QB

==== Semifinal 2 ====
Rank	Canoeist	Country	Time	Notes
1	Ilie Sprîncean; Oleg Nuţă	Romania	3:37.183	QA
2	Kacper Sieradzan; Adrian Klos	Poland	3:38.527	QA
3	Arjun Singh; Sunil Singh Salam	India	3:39.387	QA
4	Eduard Strycek; Peter Kizek	Slovakia	3:40.151	QB
5	Rudiansyah Rudiansyah; Muhammad Burhan	Indonesia	4:00.592	QB
6	Nils Medins; Stanislavs Lescinskis	Latvia	4:12.170	QB

=== Final B ===
Competitors in this final raced for positions 10 to 16.

Rank	Canoeist	Country	Time
1	Jiri Zalubil; Adam Rudolf	Czech Republic	3:41.066
2	Oleg Tarnovschi; Mihai Chihaia	Moldova	3:44.404
3	Eduard Strycek; Peter Kizek	Slovakia	3:44.982
4	Nils Medins; Stanislavs Lescinskis	Latvia	3:55.305
5	Rudiansyah Rudiansyah; Muhammad Burhan	Indonesia	3:56.182
6	Ara Virabyan; Rade Pedich	Armenia	4:09.196
7	Sidali Belaidi; Mohamed Ali Merzougui	Algeria	4:12.447

==== Final A ====
Competitors raced for positions 1 to 9, with medals going to the top three.

Rank	Canoeist	Country	Time
1st place, gold medalist(s)	Nicolae Craciun; Daniele Santini	Italy	3:34.565
2nd place, silver medalist(s)	Moritz Adam; Nico Pickert	Germany	3:35.296
3rd place, bronze medalist(s)	Ilie Sprîncean; Oleg Nuţă	Romania	3:36.490
4	Pablo Crespo; Martín Jácome	Spain	3:36.530
5	Kristóf Kollár; Daniel Fejes	Hungary	3:36.932
6	Yu Yuebin; Yu Chenwei	China	3:37.935
7	Kacper Sieradzan; Adrian Klos	Poland	3:42.615
8	Pavlo Borsuk; Artem Chetvertak	Ukraine	3:48.993
9	Arjun Singh; Sunil Singh Salam	India	3:49.524
