= 2025 ICF Canoe Sprint World Championships – Women's K-4 500 metres =

Women's K-4 500 metres at the 2025 ICF Canoe Sprint World Championships
- Venue: Idroscalo Regatta Course
- Location: Milan, Italy
- Dates: 20–22 August
- Competitors: 96 from 24 nations
- Winning time: 1:32.58

Medalists
gold medal	Sara Ouzande; Lucía Val; Estefanía Fernández; Bárbara Pardo	Spain
silver medal	Li Dongyin; Yu Shimeng; Wang Nan; Wang Ji	China
bronze medal	Marharyta Tkachova; Uladzislava Skryhanava; Ina Sauchuk; Nadzeya Kushner	Individual Neutral Athletes

The women's K-4 500 metres competition at the 2025 ICF Canoe Sprint World Championships in Milan took place in Idroscalo Regatta Course.

== Schedule ==
The schedule is as follows:

Date	Time	Round
Wednesday 20 August 2025	09:42	Heats
Thursday 21 August 2025	14:00	Semifinals
Friday 22 August 2025	14:37	Final B
Friday 22 August 2025	15:18	Final A

== Results ==
=== Heats ===
The fastest boat in each heat advanced directly to the final (FA). The next six fastest boats in each heat advanced to the semifinal (QS).

==== Heat 1 ====
Rank	Canoeist	Country	Time	Notes
1	Kailey Harlen; Natalia Drobot; Alexandra Clarke; Claudia Bailey	Australia	1:35.66	FA
2	Paulina Paszek; Katharina Diederichs; Pauline Jagsch; Hannah Spielhagen	Germany	1:35.92	QS
3	Frederikke Hauge Matthiesen; Sara Milthers; Katrine Jensen; Bolette Nyvang Iversen	Denmark	1:37.66	QS
4	Emily Lewis; Deborah Kerr; Kristina Armstrong; Zoe Clark	Great Britain	1:37.68	QS
5	Dina Bacelj; Anastazija Bajuk; Marija Dostanić; Dunja Stanojev	Serbia	1:38.28	QS
6	Magdalena Garro; Brenda Rojas; Candelaria Sequeira; Lucía Dalto	Argentina	1:38.77	QS
7	Ivanna Dyachenko; Diana Rybak; Snizhana Stalinova; Hanna Pavlova	Ukraine	1:41.54	QS
8	Pooja Pooja; Garima Garima; Parvathy Geetha; Binita Chanu Oinam	India	1:54.29	

==== Heat 2 ====
Rank	Canoeist	Country	Time	Notes
1	Marharyta Tkachova; Uladzislava Skryhanava; Ina Sauchuk; Nadzeya Kushner	Individual Neutral Athletes	1:33.74	FA
2	Réka Bugár; Sofia Bergendi; Hana Gavorova; Bianka Sidová	Slovakia	1:34.67	QS
3	Sara Ouzande; Lucía Val; Estefanía Fernández; Bárbara Pardo	Spain	1:35.17	QS
4	Li Dongyin; Yu Shimeng; Wang Nan; Wang Ji	China	1:36.14	QS
5	Isabel Aburto Romero; Karina Alanís; Beatriz Briones; Maricela Montemayor	Mexico	1:37.45	QS
6	Hermien Peters; Lize Broekx; Amber Van Broekhoven; Anastasia Okunkova	Belgium	1:37.55	QS
7	Teresa Portela; Ana Brito; Ana Rodrigues; Inês Costa	Portugal	1:37.73	QS
8	Irene Bellan; Meshua Marigo; Agata Fantini; Sara Mrzygłód	Italy	1:38.16	

==== Heat 3 ====
Rank	Canoeist	Country	Time	Notes
1	Lisa Carrington; Alicia Hoskin; Tara Vaughan; Lucy Matehaere	New Zealand	1:34.65	FA
2	Karolina Naja; Sandra Ostrowska; Julia Olszewska; Adrianna Kąkol	Poland	1:35.62	QS
3	Sára Fojt; Noémi Pupp; Laura Ujfalvi; Emese Kőhalmi	Hungary	1:36.79	QS
4	Maria Virik; Anna Margrete Sletsjøe; Elsa-Marie Stensholt; Kristine Strand Amundsen	Norway	1:37.23	QS
5	Barbora Betlachová; Kateřina Zárubová; Štěpánka Sobíšková; Eliška Betlachová	Czech Republic	1:38.58	QS
6	Anastasiia Ivanova; Natalia Podolskaya; Elena Mironchenko; Olesia Kozeeva	Individual Neutral Athletes	1:38.58	QS
7	Callie Loch; Riley Melanson; Chloe Bryer; Toshka Besharah	Canada	1:40.38	QS
8	Jo Shin-young; Seon Min-ju; Choi Ran; Kim So-hyun	South Korea	1:41.74	

=== Semifinals ===
The fastest three boats in each semi advanced to the A final. The next four fastest boats in each semi and best 8th advanced to the final B.

==== Semifinal 1 ====
Rank	Canoeist	Country	Time	Notes
1	Sara Ouzande; Lucía Val; Estefanía Fernández; Bárbara Pardo	Spain	1:34.09	FA
2	Li Dongyin; Yu Shimeng; Wang Nan; Wang Ji	China	1:34.75	FA
3	Maria Virik; Anna Margrete Sletsjøe; Elsa-Marie Stensholt; Kristine Strand Amundsen	Norway	1:34.80	FA
4	Karolina Naja; Sandra Ostrowska; Julia Olszewska; Adrianna Kąkol	Poland	1:35.92	FB
5	Magdalena Garro; Brenda Rojas; Candelaria Sequeira; Lucía Dalto	Argentina	1:36.09	FB
6	Frederikke Hauge Matthiesen; Sara Milthers; Katrine Jensen; Bolette Nyvang Iversen	Denmark	1:37.09	FB
7	Dina Bacelj; Anastazija Bajuk; Marija Dostanić; Dunja Stanojev	Serbia	1:37.64	FB
8	Hermien Peters; Lize Broekx; Amber Van Broekhoven; Anastasia Okunkova	Belgium	1:38.17	
9	Callie Loch; Riley Melanson; Chloe Bryer; Toshka Besharah	Canada	1:40.29	

==== Semifinal 2 ====
Rank	Canoeist	Country	Time	Notes
1	Sára Fojt; Noémi Pupp; Laura Ujfalvi; Emese Kőhalmi	Hungary	1:34.07	FA
2	Emily Lewis; Deborah Kerr; Kristina Armstrong; Zoe Clark	Great Britain	1:34.54	FA
3	Réka Bugár; Sofia Bergendi; Hana Gavorova; Bianka Sidová	Slovakia	1:34.60	FA
4	Paulina Paszek; Katharina Diederichs; Pauline Jagsch; Hannah Spielhagen	Germany	1:34.79	FB
5	Teresa Portela; Ana Brito; Ana Rodrigues; Inês Costa	Portugal	1:36.27	FB
6	Isabel Aburto Romero; Karina Alanís; Beatriz Briones; Maricela Montemayor	Mexico	1:36.48	FB
7	Barbora Betlachová; Kateřina Zárubová; Štěpánka Sobíšková; Eliška Betlachová	Czech Republic	1:36.68	FB
8	Ivanna Dyachenko; Diana Rybak; Snizhana Stalinova; Hanna Pavlova	Ukraine	1:37.18	fB
9	Anastasiia Ivanova; Natalia Podolskaya; Elena Mironchenko; Olesia Kozeeva	Individual Neutral Athletes	1:38.01	

=== Finals ===
==== Final B ====
Competitors in this final raced for positions 10 to 18.

Rank	Canoeist	Country	Time	Notes
1	Magdalena Garro; Brenda Rojas; Candelaria Sequeira; Lucía Dalto	Argentina	1:35.58	
2	Paulina Paszek; Katharina Diederichs; Pauline Jagsch; Hannah Spielhagen	Germany	1:35.63	
3	Karolina Naja; Sandra Ostrowska; Julia Olszewska; Adrianna Kąkol	Poland	1:35.65	
4	Frederikke Hauge Matthiesen; Sara Milthers; Katrine Jensen; Bolette Nyvang Iversen	Denmark	1:35.90	
5	Teresa Portela; Ana Brito; Ana Rodrigues; Inês Costa	Portugal	1:36.99	
6	Isabel Aburto Romero; Karina Alanís; Beatriz Briones; Maricela Montemayor	Mexico	1:37.01	
7	Ivanna Dyachenko; Diana Rybak; Snizhana Stalinova; Hanna Pavlova	Ukraine	1:37.71	
8	Barbora Betlachová; Kateřina Zárubová; Štěpánka Sobíšková; Eliška Betlachová	Czech Republic	1:37.72	
9	Dina Bacelj; Anastazija Bajuk; Marija Dostanić; Dunja Stanojev	Serbia	1:37.89	

==== Final A ====
Competitors raced for positions 1 to 9, with medals going to the top three.

Rank	Canoeist	Country	Time	Notes
1st place, gold medalist(s)	Sara Ouzande; Lucía Val; Estefanía Fernández; Bárbara Pardo	Spain	1:32.58	
2nd place, silver medalist(s)	Li Dongyin; Yu Shimeng; Wang Nan; Wang Ji	China	1:32.68	
3rd place, bronze medalist(s)	Marharyta Tkachova; Uladzislava Skryhanava; Ina Sauchuk; Nadzeya Kushner	Individual Neutral Athletes	1:32.80	
4	Lisa Carrington; Alicia Hoskin; Tara Vaughan; Lucy Matehaere	New Zealand	1:32.98	
5	Réka Bugár; Sofia Bergendi; Hana Gavorova; Bianka Sidová	Slovakia	1:34.09	
6	Maria Virik; Anna Margrete Sletsjøe; Elsa-Marie Stensholt; Kristine Strand Amundsen	Norway	1:34.12	
7	Sára Fojt; Noémi Pupp; Laura Ujfalvi; Emese Kőhalmi	Hungary	1:34.26	
8	Kailey Harlen; Natalia Drobot; Alexandra Clarke; Claudia Bailey	Australia	1:34.82	
9	Emily Lewis; Deborah Kerr; Kristina Armstrong; Zoe Clark	Great Britain	1:35.80	
