= 2025 Asian Canoe Sprint Championships =

Canoeing competition in Tokyo, Japan

- Host city: Nanchang, China
- Dates: 8–10 May 2025
- Main venue: Yaohu International Aquatic Sports Center

The 2025 Asian Canoe Sprint Championships were the 20th Asian Canoe Sprint Championships and took place from 8 to 10 May 2025 in Yaohu International Aquatic Sports Center, Nanchang, China.

== Medal summary ==
=== Men ===
Event	Gold	Silver	Bronze
C-1 200 m	Yu Yuebin; China	Viktor Stepanov; Kazakhstan	Ryo Naganuma; Japan
C-1 500 m	Wu Shengyue; China	Mukhammadali Mirismanov; Uzbekistan	Lai Kuan-chieh; Chinese Taipei
C-1 1000 m	Wu Shengyue; China	Mohammad Nabi Rezaei; Iran	Lai Kuan-chieh; Chinese Taipei
C-2 500 m	China; Yu Yuebin; Yu Chenwei	Kazakhstan; Sergey Yemelyanov; Polat Turebekov	Uzbekistan; Kamoliddin Rakhmatullaev; Azimjon Sotiboldiev
C-2 1000 m	China; Gao Yutao; Gao Yukun	Uzbekistan; Mukhammadali Mirismanov; Diyorbek Mamatkulov	Tajikistan; Shahriyor Daminov; Amirjon Bobojonov
K-1 200 m	Erlan Sultangaziev; Kyrgyzstan	Praison Buasamrong; Thailand	Liang Fengwei; China
K-1 500 m	Zhang Dong; China	Bekarys Ramatulla; Kazakhstan	Ali Aghamirzaei; Iran
K-1 1000 m	Zhang Dong; China	Ali Aghamirzaei; Iran	Oleksandr Zarubin; Uzbekistan
K-2 500 m	Iran; Ali Aghamirzaei; Peyman Ghavidel	Japan; Mizuki Aoki; Haruyuki Tomitsuka	China; Wang Congkang; Lin Laijie
K-4 500 m	China; Bu Tingkai; Liang Fengwei; Wang Chi; Zhang Dong	South Korea; Cho Gwang-hee; Choi Min-kyu; Jang Sang-won; Jeong Ju-hwan	Japan; Masaya Tanaka; Ryuji Matsushiro; Akihiro Inoue; Taishi Tanada

=== Women ===
Event	Gold	Silver	Bronze
C-1 200 m	Sun Mengya; China	Nguyễn Hồng Thái; Vietnam	O Su-rim; North Korea
C-1 500 m	Ma Yanan; China	Diệp Thị Hương; Vietnam	Mariya Brovkova; Kazakhstan
C-2 200 m	Indonesia; Herlin Aprilin Lali; Sella Monim	China; Li Shuqi; Xue Lina	Vietnam; Nguyễn Thị Hương; Diệp Thị Hương
C-2 500 m	China; Xu Shixiao; Sun Mengya	Vietnam; Nguyễn Thị Hương; Diệp Thị Hương	Indonesia; Herlin Aprilin Lali; Sella Monim
C-2 1000 m	China; Teng Anshuo; Jiang Xina	Vietnam; Nguyễn Hồng Thái; Nguyễn Thị Hương	North Korea; Cha Un-yong; Jong Ye-song
K-1 200 m	Wang Nan; China	Stephenie Chen; Singapore	Olga Shmelyova; Kazakhstan
K-1 500 m	Wang Nan; China	Arina Tanatmisheva; Uzbekistan	Stephenie Chen; Singapore
K-1 1000 m	Chen Lingya; China	Stella Sukhanova; Kazakhstan	Narjes Kargarpour; Iran
K-2 500 m	Kazakhstan; Olga Shmelyova; Irina Podoinikova	China; Deng Meiyi; Huang Jieyi	Japan; Maya Hosomi; Juri Urada
K-4 500 m	Kazakhstan; Olga Shmelyova; Irina Podoinikova; Stella Sukhanova; Tatyana Tokarnitskaya	China; Deng Meiyi; Luo Sumin; Huang Jieyi; Wang Liujie	Japan; Maya Hosomi; Sara Terui; Juri Urada; Yui Taniguchi

=== Mixed ===
Event	Gold	Silver	Bronze
C-2 500 m	Kazakhstan; Sergey Yemelyanov; Rufina Iskakova	China; Ding Liu; Liu Meisi	Uzbekistan; Kamoliddin Rakhmatullaev; Zarina Rustamova
C-4 500 m	Vietnam; Phạm Hồng Quân; Bùi Thị Yến; Ma Thị Thủy; Hiên Năm	China; Lei Linshan; Li Qi; Dong Jie; Zuo Youmin	Kazakhstan; Sergey Yemelyanov; Rufina Iskakova; Margarita Torlopova; Timofey Yemelyanov
K-2 500 m	Kazakhstan; Olga Shmelyova; Artyom Terechshenko	China; Zhang Wen; Feng Yazhen	South Korea; Jung Won-june; Byun Eun-jeong
K-4 500 m	China; Zhang Yang; Yang Siyi; Zhang Wen; Feng Yazhen	Japan; Mizuki Aoki; Juri Urada; Yui Taniguchi; Ryuji Matsushiro	Kazakhstan; Olga Shmelyova; Tatyana Tokarnitskaya; Zhakhongir Zhamedov; Kirill Tubayev

== Medal table ==
Rank	Nation	Gold	Silver	Bronze	Total
1	China	16	6	2	24
2	Kazakhstan	4	4	4	12
3	Vietnam	1	4	1	6
4	Iran	1	2	2	5
5	Indonesia	1	0	1	2
6	Kyrgyzstan	1	0	0	1
7	Uzbekistan	0	3	3	6
8	Japan	0	2	4	6
9	Singapore	0	1	1	2
9	South Korea	0	1	1	2
11	Thailand	0	1	0	1
12	Chinese Taipei	0	0	2	2
12	North Korea	0	0	2	2
14	Tajikistan	0	0	1	1
Totals (14 entries)		24	24	24	72
