= Canoeing at the 2026 Asian Games – Women's slalom C-1 =

Women's C-1 at the 2026 Asian Games
- Venue: Yahagigawa Canoe Slalom Course
- Date: 29–30 September 2026
- Competitors: 10 from 7 nations

Medalists
gold medal	Huang Juan	China
silver medal	Atcharaporn Duanglawa	Thailand
bronze medal	Anastassiya Ananyeva	Kazakhstan

The women's slalom C-1 (canoe single) competition at the 2026 Asian Games was held from 29 to 30 September 2026 at the Yahagigawa Canoe Slalom Course in Toyota, Aichi Prefecture, Japan. Each NOC could enter two athletes but only one of them could advance to the final. Huang Juan won the gold medal, Atcharaporn Duanglawa took silver and Anastassiya Ananyeva the bronze.

== Schedule ==
All times are Japan Standard Time (UTC+09:00)

Date	Time	Event
Tuesday, 29 September 2026	11:20	Heats
Wednesday, 30 September 2026	11:30	Semifinal
Wednesday, 30 September 2026	14:06	Final

== Results ==
=== Heats ===
Rank	Athlete	Time	Pen.	Total
1	Huang Juan (CHN)	117.57	4	121.57
2	Haruka Okazaki (JPN)	119.83	2	121.83
3	Aki Yazawa (JPN)	121.13	6	127.13
4	Anastassiya Ananyeva (KAZ)	124.71	4	128.71
5	Atcharaporn Duanglawa (THA)	136.75	4	140.75
6	Chung Yu-han (TPE)	126.28	56	182.28
7	Pallavi Jagtap (IND)	166.20	58	224.20
8	Putu Santhi (INA)	134.57	154	288.57
9	Rina Sen (IND)	176.72	166	342.72
10	Jaruwan Niamthong (THA)			DNF

Progression system: 1 to 10 advanced to the semifinal, the rest were eliminated.

=== Semifinal ===
Rank	Athlete	Time	Pen.	Total
1	Huang Juan (CHN)	115.96	2	117.96
2	Atcharaporn Duanglawa (THA)	120.51	2	122.51
3	Anastassiya Ananyeva (KAZ)	121.77	8	129.77
4	Chung Yu-han (TPE)	129.95	6	135.95
5	Aki Yazawa (JPN)	127.53	10	137.53
6	Haruka Okazaki (JPN)	137.87	6	143.87
7	Putu Santhi (INA)	156.47	4	160.47
8	Pallavi Jagtap (IND)	203.77	8	211.77
9	Rina Sen (IND)	205.99	64	269.99
10	Jaruwan Niamthong (THA)			DNF

Progression system: 1 to 7 advanced to the final (limited to one athlete per NOC), the rest were eliminated.

=== Final ===
Rank	Athlete	Time	Pen.	Total
1st place, gold medalist(s)	Huang Juan (CHN)	112.84	2	114.84
2nd place, silver medalist(s)	Atcharaporn Duanglawa (THA)	121.85	4	125.85
3rd place, bronze medalist(s)	Anastassiya Ananyeva (KAZ)	121.32	6	127.32
4	Aki Yazawa (JPN)	128.25	0	128.25
5	Chung Yu-han (TPE)	129.36	4	133.36
6	Putu Santhi (INA)	145.40	54	199.40
7	Pallavi Jagtap (IND)			DSQ
