= Yu Shimeng =

Chinese canoeist (born 1999)

Personal information
- Born: 15 October 1999 (age 26) Zhejiang, China

Sport
- Country: China
- Sport: Canoe sprint
- Event: K–2 500, K–4 500
Medal record
Women's canoe sprint
Representing China
World Championships
| Gold medal – first place | 2026 Poznań | K-4 500 m |
| Silver medal – second place | 2025 Milan | K-4 500 m |
| Silver medal – second place | 2026 Poznań | K-2 500 m |
Asian Games
| Gold medal – first place | 2026 Aichi–Nagoya | K-2 500 m |
| Gold medal – first place | 2026 Aichi–Nagoya | K-4 500 m |

Yu Shimeng (Chinese: 俞诗梦, born 15 October 1999) is a Chinese sprint canoeist. She represented China at the 2024 Summer Olympics.

== Career ==
In April 2024, Yu competed at the 2024 Asian Canoe Sprint Championships and won a gold medal in the K-2 500 metres, along with Chen Yule. As a result, they qualified for the 2024 Summer Olympics.

In April 2026, she competed at the 2026 Asian Canoe Sprint Championships and won a gold medal in the K-4 500 metres, along with Yin Mengdie, Wang Nan and Shen Siyu. In August 2026, she competed at the 2026 ICF Canoe Sprint World Championships and won a gold medal in the K-4 500 metres, with a time of 1:38.67. This marked the first time China won gold in the event at the ICF Canoe Sprint World Championships.
