= Canoeing at the 2026 Asian Games – Men's slalom kayak cross =

Men's kayak cross at the 2026 Asian Games
- Venue: Yahagigawa Canoe Slalom Course
- Date: 2 October 2026
- Competitors: 20 from 11 nations

Medalists
gold medal	Yuuki Tanaka	Japan
silver medal	Quan Xin	China
bronze medal	Hu Zhaoshan	China

The men's slalom kayak cross competition at the 2026 Asian Games was held on 2 October 2026 at the Yahagigawa Canoe Slalom Course in Toyota, Aichi Prefecture, Japan. This was the inaugural appearance of the kayak cross event at the Asian Games. Yuuki Tanaka won the gold medal, Quan Xin took silver and Hu Zhaoshan the bronze.

== Competition format ==
The kayak cross event began with a time trial to determine each canoeist's seeding for the quarterfinals. The top 16 canoeists advanced to the quarterfinals.

The quarterfinals featured four races with four competitors each, from which the top two advanced to the semifinals. The two semifinal races were contested by four canoeists each; the top two in each advanced to the final, while the third and fourth placed canoeists competed in the small final.

== Schedule ==
All times are Japan Standard Time (UTC+09:00)

Date	Time	Event
Friday, 2 October 2026	11:30	Time trial
Friday, 2 October 2026	13:46	Quarterfinals
Friday, 2 October 2026	14:22	Semifinals
Friday, 2 October 2026	14:54	Small final
Friday, 2 October 2026	15:14	Final

== Results ==
=== Time trial ===
Rank	Bib	Athlete	Time	Notes
1	1	Hu Zhaoshan (CHN)	67.17	Q
2	6	Djanibek Temirgaliev (UZB)	70.99	Q
3	10	Kazuya Adachi (JPN)	71.91	Q
4	4	Alexandr Korobov (KAZ)	72.94	Q
5	11	Vladislav Ryabko (KAZ)	73.34	Q
6	8	Yuuki Tanaka (JPN)	73.61	Q
7	7	Liao Li-hong (TPE)	76.37	Q
8	14	Baek Seo-jin (KOR)	79.04	Q
9	5	Pradhyumna Singh Rathod (IND)	79.85	Q
10	9	Wu Jung-cheng (TPE)	80.67	Q
11	12	Piyanath Koetsuk (THA)	81.01	Q
12	17	Krisna Septiana (INA)	82.51	Q
13	18	Aashish Rana Magar (NEP)	86.55	Q
14	15	Bijaya Majhi (NEP)	88.34	Q
15	19	Lee Kwon-hee (KOR)	96.82	Q
16	2	Quan Xin (CHN)	69.21	Q, FLT (5)
17	13	Janyawut Mangjit (THA)	77.98	FLT (4)
18	20	Hitesh Kewat (IND)	83.90	FLT (S)
19	16	Odjargal Batsukh (MGL)	77.28	FLT (S, R, 3, 5, 7)
—	3	Pavel Eygel (UZB)		DNS

Progression system: 1 to 16 advanced to the quarterfinals, the rest were eliminated.

=== Quarterfinals ===
Proceed to Semifinals
Eliminated

Quarterfinal 1
Rank	Bib	Athlete
1	16	Quan Xin (CHN)
2	1	Hu Zhaoshan (CHN)
3	8	Baek Seo-jin (KOR)
4	12	Krisna Septiana (INA)

Quarterfinal 2
Rank	Bib	Athlete
1	4	Alexandr Korobov (KAZ)
2	5	Vladislav Ryabko (KAZ)
3	13	Aashish Rana Magar (NEP)
4	9	Pradhyumna Singh Rathod (IND)

Quarterfinal 3
Rank	Bib	Athlete
1	3	Kazuya Adachi (JPN)
2	6	Yuuki Tanaka (JPN)
3	10	Wu Jung-cheng (TPE)
4	14	Bijaya Majhi (NEP)

Quarterfinal 4
Rank	Bib	Athlete
1	2	Djanibek Temirgaliev (UZB)
2	11	Piyanath Koetsuk (THA)
3	7	Liao Li-hong (TPE)
4	15	Lee Kwon-hee (KOR)

=== Semifinals ===
Proceed to Finals
Proceed to Small Final

Semifinal 1
Rank	Bib	Athlete
1	16	Quan Xin (CHN)
2	1	Hu Zhaoshan (CHN)
3	5	Vladislav Ryabko (KAZ)
4	4	Alexandr Korobov (KAZ)

Semifinal 2
Rank	Bib	Athlete
1	6	Yuuki Tanaka (JPN)
2	3	Kazuya Adachi (JPN)
3	2	Djanibek Temirgaliev (UZB)
4	11	Piyanath Koetsuk (THA)

=== Finals ===
Final
Rank	Bib	Athlete
1st place, gold medalist(s)	6	Yuuki Tanaka (JPN)
2nd place, silver medalist(s)	16	Quan Xin (CHN)
3rd place, bronze medalist(s)	1	Hu Zhaoshan (CHN)
4	3	Kazuya Adachi (JPN)

Small Final
Rank	Bib	Athlete
1	5	Vladislav Ryabko (KAZ)
2	2	Djanibek Temirgaliev (UZB)
3	11	Piyanath Koetsuk (THA)
4	4	Alexandr Korobov (KAZ)

=== Final ranking ===
Rank	Bib	Athlete
1st place, gold medalist(s)	6	Yuuki Tanaka (JPN)
2nd place, silver medalist(s)	16	Quan Xin (CHN)
3rd place, bronze medalist(s)	1	Hu Zhaoshan (CHN)
4	3	Kazuya Adachi (JPN)
5	5	Vladislav Ryabko (KAZ)
6	2	Djanibek Temirgaliev (UZB)
7	11	Piyanath Koetsuk (THA)
8	4	Alexandr Korobov (KAZ)
9	7	Liao Li-hong (TPE)
10	14	Baek Seo-jin (KOR)
11	9	Wu Jung-cheng (TPE)
12	18	Aashish Rana Magar (NEP)
13	5	Pradhyumna Singh Rathod (IND)
14	17	Krisna Septiana (INA)
15	15	Bijaya Majhi (NEP)
16	19	Lee Kwon-hee (KOR)
17	13	Janyawut Mangjit (THA)
18	20	Hitesh Kewat (IND)
19	16	Odjargal Batsukh (MGL)
