= Canoeing at the 2018 Asian Games – Men's K-2 1000 metres =

Men's K-2 1000 metres at the 2018 Asian Games
- Venue: Jakabaring Lake
- Date: 29–30 August 2018
- Competitors: 22 from 11 nations

Medalists
gold medal	Zhang Dong; Bu Tingkai	China
silver medal	Ilya Golendov; Andrey Yerguchyov	Kazakhstan
bronze medal	Shakhriyor Makhkamov; Shokhrukhbek Azamov	Uzbekistan

The men's sprint K-2 (kayak double) 1000 metres competition at the 2018 Asian Games was held from 29 to 30 August 2018.

== Schedule ==
All times are Western Indonesia Time (UTC+07:00)

Date	Time	Event
Wednesday, 29 August 2018	10:30	Heats
Wednesday, 29 August 2018	17:40	Semifinal
Thursday, 30 August 2018	10:10	Final

== Results ==
=== Heats ===
- Qualification: 1–3 → Final (QF), Rest → Semifinal (QS)

==== Heat 1 ====
Rank	Team	Time	Notes
1	Kazakhstan (KAZ); Ilya Golendov; Andrey Yerguchyov	3:27.907	QF
2	Singapore (SGP); Lucas Teo; Brandon Ooi	3:35.287	QF
3	Japan (JPN); Keiji Mizumoto; Seiji Komatsu	3:41.327	QF
4	Indonesia (INA); Andri Sugiarto; Erik Saf	3:44.905	QS
5	Tajikistan (TJK); Abdusattor Gafurov; Zohirjon Nabiev	3:52.381	QS
6	India (IND); L. Naocha Singh; A. Chingching Singh	3:53.449	QS

==== Heat 2 ====
Rank	Team	Time	Notes
1	China (CHN); Zhang Dong; Bu Tingkai	3:28.074	QF
2	Uzbekistan (UZB); Shakhriyor Makhkamov; Shokhrukhbek Azamov	3:31.572	QF
3	Iran (IRI); Ali Aghamirzaei; Amin Boudaghi	3:38.202	QF
4	South Korea (KOR); Kim Ji-hwan; Park Ju-hyeon	3:45.828	QS
5	Hong Kong (HKG); Cheung Tsz Chung; Mok Yuen Fung	4:13.276	QS

=== Semifinal ===
- Qualification: 1–3 → Final (QF)

Rank	Team	Time	Notes
1	India (IND); L. Naocha Singh; A. Chingching Singh	3:35.613	QF
2	South Korea (KOR); Kim Ji-hwan; Park Ju-hyeon	3:37.053	QF
3	Indonesia (INA); Andri Sugiarto; Erik Saf	3:38.309	QF
4	Hong Kong (HKG); Cheung Tsz Chung; Mok Yuen Fung	3:39.927	
5	Tajikistan (TJK); Abdusattor Gafurov; Zohirjon Nabiev	3:47.529	

=== Final ===
Rank	Team	Time
1st place, gold medalist(s)	China (CHN); Zhang Dong; Bu Tingkai	3:23.601
2nd place, silver medalist(s)	Kazakhstan (KAZ); Ilya Golendov; Andrey Yerguchyov	3:23.815
3rd place, bronze medalist(s)	Uzbekistan (UZB); Shakhriyor Makhkamov; Shokhrukhbek Azamov	3:26.273
4	Singapore (SGP); Lucas Teo; Brandon Ooi	3:31.123
5	Japan (JPN); Keiji Mizumoto; Seiji Komatsu	3:35.207
6	Iran (IRI); Ali Aghamirzaei; Amin Boudaghi	3:35.339
7	South Korea (KOR); Kim Ji-hwan; Park Ju-hyeon	3:37.127
8	Indonesia (INA); Andri Sugiarto; Erik Saf	3:46.437
9	India (IND); L. Naocha Singh; A. Chingching Singh	3:48.627
