= Shen Siyu =

Chinese canoeist (born 2005)

Personal information
- Born: 25 November 2005 (age 20)

Sport
- Country: China
- Sport: Canoe sprint
- Event: K–4 500
Medal record
Women's canoe sprint
Representing China
World Championships
Gold medal – first place	2026 Poznań	K-4 500 m
Asian Games
Gold medal – first place	2026 Aichi–Nagoya	K-4 500 m

Shen Siyu (born 25 November 2005) is a Chinese sprint canoeist.

== Career ==
In April 2026, she competed at the 2026 Asian Canoe Sprint Championships and won a gold medal in the K-4 500 metres, along with Yu Shimeng, Yin Mengdie and Wang Nan. In August 2026, she competed at the 2026 ICF Canoe Sprint World Championships and won a gold medal in the K-4 500 metres, with a time of 1:38.67. This marked the first time China won gold in the event at the ICF Canoe Sprint World Championships.
