= Canoeing at the 2026 Asian Games – Men's slalom K-1 =

Men's K-1 at the 2026 Asian Games
- Venue: Yahagigawa Canoe Slalom Course
- Date: 29–30 September 2026
- Competitors: 19 from 11 nations

Medalists
gold medal	Hu Zhaoshan	China
silver medal	Yuuki Tanaka	Japan
bronze medal	Alexandr Korobov	Kazakhstan

The men's slalom K-1 (kayak single) competition at the 2026 Asian Games was held from 29 to 30 September 2026 at the Yahagigawa Canoe Slalom Course in Toyota, Aichi Prefecture, Japan. Each NOC could enter two athletes but only one of them could advance to the final. Hu Zhaoshan won the gold medal, Yuuki Tanaka took silver and Alexandr Korobov the bronze.

== Schedule ==
All times are Japan Standard Time (UTC+09:00)

Date	Time	Event
Tuesday, 29 September 2026	10:30	Heats
Wednesday, 30 September 2026	10:30	Semifinal
Wednesday, 30 September 2026	13:30	Final

== Results ==
=== Heats ===
Rank	Athlete	Time	Pen.	Total
1	Kazuya Adachi (JPN)	91.18	4	95.18
2	Hu Zhaoshan (CHN)	93.32	4	97.32
3	Djanibek Temirgaliev (UZB)	97.33	0	97.33
4	Quan Xin (CHN)	94.18	4	98.18
5	Vladislav Ryabko (KAZ)	104.13	0	104.13
6	Liao Li-hong (TPE)	102.26	2	104.26
7	Piyanath Koetsuk (THA)	109.75	0	109.75
8	Hitesh Kewat (IND)	116.22	2	118.22
9	Janyawut Mangjit (THA)	121.78	4	125.78
10	Pradhyumna Singh Rathod (IND)	119.70	8	127.70
11	Yuuki Tanaka (JPN)	94.29	52	146.29
12	Alexandr Korobov (KAZ)	101.03	54	155.03
13	Baek Seo-jin (KOR)	122.92	58	180.92
14	Krisna Septiana (INA)	125.58	58	183.58
15	Bijaya Majhi (NEP)	146.06	56	202.06
16	Aashish Rana Magar (NEP)	155.86	56	211.86
17	Lee Kwon-hee (KOR)	156.65	212	368.65
18	Odjargal Batsukh (MGL)			DNF
—	Pavel Eygel (UZB)			DSQ

Progression system: 1 to 19 advanced to the semifinal, the rest were eliminated.

=== Semifinal ===
Rank	Athlete	Time	Pen.	Total
1	Yuuki Tanaka (JPN)	89.71	2	91.71
2	Hu Zhaoshan (CHN)	92.41	0	92.41
3	Kazuya Adachi (JPN)	94.08	0	94.08
4	Quan Xin (CHN)	92.83	4	96.83
5	Djanibek Temirgaliev (UZB)	99.62	4	103.62
6	Alexandr Korobov (KAZ)	100.87	4	104.87
7	Vladislav Ryabko (KAZ)	106.11	6	112.11
8	Liao Li-hong (TPE)	110.06	8	118.06
9	Piyanath Koetsuk (THA)	112.51	6	118.51
10	Janyawut Mangjit (THA)	116.57	2	118.57
11	Pradhyumna Singh Rathod (IND)	133.74	4	137.74
12	Baek Seo-jin (KOR)	125.30	14	139.30
13	Lee Kwon-hee (KOR)	159.60	8	167.60
14	Hitesh Kewat (IND)	124.89	60	184.89
15	Krisna Septiana (INA)	152.76	58	210.76
16	Bijaya Majhi (NEP)	159.73	116	275.73
17	Aashish Rana Magar (NEP)			DNF
—	Odjargal Batsukh (MGL)			DNS

Progression system: 1 to 11 advanced to the final (limited to one athlete per NOC), the rest were eliminated.

=== Final ===
Rank	Athlete	Time	Pen.	Total
1st place, gold medalist(s)	Hu Zhaoshan (CHN)	91.41	0	91.41
2nd place, silver medalist(s)	Yuuki Tanaka (JPN)	92.87	0	92.87
3rd place, bronze medalist(s)	Alexandr Korobov (KAZ)	94.48	0	94.48
4	Djanibek Temirgaliev (UZB)	100.54	2	102.54
5	Liao Li-hong (TPE)	103.86	4	107.86
6	Pradhyumna Singh Rathod (IND)	119.21	6	125.21
7	Baek Seo-jin (KOR)	132.39	4	136.39
8	Piyanath Koetsuk (THA)	112.27	52	164.27
9	Krisna Septiana (INA)	112.69	56	168.69
10	Bijaya Majhi (NEP)	147.14	164	311.14
