= Canoeing at the 2022 Asian Games – Men's K-2 500 metres =

Men's K-2 500 metres at the 2022 Asian Games
- Venue: Fuyang Water Sports Centre
- Date: 30 September – 2 October 2023
- Competitors: 26 from 13 nations

Medalists
gold medal	Bu Tingkai; Wang Congkang	China
silver medal	Cho Gwang-hee; Jang Sang-won	South Korea
bronze medal	Sepehr Saatchi; Peyman Ghavidel	Iran

The men's sprint K-2 (canoe double) 500 metres competition at the 2022 Asian Games was held on 30 September and 2 October 2023.

== Schedule ==
All times are China Standard Time (UTC+08:00)

Date	Time	Event
Saturday, 30 September 2023	10:30	Heats
Saturday, 30 September 2023	15:38	Semifinal
Monday, 2 October 2023	11:40	Final

== Results ==
=== Heats ===
- Qualification: 1–3 → Final (QF), Rest → Semifinal (QS)

==== Heat 1 ====
Rank	Team	Time	Notes
1	Iran (IRI); Sepehr Saatchi; Peyman Ghavidel	1:38.003	QF
2	Kazakhstan (KAZ); Andrey Yerguchyov; Igor Ryashentsev	1:38.338	QF
3	Kyrgyzstan (KGZ); Erlan Sultangaziev; Rysbek Tolomushev	1:40.353	QF
4	Singapore (SGP); Lucas Teo; Brandon Ooi	1:41.911	QS
5	Indonesia (INA); Irwan; Indra Hidayat	1:43.413	QS
6	Thailand (THA); Praison Buasamrong; Methasit Sitthipharat	1:44.380	QS
7	Macau (MAC); Choi Keng Wa; Bosco Lei Lagarica	2:06.717	QS

==== Heat 2 ====
Rank	Team	Time	Notes
1	China (CHN); Bu Tingkai; Wang Congkang	1:35.568	QF
2	South Korea (KOR); Cho Gwang-hee; Jang Sang-won	1:37.030	QF
3	Uzbekistan (UZB); Ozodjon Amriddinov; Denis Onufriev	1:38.285	QF
4	Iraq (IRQ); Ahmed Qays; Wael Khalid	1:41.464	QS
5	Hong Kong (HKG); So Pak Yin; Cheung Cheuk Ho	1:53.805	QS
6	Tajikistan (TJK); Abdusattor Gafurov; Tokhir Nurmukhammadi	1:55.239	QS

=== Semifinal ===
- Qualification: 1–3 → Final (QF)

Rank	Team	Time	Notes
1	Singapore (SGP); Lucas Teo; Brandon Ooi	1:41.350	QF
2	Thailand (THA); Praison Buasamrong; Methasit Sitthipharat	1:42.908	QF
3	Iraq (IRQ); Ahmed Qays; Wael Khalid	1:42.984	QF
4	Indonesia (INA); Irwan; Indra Hidayat	1:43.330	
5	Tajikistan (TJK); Abdusattor Gafurov; Tokhir Nurmukhammadi	1:53.648	
6	Hong Kong (HKG); So Pak Yin; Cheung Cheuk Ho	1:54.018	
7	Macau (MAC); Choi Keng Wa; Bosco Lei Lagarica	2:03.113	

=== Final ===
Rank	Team	Time
1st place, gold medalist(s)	China (CHN); Bu Tingkai; Wang Congkang	1:36.658
2nd place, silver medalist(s)	South Korea (KOR); Cho Gwang-hee; Jang Sang-won	1:37.690
3rd place, bronze medalist(s)	Iran (IRI); Sepehr Saatchi; Peyman Ghavidel	1:39.291
4	Kazakhstan (KAZ); Andrey Yerguchyov; Igor Ryashentsev	1:39.877
5	Thailand (THA); Praison Buasamrong; Methasit Sitthipharat	1:43.114
6	Singapore (SGP); Lucas Teo; Brandon Ooi	1:43.141
7	Uzbekistan (UZB); Ozodjon Amriddinov; Denis Onufriev	1:43.188
8	Kyrgyzstan (KGZ); Erlan Sultangaziev; Rysbek Tolomushev	1:45.481
9	Iraq (IRQ); Ahmed Qays; Wael Khalid	1:45.785
