= Wang Congkang =

Chinese canoeist (born 1996)

Personal information
- Nationality: Chinese
- Born: 31 October 1996 (age 29)

Sport
- Sport: Canoe sprint
Medal record
Men's canoe sprint
Representing China
Asian Games
Gold medal – first place	2022 Hangzhou	K-2 500 m
Gold medal – first place	2022 Hangzhou	K-4 500 m
Asian Championships
Silver medal – second place	2017 Shanghai	K-4 1000 m
Bronze medal – third place	2017 Shanghai	K-2 1000 m
Bronze medal – third place	2025 Nanchang	K-2 500 m

Wang Congkang (born 31 October 1996) is a Chinese canoeist. He competed in the men's K-2 1000 m event at the 2020 Summer Olympics.

== Early life ==
From an early age Congkang showed talent in his Judo training developing his technique, later scout coach Chen Chunseng would notice said skill and recommend him kayak lessons, as of then he discovered his physique potential and Canoe.
