= Huang Jieyi =

Chinese canoeist

Personal information
- Born: 16 January 1993 (age 33)

Sport
- Sport: Canoe sprint
Medal record
Women's canoe sprint
Representing China
Youth Olympics
Silver medal – second place	2010 Singapore	K1 sprint
Asian Games
Gold medal – first place	2014 Incheon	K-4 500 m
Gold medal – first place	2018 Jakarta	K-4 500 m
Asian Championships
Gold medal – first place	2015 Palembang	K-4 500 m
Silver medal – second place	2015 Palembang	K-2 200 m
Silver medal – second place	2025 Nanchang	K-2 500 m
Silver medal – second place	2025 Nanchang	K-4 500 m

Huang Jieyi (born 16 January 1993) is a Chinese canoeist. She competed in the women's K-1 200 metres event at the 2020 Summer Olympics.
