= Li Dongyin =

Chinese canoeist (born 1995)

Personal information
- Born: 6 July 1995 (age 31)

Sport
- Country: China
- Sport: Canoe sprint
Medal record
Women's canoe sprint
Representing China
World Championships
Silver medal – second place	2025 Milan	K-4 500 m
Asian Games
Gold medal – first place	2022 Hangzhou	K-1 500 m
Gold medal – first place	2022 Hangzhou	K-4 500 m
Asian Championships
Gold medal – first place	2017 Shanghai	K-4 200 m
Gold medal – first place	2017 Shanghai	K-4 500 m

Li Dongyin (born 6 July 1995) is a Chinese canoeist. She competed in the women's K-2 500 metres and the K-4 500 metres events at the 2020 Summer Olympics.
