= Canoeing at the 2022 Asian Games – Men's K-4 500 metres =

Men's K-4 500 metres at the 2022 Asian Games
- Venue: Fuyang Water Sports Centre
- Date: 1–3 October 2023
- Competitors: 44 from 11 nations

Medalists
gold medal	China; Bu Tingkai, Wang Congkang, Zhang Dong, Dong Yi
silver medal	South Korea; Cho Gwang-hee, Jo Hyun-hee, Jang Sang-won, Jeong Ju-hwan
bronze medal	Japan; Keiji Mizumoto, Akihiro Inoue, Taishi Tanada, Seiji Komatsu

The men's sprint K-4 (kayak four) 500 metres competition at the 2022 Asian Games was held on 1 and 3 October 2023.

== Schedule ==
All times are China Standard Time (UTC+08:00)

Date	Time	Event
Sunday, 1 October 2023	10:02	Heats
Sunday, 1 October 2023	15:16	Semifinal
Tuesday, 3 October 2023	11:05	Final

== Results ==
=== Heats ===
- Qualification: 1–3 → Final (QF), Rest → Semifinal (QS)

==== Heat 1 ====
Rank	Team	Time	Notes
1	South Korea (KOR); Cho Gwang-hee; Jo Hyun-hee; Jang Sang-won; Jeong Ju-hwan	1:26.013	QF
2	Iran (IRI); Pouria Sharifi; Sepehr Saatchi; Ali Aghamirzaei; Peyman Ghavidel	1:26.220	QF
3	Uzbekistan (UZB); Samandar Khaydarov; Vilyam Ibragimov; Denis Onufriev; Ozodjon Amriddinov	1:27.009	QF
4	Kyrgyzstan (KGZ); Rodion Tuigunov; Erlan Sultangaziev; Rysbek Tolomushev; Vladislav Prokopov	1:37.355	QS
5	Hong Kong (HKG); Kwok Ka Wai; Mok Yuen Fung; Chang Long Yin; Tsoi Yik San	1:38.100	QS
6	Tajikistan (TJK); Abdusattor Gafurov; Manuchekhr Bayozov; Tokhir Nurmukhammadi; Zohirjon Nabiev	1:44.761	QS

==== Heat 2 ====
Rank	Team	Time	Notes
1	China (CHN); Bu Tingkai; Wang Congkang; Zhang Dong; Dong Yi	1:25.440	QF
2	Japan (JPN); Keiji Mizumoto; Akihiro Inoue; Taishi Tanada; Seiji Komatsu	1:26.563	QF
3	Kazakhstan (KAZ); Bekarys Ramatulla; Andrey Yerguchyov; Sergii Tokarnytskyi; Igor Ryashentsev	1:28.922	QF
4	Singapore (SGP); Daniel Koh; Kendrick Ang; Sean Teo; Jovi Jayden Kalaichelvan	1:33.929	QS
5	Thailand (THA); Natthaphat Chaijantuek; Narongsak Phonkham; Aditep Srichart; Aphisit Thamom	1:40.223	QS

=== Semifinal ===
- Qualification: 1–3 → Final (QF)

Rank	Team	Time	Notes
1	Kyrgyzstan (KGZ); Rodion Tuigunov; Erlan Sultangaziev; Rysbek Tolomushev; Vladislav Prokopov	1:32.935	QF
2	Singapore (SGP); Daniel Koh; Kendrick Ang; Sean Teo; Jovi Jayden Kalaichelvan	1:33.824	QF
3	Thailand (THA); Natthaphat Chaijantuek; Narongsak Phonkham; Aditep Srichart; Aphisit Thamom	1:37.205	QF
4	Hong Kong (HKG); Kwok Ka Wai; Mok Yuen Fung; Chang Long Yin; Tsoi Yik San	1:37.696	
5	Tajikistan (TJK); Abdusattor Gafurov; Manuchekhr Bayozov; Tokhir Nurmukhammadi; Zohirjon Nabiev	1:42.664	

=== Final ===
Rank	Team	Time
1st place, gold medalist(s)	China (CHN); Bu Tingkai; Wang Congkang; Zhang Dong; Dong Yi	1:23.859
2nd place, silver medalist(s)	South Korea (KOR); Cho Gwang-hee; Jo Hyun-hee; Jang Sang-won; Jeong Ju-hwan	1:25.006
3rd place, bronze medalist(s)	Japan (JPN); Keiji Mizumoto; Akihiro Inoue; Taishi Tanada; Seiji Komatsu	1:25.751
4	Iran (IRI); Pouria Sharifi; Sepehr Saatchi; Ali Aghamirzaei; Peyman Ghavidel	1:26.480
5	Uzbekistan (UZB); Samandar Khaydarov; Vilyam Ibragimov; Denis Onufriev; Ozodjon Amriddinov	1:26.939
6	Kazakhstan (KAZ); Bekarys Ramatulla; Andrey Yerguchyov; Sergii Tokarnytskyi; Igor Ryashentsev	1:28.400
7	Kyrgyzstan (KGZ); Rodion Tuigunov; Erlan Sultangaziev; Rysbek Tolomushev; Vladislav Prokopov	1:31.874
8	Singapore (SGP); Daniel Koh; Kendrick Ang; Sean Teo; Jovi Jayden Kalaichelvan	1:32.575
9	Thailand (THA); Natthaphat Chaijantuek; Narongsak Phonkham; Aditep Srichart; Aphisit Thamom	1:36.447
