= Zhang Dong =

Chinese canoeist (born 1996)

Personal information
- Nationality: Chinese
- Born: 18 November 1996 (age 29)

Sport
- Sport: Canoe sprint
Medal record
Men's canoe sprint
Representing China
Asian Games
Gold medal – first place	2018 Jakarta-Palembang	K-2 1000 m
Gold medal – first place	2022 Hangzhou	K-1 1000 m
Gold medal – first place	2022 Hangzhou	K-4 500 m
Asian Championships
Gold medal – first place	2025 Nanchang	K-1 500 m
Gold medal – first place	2025 Nanchang	K-1 1000 m
Gold medal – first place	2025 Nanchang	K-4 500 m
Silver medal – second place	2017 Shanghai	K-1 1000 m
Silver medal – second place	2017 Shanghai	K-4 1000 m
Bronze medal – third place	2017 Shanghai	K-2 1000 m

Zhang Dong (born 18 November 1996) is a Chinese canoeist. He competed in the men's K-1 1000 metres event at the 2020 Summer Olympics.
