= Lena Röhlings =

German canoeist (born 2002)

Personal information
- Born: 2 September 2002 (age 23) Potsdam, Germany

Sport
- Country: Germany
- Sport: Sprint kayak
- Event(s): K-2 500 m, K-4 500 m
Medal record
Women's canoe sprint
Representing Germany
World Championships
Gold medal – first place	2023 Duisburg	K-2 Mix 500 m
European Games
Silver medal – second place	2023 Kraków-Małopolska	K-4 500 m
Bronze medal – third place	2023 Kraków-Małopolska	K-2 Mix 200 m

Lena Röhlings (born 2 September 2002) is a German canoeist. She represented Germany at the 2024 Summer Olympics.

== Career ==
Röhlings competed at the 2023 ICF Canoe Sprint World Championships in the mixed K-2 500 metres event and won a gold medal, with Jacob Schopf. She also competed in the K-4 500 metres event and finished in eighth place with a time of 1:33.433. As a result, they qualified for the 2024 Summer Olympics.
