= 2026 ICF Canoe Sprint World Championships – Women's K-4 500 metres =

Women's K-4 500 metres at the 2026 ICF Canoe Sprint World Championships
- Venue: Lake Malta
- Location: Poznań, Poland
- Dates: 26-28 August
- Competitors: 92 from 23 nations
- Teams: 23
- Winning time: 1:38.67

Medalists
gold medal	Shimeng Yu; Mengdie Yin; Nan Wang; Siyu Shen	China
silver medal	Sara Ouzande; Lucia Val; Daniela Garcia Heredia; Barbara Pardo	Spain
bronze medal	Paulina Paszek; Finja Hermanussen; Pauline Jagsch; Nele Reinwardt	Germany

The women's K-4 500 metres competition at the 2026 ICF Canoe Sprint World Championships in Poznań took place at Lake Malta.

== Schedule ==
The schedule is as follows:

Date	Time	Round
Wdnesday 26 August 2026	9:55	Heats
Thursday 27 August 2026	14:36	Semifinals
Friday 28 August 2026	14:34	Final B
Friday 28 August 2026	15:04	Final A

== Record ==
The best performance previously in this discipline was:

Women's K-4 500 metres
World Best	1:28.21	Hungary; SZABO, KOZAK, KARASZ, VAD	Moscow (Russia)

=== Heats ===
Three heats were held. The results of the heats were as follows :

Qualification rule : First in each heat direct to A final; next six in each heat qualify for semi-finals; remainder are eliminated.

Heat 1

9:55

Rank	Lane	Nation	Athletes	Time	Gap	Notes
1	5	Germany	Paulina Paszek; Finja Hermanussen; Pauline Jagsch; Nele Reinwardt	1:38.14		FA
2	6	Poland	Sandra Ostrowska; Dominika Putto; Julia Olszewska; Katarzyna Kosciolek	1:38.75	0.61	SF
3	3	Norway	Maria Virik; Anna Margrete Sletsjoee; Vilma Fjeldheim; Kristine Strand Amundsen	1:39.77	1.63	SF
4	4	Denmark	Sara Corfixsen Milthers; Frederikke Hauge Moercke; Katrine Hladka Jensen; Bolette Nyvang Iversen	1:40.44	2.3	SF
5	1	Italy	Sara Daldoss; Anastasia Insabella; Meshua Marigo; Sara Vesentini	1:40.67	2.53	SF
6	2	Ukraine	Mariya Povkh; Varvara Semykina; Ivanna Dyachenko; Hanna Pavlova	1:41.59	3.45	SF
7	7	Argentina	Brenda Rojas; Maria Magdalena Garro; Paulina Amneris Barreiro Hus; Lucia Dalto Aziz	1:41.83	3.69	SF
8	8	Kazakhstan	Olga Shmelyova; Tatyana Tokarnitskaya; Stella Sukhanova; Evelina Kostenko	1:42.94	4.8	SF

Heat 2

10:01

Rank	Lane	Nation	Athletes	Time	Gap	Notes
1	5	China	Shimeng Yu; Mengdie Yin; Nan Wang; Siyu Shen	1:38.68		FA
2	2	Neutral Athletes B	Alina Svita; Uladzislava Skryhanava; Ina Sauchuk; Nadzeya Kushner	1:39.64	0.96	SF
3	7	Hungary	Reka Kisko; Angelina Judit Szegedi; Dorina Decsi; Anna Meszaros	1:41.71	3.03	SF
4	3	Sweden	Moa Wikberg; Julia Lagerstam; Melina Andersson; Ella Richter	1:41.71	3.03	SF
5	4	Australia	Kailey Harlen; Natalia Drobot; Claudia Bailey; Alyssa Bailey	1:41.73	3.05	SF
6	6	Slovakia	Reka Bugar; Sofia Bergendi; Hana Gavorova; Bianka Sidova	1:42.12	3.44	SF
7	8	New Zealand	Olivia Brett; Jacqueline Kennedy; Greer Morley; Lucy Matehaere	1:42.80	4.12	SF
8	1	Portugal	Francisca Lopes; Clara Duarte; Ana Rodrigues; Maria Rego Gomes	1:45.89	7.21	

Heat 3

10:06

Rank	Lane	Nation	Athletes	Time	Gap	Notes
1	5	Spain	Sara Ouzande; Lucia Val; Daniela Garcia Heredia; Barbara Pardo	1:39.33		FA
2	4	Great Britain	Emily Lewis; Zoe Clark; Deborah Kerr; Kristina Armstrong	1:40.48	1.15	SF
3	3	Mexico	Karina Alanis Morales; Ana Ximena Hernandez; Beatriz Briones Fragoza; Maricela Montemayor Rodriguez	1:40.94	1.61	SF
4	6	France	Salya Lefoulon; Manon Hostens; Vanina Paoletti; Pauline Freslon	1:41.83	2.5	SF
5	8	Uzbekistan	Milana Dushev-Janic; Ekaterina Shubina; Arina Tanatmisheva; Shakhrizoda Mavlonova	1:42.73	3.4	SF
6	2	Czech Republic	Anezka Paloudova; Zuzana Hanusova; Stepanka Sobiskova; Eliska Betlachova	1:43.06	3.73	SF
7	7	Canada	Callie Loch; Michelle Russell; Riley Melanson; Toshka Besharah	1:43.87	4.54	SF

=== Semi finals ===
Two semifinals were held, the results are as follows:

Qualification rule : First three in each heat to A final: Next four in each heat to B final.

Semifinal 1

14:36

Rank	Lane	Nation	Athletes	Time	Gap	Notes
1	2	Australia	Kailey Harlen; Natalia Drobot; Claudia Bailey; Alyssa Bailey	1:43.58		FA
2	5	Poland	Sandra Ostrowska; Dominika Putto; Julia Olszewska; Katarzyna Kosciolek	1:43.82	0.24	FA
3	7	Denmark	Sara Corfixsen Milthers; Frederikke Hauge Moercke; Katrine Hladka Jensen; Bolette Nyvang Iversen	1:44.05	0.47	FA
4	4	Hungary	Reka Kisko; Angelina Judit Szegedi; Dorina Decsi; Anna Meszaros	1:44.36	0.78	FB
5	3	France	Salya Lefoulon; Manon Hostens; Vanina Paoletti; Pauline Freslon	1:45.17	1.59	FB
6	6	Mexico	Karina Alanis Morales; Ana Ximena Hernandez; Beatriz Briones Fragoza; Maricela Montemayor Rodriguez	1:45.30	1.72	FB
7	8	Czech Republic	Anezka Paloudova; Zuzana Hanusova; Stepanka Sobiskova; Eliska Betlachova	1:45.74	2.16	FB
8	9	New Zealand	Olivia Brett; Jacqueline Kennedy; Greer Morley; Lucy Matehaere	1:46.09	2.51	qBT
9	1	Ukraine	Mariya Povkh; Varvara Semykina; Ivanna Dyachenko; Hanna Pavlova	1:49.03	5.45	

Semifinal 2

14:42

Rank	Lane	Nation	Athletes	Time	Gap	Notes
1	5	Neutral Athletes B	Alina Svita; Uladzislava Skryhanava; Ina Sauchuk; Nadzeya Kushner	1:42.95		FA
2	8	Slovakia	Reka Bugar; Sofia Bergendi; Hana Gavorova; Bianka Sidova	1:43.69	0.74	FA
3	3	Sweden	Moa Wikberg; Julia Lagerstam; Melina Andersson; Ella Richter	1:44.55	1.6	FA
4	6	Norway	Maria Virik; Anna Margrete Sletsjoee; Vilma Fjeldheim; Kristine Strand Amundsen	1:44.56	1.61	FB
5	4	Great Britain	Emily Lewis; Zoe Clark; Deborah Kerr; Kristina Armstrong	1:44.86	1.91	FB
6	7	Italy	Sara Daldoss; Anastasia Insabella; Meshua Marigo; Sara Vesentini	1:46.14	3.19	FB
7	2	Uzbekistan	Milana Dushev-Janic; Ekaterina Shubina; Arina Tanatmisheva; Shakhrizoda Mavlonova	1:47.45	4.5	FB
8	1	Argentina	Brenda Rojas; Maria Magdalena Garro; Paulina Amneris Barreiro Hus; Lucia Dalto Aziz	1:48.03	5.08	FB
9	9	Canada	Callie Loch; Michelle Russell; Riley Melanson; Toshka Besharah	1:48.42	5.47	

=== Finals ===
The results of the finals were as follows:

B final

14:34

Rank	Lane	Nation	Athletes	Time	Gap
1	7	Mexico	Karina Alanis Morales; Ana Ximena Hernandez; Beatriz Briones Fragoza; Maricela Montemayor Rodriguez	1:41.27	-
2	5	Hungary	Reka Kisko; Angelina Judit Szegedi; Dorina Decsi; Anna Meszaros	1:41.68	+0.41
3	6	Great Britain	Emily Lewis; Zoe Clark; Deborah Kerr; Kristina Armstrong	1:42.20	+0.93
4	9	New Zealand	Olivia Brett; Jacqueline Kennedy; Greer Morley; Lucy Matehaere	1:42.44	+1.17
5	3	France	Salya Lefoulon; Manon Hostens; Vanina Paoletti; Pauline Freslon	1:42.53	+1.26
6	4	Norway	Maria Virik; Anna Margrete Sletsjoee; Vilma Fjeldheim; Kristine Strand Amundsen	1:43.35	+2.08
7	2	Italy	Sara Daldoss; Anastasia Insabella; Meshua Marigo; Sara Vesentini	1:43.56	+2.29
8	8	Uzbekistan	Milana Dushev-Janic; Ekaterina Shubina; Arina Tanatmisheva; Shakhrizoda Mavlonova	1:43.88	+2.61
9	1	Czech Republic	Anezka Paloudova; Zuzana Hanusova; Stepanka Sobiskova; Eliska Betlachova	1:44.64	+3.37

A final

15:04

Rank	Lane	Nation	Athletes	Time	Gap
1st place, gold medalist(s)	4	China	Shimeng Yu; Mengdie Yin; Nan Wang; Siyu Shen	1:38.67	-
2nd place, silver medalist(s)	6	Spain	Sara Ouzande; Lucia Val; Daniela Garcia Heredia; Barbara Pardo	1:39.91	+1.238
3rd place, bronze medalist(s)	5	Germany	Paulina Paszek; Finja Hermanussen; Pauline Jagsch; Nele Reinwardt	1:39.93	+1.258
4=	2	Slovakia	Reka Bugar; Sofia Bergendi; Hana Gavorova; Bianka Sidova	1:40.94	+2.261
4=	8	Poland	Sandra Ostrowska; Dominika Putto; Julia Olszewska; Katarzyna Kosciolek	1:40.94	+2.261
6	9	Sweden	Moa Wikberg; Julia Lagerstam; Melina Andersson; Ella Richter	1:40.97	+2.296
7	7	Neutral Athletes B	Alina Svita; Uladzislava Skryhanava; Ina Sauchuk; Nadzeya Kushner	1:40.99	+2.319
8	3	Australia	Kailey Harlen; Natalia Drobot; Claudia Bailey; Alyssa Bailey	1:41.45	+2.774
9	1	Denmark	Sara Corfixsen Milthers; Frederikke Hauge Moercke; Katrine Hladka Jensen; Bolette Nyvang Iversen	1:42.15	+3.474
