= Bu Tingkai =

Chinese canoeist (born 1995)

Personal information
- Nationality: Chinese
- Born: 19 December 1995 (age 30)

Sport
- Sport: Canoe sprint
Medal record
Men's canoe sprint
Representing China
Asian Championships
Gold medal – first place	2025 Nanchang	K-4 500 m
Asian Games
Gold medal – first place	2018 Jakarta-Palembang	K-2 1000 m
Gold medal – first place	2022 Hangzhou	K-2 500 m
Gold medal – first place	2022 Hangzhou	K-4 500 m

Bu Tingkai (born 19 December 1995) is a Chinese canoeist. He competed in the men's K-2 1000 metres event at the 2020 Summer Olympics.
