= Canoeing at the 2018 Asian Games – Women's K-4 500 metres =

Women's K-4 500 metres at the 2018 Asian Games
- Venue: Jakabaring Lake
- Date: 1 September 2018
- Competitors: 36 from 9 nations

Medalists
| gold medal | China; Ma Qing, Zhou Yu, Yang Jiali, Huang Jieyi |
| silver medal | Kazakhstan; Inna Klinova, Irina Podoinikova, Zoya Ananchenko, Viktoriya Kopyova |
| bronze medal | Uzbekistan; Natalya Kazantseva, Yuliya Borzova, Ekaterina Shubina, Kseniya Kochneva |

The women's sprint K-4 (kayak four) 500 metres competition at the 2018 Asian Games was held on 1 September 2018.

== Schedule ==
All times are Western Indonesia Time (UTC+07:00)

| Date | Time | Event |
|---|---|---|
| Saturday, 1 September 2018 | 11:30 | Final |

== Results ==
| Rank | Team | Time |
|---|---|---|
| 1st place, gold medalist(s) | China (CHN); Ma Qing; Zhou Yu; Yang Jiali; Huang Jieyi | 1:33.896 |
| 2nd place, silver medalist(s) | Kazakhstan (KAZ); Inna Klinova; Irina Podoinikova; Zoya Ananchenko; Viktoriya Kopyova | 1:35.452 |
| 3rd place, bronze medalist(s) | Uzbekistan (UZB); Natalya Kazantseva; Yuliya Borzova; Ekaterina Shubina; Kseniya Kochneva | 1:38.040 |
| 4 | South Korea (KOR); Choi Min-ji; Lee Sun-ja; Kim Guk-joo; Lee Ha-lin | 1:39.092 |
| 5 | Singapore (SGP); Soh Sze Ying; Geraldine Lee; Sarah Chen; Stephenie Chen | 1:40.819 |
| 6 | Chinese Taipei (TPE); Liu Hui-chi; Chen Hsin-shuang; Yan Siou-hua; Chou Ju-chuan | 1:41.279 |
| 7 | Indonesia (INA); Ririn Puji Astuti; Stevani Maysche Ibo; Masripah; Emiliana Deau | 1:41.885 |
| 8 | Thailand (THA); Jitsupa Prakobtam; Jirawan Phaophandee; Kantida Nurun; Porncharus Yamprasert | 1:51.722 |
| 9 | India (IND); Ragina Kiro; Sandhya Kispotta; L. Meena Devi; Soniya Devi Phairembam | 1:51.729 |
