= 2023 ICF Canoe Sprint World Championships – Mixed K-2 500 metres =

Mixed K-2 500 metres at the 2023 ICF Canoe Sprint World Championships
- Venue: Sportpark Duisburg
- Location: Duisburg, Germany
- Dates: 24–27 August
- Competitors: 38 from 19 nations
- Winning time: 1:33.033

Medalists
gold medal	Lena Röhlings; Jacob Schopf	Germany
silver medal	Alyssa Bull; Jackson Collins	Australia
bronze medal	Bárbara Pardo; Íñigo Peña	Spain

The mixed K-2 500 metres competition at the 2023 ICF Canoe Sprint World Championships in Duisburg took place in Sportpark Duisburg.

== Schedule ==
The schedule is as follows:

Date	Time	Round
Thursday 24 August 2023	12:32	Heats
Saturday 26 August 2023	17:06	Semifinals
Saturday 27 August 2023	12:45	Final B
Saturday 27 August 2023	12:38	Final A

== Results ==
=== Heats ===
The fastest boat in each heat advanced directly to the final. The next six fastest boats in each heat advanced to the semifinal.

==== Heat 1 ====
Rank	Canoeist	Country	Time	Notes
1	Lena Röhlings; Jacob Schopf	Germany	1:33.502	QA
2	Bárbara Pardo; Íñigo Peña	Spain	1:35.339	QS
3	Julia Lagerstam; Theodor Orban	Sweden	1:36.573	QS
4	Tatyana Tokarnitskaya; Bekarys Ramatulla	Kazakhstan	1:38.657	QS
5	Vemund Jensen; Elise Erland	Norway	1:46.010	QS
6	Chung Hoi Tik; Cheung Cheuk Ho	Hong Kong	1:58.258	QS
7	Parvathy Geetha; Yogendra Kumar Tembhre	India	2:32.515	QS

==== Heat 2 ====
Rank	Canoeist	Country	Time	Notes
1	Anna Lucz; Márk Opavszky	Hungary	1:35.494	QA
2	Wang Chi; Jiang Han	China	1:38.555	QS
3	Yusuke Miyata; Yuriko Yamashita	Japan	1:38.945	QS
4	Vasyl Smilka; Snizhana Stalinova	Ukraine	1:40.908	QS
5	Zoe Clark; Philip Miles	Great Britain	1:41.509	QS
6	Samaa Ahmed; Ahmed Mohamed	Egypt	1:52.336	QS

==== Heat 3 ====
Rank	Canoeist	Country	Time	Notes
1	Alyssa Bull; Jackson Collins	Australia	1:34.480	QA
2	Sara del Gratta; Tommaso Freschi	Italy	1:34.634	QS
3	Mia Medved; Rok Šmit	Slovenia	1:36.826	QS
4	Nathan Humberston; Emma McDonald	United States	1:44.033	QS
5	Mónica Hincapié; Juan Arbeláez	Colombia	1:48.075	QS
	Aya Ferfad; Ayoub Haidra	Algeria	DSQ	

=== Semifinal ===
The fastest three boats in each semi advanced to the A final. The next four fastest boats in each semi and best 8th advanced to the final B.

==== Semifinal 1 ====
Rank	Canoeist	Country	Time	Notes
1	Bárbara Pardo; Íñigo Peña	Spain	1:35.781	QA
2	Mia Medved; Rok Šmit	Slovenia	1:36.584	QA
3	Zoe Clark; Philip Miles	Great Britain	1:38.835	QA
4	Tatyana Tokarnitskaya; Bekarys Ramatulla	Kazakhstan	1:38.846	QB
5	Yusuke Miyata; Yuriko Yamashita	Japan	1:39.058	QB
6	Nathan Humberston; Emma McDonald	United States	1:41.777	QB
7	Chung Hoi Tik; Cheung Cheuk Ho	Hong Kong	1:55.090	QB

==== Semifinal 2 ====
Rank	Canoeist	Country	Time	Notes
1	Sara del Gratta; Tommaso Freschi	Italy	1:36.309	QA
2	Wang Chi; Jiang Han	China	1:37.188	QA
3	Julia Lagerstam; Theodor Orban	Sweden	1:37.778	QA
4	Vasyl Smilka; Snizhana Stalinova	Ukraine	1:38.103	QB
5	Vemund Jensen; Elise Erland	Norway	1:38.798	QB
6	Mónica Hincapié; Juan Arbeláez	Colombia	1:46.862	QB
7	Samaa Ahmed; Ahmed Mohamed	Egypt	1:53.311	QB
8	Parvathy Geetha; Yogendra Kumar Tembhre	India	2:40.578	qB

=== Final B ===
Competitors in this final raced for positions 10 to 18.

Rank	Canoeist	Country	Time
1	Vasyl Smilka; Snizhana Stalinova	Ukraine	1:37.393
2	Vemund Jensen; Elise Erland	Norway	1:38.250
3	Yusuke Miyata; Yuriko Yamashita	Japan	1:38.502
4	Tatyana Tokarnitskaya; Bekarys Ramatulla	Kazakhstan	1:39.117
5	Nathan Humberston; Emma McDonald	United States	1:42.722
6	Mónica Hincapié; Juan Arbeláez	Colombia	1:45.786
7	Samaa Ahmed; Ahmed Mohamed	Egypt	1:51.471
8	Chung Hoi Tik; Cheung Cheuk Ho	Hong Kong	1:55.287
9	Parvathy Geetha; Yogendra Kumar Tembhre	India	2:33.616

=== Final A ===
Competitors raced for positions 1 to 9, with medals going to the top three.

Rank	Canoeist	Country	Time
1st place, gold medalist(s)	Lena Röhlings; Jacob Schopf	Germany	1:33.033
2nd place, silver medalist(s)	Alyssa Bull; Jackson Collins	Australia	1:33.179
3rd place, bronze medalist(s)	Bárbara Pardo; Íñigo Peña	Spain	1:33.912
4	Mia Medved; Rok Šmit	Slovenia	1:35.051
5	Sara del Gratta; Tommaso Freschi	Italy	1:35.279
6	Anna Lucz; Márk Opavszky	Hungary	1:35.328
7	Julia Lagerstam; Theodor Orban	Sweden	1:36.894
8	Wang Chi; Jiang Han	China	1:37.796
9	Zoe Clark; Philip Miles	Great Britain	1:39.509
