= Canoeing at the 2022 Asian Games – Women's K-1 500 metres =

Women's K-1 500 metres at the 2022 Asian Games
- Venue: Fuyang Water Sports Centre
- Date: 1–3 October 2023
- Competitors: 11 from 11 nations

Medalists
gold medal	Li Dongyin	China
silver medal	Stephenie Chen	Singapore
bronze medal	Hedieh Kazemi	Iran

The women's sprint K-1 (kayak single) 500 metres competition at the 2022 Asian Games was held on 1 and 3 October 2023.

== Schedule ==
All times are China Standard Time (UTC+08:00)

Date	Time	Event
Sunday, 1 October 2023	09:50	Heats
Sunday, 1 October 2023	15:10	Semifinal
Tuesday, 3 October 2023	10:15	Final

== Results ==
=== Heats ===
- Qualification: 1–3 → Final (QF), Rest → Semifinal (QS)

==== Heat 1 ====
Rank	Athlete	Time	Notes
1	Li Dongyin (CHN)	2:06.325	QF
2	Stephenie Chen (SGP)	2:07.090	QF
3	Hedieh Kazemi (IRI)	2:09.054	QF
4	Madinakhon Ashrafkhonova (UZB)	2:15.225	QS
5	Ngô Phương Thảo (VIE)	2:25.717	QS
6	Sam Cheng (MAC)	2:46.843	QS

==== Heat 2 ====
Rank	Athlete	Time	Notes
1	Hideka Tatara (JPN)	2:06.635	QF
2	Anastassiya Berezovskaya (KAZ)	2:06.783	QF
3	Jo Shin-young (KOR)	2:10.209	QF
4	Soniya Devi Phairembam (IND)	2:17.351	QS
5	Khanyakron Suphawatthanakon (THA)	2:18.192	QS

=== Semifinal ===
- Qualification: 1–3 → Final (QF)

Rank	Athlete	Time	Notes
1	Madinakhon Ashrafkhonova (UZB)	2:11.352	QF
2	Soniya Devi Phairembam (IND)	2:16.435	QF
3	Khanyakron Suphawatthanakon (THA)	2:18.260	QF
4	Ngô Phương Thảo (VIE)	2:18.977	
5	Sam Cheng (MAC)	2:39.421	

=== Final ===
Rank	Athlete	Time
1st place, gold medalist(s)	Li Dongyin (CHN)	1:58.931
2nd place, silver medalist(s)	Stephenie Chen (SGP)	2:00.074
3rd place, bronze medalist(s)	Hedieh Kazemi (IRI)	2:00.635
4	Hideka Tatara (JPN)	2:04.798
5	Jo Shin-young (KOR)	2:05.359
6	Anastassiya Berezovskaya (KAZ)	2:05.968
7	Madinakhon Ashrafkhonova (UZB)	2:07.104
8	Soniya Devi Phairembam (IND)	2:14.555
9	Khanyakron Suphawatthanakon (THA)	2:15.328
