= Pallavi Jagtap =

Indian canoeist

Pallavi Jagtap (born 2008) is an Indian canoeist from Madhya Pradesh. She represented India in the women's Canoe slalom singles at the 2026 Asian Games in Japan. She entered the semifinals along with teammate Rina Sen.

Jagtap is from Madhya Pradesh and learnt her basics at the Madhya Pradesh State Water Sports Academy.

== Career ==
Jagtap entered the semifinals of the 2026 Asian Games. In the women's canoe single heats, she finished seventh with a time of 224.20 seconds. In June 2026, she won a gold medal in the women's slalom C-1 at the National Canoe Slalom Championships 2026 in Sahastradhara Ghat, Bothu, Maheshwar, Khargone district, Madhya Pradesh.

In March 2025, she won a silver medal in the U18 women's C1 at the 2025 Asian Canoe Slalom Junior and U23 Championships in Rayong, Thialand. She also won another silver medal partnering Bharti Kewat in the women's K-1 Junior team event besides a bronze with Shikha Chouhan in the C-1 Under 23 Women's team event.

In August 2025, she was part of the Indian team that won a silver medal in the women's canoe slalom team event at the Asian Canoe Slalom Championship held recently in Guizhou, China.
