= Canoeing at the 2022 Asian Games – Women's K-2 500 metres =

Women's K-2 500 metres at the 2022 Asian Games
- Venue: Fuyang Water Sports Centre
- Date: 30 September – 2 October 2023
- Competitors: 20 from 10 nations

Medalists
gold medal	Yin Mengdie; Wang Nan	China
silver medal	Olga Shmelyova; Irina Podoinikova	Kazakhstan
bronze medal	Ekaterina Shubina; Arina Tanatmisheva	Uzbekistan

The women's sprint K-2 (kayak double) 500 metres competition at the 2022 Asian Games was held on 30 September and 2 October 2023.

== Schedule ==
All times are China Standard Time (UTC+08:00)

Date	Time	Event
Saturday, 30 September 2023	10:10	Heats
Saturday, 30 September 2023	15:30	Semifinal
Monday, 2 October 2023	10:55	Final

== Results ==
=== Heats ===
- Qualification: 1–3 → Final (QF), Rest → Semifinal (QS)

==== Heat 1 ====
Rank	Team	Time	Notes
1	Kazakhstan (KAZ); Olga Shmelyova; Irina Podoinikova	1:49.240	QF
2	Singapore (SGP); Stephenie Chen; Soh Sze Ying	1:53.491	QF
3	Iran (IRI); Hedieh Kazemi; Elnaz Shafieian	1:56.379	QF
4	Thailand (THA); Pornnapphan Phuangmaiming; Panwad Thongnim	1:58.913	QS
5	Vietnam (VIE); Đỗ Thị Thanh Thảo; Hoàng Thị Hường	1:59.100	QS

==== Heat 2 ====
Rank	Team	Time	Notes
1	China (CHN); Yin Mengdie; Wang Nan	1:49.388	QF
2	Uzbekistan (UZB); Ekaterina Shubina; Arina Tanatmisheva	1:50.536	QF
3	South Korea (KOR); Choi Ran; Lee Ha-lin	1:55.803	QF
4	India (IND); Binita Chanu Oinam; Parvathy Geetha	2:06.956	QS
5	Macau (MAC); Sam Cheng; Wong Cheok Io	2:26.392	QS

=== Semifinal ===
- Qualification: 1–3 → Final (QF)

Rank	Team	Time	Notes
1	Vietnam (VIE); Đỗ Thị Thanh Thảo; Hoàng Thị Hường	2:01.710	QF
2	India (IND); Binita Chanu Oinam; Parvathy Geetha	2:07.036	QF
3	Thailand (THA); Pornnapphan Phuangmaiming; Panwad Thongnim	2:08.693	QF
4	Macau (MAC); Sam Cheng; Wong Cheok Io	2:29.293	

=== Final ===
Rank	Team	Time
1st place, gold medalist(s)	China (CHN); Yin Mengdie; Wang Nan	1:49.944
2nd place, silver medalist(s)	Kazakhstan (KAZ); Olga Shmelyova; Irina Podoinikova	1:51.251
3rd place, bronze medalist(s)	Uzbekistan (UZB); Ekaterina Shubina; Arina Tanatmisheva	1:52.832
4	Singapore (SGP); Stephenie Chen; Soh Sze Ying	1:54.975
5	Iran (IRI); Hedieh Kazemi; Elnaz Shafieian	1:57.826
6	South Korea (KOR); Choi Ran; Lee Ha-lin	1:58.019
7	Vietnam (VIE); Đỗ Thị Thanh Thảo; Hoàng Thị Hường	2:00.150
8	Thailand (THA); Pornnapphan Phuangmaiming; Panwad Thongnim	2:01.512
9	India (IND); Binita Chanu Oinam; Parvathy Geetha	2:07.440
