= Canoeing at the 2022 Asian Games – Women's K-4 500 metres =

Women's K-4 500 metres at the 2022 Asian Games
- Venue: Fuyang Water Sports Centre
- Date: 3 October 2023
- Competitors: 32 from 8 nations

Medalists
gold medal	China; Li Dongyin, Yin Mengdie, Wang Nan, Sun Yuewen
silver medal	South Korea; Choi Ran, Lee Han-sol, Jo Shin-young, Lee Ha-lin
bronze medal	Uzbekistan; Shakhrizoda Mavlonova, Arina Tanatmisheva, Ekaterina Shubina, Yuliya Borzova

The women's sprint K-4 (kayak four) 500 metres competition at the 2022 Asian Games was held on 3 October 2023.

== Schedule ==
All times are China Standard Time (UTC+08:00)

Date	Time	Event
Tuesday, 3 October 2023	11:45	Final

== Results ==
Rank	Team	Time
1st place, gold medalist(s)	China (CHN); Li Dongyin; Yin Mengdie; Wang Nan; Sun Yuewen	1:39.960
2nd place, silver medalist(s)	South Korea (KOR); Choi Ran; Lee Han-sol; Jo Shin-young; Lee Ha-lin	1:42.870
3rd place, bronze medalist(s)	Uzbekistan (UZB); Shakhrizoda Mavlonova; Arina Tanatmisheva; Ekaterina Shubina; Yuliya Borzova	1:42.958
4	Kazakhstan (KAZ); Olga Shemelyova; Tatyana Tokarnitskaya; Darya Petrova; Stella Sukhanova	1:43.994
5	Iran (IRI); Elnaz Shafieian; Kiana Kamalzadeh; Hedieh Kazemi; Narjes Kargarpour	1:46.942
6	Vietnam (VIE); Đỗ Thị Thanh Thảo; Lương Thị Dung; Hoàng Thị Hường; Đinh Thị Trang	1:49.703
7	Thailand (THA); Mingkamon Phromsri; Suthasinee Autnun; Pornnapphan Phuangmaiming; Panwad Thongnim	1:53.776
8	India (IND); Soniya Devi Phairembam; Parvathy Geetha; Binita Chanu Oinam; Dimita Devi Toijam	1:55.420
