= Canoeing at the 2022 Asian Games – Men's C-2 1000 metres =

Men's C-2 1000 metres at the 2022 Asian Games
- Venue: Fuyang Water Sports Centre
- Date: 3 October 2023
- Competitors: 16 from 8 nations

Medalists
gold medal	Shokhmurod Kholmurodov; Nurislom Tukhtasin Ugli	Uzbekistan
silver medal	Timofey Yemelyanov; Sergey Yemelyanov	Kazakhstan
bronze medal	Arjun Singh; Sunil Singh Salam	India

The men's sprint C-2 (canoe double) 1000 metres competition at the 2022 Asian Games was held on 3 October 2023.

== Schedule ==
All times are China Standard Time (UTC+08:00)

Date	Time	Event
Tuesday, 3 October 2023	10:50	Final

== Results ==
Rank	Team	Time
1st place, gold medalist(s)	Uzbekistan (UZB); Shokhmurod Kholmurodov; Nurislom Tukhtasin Ugli	3:43.796
2nd place, silver medalist(s)	Kazakhstan (KAZ); Timofey Yemelyanov; Sergey Yemelyanov	3:49.991
3rd place, bronze medalist(s)	India (IND); Arjun Singh; Sunil Singh Salam	3:53.329
4	Iran (IRI); Mohammad Nabi Rezaei; Kia Eskandani	3:55.301
5	Vietnam (VIE); Phạm Hồng Quân; Hiên Năm	3:58.596
6	South Korea (KOR); Hwang Seon-hong; Kim Yi-yeol	4:03.026
7	Tajikistan (TJK); Mukhammadi Rajabov; Bobojon Bobojonov	4:07.136
8	Thailand (THA); Anusit Somrup; Kritsana Chuangchan	4:26.028
