= Canoeing at the 2022 Asian Games – Women's slalom C-1 =

Women's C-1 at the 2022 Asian Games
- Venue: Fuyang Water Sports Centre
- Date: 5–7 October 2023
- Competitors: 6 from 5 nations

Medalists
gold medal	Huang Juan	China
silver medal	Anastassiya Ananyeva	Kazakhstan
bronze medal	Haruka Okazaki	Japan

The women's slalom C-1 (canoe single) competition at the 2022 Asian Games took place from 5 to 7 October 2023. Each National Olympic Committee (NOC) could enter two athletes, but only one could advance to the final.

== Schedule ==
All times are China Standard Time (UTC+08:00)

Date	Time	Event
Thursday, 5 October 2023	10:28	Heats 1st
Thursday, 5 October 2023	15:38	Heats 2nd
Saturday, 7 October 2023	09:00	Semifinal
Saturday, 7 October 2023	14:00	Final

== Results ==
=== Heats 1st ===
Rank	Athlete	Time	Pen.	Total
1	Huang Juan (CHN)	103.21	2	105.21
2	Haruka Okazaki (JPN)	110.96	2	112.96
3	Atcharaporn Duanglawa (THA)	116.44	0	116.44
4	Chen Wei-han (TPE)	114.64	2	116.64
5	Anastassiya Ananyeva (KAZ)	114.92	2	116.92
6	Kanda Chomkogsung (THA)	134.41	156	290.41

=== Heats 2nd ===
Rank	Athlete	Time	Pen.	Total
1	Anastassiya Ananyeva (KAZ)	106.34	4	110.34
2	Kanda Chomkogsung (THA)	127.35	4	131.35
3	Chen Wei-han (TPE)	107.13	104	211.13

=== Semifinal ===
Rank	Athlete	Time	Pen.	Total
1	Huang Juan (CHN)	109.29	4	113.29
2	Anastassiya Ananyeva (KAZ)	113.32	2	115.32
3	Atcharaporn Duanglawa (THA)	129.20	0	129.20
4	Kanda Chomkogsung (THA)	149.65	6	155.65
5	Chen Wei-han (TPE)	119.59	52	171.59
6	Haruka Okazaki (JPN)	114.99	100	214.99

=== Final ===
Rank	Athlete	Time	Pen.	Total
1st place, gold medalist(s)	Huang Juan (CHN)	107.71	0	107.71
2nd place, silver medalist(s)	Anastassiya Ananyeva (KAZ)	117.29	2	119.29
3rd place, bronze medalist(s)	Haruka Okazaki (JPN)	119.59	0	119.59
4	Atcharaporn Duanglawa (THA)	126.56	0	126.56
5	Chen Wei-han (TPE)	124.54	52	176.54
