= Canoeing at the 2026 Asian Games – Women's K-2 500 metres =

Women's K-2 500 metres at the 2026 Asian Games
- Venue: Miyoshi Lake
- Date: 23–24 September 2026
- Competitors: 22 from 11 nations

Medalists
gold medal	Yu Shimeng; Yin Mengdie	China
silver medal	Olga Shmelyova; Tatyana Tokarnitskaya	Kazakhstan
bronze medal	Arina Tanatmisheva; Ekaterina Shubina	Uzbekistan

The women's sprint K-2 (kayak double) 500 metres competition at the 2026 Asian Games was held on 23 and 25 September 2026.

== Schedule ==
All times are Japan Standard Time (UTC+09:00)

Date	Time	Event
Wednesday, 23 September 2026	10:50	Heats
Thursday, 24 September 2026	10:20	Semifinal
Thursday, 24 September 2026	11:50	Final

== Results ==
=== Heats ===
- Qualification: 1–3 → Final (QF), Rest → Semifinal (QS)

==== Heat 1 ====
Rank	Team	Time	Notes
1	Kazakhstan (KAZ); Olga Shmelyova; Tatyana Tokarnitskaya	1:47.718	QF
2	Uzbekistan (UZB); Arina Tanatmisheva; Ekaterina Shubina	1:49.096	QF
3	South Korea (KOR); Jo Shin-young; Kim Soh-ryun	1:52.435	QF
4	Indonesia (INA); Stevani Maysche Ibo; Ramla Baharuddin	1:55.066	QS
5	Vietnam (VIE); Bùi Mai Hạnh; Hoàng Thị Lâm	1:58.132	QS
6	India (IND); Soniya Devi Phairembam; Parvathy Geetha	2:02.538	QS

==== Heat 2 ====
Rank	Team	Time	Notes
1	China (CHN); Yu Shimeng; Yin Mengdie	1:45.331	QF
2	Japan (JPN); Maya Hosomi; Juri Urada	1:50.252	QF
3	Iran (IRI); Elnaz Shafieian Noveir; Narjes Kargarpoor	1:52.939	QF
4	Singapore (SGP); Grace Ng; Georgia Ng	1:59.237	QS
5	Thailand (THA); Panwad Thongnim; Pornnapphan Phuangmaiming	2:02.383	QS

=== Semifinal ===
- Qualification: 1–3 → Final (QF)

Rank	Athlete	Time	Notes
1	Indonesia (INA); Stevani Maysche Ibo; Ramla Baharuddin	1:54.493	QF
2	Thailand (THA); Panwad Thongnim; Pornnapphan Phuangmaiming	1:55.417	QF
3	Singapore (SGP); Grace Ng; Georgia Ng	1:57.722	QF
4	Vietnam (VIE); Bùi Mai Hạnh; Hoàng Thị Lâm	2:00.608	
5	India (IND); Soniya Devi Phairembam; Parvathy Geetha	2:01.020	

=== Final ===
Rank	Athlete	Time	Notes
1st place, gold medalist(s)	China (CHN); Stevani Maysche Ibo; Ramla Baharuddin	1:45.010	
2nd place, silver medalist(s)	Kazakhstan (KAZ); Olga Shmelyova; Tatyana Tokarnitskaya	1:48.140	
3rd place, bronze medalist(s)	Uzbekistan (UZB); Arina Tanatmisheva; Ekaterina Shubina	1:49.585	
4	South Korea (KOR); Jo Shin-young; Kim Soh-ryun	1:53.229	
5	Iran (IRI); Elnaz Shafieian Noveir; Narjes Kargarpoor	1:54.636	
6	Indonesia (INA); Stevani Maysche Ibo; Ramla Baharuddin	1:57.578	
7	Singapore (SGP); Grace Ng; Georgia Ng	1:57.834	
8	Thailand (THA); Panwad Thongnim; Pornnapphan Phuangmaiming	2:01.033	
	Japan (JPN); Maya Hosomi; Juri Urada	DNF	
