= Bárbara Pardo =

Spanish canoeist (born 1999)

Personal information
- Born: 8 December 1999 (age 26)

Sport
- Country: Spain
- Sport: Sprint kayak
- Event: K–4 500 m
Medal record
Women's sprint kayak
Representing Spain
World Championships
Gold medal – first place	2025 Milan	K-4 500 m
Silver medal – second place	2026 Poznań	K-4 500 m
Bronze medal – third place	2023 Duisburg	K-2 Mix 500 m
European Championships
Gold medal – first place	2026 Montemor-o-Velho	K-4 500 m
Silver medal – second place	2025 Racice	K-4 500 m

Bárbara Pardo (born 8 December 1999) is a Spanish sprint canoeist.

== Career ==
Pardo competed at the 2023 ICF Canoe Sprint World Championships and won a bronze medal in the mixed K-2 500 metres, along with Íñigo Peña. In August 2025, she competed at the 2025 ICF Canoe Sprint World Championships and won a gold medal in the K-4 500 metres with a time of 1:18.93. This was Spain's first gold medal in the event.
