= Lucía Val =

Spanish canoeist (born 2004)

Personal information
- Full name: Lucía Val Cerdeira
- Born: 9 February 2004 (age 22)

Sport
- Country: Spain
- Sport: Sprint kayak
- Event: K–4 500 m
Medal record
Women's sprint kayak
Representing Spain
World Championships
Gold medal – first place	2025 Milan	K-4 500 m
Silver medal – second place	2026 Poznań	K-4 500 m
European Championships
Gold medal – first place	2026 Montemor-o-Velho	K-4 500 m
Silver medal – second place	2025 Racice	K-4 500 m

Lucía Val Cerdeira (Note: In this Spanish name, the first or paternal surname is Val and the second or maternal family name is Cerdeira.) (born 9 February 2004) is a Spanish sprint canoeist.

== Career ==
In August 2025, Val competed at the 2025 ICF Canoe Sprint World Championships and won a gold medal in the K-4 500 metres with a time of 1:18.93. This was Spain's first gold medal in the event.
