= Canoeing at the 2022 Asian Games – Men's slalom K-1 =

Men's K-1 at the 2022 Asian Games
- Venue: Fuyang Water Sports Centre
- Date: 5–7 October 2023
- Competitors: 16 from 10 nations

Medalists
gold medal	Quan Xin	China
silver medal	Yuuki Tanaka	Japan
bronze medal	Wu Shao-hsuan	Chinese Taipei

The men's slalom K-1 (kayak single) competition at the 2022 Asian Games was held from 5 to 7 October 2023. Each NOC could enter two athletes but only one of them could advance to the final.

== Schedule ==
All times are China Standard Time (UTC+08:00)

Date	Time	Event
Thursday, 5 October 2023	10:48	Heats 1st
Thursday, 5 October 2023	15:52	Heats 2nd
Saturday, 7 October 2023	09:25	Semifinal
Saturday, 7 October 2023	14:22	Final

== Results ==
=== Heats 1st ===
Rank	Athlete	Time	Pen.	Total
1	Yuuki Tanaka (JPN)	87.55	0	87.55
2	Quan Xin (CHN)	85.80	2	87.80
3	Kosuke Saito (JPN)	91.29	4	95.29
4	Djanibek Temirgaliev (UZB)	95.26	2	97.26
5	Imangali Mambetov (KAZ)	99.12	0	99.12
6	Alexandr Korobov (KAZ)	97.61	2	99.61
7	Piyanath Koetsuk (THA)	102.20	4	106.20
8	Janyawut Mangjit (THA)	105.49	2	107.49
9	Shakhobiddin Boltaboev (UZB)	104.76	4	108.76
10	Hitesh Kewat (IND)	116.24	0	116.24
11	Shubham Kewat (IND)	137.96	2	139.96
12	Wu Shao-hsuan (TPE)	92.13	50	142.13
13	Park Moo-rim (KOR)	119.10	56	175.10
14	Ganesh Gurung (NEP)	125.36	60	185.36
15	Baek Seo-jin (KOR)	136.86	108	244.86
16	Leung Tsz Chun (HKG)	180.41	156	336.41

=== Heats 2nd ===
Rank	Athlete	Time	Pen.	Total
1	Wu Shao-hsuan (TPE)	94.25	2	96.25
2	Shakhobiddin Boltaboev (UZB)	100.32	4	104.32
3	Hitesh Kewat (IND)	115.03	4	119.03
4	Shubham Kewat (IND)	114.98	8	122.98
5	Park Moo-rim (KOR)	128.35	2	130.35
6	Baek Seo-jin (KOR)	127.97	4	131.97
7	Ganesh Gurung (NEP)	124.47	105	230.47
8	Leung Tsz Chun (HKG)	171.69	66	237.69

=== Semifinal ===
Rank	Athlete	Time	Pen.	Total
1	Quan Xin (CHN)	96.01	0	96.01
2	Wu Shao-hsuan (TPE)	98.66	0	98.66
3	Yuuki Tanaka (JPN)	98.44	2	100.44
4	Djanibek Temirgaliev (UZB)	104.30	2	106.30
5	Shakhobiddin Boltaboev (UZB)	102.45	4	106.45
6	Kosuke Saito (JPN)	105.31	2	107.31
7	Alexandr Korobov (KAZ)	111.96	0	111.96
8	Piyanath Koetsuk (THA)	111.10	2	113.10
9	Imangali Mambetov (KAZ)	110.02	4	114.02
10	Hitesh Kewat (IND)	117.68	6	123.68
11	Shubham Kewat (IND)	130.01	6	136.01
12	Janyawut Mangjit (THA)	105.12	50	155.12
13	Baek Seo-jin (KOR)	152.85	10	162.85
14	Ganesh Gurung (NEP)	141.99	58	199.99
15	Park Moo-rim (KOR)	134.92	102	236.92
16	Leung Tsz Chun (HKG)	176.55	150	326.55

=== Final ===
Rank	Athlete	Time	Pen.	Total
1st place, gold medalist(s)	Quan Xin (CHN)	89.24	0	89.24
2nd place, silver medalist(s)	Yuuki Tanaka (JPN)	92.15	0	92.15
3rd place, bronze medalist(s)	Wu Shao-hsuan (TPE)	97.12	0	97.12
4	Djanibek Temirgaliev (UZB)	97.51	2	99.51
5	Alexandr Korobov (KAZ)	103.41	2	105.41
6	Piyanath Koetsuk (THA)	107.50	0	107.50
7	Hitesh Kewat (IND)	128.34	2	130.34
8	Ganesh Gurung (NEP)	140.44	6	146.44
9	Baek Seo-jin (KOR)	135.73	52	187.73
10	Leung Tsz Chun (HKG)	171.31	60	231.31
