= Canoeing at the 2022 Asian Games – Men's K-1 1000 metres =

Men's K-1 1000 metres at the 2022 Asian Games
- Venue: Fuyang Water Sports Centre
- Date: 30 September – 2 October 2023
- Competitors: 13 from 13 nations

Medalists
gold medal	Zhang Dong	China
silver medal	Shakhriyor Makhkamov	Uzbekistan
bronze medal	Kirill Tubayev	Kazakhstan

The men's sprint K-1 (kayak single) 1000 metres competition at the 2022 Asian Games was held on 30 September and 2 October 2023.

== Schedule ==
All times are China Standard Time (UTC+08:00)

Date	Time	Event
Saturday, 30 September 2023	09:30	Heats
Saturday, 30 September 2023	15:00	Semifinal
Monday, 2 October 2023	10:00	Final

== Results ==
=== Heats ===
- Qualification: 1–3 → Final (QF), Rest → Semifinal (QS)

==== Heat 1 ====
Rank	Athlete	Time	Notes
1	Zhang Dong (CHN)	3:47.118	QF
2	Shakhriyor Makhkamov (UZB)	3:52.568	QF
3	Rodion Tuigunov (KGZ)	3:54.145	QF
4	Sulaiman Ahmed (IRQ)	3:54.412	QS
5	Park Ju-hyeon (KOR)	4:01.563	QS
6	Natthaphat Chaijantuek (THA)	4:27.198	QS
7	Mohammad Yasin Hosseini (AFG)	4:42.432	QS

==== Heat 2 ====
Rank	Athlete	Time	Notes
1	Ali Aghamirzaei (IRI)	3:49.603	QF
2	Kirill Tubayev (KAZ)	3:51.925	QF
3	Lucas Teo (SGP)	3:55.893	QF
4	Abdusattor Gafurov (TJK)	4:08.442	QS
5	Rapik Saputra (INA)	4:10.231	QS
6	Cheung Tsz Chung (HKG)	4:11.243	QS

=== Semifinal ===
- Qualification: 1–3 → Final (QF)

Rank	Athlete	Time	Notes
1	Sulaiman Ahmed (IRQ)	4:05.545	QF
2	Park Ju-hyeon (KOR)	4:10.063	QF
3	Cheung Tsz Chung (HKG)	4:16.122	QF
4	Rapik Supatra (INA)	4:18.417	
5	Abdusattor Gafurov (TJK)	4:19.197	
6	Natthaphat Chaijantuek (THA)	4:40.004	
7	Mohammad Yasin Hosseini (AFG)	4:44.422	

=== Final ===
Rank	Athlete	Time
1st place, gold medalist(s)	Zhang Dong (CHN)	3:46.224
2nd place, silver medalist(s)	Shakhriyor Makhkamov (UZB)	3:49.978
3rd place, bronze medalist(s)	Kirill Tubayev (KAZ)	3:51.399
4	Ali Aghamirzaei (IRI)	3:53.255
5	Lucas Teo (SGP)	3:56.235
6	Sulaiman Ahmed (IRQ)	3:58.641
7	Rodion Tuigunov (KGZ)	4:01.581
8	Park Ju-hyeon (KOR)	4:02.955
9	Cheung Tsz Chung (HKG)	4:16.775
