= Canoeing at the 2026 Asian Games – Men's K-2 500 metres =

Men's K-2 500 metres at the 2026 Asian Games
- Venue: Miyoshi Lake
- Date: 23–25 September 2026
- Competitors: 28 from 14 nations

Medalists
| gold medal | Cho Gwang-hee; Kim Hyo-bin | South Korea |
| silver medal | Taishi Tanada; Masaya Tanaka | Japan |
| bronze medal | Ali Aghamirzaei; Peyman Ghavidel | Iran |

The men's sprint K-2 (kayak double) 500 metres competition at the 2026 Asian Games was held on 23 and 25 September 2026.

== Schedule ==
All times are Japan Standard Time (UTC+09:00)

| Date | Time | Event |
|---|---|---|
| Wednesday, 23 September 2026 | 14:10 | Heats |
| Friday, 25 September 2026 | 10:00 | Semifinal |
| Friday, 25 September 2026 | 11:20 | Final B |
| Friday, 25 September 2026 | 11:30 | Final A |

== Results ==
=== Heats ===
- Qualification: 1–3 → Final (QF), Rest → Semifinal (QS)

==== Heat 1 ====
| Rank | Team | Time | Notes |
|---|---|---|---|
| 1 | Japan (JPN); Taishi Tanada; Masaya Tanaka | 1:32.899 | QF |
| 2 | South Korea (KOR); Cho Gwang-hee; Kim Hyo-bin | 1:33.250 | QF |
| 3 | Iran (IRI); Ali Aghamirzaei; Peyman Ghavidel | 1:33.569 | QF |
| 4 | Uzbekistan (UZB); Ziyodbek Yuldashaliev; Shakhriyor Makhkamov | 1:38.422 | QS |
| 5 | Vietnam (VIE); Huỳnh Cao Minh; Nguyễn Minh Tuấn | 1:40.863 | QS |
| 6 | Singapore (SGP); Brandon Ooi; Alden Ler | 2:05.709 | QS |
| 7 | Mongolia (MGL); Erdembayar Enkhbat; Khuslenbayar Sainjargal | 2:45.877 | QS |

==== Heat 2 ====
| Rank | Team | Time | Notes |
|---|---|---|---|
| 1 | Kazakhstan (KAZ); Bekarys Ramatulla; Dmitriy Kholmogorov | 1:36.181 | QF |
| 2 | Chinese Taipei (TPE); Lin Yong-bo; Lin Yung-chieh | 1:36.490 | QF |
| 3 | Kyrgyzstan (KGZ); Erlan Sultangaziev; Rysbek Tolomushev | 1:38.636 | QF |
| 4 | Indonesia (INA); Dede Sunandar; Wandi | 1:39.009 | QS |
| 5 | India (IND); Prasanna Kumar C. S. Prohit Baroi | 1:41.141 | QS |
| 6 | Thailand (THA); Aditep Srichart; Nathaworn Waenphrom | 1:42.920 | QS |
| 7 | Hong Kong (HKG); Cheung Tsz Chung; So Pak Yin | 1:51.652 | QS |

=== Semifinal ===
- Qualification: 1–3 → Final (QF)

| Rank | Athlete | Time | Notes |
|---|---|---|---|
| 1 | Uzbekistan (UZB); Ziyodbek Yuldashaliev; Shakhriyor Makhkamov | 1:37.685 | FA |
| 2 | Singapore (SGP); Brandon Ooi; Alden Ler | 1:38.409 | FA |
| 3 | Vietnam (VIE); Huỳnh Cao Minh; Nguyễn Minh Tuấn | 1:38.449 | FA |
| 4 | Indonesia (INA); Dede Sunandar; Wandi | 1:38.559 | FB |
| 5 | India (IND); Prasanna Kumar C. S. Prohit Baroi | 1:40.308 | FB |
| 6 | Thailand (THA); Aditep Srichart; Nathaworn Waenphrom | 1:43.605 | FB |
| 7 | Hong Kong (HKG); Cheung Tsz Chung; So Pak Yin | 1:50.567 | FB |
| | Mongolia (MGL); Erdembayar Enkhbat; Khuslenbayar Sainjargal | DNF | |

=== Finals ===
==== Final B ====
| Rank | Athlete | Time | Notes |
|---|---|---|---|
| 1 | Indonesia (INA); Dede Sunandar; Wandi | 1:37.767 | |
| 2 | Thailand (THA); Aditep Srichart; Nathaworn Waenphrom | 1:40.178 | |
| 3 | India (IND); Prasanna Kumar C. S. Prohit Baroi | 1:40.411 | |
| 4 | Hong Kong (HKG); Cheung Tsz Chung; So Pak Yin | 1:45.551 | |

==== Final A ====
| Rank | Athlete | Time | Notes |
|---|---|---|---|
| 1st place, gold medalist(s) | South Korea (KOR); Cho Gwang-hee; Kim Hyo-bin | 1:31.859 | |
| 2nd place, silver medalist(s) | Japan (JPN); Taishi Tanada; Masaya Tanaka | 1:32.176 | |
| 3rd place, bronze medalist(s) | Iran (IRI); Ali Aghamirzaei; Peyman Ghavidel | 1:32.869 | |
| 4 | Kazakhstan (KAZ); Bekarys Ramatulla; Dmitriy Kholmogorov | 1:35.365 | |
| 5 | Chinese Taipei (TPE); Lin Yong-bo; Lin Yung-chieh | 1:35.385 | |
| 6 | Singapore (SGP); Brandon Ooi; Alden Ler | 1:37.514 | |
| 7 | Uzbekistan (UZB); Ziyodbek Yuldashaliev; Shakhriyor Makhkamov | 1:38.253 | |
| 8 | Kyrgyzstan (KGZ); Erlan Sultangaziev; Rysbek Tolomushev | 1:38.620 | |
| 9 | Vietnam (VIE); Huỳnh Cao Minh; Nguyễn Minh Tuấn | 1:42.173 | |
