= Canoeing at the 2026 Asian Games – Men's K-4 500 metres =

Men's K-4 500 metres at the 2026 Asian Games
- Venue: Miyoshi Lake
- Date: 23–24 September 2026
- Competitors: 40 from 10 nations

Medalists
| gold medal | Cho Gwang-hee; Kim Hyo-bin; Jang Sang-won; Choi Min-kyu | South Korea |
| silver medal | Liang Fengwei; Ding Shengkai; Chen Weiyang; Wang Jinwei | China |
| bronze medal | Masaya Tanaka; Akihiro Inoue; Ryuji Matsushiro; Yuito Sakai | Japan |

The men's sprint K-4 (kayak four) 500 metres competition at the 2026 Asian Games was held on 23 and 24 September 2026.

== Schedule ==
All times are Japan Standard Time (UTC+09:00)

| Date | Time | Event |
|---|---|---|
| Wednesday, 23 September 2026 | 10:00 | Heats |
| Thursday, 24 September 2026 | 10:10 | Semifinal |
| Thursday, 24 September 2026 | 11:40 | Final |

== Results ==
=== Heats ===
- Qualification: 1–3 → Final (QF), Rest → Semifinal (QS)

==== Heat 1 ====
| Rank | Team | Time | Notes |
|---|---|---|---|
| 1 | China (CHN); Liang Fengwei; Ding Shengkai; Chen Weiyang; Wang Jinwei | 1:23.853 | QF |
| 2 | Kyrgyzstan (KGZ); Erlan Sultangaziev; Urmat Ymanbekov; Rysbek Tolomushev; Rodion Tuigunov | 1:26.325 | QF |
| 3 | India (IND); Laitonjam Naocha Singh; Varinder Singh; Oinam Arun Singh; Harshwardhan Singh Shaktawat | 1:29.447 | QF |
| 4 | Singapore (SGP); Brandon Ooi; Alden Ler; Oliver Euan Bowhay; Sean Teo Wei Jie | 1:29.944 | QS |
| 5 | Thailand (THA); Nathaworn Waenphrom; Praison Buasamrong; Natthaphat Chaichanthuek; Aditep Srichart | 1:31.229 | QS |

==== Heat 2 ====
| Rank | Team | Time | Notes |
|---|---|---|---|
| 1 | South Korea (KOR); Cho Gwang-hee; Kim Hyo-bin; Jang Sang-won; Choi Min-kyu | 1:25.383 | QF |
| 2 | Kazakhstan (KAZ); Zhakhongir Zhamedov; Artyom Terechshenko; Igor Ryashentsev; Denis Klenin | 1:27.046 | QF |
| 3 | Japan (JPN); Masaya Tanaka; Akihiro Inoue; Ryuji Matsushiro; Yuito Sakai | 1:27.078 | QF |
| 4 | Indonesia (INA); Subhi; Dede Sunandar; Indra Hidayat; Wandi | 1:29.762 | QS |
| 5 | Hong Kong (HKG); Chang Long Yin; Cheung Tsz Chung; Lo Wai Lok; So Pak Yin | 1:37.374 | QS |

=== Semifinal ===
- Qualification: 1–3 → Final (FA)

| Rank | Team | Time | Notes |
|---|---|---|---|
| 1 | Indonesia (INA); Subhi; Dede Sunandar; Indra Hidayat; Wandi | 1:30.208 | FA |
| 2 | Singapore (SGP); Brandon Ooi; Alden Ler; Oliver Euan Bowhay; Sean Teo Wei Jie | 1:31.952 | FA |
| 3 | Thailand (THA); Nathaworn Waenphrom; Praison Buasamrong; Natthaphat Chaichanthuek; Aditep Srichart | 1:33.234 | FA |
| 4 | Hong Kong (HKG); Chang Long Yin; Cheung Tsz Chung; Lo Wai Lok; So Pak Yin | 1:35.859 | X |

=== Final ===
| Rank | Team | Time | Notes |
|---|---|---|---|
| 1st place, gold medalist(s) | South Korea (KOR); Cho Gwang-hee; Kim Hyo-bin; Jang Sang-won; Choi Min-kyu | 1:22.587 | |
| 2nd place, silver medalist(s) | China (CHN); Liang Fengwei; Ding Shengkai; Chen Weiyang; Wang Jinwei | 1:22.842 | |
| 3rd place, bronze medalist(s) | Japan (JPN); Masaya Tanaka; Akihiro Inoue; Ryuji Matsushiro; Yuito Sakai | 1:25.909 | |
| 4 | Kazakhstan (KAZ); Zhakhongir Zhamedov; Artyom Terechshenko; Igor Ryashentsev; Denis Klenin | 1:26.156 | |
| 5 | Kyrgyzstan (KGZ); Erlan Sultangaziev; Urmat Ymanbekov; Rysbek Tolomushev; Rodion Tuigunov | 1:26.341 | |
| 6 | Singapore (SGP); Brandon Ooi; Alden Ler; Oliver Euan Bowhay; Sean Teo Wei Jie | 1:28.298 | |
| 7 | India (IND); Laitonjam Naocha Singh; Varinder Singh; Oinam Arun Singh; Harshwardhan Singh Shaktawat | 1:28.982 | |
| 8 | Indonesia (INA); Subhi; Dede Sunandar; Indra Hidayat; Wandi | 1:29.112 | |
| 9 | Thailand (THA); Nathaworn Waenphrom; Praison Buasamrong; Natthaphat Chaichanthuek; Aditep Srichart | 1:30.599 | |
