= Masaya Tanaka =

Japanese sprint canoeist

Personal information
- Native name: 田中 政弥
- Nationality: Japanese
- Born: March 4, 2001 (age 25) Japan

Sport
- Sport: Canoe sprint
Medal record
Men's canoe sprint
Representing Japan
Asian Canoe Sprint Championships
Bronze medal – third place	2025 Nanchang	K-4 500 m
Bronze medal – third place	2026 Hefei	K-4 500 m
Asian Games
Silver medal – second place	2026 Aichi–Nagoya	K-2 500 m
Bronze medal – third place	2026 Aichi–Nagoya	K-4 500 m

Masaya Tanaka (Japanese: 田中 政弥, romanized: Tanaka Masaya; born 4 March 2001) is a Japanese sprint canoeist who competes in kayak events. He represents Japan in international canoe sprint competitions and is affiliated with the Japan Self-Defense Forces Physical Training School.

== Career ==
Tanaka competed at the 2025 Asian Canoe Sprint Championships in Nanchang, China. He was part of the Japanese crew that won the bronze medal in the men's K-4 500 metres, alongside Ryuji Matsushiro, Akihiro Inoue and Taishi Tanada.

At the 2026 Asian Canoe Sprint Championships in Hefei, China, Tanaka again won bronze in the men's K-4 500 metres as part of the Japanese team. He also competed in the men's K-1 5000 metres, finishing fifth.

Tanaka represented Japan at the 2026 Asian Games in Aichi and Nagoya. In the men's K-4 500 metres, he won the bronze medal with Ryuji Matsushiro, Akihiro Inoue and Yuito Sakai, recording a time of 1:25.909.

On 25 September 2026, Tanaka and Taishi Tanada won silver in the men's K-2 500 metres. They finished in 1:32.176, 0.317 seconds behind South Korea's Cho Gwang-hee and Kim Hyo-bin.
