= Huang Juan =

Chinese canoeist

Personal information
- Born: 14 August 2002 (age 24) China

Sport
- Sport: Canoe slalom
- Event: C1
- Club: Guizhou Province
Medal record
Women's canoe slalom
Representing China
Asian Games
Gold medal – first place	2022 Hangzhou	C1
Gold medal – first place	2026 Aichi–Nagoya	C1
Asian Championships
Gold medal – first place	2023 Tokyo	C1

Huang Juan (born 14 August 2002) is a Chinese slalom canoeist.

She competed at the 2024 Summer Olympics in Paris, where she finished 15th in the C1 event.
