= Haruka Okazaki =

Japanese canoeist

Personal information
- Born: 3 July 1998 (age 28) Japan

Sport
- Sport: Canoe slalom
- Event: C1, K1, Kayak cross
Medal record
Women's canoe slalom
Representing Japan
Asian Games
Bronze medal – third place	2022 Hangzhou	C1
Asian Championships
Gold medal – first place	2016 Toyama	K1 team

Haruka Okazaki (born 3 July 1998) is a Japanese canoeist who has competed at the international level since 2013.

She competed at the 2024 Summer Olympics in Paris finishing 20th in the C1 event and 37th in kayak cross.
