= Arjun Singh (canoeist) =

Personal information
- Nationality: Indian

Sport
- Sport: Canoeing
Medal record
Representing India
Canoeing
Bronze medal – third place	2022 Hangzhou	Men's sprint C-2 1000 m

Arjun Singh is an Indian canoeist. He won a bronze medal, alongside Sunil Singh Salam, at the men's sprint C-2 1000 m event at the 2022 Asian Games.
