= Sunil Singh Salam =

Indian canoeist

Personal information
- Nationality: Indian

Sport
- Sport: Canoeing
Medal record
Men's sprint canoe
Representing India
Asian Games
Bronze medal – third place	2022 Hangzhou	C-2 1000 m
Asian Championships
Bronze medal – third place	2017 Shanghai	C-4 200 m
Bronze medal – third place	2017 Shanghai	C-4 500 m

Sunil Singh Salam is an Indian canoeist. He won a bronze medal, alongside Arjun Singh at the men's sprint C-2 1000 m event at the 2022 Asian Games.
