= Yuuki Tanaka (canoeist) =

Japanese canoeist

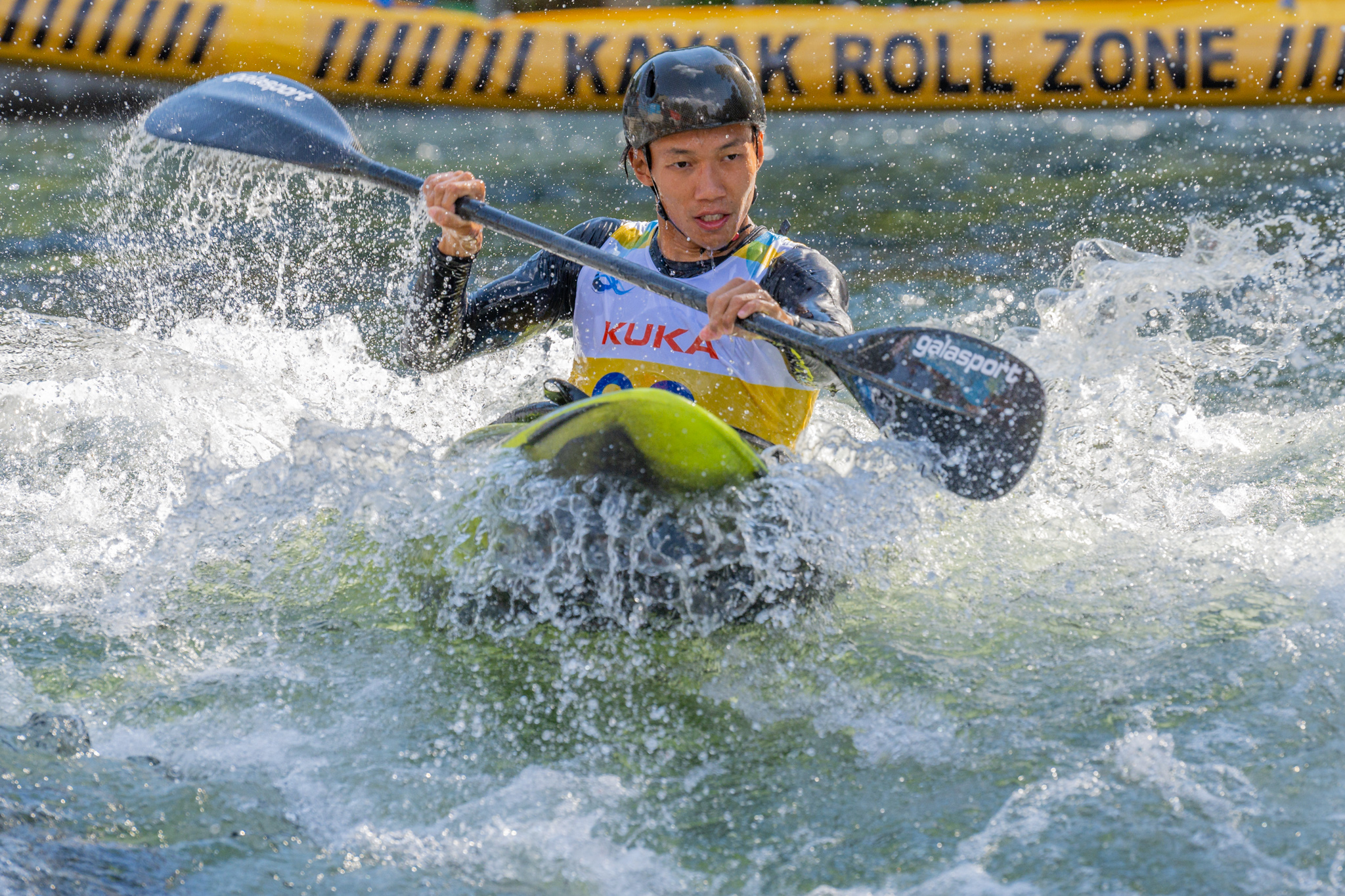
- Tanaka in 2022

Personal information
- Born: 12 November 2001 (age 24)

Sport
- Sport: Canoe slalom
- Event: K1, kayak cross
Medal record
Men's canoe slalom
Representing Japan
World Championships
Silver medal – second place	2025 Penrith	K1 team
Asian Games
Silver medal – second place	2022 Hangzhou	K1
Silver medal – second place	2026 Aichi–Nagoya	K1
Asian Championships
Gold medal – first place	2023 Tokyo	K1

Yuuki Tanaka (born 12 November 2001) is a Japanese slalom canoeist who has competed at the international level since 2018, specializing in K1 and kayak cross.

He won a silver medal in the K1 team event at the 2025 World Championships in Penrith. It was the first ever medal for Japan at the ICF Canoe Slalom World Championships.

Tanaka competed at the 2024 Summer Olympics, finishing 14th in the K1 event and 20th in kayak cross.
