= Andrey Yerguchyov =

Kazakhstani canoeist (born 1995)

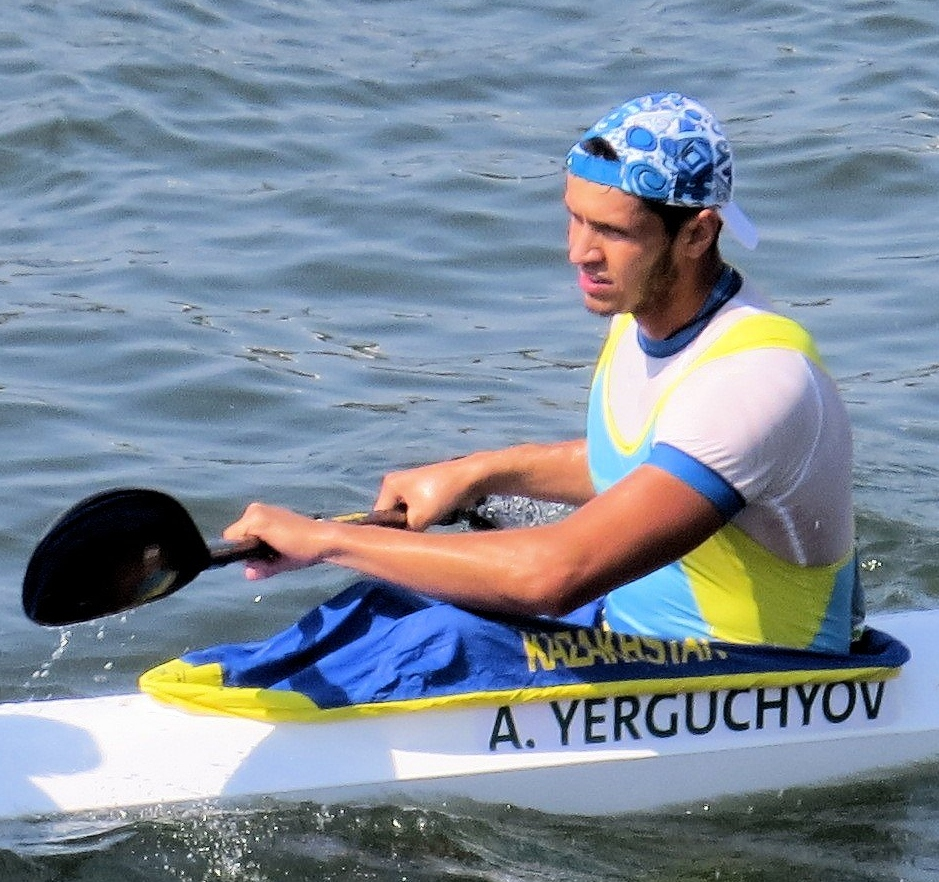
- Yerguchyov at the 2016 Olympics

Personal information
- Born: 23 April 1995 (age 31)
- Education: West Kazakhstan Academy for the Humanities
- Height: 188 cm (6 ft 2 in)
- Weight: 100 kg (220 lb)

Sport
- Sport: Canoe sprint
- Club: School of Supreme Sports Skill, Oral
- Coached by: Alexander Akunishnikov (personal); Andrey Shantarovich (national)
Medal record
Men's canoe sprint
Representing Kazakhstan
Asian Games
| Gold medal – first place | 2014 Incheon | K-4 1000 m |
Asian Championships
| Gold medal – first place | 2017 Shanghai | K-2 1000 m |
| Gold medal – first place | 2017 Shanghai | K-4 500 m |
| Bronze medal – third place | 2017 Shanghai | K-4 1000 m |

Andrey Yerguchyov (Russian: Андрей Ергучев, born 23 April 1995) is a Kazakhstani canoeist. Competing in the four-man K-4 1000 m event he won a gold medal at the 2014 Asian Games and placed tenth at the 2016 Olympics. At the Rio Olympics he also finished 12th in the K-2 200 m event.
