= Taishi Tanada =

Japanese sprint canoeist

Personal information
- Nationality: Japanese
- Born: July 17, 1997 (age 29)

Sport
- Sport: Canoe sprint
Medal record
Men's canoe sprint
Representing Japan
Asian Games
Bronze medal – third place	2022 Hangzhou	K-4 500 m
Silver medal – second place	2026 Aichi–Nagoya	K-2 500 m
Asian Canoe Sprint Championships
Bronze medal – third place	2026 Hefei	K-1 500 m

Taishi Tanada (Japanese: 棚田 大志; born 17 July 1997) is a Japanese sprint canoeist who competes in kayak events. He represents Japan in international canoe sprint competitions and is affiliated with Mera Electric Industry Co., Ltd.

== Career ==
Tanada represented Japan in the men's K-4 500 metres at the 2022 Asian Games in Hangzhou, China. Alongside Keiji Mizumoto, Akihiro Inoue and Seiji Komatsu, he won the bronze medal in the event, finishing behind China and South Korea.

In April 2026, Tanada competed at the Asian Canoe Sprint Championships in Hefei, China. He won the bronze medal in the men's K-1 500 metres with a time of 1:45.598. He also reached the final of the men's K-1 200 metres, finishing fourth. The Japan Canoe Federation had selected him for the Japanese national team for the championships.

At the 2026 Asian Games in Aichi and Nagoya, Japan, Tanada competed in the men's K-1 500 metres and K-2 500 metres. He finished fifth in the K-1 event. In the K-2 500 metres, partnering Masaya Tanaka, he won the silver medal with a time of 1:32.176. The Japanese pair finished behind South Korea's Cho Gwang-hee and Kim Hyo-bin. The Japanese Olympic Committee's athlete profile lists both his 2022 Asian Games bronze and 2026 Asian Games silver among his international results.
