= Quan Xin =

Chinese slalom canoeist (born 1996)

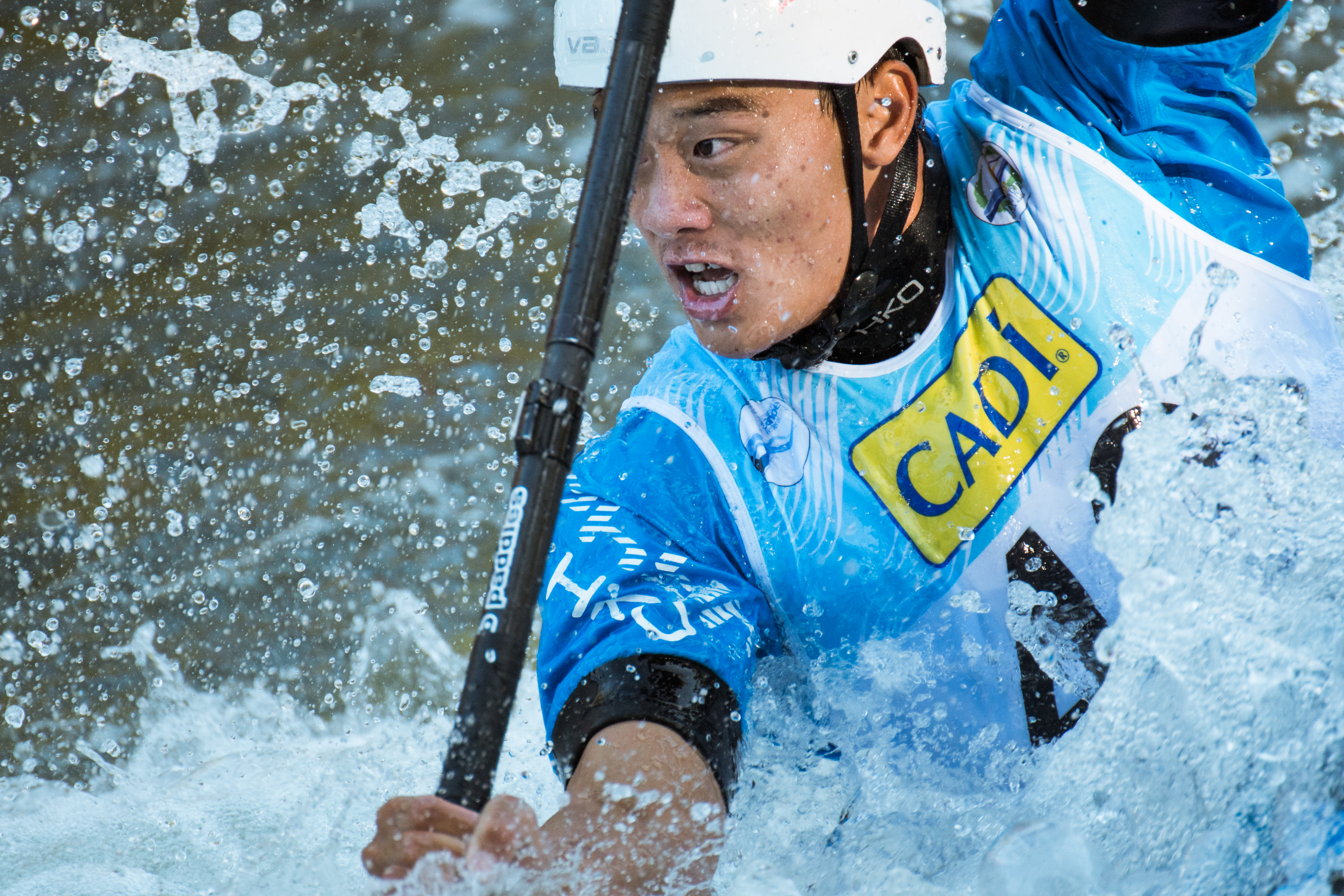
- Quan at the 2019 Canoe Slalom World Championships.

Personal information
- Born: November 24, 1996 (age 29) Wuyishan, Fujian, China
- Education: Jimei University

Sport
- Sport: Canoe slalom
- Coached by: Guo Xudong
Medal record
Representing China
Asian Games
Gold medal – first place	2018 Jakarta-Palembang	K1
Gold medal – first place	2022 Hangzhou	K1
Asian Championships
Silver medal – second place	2016 Toyama	K1
Silver medal – second place	2016 Toyama	K1 team

Quan Xin (Chinese: 全鑫; pinyin: Quán Xīn; born November 24, 1996) is a Chinese slalom canoeist who has competed at the international level since 2015, specializing in K1 and kayak cross.

He won a gold medal in the K1 event at the 2018 and 2022 Asian Games and a silver in the same event at the 2016 Asian Championships.

Quan participated at the delayed 2020 Summer Olympics in Tokyo, where he finished 17th in the K1 event after being eliminated in the semifinal. He also competed at the 2024 Summer Olympics in Paris, finishing 11th in the K1 event and 26th in kayak cross.
