= Yin Mengdie =

Chinese canoeist (born 1997)

Personal information
- Born: 17 November 1997 (age 28)
- Height: 1.72 m (5 ft 8 in) (2022)

Sport
- Country: China
- Sport: Canoe sprint
Medal record
Women's canoe sprint
Representing China
World Championships
Gold medal – first place	2026 Poznań	K-4 500 m
Silver medal – second place	2026 Poznań	K-2 500 m
Asian Games
Gold medal – first place	2022 Hangzhou	K-2 500 m
Gold medal – first place	2022 Hangzhou	K-4 500 m
Gold medal – first place	2026 Aichi–Nagoya	K-2 500 m
Gold medal – first place	2026 Aichi–Nagoya	K-4 500 m

Yin Mengdie (殷梦蝶, born 17 November 1997) is a Chinese canoeist. She competed in the women's K-1 200 metres and the K-1 500 metres events at the 2020 Summer Olympics.
