= Wang Nan (canoeist) =

Chinese canoeist (born 2000)

Personal information
- Born: 25 September 2000 (age 26)
- Height: 1.70 m (5 ft 7 in) (2022)

Sport
- Country: China
- Sport: Canoe sprint
Medal record
Women's canoe sprint
Representing China
World Championships
Gold medal – first place	2025 Milan	K-1 200 m
Gold medal – first place	2026 Poznań	K-4 500 m
Silver medal – second place	2025 Milan	K-4 500 m
Asian Championships
Gold medal – first place	2025 Nanchang	K-1 200 m
Gold medal – first place	2025 Nanchang	K-1 500 m
Asian Games
Gold medal – first place	2022 Hangzhou	K-2 500 m
Gold medal – first place	2022 Hangzhou	K-4 500 m
Gold medal – first place	2026 Aichi–Nagoya	K-4 500 m

Wang Nan (born 25 September 2000) is a Chinese canoeist. She qualified in the women's K-2 500 metres and women's K-4 500 metres events at the 2020 Summer Olympics.
