= 2022 ICF Canoe Sprint World Championships – Women's K-2 500 metres =

Women's K-2 500 metres at the 2022 ICF Canoe Sprint World Championships
- Venue: Lake Banook
- Location: Dartmouth, Canada
- Dates: 4–6 August
- Competitors: 44 from 22 nations
- Winning time: 1:49.87

Medalists
gold medal	Karolina Naja; Anna Puławska	Poland
silver medal	Paulina Paszek; Jule Hake	Germany
bronze medal	Hermien Peters; Lize Broekx	Belgium

The women's K-2 500 metres competition at the 2022 ICF Canoe Sprint World Championships in Dartmouth took place on Lake Banook.

== Schedule ==
The schedule is as follows:

Date	Time	Round
Thursday 4 August 2022	14:30	Heats
Friday 5 August 2022	16:06	Semifinals
Saturday 6 August 2022	10:35	Final B
Saturday 6 August 2022	12:47	Final A

== Results ==
=== Heats ===
The fastest boat in each heat advanced directly to the final.
The next six fastest boats in each heat advanced to the semifinals.

==== Heat 1 ====
Rank	Canoeist	Country	Time	Notes
1	Karolina Naja; Anna Puławska	Poland	1:48.67	QA
2	Andreanne Langlois; Toshka Hrebacka	Canada	1:52.30	QS
3	Karina Alanis; Maricela Montemayor	Mexico	1:53.41	QS
4	Deborah Kerr; Emma Russell	Great Britain	1:53.87	QS
5	Kateřina Zárubová; Barbora Betlachová	Czech Republic	1:55.20	QS
6	Manon Hostens; Léa Jamelot	France	1:57.09	QS
7	Kaitlyn McElroy; Emma McDonald	United States	2:03.06	QS

==== Heat 2 ====
Rank	Canoeist	Country	Time	Notes
1	Hermien Peters; Lize Broekx	Belgium	1:50.10	QA
2	Frederikke Matthiesen; Bolette Iversen	Denmark	1:50.51	QS
3	Wang Nan; Sun Yuewen	China	1:53.84	QS
4	Linnea Stensils; Moa Wikberg	Sweden	1:54.04	QS
5	Maria Garro; Brenda Rojas	Argentina	1:56.68	QS
6	Selma Konijn; Ruth Vorsselman	Netherlands	1:57.16	QS
7	Sara Mihalik; Netta Malinen	Finland	1:57.33	QS
8	Malina Trifescu; Laura Plesca	Romania	2:02.54	

==== Heat 3 ====
Rank	Canoeist	Country	Time	Notes
1	Paulina Paszek; Jule Hake	Germany	1:49.03	QA
2	Alicia Hoskin; Lisa Carrington	New Zealand	1:51.31	QS
3	Blanka Kiss; Anna Lucz	Hungary	1:52.61	QS
4	Agata Fantini; Mathilde Rosa	Italy	1:55.32	QS
5	Anastasiya Horlova; Liudmyla Kuklinovska	Ukraine	1:55.85	QS
6	Aida Bauza; Begona Lazkano	Spain	1:56.53	QS
7	Soh Sze; Chen Jiexian	Singapore	1:57.24	QS

=== Semifinals ===
The fastest three boats in each semi advanced to the A final.
The next four fastest boats in each semi, plus the fastest remaining boat advanced to the B final.

==== Semifinal 1 ====
Rank	Canoeist	Country	Time	Notes
1	Deborah Kerr; Emma Russell	Great Britain	1:49.65	QA
2	Andreanne Langlois; Toshka Hrebacka	Canada	1:49.73	QA
3	Manon Hostens; Léa Jamelot	Slovenia	1:51.06	QA
4	Blanka Kiss; Anna Lucz	Hungary	1:51.15	QB
5	Wang Nan; Sun Yuewen	China	1:51.23	QB
6	Maria Garro; Brenda Rojas	Argentina	2:00.40	QB
7	Aida Bauza; Begona Lazkano	Spain	1:52.21	QB
8	Agata Fantini; Mathilde Rosa	Italy	1:53.37	qB

==== Semifinal 2 ====
Rank	Canoeist	Country	Time	Notes
1	Alicia Hoskin; Lisa Carrington	New Zealand	1:57.39	QA
2	Frederikke Matthiesen; Bolette Iversen	Denmark	1:58.37	QA
3	Linnea Stensils; Moa Wikberg	Sweden	1:58.77	QA
4	Kateřina Zárubová; Barbora Betlachová	Czech Republic	1:59.29	QB
5	Selma Konijn; Ruth Vorsselman	Netherlands	1:51.83	QB
6	Karina Alanis; Maricela Montemayor	Mexico	1:52.52	QB
7	Anastasiya Horlova; Liudmyla Kuklinovska	Ukraine	1:52.71	QB
8	Soh Sze; Chen Jiexian	Singapore	1:55.43	

=== Finals ===
==== Final B ====
Competitors in this final raced for positions 10 to 18.

Rank	Canoeist	Country	Time
1	Karina Alanis; Maricela Montemayor	Mexico	1:52.48
2	Selma Konijn; Ruth Vorsselman	Netherlands	1:52.62
3	Anastasiya Horlova; Liudmyla Kuklinovska	Ukraine	1:52.79
4	Kateřina Zárubová; Barbora Betlachová	Czech Republic	1:53.33
5	Maria Garro; Brenda Rojas	Argentina	1:53.61
6	Agata Fantini; Mathilde Rosa	Italy	1:54.02
7	Aida Bauza; Begona Lazkano	Spain	1:54.52
8	Wang Nan; Sun Yuewen	China	1:55.91
9	Blanka Kiss; Anna Lucz	Hungary	1:56.64

==== Final A ====
Competitors in this final raced for positions 1 to 9, with medals going to the top three.

Rank	Canoeist	Country	Time
1st place, gold medalist(s)	Karolina Naja; Anna Puławska	Poland	1:49.87
2nd place, silver medalist(s)	Paulina Paszek; Jule Hake	Germany	1:50.28
3rd place, bronze medalist(s)	Hermien Peters; Lize Broekx	Belgium	1:52.64
4	Alicia Hoskin; Lisa Carrington	New Zealand	1:52.67
5	Deborah Kerr; Emma Russell	Great Britain	1:54.15
6	Frederikke Matthiesen; Bolette Iversen	Denmark	1:54.63
7	Manon Hostens; Léa Jamelot	France	1:55.84
8	Linnea Stensils; Moa Wikberg	Sweden	1:55.86
9	Andreanne Langlois; Toshka Hrebacka	Canada	1:56.79
