= 2021 ICF Canoe Sprint World Championships – Mixed K-2 200 metres =

Mixed K-2 200 metres at the 2021 ICF Canoe Sprint World Championships
- Venue: Lake Bagsværd
- Location: Copenhagen, Denmark
- Dates: 18–19 September
- Competitors: 40 from 20 nations
- Winning time: 33.94

Medalists
gold medal	Anna Lucz; Kolos Csizmadia	Hungary
silver medal	Messiah Baptista; Francisca Laia	Portugal
bronze medal	Marta Walczykiewicz; Bartosz Grabowski	Poland

The mixed K-2 200 metres competition at the 2021 ICF Canoe Sprint World Championships in Copenhagen took place on Lake Bagsværd.

== Schedule ==
The schedule was as follows:

Date	Time	Round
Saturday 18 September 2021	15:10	Heats
Saturday 18 September 2021	16:10	Semifinals
Sunday 19 September 2021	13:10	Final B
Sunday 19 September 2021	13:18	Final A

All times are Central European Summer Time (UTC+2)

== Results ==
=== Heats ===
Heat winners advanced directly to the A final.
The next six fastest boats in each heat advanced to the semifinals.

==== Heat 1 ====
Rank	Kayakers	Country	Time	Notes
1	Marta Walczykiewicz; Bartosz Grabowski	Poland	34.46	QA
2	Linnea Stensils; Petter Menning	Sweden	34.89	QS
3	Natalia Podolskaya; Alexander Dyachenko	RCF	35.25	QS
4	Francesca Genzo; Andrea Di Liberto	Italy	35.30	QS
5	Cathrine Rask; Nicolai Winther	Denmark	36.91	QS
6	Vanina Paoletti; Jérémy Leray	France	38.03	QS
7	Esti Olivier; Chrisjan Coetzee	South Africa	38.64	QS

==== Heat 2 ====
Rank	Kayakers	Country	Time	Notes
1	Anna Lucz; Kolos Csizmadia	Hungary	34.36	QA
2	Sara Ouzande; Carlos Garrote	Spain	34.99	QS
3	Kostja Stroinski; Paulina Paszek	Germany	35.25	QS
4	Mariia Kichasova-Skoryk; Igor Trunov	Ukraine	35.99	QS
–	Brandon Ooi; Soh Sze Ying	Singapore	DSQ	
–	Anja Osterman; Vid Debeljak	Slovenia	DNS	

==== Heat 3 ====
Rank	Kayakers	Country	Time	Notes
1	Messiah Baptista; Francisca Laia	Portugal	34.91	QA
2	Milica Novaković; Marko Novaković	Serbia	36.32	QS
3	Aliaksei Misiuchenka; Uladzislava Skryhanava	Belarus	36.69	QS
4	Jakub Zavřel; Anežka Paloudová	Czech Republic	36.82	QS
5	Olimpiya Dusheva; Denislav Tsvetanov	Bulgaria	36.92	QS
6	Hakeem Teland; Thea Røsten	Norway	40.12	QS
7	Natalie Davison; Mitchell Barran	Canada	40.32	QS

=== Semifinals ===
Qualification was as follows:

The fastest three boats in each semi advanced to the A final.
The next four fastest boats in each semi, plus the fastest remaining boat advanced to the B final.

==== Semifinal 1 ====
Rank	Kayakers	Country	Time	Notes
1	Kostja Stroinski; Paulina Paszek	Germany	35.34	QA
2	Mariia Kichasova-Skoryk; Igor Trunov	Ukraine	35.34	QA
3	Vanina Paoletti; Jérémy Leray	France	35.40	QA
4	Milica Novaković; Marko Novaković	Serbia	35.79	QB
5	Jakub Zavřel; Anežka Paloudová	Czech Republic	36.02	QB
6	Natalia Podolskaya; Alexander Dyachenko	RCF	36.06	QB
7	Cathrine Rask; Nicolai Winther	Denmark	36.36	QB
8	Natalie Davison; Mitchell Barran	Canada	39.44	qB

==== Semifinal 2 ====
Rank	Kayakers	Country	Time	Notes
1	Linnea Stensils; Petter Menning	Sweden	34.66	QA
2	Sara Ouzande; Carlos Garrote	Spain	34.75	QA
3	Aliaksei Misiuchenka; Uladzislava Skryhanava	Belarus	34.98	QA
4	Francesca Genzo; Andrea Di Liberto	Italy	35.27	QB
5	Olimpiya Dusheva; Denislav Tsvetanov	Bulgaria	35.72	QB
6	Hakeem Teland; Thea Røsten	Norway	36.46	QB
7	Esti Olivier; Chrisjan Coetzee	South Africa	40.34	QB

=== Finals ===
==== Final B ====
Competitors in this final raced for positions 10 to 18.

Rank	Kayakers	Country	Time
1	Olimpiya Dusheva; Denislav Tsvetanov	Bulgaria	35.81
2	Francesca Genzo; Andrea Di Liberto	Italy	35.83
3	Jakub Zavřel; Anežka Paloudová	Czech Republic	36.68
4	Natalia Podolskaya; Alexander Dyachenko	RCF	36.76
5	Cathrine Rask; Nicolai Winther	Denmark	37.02
6	Hakeem Teland; Thea Røsten	Norway	37.47
7	Esti Olivier; Chrisjan Coetzee	South Africa	39.12
8	Natalie Davison; Mitchell Barran	Canada	40.05
–	Milica Novaković; Marko Novaković	Serbia	SO

==== Final A ====
Competitors raced for positions 1 to 9, with medals going to the top three.

Rank	Kayakers	Country	Time
1st place, gold medalist(s)	Anna Lucz; Kolos Csizmadia	Hungary	33.94
2nd place, silver medalist(s)	Messiah Baptista; Francisca Laia	Portugal	34.34
3rd place, bronze medalist(s)	Marta Walczykiewicz; Bartosz Grabowski	Poland	34.35
4	Sara Ouzande; Carlos Garrote	Spain	34.41
5	Linnea Stensils; Petter Menning	Sweden	34.47
6	Mariia Kichasova-Skoryk; Igor Trunov	Ukraine	34.87
7	Aliaksei Misiuchenka; Uladzislava Skryhanava	Belarus	34.99
8	Kostja Stroinski; Paulina Paszek	Germany	35.02
9	Vanina Paoletti; Jérémy Leray	France	35.28
