= 2026 ICF Canoe Sprint World Championships – Women's K-2 500 metres =

Women's K-2 500 metres at the 2026 ICF Canoe Sprint World Championships
- Venue: Lake Malta
- Location: Poznań, Poland
- Dates: 26-30 August
- Competitors: 50 from 25 nations
- Winning time: 1:39.54

Medalists
gold medal	Kailey Harlen; Natalia Drobot	Australia
silver medal	Shimeng Yu; Mengdie Yin	China
bronze medal	Paulina Paszek; Pauline Jagsch	Germany

The women's K-2 500 metres competition at the 2026 ICF Canoe Sprint World Championships in Poznań took place at Lake Malta.

== Schedule ==
The schedule is as follows:

Date	Time	Round
Thursday 27 August 2026		Heats
Saturday 29 August 2026		Semifinals
Sunday 30 August 2026		Final B
Sunday 30 August 2026		Final A

== Record ==
The best performance previously in this discipline was:

Women's K-2 500 metres
World Best	1:35.78	Lisa Carrington; Caitlin Regal (NZL)	Tokyo (Japan)

=== Heats ===
Three heats were held. The results of the heats were as follows:

Qualification rule : Winner in each heat to the final: Next six in each heat qualify for semi-finals; remainder are eliminated.

Heat 1

Rank	Lane	Nation	Athletes	Time	Gap	Notes
1	5	Poland	Martyna Klatt; Anna Pulawska	1:50.16		FA
2	6	Netherlands	Selma Konijn; Ruth Vorsselman	1:50.84	0.68	SF
3	4	Italy	Lucrezia Zironi; Giada Rossetti	1:51.35	1.19	SF
4	1	AIN	Lizaveta Vilkova; Alina Svita	1:52.77	2.61	SF
5	3	Argentina	Brenda Rojas; Maria Magdalena Garro	1:53.19	3.03	SF
6	7	Mexico	Karina Alanis Morales; Maricela Montemayor Rodriguez	1:54.74	4.58	SF
7	2	Czech Republic	Anezka Paloudova; Zuzana Hanusova	1:57.34	7.18	SF
8	8	Ukraine	Diana Rybak; Snizhana Stalinova	1:57.51	7.35	
9	9	Japan	Honami Tohda; Yui Taniguchi	2:04.55	14.39	

Heat 2

Rank	Lane	Nation	Athletes	Time	Gap	Notes
1	5	Australia	Kailey Harlen; Natalia Drobot	1:50.27		FA
2	4	Slovenia	Anja Apollonio; Mia Medved	1:57.18	6.91	SF
3	6	Spain	Estefania Fernandez; Begona Lazkano	1:57.74	7.47	SF
4	8	Portugal	Ana Brito; Clara Duarte	1:58.83	8.56	SF
5	2	Serbia	Marija Dostanic; Dunja Stanojev	1:59.48	9.21	SF
6	7	Canada	Callie Loch; Michelle Russell	2:01.73	11.46	SF
7	3	Denmark	Sara Corfixsen Milthers; Bolette Nyvang Iversen	2:03.84	13.57	SF
	1	Indonesia	Ramla Baharuddin; Stevani Maysche Ibo	DNS		

Heat 3

Rank	Lane	Nation	Athletes	Time	Gap	Notes
1	6	China	Shimeng Yu; Mengdie Yin	1:51.20		FA
2	5	Germany	Paulina Paszek; Pauline Jagsch	1:52.08	0.88	SF
3	3	Belgium	Hermien Peters; Lize Broekx	1:53.42	2.22	SF
4	4	Sweden	Melina Andersson; Julia Lagerstam	1:54.22	3.02	SF
5	1	Kazakhstan	Olga Shmelyova; Tatyana Tokarnitskaya	1:55.26	4.06	SF
6	2	Uzbekistan	Ekaterina Shubina; Arina Tanatmisheva	1:56.07	4.87	SF
7	8	Hungary	Bianka Vivien Hofer; Flora Tolgyesi	1:56.26	5.06	SF
8	7	United States	Arezou Motamedi; Elena Wolgamot	1:58.23	7.03	

=== Semi finals ===
Two semifinal swere held. The Results of the semi finals were as follows:

Qualification rule : First three in each heat to A final: Next four in each heat plus next best boat on time to B final.

Semifinal 1

Rank	Lane	Nation	Athletes	Time	Gap	Notes
1	5	Germany	Paulina Paszek; Pauline Jagsch	1:40.13		FA
2	6	Italy	Lucrezia Zironi; Giada Rossetti	1:41.56	1.43	FA
3	4	Spain	Estefania Fernandez; Begona Lazkano	1:42.58	2.45	FA
4	9	Mexico	Karina Alanis Morales; Maricela Montemayor Rodriguez	1:42.63	2.5	FB
5	1	Hungary	Bianka Vivien Hofer; Flora Tolgyesi	1:42.92	2.79	FB
6	2	Argentina	Brenda Rojas; Maria Magdalena Garro	1:43.49	3.36	FB
7	3	Sweden	Melina Andersson; Julia Lagerstam	1:43.85	3.72	FB
8	7	Portugal	Ana Brito; Clara Duarte	1:44.40	4.27	qBT
9	8	Canada	Callie Loch; Michelle Russell	1:47.14	7.01	

Semifinal 2

Rank	Lane	Nation	Athletes	Time	Gap	Notes
1	6	Belgium	Hermien Peters; Lize Broekx	1:41.54		FA
2	5	Netherlands	Selma Konijn; Ruth Vorsselman	1:42.21	0.67	FA
3	3	Neutral Athletes B	Lizaveta Vilkova; Alina Svita	1:43.31	1.77	FA
4	1	Denmark	Sara Corfixsen Milthers; Bolette Nyvang Iversen	1:43.69	2.15	FB
5	4	Slovenia	Anja Apollonio; Mia Medved	1:45.33	3.79	FB
6	2	Kazakhstan	Olga Shmelyova; Tatyana Tokarnitskaya	1:45.83	4.29	FB
7	7	Serbia	Marija Dostanic; Dunja Stanojev	1:46.43	4.89	FB
8	9	Czech Republic	Anezka Paloudova; Zuzana Hanusova	1:46.44	4.9	
9	8	Uzbekistan	Ekaterina Shubina; Arina Tanatmisheva	1:49.95	8.41	

=== Finals ===
The results of the finals were as follows:

B final

Rank	Lane	Nation	Athletes	Time	Gap	Notes
1	3	Slovenia	Anja Apollonio; Mia Medved	1:46.81		
2	5	Denmark	Sara Corfixsen Milthers; Bolette Nyvang Iversen	1:46.98	+0.17	
3	4	Mexico	Karina Alanis Morales; Maricela Montemayor Rodriguez	1:47.14	+0.33	
4	8	Sweden	Melina Andersson; Julia Lagerstam	1:47.15	+0.34	
5	2	Argentina	Brenda Rojas; Maria Magdalena Garro	1:47.68	+0.87	
6	6	Hungary	Bianka Vivien Hofer; Flora Tolgyesi	1:47.78	+0.97	
7	1	Portugal	Ana Brito; Clara Duarte	1:48.28	+1.47	
8	7	Kazakhstan	Olga Shmelyova; Tatyana Tokarnitskaya	1:48.65	+1.84	
9	9	Serbia	Marija Dostanic; Dunja Stanojev	1:50.40	+3.59	

A final

Rank	Lane	Nation	Athletes	Time	Gap	Notes
1st place, gold medalist(s)	5	Australia	Kailey Harlen; Natalia Drobot	1:39.54		
2nd place, silver medalist(s)	4	China	Shimeng Yu; Mengdie Yin	1:41.19	+1.65	
3rd place, bronze medalist(s)	7	Germany	Paulina Paszek; Pauline Jagsch	1:41.20	+1.66	
4	2	Italy	Lucrezia Zironi; Giada Rossetti	1:42.14	+2.60	
5	3	Belgium	Hermien Peters; Lize Broekx	1:42.52	+2.98	
6	8	Netherlands	Selma Konijn; Ruth Vorsselman	1:43.14	+3.60	
7	6	Poland	Martyna Klatt; Anna Pulawska	1:43.23	+3.69	
8	1	Neutral Athletes B	Lizaveta Vilkova; Alina Svita	1:44.56	+5.02	
9	9	Spain	Estefania Fernandez; Begona Lazkano	1:45.21	+5.67	
