= 2023 ICF Canoe Sprint World Championships – Women's K-2 500 metres =

Women's K-2 500 metres at the 2023 ICF Canoe Sprint World Championships
- Venue: Sportpark Duisburg
- Location: Duisburg, Germany
- Dates: 24-27 August
- Competitors: 70 from 35 nations
- Winning time: 1:39.856

Medalists
gold medal	Emma Jørgensen; Frederikke Matthiesen	Denmark
silver medal	Martyna Klatt; Helena Wiśniewska	Poland
bronze medal	Paulina Paszek; Jule Hake	Germany

The women's K-2 500 metres competition at the 2023 ICF Canoe Sprint World Championships in Duisburg took place in Sportpark Duisburg.

== Schedule ==
The schedule is as follows:

Date	Time	Round
Thursday 24 August 2023	10:43	Heats
Saturday 26 August 2023	16:02	Semifinals
Sunday 27 August 2023	10:46	Final B
Sunday 27 August 2023	12:08	Final A

== Results ==
=== Heats ===
The six fastest boats in each heat and three fastest 7th ranked boats advanced to the semi finals.

==== Heat 1 ====
Rank	Canoeist	Country	Time	Notes
1	Martyna Klatt; Helena Wiśniewska	Poland	1:41.671	QS
2	Aimee Fisher; Danielle McKenzie	New Zealand	1:42.137	QS
3	Manon Hostens; Vanina Paoletti	France	1:42.767	QS
4	Sara Daldoss; Lucrezia Zironi	Italy	1:42.887	QS
5	Courtney Stott; Madeline Schmidt	Canada	1:43.163	QS
6	Ekaterina Shubina; Arina Tanatmisheva	Uzbekistan	1:45.217	QS
7	Melanija Čamane; Krista Bērziņa	Latvia	1:46.433	QS
8	Elena Wolgamot; Kali Wilding	United States	1:47.025	
9	Binita Chanu Oinam; Parvathy Geetha	India	1:57.139	

==== Heat 2 ====
Rank	Canoeist	Country	Time	Notes
1	Paulina Paszek; Jule Hake	Germany	1:40.871	QS
2	Diana Tanko; Nataliia Dokiienko	Ukraine	1:43.846	QS
3	Joana Vasconcelos; Francisca Laia	Portugal	1:44.979	QS
4	Katarína Pecsuková; Bianka Sidová	Slovakia	1:45.034	QS
5	Adriana Lehaci; Ana-Roxana Lehaci	Austria	1:45.295	QS
6	Seima Konijn; Ruth Vorsselman	Netherlands	1:46.007	QS
7	Jennifer Egan-Simmons; Eabha Ni Drisceoil	Ireland	1:52.271	
8	Maira Toro; Ysumy Orellana	Chile	1:54.402	
9	Aya Ferfad; Anfel Arabi	Algeria	1:56.928	

==== Heat 3 ====
Rank	Canoeist	Country	Time	Notes
1	Hermien Peters; Lize Broekx	Belgium	1:40.981	QS
2	Emma Jørgensen; Frederikke Matthiesen	Denmark	1:42.673	QS
3	Jiang Han; Liao Mengjiao	China	1:43.441	QS
4	Brenda Rojas; Maria Garro	Argentina	1:43.585	QS
5	Deborah Kerr; Emma Russell	Great Britain	1:43.703	QS
6	Daylen Rodriguez; Yurieni Guerra	Cuba	1:44.530	QS
7	Kateřina Zárubová; Barbora Betlachová	Czech Republic	1:44.550	QS
8	Maya Hosomi; Juri Urada	Japan	1:46.347	
	Yocelin Canache; Milenca Hernandez	Venezuela	DNS	

==== Heat 4 ====
Rank	Canoeist	Country	Time	Notes
1	Linnea Stensils; Moa Wikberg	Sweden	1:41.935	QS
2	Laia Pelachs; Begona Lazkano	Spain	1:42.028	QS
3	Beatriz Briones; Brenda Gutierrez	Mexico	1:42.733	QS
4	Olga Shmelyova; Irina Podoinikova	Kazakhstan	1:43.270	QS
5	Sara Fojt; Noemi Pupp	Hungary	1:43.717	QS
6	Kailey Harlen; Natalia Drobot	Australia	1:43.797	QS
7	Diexe Molina; Tatiana Muñoz	Colombia	1:51.786	QS
8	Liliana Cardenas; Stefanie Perdomo	Ecuador	1:58.981	

=== Semifinals ===
The fastest three boats in each semi advanced to the A final.
The next three fastest boats in each semifinal boats advanced to the B final.

==== Semifinal 1 ====
Rank	Canoeist	Country	Time	Notes
1	Martyna Klatt; Helena Wiśniewska	Poland	1:39.843	QA
2	Emma Jørgensen; Frederikke Matthiesen	Denmark	1:40.209	QA
3	Deborah Kerr; Emma Russell	Great Britain	1:41.624	QA
4	Courtney Stott; Madeline Schmidt	Canada	1:42.460	QB
5	Seima Konijn; Ruth Vorsselman	Netherlands	1:43.132	QB
6	Olga Shmelyova; Irina Podoinikova	Kazakhstan	1:43.230	QB
7	Beatriz Briones; Brenda Gutierrez	Mexico	1:43.615	
8	Kateřina Zárubová; Barbora Betlachová	Czech Republic	1:44.561	
9	Diana Tanko; Nataliia Dokiienko	Ukraine	1:44.681	

==== Semifinal 2 ====
Rank	Canoeist	Country	Time	Notes
1	Paulina Paszek; Jule Hake	Germany	1:39.669	QA
2	Manon Hostens; Vanina Paoletti	France	1:40.788	QA
3	Laia Pelachs; Begona Lazkano	Spain	1:41.127	QA
4	Sara Daldoss; Lucrezia Zironi	Italy	1:42.237	QB
5	Brenda Rojas; Maria Garro	Argentina	1:42.570	QB
6	Jiang Han; Liao Mengjiao	China	1:43.229	QB
7	Melanija Čamane; Krista Bērziņa	Latvia	1:43.704	
8	Adriana Lehaci; Ana-Roxana Lehaci	Austria	1:45.333	
	Kailey Harlen; Natalia Drobot	Australia	DNS	

==== Semifinal 3 ====
Rank	Canoeist	Country	Time	Notes
1	Hermien Peters; Lize Broekx	Belgium	1:40.362	QA
2	Linnea Stensils; Moa Wikberg	Sweden	1:41.438	QA
3	Aimee Fisher; Danielle McKenzie	New Zealand	1:41.537	QA
4	Ekaterina Shubina; Arina Tanatmisheva	Uzbekistan	1:42.653	QB
5	Joana Vasconcelos; Francisca Laia	Portugal	1:42.724	QB
6	Daylen Rodriguez; Yurieni Guerra	Cuba	1:43.549	QB
7	Katarína Pecsuková; Bianka Sidová	Slovakia	1:44.147	
8	Sara Fojt; Noemi Pupp	Hungary	1:47.782	
9	Diexe Molina; Tatiana Muñoz	Colombia	1:50.860	

=== Finals ===
==== Final B ====
Competitors in this final raced for positions 10 to 18.

Rank	Canoeist	Country	Time	Notes
1	Olga Shmelyova; Irina Podoinikova	Kazakhstan	1:43.318	
2	Joana Vasconcelos; Francisca Laia	Portugal	1:44.588	
3	Brenda Rojas; Maria Garro	Argentina	1:44.699	
4	Sara Daldoss; Lucrezia Zironi	Italy	1:44.710	
4	Jiang Han; Liao Mengjiao	China	1:44.710	
6	Ekaterina Shubina; Arina Tanatmisheva	Uzbekistan	1:44.766	
7	Courtney Stott; Madeline Schmidt	Canada	1:44.876	
8	Seima Konijn; Ruth Vorsselman	Netherlands	1:45.031	
9	Daylen Rodriguez Perez; Yurieni Guerra Herrera	Cuba	1:45.201	

==== Final A ====
Competitors in this final raced for positions 1 to 9, with medals going to the top three.

Rank	Canoeist	Country	Time	Notes
1st place, gold medalist(s)	Emma Jørgensen; Frederikke Matthiesen	Denmark	1:39.586	
2nd place, silver medalist(s)	Martyna Klatt; Helena Wiśniewska	Poland	1:40.824	
3rd place, bronze medalist(s)	Paulina Paszek; Jule Hake	Germany	1:41.597	
4	Hermien Peters; Lize Broekx	Belgium	1:42.040	
5	Manon Hostens; Vanina Paoletti	France	1:42.430	
6	Linnea Stensils; Moa Wikberg	Sweden	1:42.477	
7	Laia Pelachs; Begona Lazkano	Spain	1:42.485	
8	Aimee Fisher; Danielle McKenzie	New Zealand	1:42.904	
9	Deborah Kerr; Emma Russell	Great Britain	1:43.117	
