= 2025 ICF Canoe Sprint World Championships – Women's K-2 500 metres =

Women's K-2 500 metres at the 2025 ICF Canoe Sprint World Championships
- Venue: Idroscalo Regatta Course
- Location: Milan, Italy
- Dates: 21–24 August
- Competitors: 58 from 29 nations
- Winning time: 1:41.34

Medalists
gold medal	Martyna Klatt; Anna Puławska	Poland
silver medal	Kailey Harlen; Natalia Drobot	Australia
bronze medal	Paulina Paszek; Pauline Jagsch	Germany

The women's K-2 500 metres competition at the 2025 ICF Canoe Sprint World Championships in Milan took place in Idroscalo Regatta Course.

== Schedule ==
The schedule is as follows:

Date	Time	Round
Thursday 21 August 2025	10:39	Heats
Saturday 23 August 2025	10:40	Semifinals
Sunday 24 August 2025	09:10	Final B
Sunday 24 August 2025	11:01	Final A

== Results ==
=== Heats ===
The fastest six fastest boats (QS) in each heat plus the fastest three remaining boats (qs), advanced to the semi-finals.

==== Heat 1 ====
Rank	Canoeist	Country	Time	Notes
1	Ina Sauchuk; Uladzislava Skryhanava	Individual Neutral Athletes	1:41.52	QS
2	Lisa Carrington; Tara Vaughan	New Zealand	1:42.59	QS
3	Estefanía Fernández; Begoña Lazkano	Spain	1:42.64	QS
4	Karina Alanís; Beatriz Briones	Mexico	1:42.80	QS
5	Maria Virik; Kristine Strand Amundsen	Norway	1:44.43	QS
6	Kristina Armstrong; Deborah Kerr	Great Britain	1:55.98	QS
7	Maya Hosomi; Juri Urada	Japan	1:46.65	qS
8	Choi Ran; Kim So-hyun	South Korea	1:49.47	

==== Heat 2 ====
Rank	Canoeist	Country	Time	Notes
1	Paulina Paszek; Pauline Jagsch	Germany	1:40.92	QS
2	Irene Bellan; Meshua Marigo	Italy	1:42.83	QS
3	Kseniia Lukantseva; Anastasiia Dolgova	Individual Neutral Athletes	1:43.20	QS
4	Frederikke Hauge Matthiesen; Sara Milthers	Denmark	1:44.29	QS
5	Dagmar Čulenová; Katarína Pecsuková	Slovakia	1:44.95	QS
6	Stevani Maysche Ibo; Ramla Baharuddin	Indonesia	1:48.90	QS
7	Soniya Devi Phairembam; Parvathy Geetha	India	1:58.23	

==== Heat 3 ====
Rank	Canoeist	Country	Time	Notes
1	Kailey Harlen; Natalia Drobot	Australia	1:40.77	QS
2	Manon Hostens; Vanina Paoletti	France	1:42.26	QS
3	Li Dongyin; Yu Shimeng	China	1:42.44	QS
4	Blanka Kiss; Anna Lucz	Hungary	1:42.55	QS
5	Anja Osterman; Mia Medved	Slovenia	1:43.16	QS
6	Selma Konijn; Ruth Vorsselman	Netherlands	1:44.87	QS
7	Melānija Čamane; Krista Bērziņa	Latvia	1:46.41	qS

==== Heat 4 ====
Rank	Canoeist	Country	Time	Notes
1	Martyna Klatt; Anna Puławska	Poland	1:42.60	QS
2	Hermien Peters; Lize Broekx	Belgium	1:43.93	QS
3	Kateřina Zárubová; Štěpánka Sobíšková	Czech Republic	1:45.76	QS
4	Riley Melanson; Michelle Russell	Canada	1:46.11	QS
5	Yoana Georgieva; Pamela Ivanova	Bulgaria	1:47.69	QS
6	Diana Rybak; Snizhana Stalinova	Ukraine	1:49.22	QS
7	Emma McDonald; Knytly Sybounmy	United States	1:53.22	qS

=== Semifinals ===
The fastest three boats in each semi advanced to the A final. The next three fastest boats in each semi advanced to the final B.

==== Semifinal 1 ====
Rank	Canoeist	Country	Time	Notes
1	Martyna Klatt; Anna Puławska	Poland	1:40.26	FA
2	Paulina Paszek; Pauline Jagsch	Germany	1:40.83	FA
3	Lisa Carrington; Tara Vaughan	New Zealand	1:41.35	FA
4	Blanka Kiss; Anna Lucz	Hungary	1:42.57	FB
5	Li Dongyin; Yu Shimeng	China	1:44.14	FB
6	Melānija Čamane; Krista Bērziņa	Latvia	1:46.43	FB
7	Kristina Armstrong; Deborah Kerr	Great Britain	1:46.52	
8	Yoana Georgieva; Pamela Ivanova	Bulgaria	1:49.41	
9	Stevani Maysche Ibo; Ramla Baharuddin	Indonesia	1:49.69	

==== Semifinal 2 ====
Rank	Canoeist	Country	Time	Notes
1	Kailey Harlen; Natalia Drobot	Australia	1:41.18	FA
2	Selma Konijn; Ruth Vorsselman	Netherlands	1:42.81	FA
3	Estefanía Fernández; Begoña Lazkano	Spain	1:42.98	FA
4	Hermien Peters; Lize Broekx	Belgium	1:43.05	FB
5	Frederikke Hauge Matthiesen; Sara Milthers	Denmark	1:43.23	FB
6	Kseniia Lukantseva; Anastasiia Dolgova	Individual Neutral Athletes	1:45.83	FB
7	Maria Virik; Kristine Strand Amundsen	Norway	1:46.00	
8	Maya Hosomi; Juri Urada	Japan	1:47.65	
9	Riley Melanson; Michelle Russell	Canada	1:47.89	

==== Semifinal 3 ====
Rank	Canoeist	Country	Time	Notes
1	Manon Hostens; Vanina Paoletti	France	1:42.84	FA
2	Ina Sauchuk; Uladzislava Skryhanava	Individual Neutral Athletes	1:42.87	FA
3	Anja Osterman; Mia Medved	Slovenia	1:43.45	FA
4	Irene Bellan; Meshua Marigo	Italy	1:43.59	FB
5	Karina Alanís; Beatriz Briones	Mexico	1:45.40	FB
6	Dagmar Čulenová; Katarína Pecsuková	Slovakia	1:46.20	FB
7	Kateřina Zárubová; Štěpánka Sobíšková	Czech Republic	1:47.70	
8	Diana Rybak; Snizhana Stalinova	Ukraine	1:52.23	
9	Emma McDonald; Knytly Sybounmy	United States	1:55.87	

=== Finals ===
==== Final B ====
Competitors in this final raced for positions 10 to 18.

Rank	Canoeist	Country	Time	Notes
1	Blanka Kiss; Anna Lucz	Hungary	1:47.94	
2	Hermien Peters; Lize Broekx	Belgium	1:48.25	
3	Li Dongyin; Yu Shimeng	China	1:48.45	
4	Frederikke Hauge Matthiesen; Sara Milthers	Denmark	1:50.41	
5	Karina Alanís; Beatriz Briones	Mexico	1:50.64	
6	Kseniia Lukantseva; Anastasiia Dolgova	Individual Neutral Athletes	1:51.39	
7	Melānija Čamane; Krista Bērziņa	Latvia	1:51.74	
8	Irene Bellan; Meshua Marigo	Italy	1:52.04	
9	Dagmar Čulenová; Katarína Pecsuková	Slovakia	1:53.89	

==== Final A ====
Competitors raced for positions 1 to 9, with medals going to the top three.

Rank	Canoeist	Country	Time	Notes
1st place, gold medalist(s)	Martyna Klatt; Anna Puławska	Poland	1:41.34	
2nd place, silver medalist(s)	Kailey Harlen; Natalia Drobot	Australia	1:41.92	
3rd place, bronze medalist(s)	Paulina Paszek; Pauline Jagsch	Germany	1:43.19	
4	Lisa Carrington; Tara Vaughan	New Zealand	1:43.78	
5	Selma Konijn; Ruth Vorsselman	Netherlands	1:43.92	
6	Anja Osterman; Mia Medved	Slovenia	1:44.30	
7	Ina Sauchuk; Uladzislava Skryhanava	Individual Neutral Athletes	1:44.49	
8	Manon Hostens; Vanina Paoletti	France	1:45.01	
9	Estefanía Fernández; Begoña Lazkano	Spain	1:45.05	
