= 2023 ICF Canoe Sprint World Championships – Women's K-2 200 metres =

Women's K-2 200 metres at the 2023 ICF Canoe Sprint World Championships
- Venue: Sportpark Duisburg
- Location: Duisburg, Germany
- Dates: 23–25 August
- Competitors: 32 from 16 nations
- Winning time: 36.681

Medalists
gold medal	Martyna Klatt; Helena Wiśniewska	Poland
silver medal	Paulina Paszek; Jule Hake	Germany
bronze medal	Blanka Kiss; Anna Lucz	Hungary

The women's K-2 200 metres competition at the 2023 ICF Canoe Sprint World Championships in Duisburg took place in Sportpark Duisburg.

== Schedule ==
The schedule is as follows:

Date	Time	Round
Wednesday 23 August 2023	10:25	Heats
Friday 25 August 2023	11:57	Semifinal
Friday 25 August 2023	17:22	Final A

== Results ==
=== Heats ===
The fastest three boats in each heat advanced directly to the final.
The next four fastest boats in each heat, plus the fastest remaining boat advanced to the semifinal.

==== Heat 1 ====
Rank	Canoeist	Country	Time	Notes
1	Paulina Paszek; Jule Hake	Germany	37.133	QF
2	Martyna Klatt; Helena Wiśniewska	Poland	37.308	QF
3	Linnea Stensils; Moa Wikberg	Sweden	37.762	QF
4	Melanija Čamane; Krista Berzina	Latvia	38.881	QS
5	Maya Hosomi; Juri Urada	Japan	38.922	QS
6	Jennifer Egan-Simmons; Eabha Ni Drisceoil	Ireland	40.619	QS
7	Diexe Molina; Tatiana Muñoz	Colombia	41.280	QS
8	Daniela Castillo; Fernanda Iracheta	Chile	41.502	qS
9	Anfel Arabi; Aya Ferfad	Algeria	43.748	

==== Heat 2 ====
Rank	Canoeist	Country	Time	Notes
1	Blanka Kiss; Anna Lucz	Hungary	37.357	QF
2	Kailey Harlen; Natalia Drobot	Australia	38.050	QF
3	Adriana Lehaci; Ana-Roxana Lehaci	Austria	38.194	QF
4	Diana Rybak; Inna Klinova	Ukraine	38.235	QS
5	Elisa Zapata Jenaro; Mercedes Zapata Jenaro	Spain	38.453	QS
6	Liliana Cardenas; Stefanie Perdomo	Ecuador	42.868	QS
7	Binita Chanu Oinam; Parvathy Geetha	India	43.343	QS

=== Semifinal ===
The fastest three boats advanced to the final.

Rank	Canoeist	Country	Time	Notes
1	Diana Rybak; Inna Klinova	Ukraine	38.693	QF
2	Elisa Zapata Jenaro; Mercedes Zapata Jenaro	Spain	38.894	QF
3	Maya Hosomi; Juri Urada	Japan	39.409	QF
4	Melanija Čamane; Krista Berzina	Latvia	39.489	
5	Jennifer Egan-Simmons; Eabha Ni Drisceoil	Ireland	40.587	
6	Daniela Castillo; Fernanda Iracheta	Chile	41.373	
7	Diexe Molina; Tatiana Muñoz	Colombia	41.513	
8	Binita Chanu Oinam; Parvathy Geetha	India	43.262	
9	Liliana Cardenas; Stefanie Perdomo	Ecuador	44.126	

=== Final ===
Competitors raced for positions 1 to 9, with medals going to the top three.

Rank	Canoeist	Country	Time
1st place, gold medalist(s)	Martyna Klatt; Helena Wiśniewska	Poland	36.681
2nd place, silver medalist(s)	Paulina Paszek; Jule Hake	Germany	36.877
3rd place, bronze medalist(s)	Blanka Kiss; Anna Lucz	Hungary	37.302
4	Linnea Stensils; Moa Wikberg	Sweden	37.425
5	Kailey Harlen; Natalia Drobot	Australia	37.950
6	Diana Rybak; Inna Klinova	Ukraine	37.974
7	Elisa Zapata Jenaro; Mercedes Zapata Jenaro	Spain	38.130
8	Adriana Lehaci; Ana-Roxana Lehaci	Austria	38.143
9	Maya Hosomi; Juri Urada	Japan	39.033
