= Canoe sprint at the 2023 European Games – Women's K-2 500 metres =

Women's K-2 500 metres at the 2023 European Games
- Venue: Kryspinów Waterway
- Date: 21, 23 June
- Competitors: 32 from 16 nations
- Teams: 16
- Winning time: 1:40.952

Medalists
gold medal	Karolina Naja; Anna Puławska	Poland
silver medal	Emma Jørgensen; Frederikke Matthiesen	Denmark
bronze medal	Tamara Csipes; Alida Dóra Gazsó	Hungary

The women's K-2 500 metres canoe sprint competition at the 2023 European Games took place on 21 and 23 June at the Kryspinów Waterway.

== Schedule ==
All times are local (UTC+2).

Date	Time	Round
Wednesday, 21 June 2023	10:39	Heats
Wednesday, 21 June 2023	16:39	Semifinal
Friday, 23 June 2023	14:16	Final

== Results ==
=== Heats ===
==== Heat 1 ====
Rank	Kayakers	Country	Time	Notes
1	Karolina Naja; Anna Puławska	Poland	1:40.890	QF
2	Emma Jørgensen; Frederikke Matthiesen	Denmark	1:41.007	QF
3	Alida Dóra Gazsó; Tamara Csipes	Hungary	1:41.250	QF
4	Linnea Stensils; Moa Wikberg	Sweden	1:42.680	QS
5	Marija Dostanić; Kristina Bedeč	Serbia	1:43.561	QS
6	Adriana Lehaci; Ana Roxana Lehaci	Austria	1:46.964	QS
7	Susanna Cicali; Francesca Genzo	Italy	1:49.464	QS
8	Netta Malkinson; Mia Meizeles	Israel	1:54.775	

==== Heat 2 ====
Rank	Kayakers	Country	Time	Notes
1	Paulina Paszek; Jule Hake	Germany	1:41.250	QF
2	Hermien Peters; Lize Broekx	Belgium	1:41.734	QF
3	Manon Hostens; Vanina Paoletti	France	1:43.140	QF
4	Katarína Pecsuková; Bianka Sidová	Slovakia	1:44.254	QS
5	Melānija Čamane; Krista Bērziņa	Latvia	1:44.654	QS
6	Anna Sletsjøe; Hedda Øritsland	Norway	1:45.034	QS
7	Kateřina Zárubová; Barbora Betlachová	Czech Republic	1:45.354	QS
8	Cristina Franco; Miriam Vega	Spain	1:45.981	qS

=== Semifinal ===
Rank	Kayakers	Country	Time	Notes
1	Linnea Stensils; Moa Wikberg	Sweden	1:44.322	QF
2	Katarína Pecsuková; Bianka Sidová	Slovakia	1:45.102	QF
3	Marija Dostanić; Kristina Bedeč	Serbia	1:45.209	QF
4	Melānija Čamane; Krista Bērziņa	Latvia	1:46.436	
5	Anna Sletsjøe; Hedda Øritsland	Norway	1:47.219	
6	Cristina Franco; Miriam Vega	Spain	1:47.242	
7	Adriana Lehaci; Ana Roxana Lehaci	Austria	1:47.502	
8	Kateřina Zárubová; Barbora Betlachová	Czech Republic	1:47.856	
9	Susanna Cicali; Francesca Genzo	Italy	1:47.942	

=== Final ===
Rank	Kayakers	Country	Time
1st place, gold medalist(s)	Karolina Naja; Anna Puławska	Poland	1:40.952
2nd place, silver medalist(s)	Emma Jørgensen; Frederikke Matthiesen	Denmark	1:41.342
3rd place, bronze medalist(s)	Alida Dóra Gazsó; Tamara Csipes	Hungary	1:42.538
4	Paulina Paszek; Jule Hake	Germany	1:43.304
5	Linnea Stensils; Moa Wikberg	Sweden	1:43.328
6	Hermien Peters; Lize Broekx	Belgium	1:43.768
7	Manon Hostens; Vanina Paoletti	France	1:44.630
8	Marija Dostanić; Kristina Bedeč	Serbia	1:45.688
9	Katarína Pecsuková; Bianka Sidová	Slovakia	1:45.806
