= 2026 ICF Canoe Sprint World Championships – Women's K-1 200 metres =

Women's K-1 200 metres at the 2026 ICF Canoe Sprint World Championships
- Venue: Lake Malta
- Location: Poznań, Poland
- Dates: 26-30 August
- Winning time: 39.71

Medalists
gold medal	Frederikke Mørcke	Denmark
silver medal	Anna Lucz	Hungary
bronze medal	Sara Ouzande	Spain

The women's K-1 200 metres competition at the 2026 ICF Canoe Sprint World Championships in Poznań took place at Lake Malta.

== Schedule ==
The schedule is as follows:

Date	Round
Thursday 27 August 2026	Heats
Saturday 29 August 2026	Semifinals
Sunday 30 August 2026	Final B
Sunday 30 August 2026	Final A

== Record ==
The best performance previously in this discipline was:

World Best	Time	Athlete	Nation	Venue
World Best	37.89	Lisa Carrington	New Zealand	(Russia) Moscow

== Results ==
=== Heats ===
The result of the round of heats was as follows:

Qualification rule: first six boats in each heat, and next three fastest boats, to semifinal; remainder eliminated

Heat 1

Rank	Lane	Athlete	Nation	Time	Gap	Notes
1	5	Sara Ouzande	Spain	42.85		SF
2	4	Katharina Diederichs	Germany	43.51	+0.66	SF
3	7	Moa Wikberg	Sweden	44.17	+1.32	SF
4	2	Amy Green	Great Britain	44.44	+1.59	SF
5	3	Barbora Sovova	Czech Republic	45.52	+2.67	SF
6	6	Netta Malinen	Finland	45.97	+3.12	SF
7	8	Madara Aldina	Latvia	46.81	+3.96	qBT
8	1	Markela-Nina Kavoura	Greece	47.59	+4.74	

Heat 2

Rank	Lane	Athlete	Nation	Time	Gap	Notes
1	4	Julia Olszewska	Poland	42.48		SF
2	5	Anja Apollonio	Slovenia	43.64	+1.16	SF
3	3	Agata Fantini	Italy	44.38	+1.90	SF
4	6	Esti Olivier	South Africa	44.64	+2.16	SF
5	7	Kali Wilding	United States	46.80	+4.32	SF
6	1	Samalulu Fuatino Te Aho Clifton	Samoa	47.88	+5.40	SF
7	8	Sandra Scalia	Colombia	50.79	+8.31	qBT
8	2	Sabiha Ben Othmane	Tunisia	52.78	+10.30	

Heat 3

Rank	Lane	Athlete	Nation	Time	Gap	Notes
1	4	Frederikke Mørcke	Denmark	41.91		SF
2	6	Anna Lucz	Hungary	41.96	+0.05	SF
3	3	Anastasiia Dolgova	Neutral Athlete	42.79	+0.88	SF
4	5	Ivanna Dyachenko	Ukraine	43.54	+1.63	SF
5	8	Yui Taniguchi	Japan	45.50	+3.59	SF
6	1	Tatyana Gladkova	Kazakhstan	45.92	+4.01	SF
7	2	Aya Ferfad	Algeria	50.95	+9.04	
8	7	Samara Antony Chacko	India	54.88	+12.97	

Heat 4

Rank	Lane	Athlete	Nation	Time	Gap	Notes
1	5	Nan Wang	China	43.12		SF
2	3	Ella Beere	Australia	43.75	+0.63	SF
3	4	Toshka Besharah	Canada	43.87	+0.75	SF
4	6	Candelaria Sequeira	Argentina	45.87	+2.75	SF
5	2	Shakhrizoda Mavlonova	Uzbekistan	46.71	+3.59	SF
6	7	Karen Itzel Berrelleza Torres	Mexico	49.11	+5.99	SF
7	8	Li-Chin Tseng	Chinese Taipei	49.23	+6.11	qBT

=== Semi finals ===
The result of the semi finals were as follows:

Qualification rule: First three boats in each semifinal advance to A final; next three boats advance to B final; remainder eliminated

Semifinal 1

Rank	Lane	Name(s)	Nation	Time	Gap	Notes
1	5	Nan Wang	China	40.76		FA
2	6	Julia Olszewska	Poland	40.80	+0.04	FA
3	3	Anastasiia Dolgova	Neutral Athletes A	41.11	+0.35	FA
4	7	Ivanna Dyachenko	Ukraine	41.33	+0.57	FB
5	4	Katharina Diederichs	Germany	41.81	+1.05	FB
6	2	Shakhrizoda Mavlonova	Uzbekistan	44.18	+3.42	FB
7	8	Netta Malinen	Finland	44.24	+3.48	
8	1	Samalulu Fuatino Te Aho Clifton	Samoa	45.66	+4.90	
9	9	Madara Aldina	Latvia	46.23	+5.47	

Semifinal 2

Rank	Lane	Name(s)	Nation	Time	Gap	Notes
1	5	Frederikke Hauge Mørcke	Denmark	41.66		FA
2	4	Ella Beere	Australia	41.83	+0.17	FA
3	3	Agata Fantini	Italy	43.07	+1.41	FA
4	8	Barbora Sovova	Czech Republic	43.64	+1.98	FB
5	6	Moa Wikberg	Sweden	43.87	+2.21	FB
6	2	Candelaria Sequeira	Argentina	44.05	+2.39	FB
7	9	Tatyana Gladkova	Kazakhstan	44.66	+3.00	
8	7	Esti Olivier	South Africa	44.70	+3.04	
9	1	Li-Chin Tseng	Chinese Taipei	47.92	+6.26	

Semifinal 3

Rank	Lane	Name(s)	Nation	Time	Gap	Notes
1	4	Anna Lucz	Hungary	39.92		FA
2	6	Anja Apollonio	Slovenia	40.14	+0.22	FA
3	5	Sara Ouzande	Spain	40.38	+0.46	FA
4	3	Toshka Besharah	Canada	41.1	+1.18	FB
5	7	Amy Green	Great Britain	41.57	+1.65	FB
6	2	Kali Wilding	United States	42.97	+3.05	FB
7	8	Yui Taniguchi	Japan	43.41	+3.49	
8	1	Sandra Scalia	Colombia	47.46	+7.54	
9	9	Karen Itzel Berrelleza Torres	Mexico	48.08	+8.16	

=== Finals ===
The result of the final races were follows:

B final

Rank	Lane	Name(s)	Nation	Time	Gap	Notes
1	4	Toshka Besharah	Canada	41.53		
2	5	Ivanna Dyachenko	Ukraine	41.86	+0.33	
3	3	Moa Wikberg	Sweden	42.23	+0.70	
4	8	Amy Green	Great Britain	42.37	+0.84	
5	7	Katharina Diederichs	Germany	42.55	+1.02	
6	6	Barbora Sovova	Czech Republic	43.52	+1.99	
7	1	Candelaria Sequeira	Argentina	43.55	+2.02	
8	2	Shakhrizoda Mavlonova	Uzbekistan	44.67	+3.14	
9	9	Kali Wilding	United States	44.76	+3.23	

A final

Rank	Lane	Name(s)	Nation	Time	Gap	Notes
1st place, gold medalist(s)	4	Frederikke Mørcke	Denmark	39.71		
2nd place, silver medalist(s)	6	Anna Lucz	Hungary	40.31	+0.60	
3rd place, bronze medalist(s)	9	Sara Ouzande	Spain	40.71	+1.00	
4	5	Nan Wang	China	40.78	+1.07	
5	7	Ella Beere	Australia	41.00	+1.29	
6	3	Julia Olszewska	Poland	41.13	+1.42	
7=	2	Anja Apollonio	Slovenia	41.28	+1.57	
7=	8	Anastasiia Dolgova	Neutral Athletes A	41.28	+1.57	
9	1	Agata Fantini	Italy	42.36	+2.65	
