= Canoe sprint at the 2023 European Games – Women's K-4 500 metres =

Women's K-4 500 metres at the 2023 European Games
- Venue: Kryspinów Waterway
- Date: 21–22 June
- Competitors: 52 from 13 nations
- Teams: 13
- Winning time: 1:31.701

Medalists
gold medal	Adrianna Kąkol; Karolina Naja; Anna Puławska; Dominika Putto	Poland
silver medal	Jule Hake; Katinka Hofmann; Paulina Paszek; Lena Röhlings	Germany
bronze medal	Bolette Nyvang Iversen; Katrine Jensen; Frederikke Matthiesen; Sara Milthers	Denmark

The women's K-4 500 metres canoe sprint competition at the 2023 European Games took place on 21 and 22 June at the Kryspinów Waterway.

== Schedule ==
All times are local (UTC+2).

Date	Time	Round
Wednesday, 21 June 2023	9:08	Heats
Wednesday, 21 June 2023	15:38	Semifinal
Thursday, 22 June 2023	14:43	Final

== Results ==
=== Heats ===
==== Heat 1 ====
Rank	Kayakers	Country	Time	Notes
1	Karolina Naja; Anna Puławska; Adrianna Kąkol; Dominika Putto	Poland	1:32.768	QF
2	Paulina Paszek; Jule Hake; Katinka Hofmann; Lena Röhlings	Germany	1:33.529	QF
3	Maria Virik; Anna Sletsjøe; Hedda Øritsland; Kristine Amundsen	Norway	1:34.382	QF
4	Diana Tanko; Nataliia Dokiienko; Hanna Pavlova; Inna Hryschun	Ukraine	1:34.699	QS
5	Anežka Paloudová; Kateřina Zárubová; Barbora Betlachová; Adéla Házová	Czech Republic	1:34.959	QS
6	Katarína Pecsuková; Réka Bugár; Bianka Sidová; Mariana Petrušová	Slovakia	1:36.142	QS
7	Susanna Cicali; Francesca Genzo; Cristina Petracca; Agata Fantini	Italy	1:37.079	QS

==== Heat 2 ====
Rank	Kayakers	Country	Time	Notes
1	Sára Fojt; Noémi Pupp; Alida Dóra Gazsó; Tamara Csipes	Hungary	1:34.078	QF
2	Frederikke Matthiesen; Sara Milthers; Katrine Jensen; Bolette Nyvang Iversen	Denmark	1:34.578	QF
3	Deborah Kerr; Emma Russell; Emily Lewis; Rebeka Simon	Great Britain	1:35.804	QF
4	Lucía Val; Bárbara Pardo; Nerea García; Carla Corral	Spain	1:36.008	QS
5	Francisca Laia; Joana Vasconcelos; Teresa Portela; Maria Rei	Portugal	1:36.364	QS
6	Linnea Stensils; Moa Wikberg; Julia Lagerstam; Melina Andersson	Sweden	1:37.888	QS

=== Semifinal ===
Rank	Kayakers	Country	Time	Notes
1	Francisca Laia; Joana Vasconcelos; Teresa Portela; Maria Rei	Portugal	1:34.889	QF
2	Diana Tanko; Nataliia Dokiienko; Hanna Pavlova; Inna Hryschun	Ukraine	1:35.342	QF
3	Anežka Paloudová; Kateřina Zárubová; Barbora Betlachová; Adéla Házová	Czech Republic	1:35.702	QF
4	Lucía Val; Bárbara Pardo; Nerea García; Carla Corral	Spain	1:35.939	
5	Susanna Cicali; Francesca Genzo; Cristina Petracca; Agata Fantini	Italy	1:36.972	
6	Katarína Pecsuková; Réka Bugár; Bianka Sidová; Mariana Petrušová	Slovakia	1:37.022	
7	Linnea Stensils; Moa Wikberg; Julia Lagerstam; Melina Andersson	Sweden	1:38.733	

=== Final ===
Rank	Kayakers	Country	Time
1st place, gold medalist(s)	Karolina Naja; Anna Puławska; Adrianna Kąkol; Dominika Putto	Poland	1:31.701
2nd place, silver medalist(s)	Paulina Paszek; Jule Hake; Katinka Hofmann; Lena Röhlings	Germany	1:32.619
3rd place, bronze medalist(s)	Frederikke Matthiesen; Sara Milthers; Katrine Jensen; Bolette Nyvang Iversen	Denmark	1:33.656
4	Sára Fojt; Noémi Pupp; Alida Dóra Gazsó; Tamara Csipes	Hungary	1:33.699
5	Maria Virik; Anna Sletsjøe; Hedda Øritsland; Kristine Amundsen	Norway	1:34.561
6	Diana Tanko; Nataliia Dokiienko; Hanna Pavlova; Inna Hryschun	Ukraine	1:34.561
7	Francisca Laia; Joana Vasconcelos; Teresa Portela; Maria Rei	Portugal	1:34.651
8	Deborah Kerr; Emma Russell; Emily Lewis; Rebeka Simon	Great Britain	1:34.931
9	Anežka Paloudová; Kateřina Zárubová; Barbora Betlachová; Adéla Házová	Czech Republic	1:35.401
