= 2026 ICF Canoe Sprint World Championships – Women's K-1 500 metres =

Women's K-1 500 metres at the 2026 ICF Canoe Sprint World Championships
- Venue: Lake Malta
- Location: Poznań, Poland
- Dates: 26-30 August
- Competitors: 39 from 39 nations
- Winning time: 1:47.55

Medalists
gold medal	Pauline Jagsch	Germany
silver medal	Aimee Fisher	New Zealand
bronze medal	Anna Pulawska	Poland

The women's K-1 500 metres competition at the 2026 ICF Canoe Sprint World Championships in Poznań took place at Lake Malta.

== Schedule ==
The schedule is as follows:

Date	Time	Round
Thursday 27 August 2026		Heats
Saturday 29 August 2026		Semifinals
Sunday 30 August 2026		Final B
Sunday 30 August 2026		Final A

== Record ==
The best performance previously in this discipline was:

World Best	Time	Athlete	Nation	Venue
World Best	1:46.19	Aimee Fisher	New Zealand	Szeged (Hungary)

== Results ==
=== Heats ===
The result of the heats were follows:

Qualification rule: First five boats in each heat and two fastest other boats qualify for the semifinal; remainder eliminated

Heat 1

Rank	Lane	Name	Nation	Time	Gap	Notes
1	5	Pauline Jagsch	Germany	1:57.80		SF
2	4	Anja Apollonio	Slovenia	1:59.54	1.74	SF
3	3	Pernille Knudsen	Denmark	1:59.81	2.01	SF
4	6	Elena Wolgamot	United States	2:00.13	2.33	SF
5	2	Luxi Zhang	China	2:00.23	2.43	SF
6	7	Marija Dostanic	Serbia	2:02.90	5.10	QBT
7	8	Madara Aldina	Latvia	2:17.87	20.07	
8	1	Sandra Scalia	Colombia	2:20.04	22.24	

Heat 2

Rank	Lane	Name	Nation	Time	Gap	Notes
1	5	Aimee Fisher	New Zealand	1:59.78		SF
2	4	Hermien Peters	Belgium	2:00.52	0.74	SF
3	2	Lizaveta Vilkova	Neutral Athlete	2:04.12	4.34	SF
4	3	Agata Fantini	Italy	2:05.26	5.48	SF
5	6	Candelaria Sequeira	Argentina	2:07.33	7.55	SF
6	7	Saman Soltani	Austria	2:13.41	13.63	
7	1	Samalulu Fuatino Te Aho Clifton	Samoa	2:14.84	15.06	
8	8	Aya Ferfad	Algeria	2:24.62	24.84	

Heat 3

Rank	Lane	Name	Nation	Time	Gap	Notes
1	5	Anna Pulawska	Poland	2:00.30		SF
2	4	Michelle Russell	Canada	2:01.43	1.13	SF
3	3	Teresa Portela	Portugal	2:02.34	2.04	SF
4	7	Stella Sukhanova	Kazakhstan	2:05.29	4.99	SF
5	6	Netta Malinen	Finland	2:10.57	10.27	SF
6	1	Olivia Larsson	Sweden	2:10.89	10.59	
7	8	Sabiha Ben Othmane	Tunisia	2:28.94	28.64	
0	2	Stevani Maysche Ibo	Indonesia	DNS		

Heat 4

Rank	Lane	Name	Nation	Time	Gap	Notes
1	5	Natalia Drobot	Australia	1:58.18		SF
2	4	Beatriz Briones Fragoza	Mexico	2:02.87	4.69	SF
3	3	Elizaveta Fedorova	Estonia	2:04.40	6.22	SF
4	7	Arina Tanatmisheva	Uzbekistan	2:04.69	6.51	SF
5	6	Esti Olivier	South Africa	2:04.78	6.60	SF
6	2	Savvia Kyriaki Hadjicharalambous	Cyprus	2:05.61	7.43	QBT
7	1	Honami Tohda	Japan	2:17.09	18.91	
8	8	Li-Chin Tseng	Chinese Taipei	2:19.80	21.62	

Heat 5

Rank	Lane	Name	Nation	Time	Gap	Notes
1	5	Zsoka Csikos	Hungary	2:03.93	0.00	SF
2	7	Carolina Garcia Otero	Spain	2:05.52	1.59	SF
3	6	Barbora Betlachova	Czech Republic	2:06.16	2.23	SF
4	4	Franziska Widmer	Switzerland	2:07.18	3.25	SF
5	3	Lucy Lee-Smith	Great Britain	2:07.95	4.02	SF
6	2	Snizhana Stalinova	Ukraine	2:08.03	4.10	
7	8	Samara Antony Chacko	India	2:40.31	36.38	

=== Semi finals ===
The result of the semifinal races were follows: Qualification rule: First three boats in each semifinal qualify for the A final; next three to B final; remainder to C final

Semifinal 1

Rank	Lane	Name	Nation	Time	Gap	Notes
1	5	Pauline Jagsch	Germany	2:01.75		FA
2	4	Natalia Drobot	Australia	2:02.30	0.55	FA
3	6	Hermien Peters	Belgium	2:03.91	2.16	FA
4	7	Teresa Portela	Portugal	2:05.27	3.52	FB
5	8	Arina Tanatmisheva	Uzbekistan	2:07.13	5.38	FB
6	9	Lucy Lee-Smith	Great Britain	2:08.97	7.22	FB
7	3	Carolina Garcia Otero	Spain	2:09.28	7.53	FC
8	2	Elena Wolgamot	United States	2:09.44	7.69	FC
9	1	Candelaria Sequeira	Argentina	2:14.27	12.52	FC

Semifinal 2

Rank	Lane	Name	Nation	Time	Gap	Notes
1	5	Anna Pulawska	Poland	2:04.73		FA
2	8	Luxi Zhang	China	2:05.94	1.21	FA
3	6	Beatriz Briones Fragoza	Mexico	2:06.24	1.51	FA
4	9	Marija Dostanic	Serbia	2:07.72	2.99	FB
5	7	Barbora Betlachova	Czech Republic	2:07.76	3.03	FB
6	2	Stella Sukhanova	Kazakhstan	2:09.58	4.85	FB
7	3	Lizaveta Vilkova	Neutral Athlete B	2:11.92	7.19	FC
8	4	Anja Apollonio	Slovenia	2:15.24	10.51	FC
9	1	Esti Olivier	South Africa	2:16.25	11.52	FC

Semifinal 3

Rank	Lane	Name	Nation	Time	Gap	Notes
1	5	Aimee Fisher	New Zealand	2:03.79		FA
2	4	Zsoka Csikos	Hungary	2:04.01	0.22	FA
3	6	Michelle Russell	Canada	2:04.63	0.84	FA
4	8	Franziska Widmer	Switzerland	2:08.79	5.00	FB
5	7	Elizaveta Fedorova	Estonia	2:09.35	5.56	FB
6	3	Pernille Knudsen	Denmark	2:09.64	5.85	FB
7	2	Agata Fantini	Italy	2:11.32	7.53	FC
8	9	Savvia Kyriaki Hadjicharalambous	Cyprus	2:11.38	7.59	FC
9	1	Netta Malinen	Finland	2:21.71	17.92	FC

=== Finals ===
The result of the final races were follows:

C final

Rank	Lane	Name	Nation	Time	Gap	Notes
1	6	Carolina Garcia Otero	Spain	1:51.24		
2	2	Elena Wolgamot	United States	1:51.62	0.38	
3	4	Agata Fantini	Italy	1:54.77	3.53	
4	7	Savvia Kyriaki Hadjicharalambous	Cyprus	1:56.72	5.48	
5	9	Candelaria Sequeira	Argentina	1:56.75	5.51	
6	5	Lizaveta Vilkova	Neutral Athletes B	1:57.96	6.72	
7	8	Esti Olivier	South Africa	1:59.40	8.16	
8	1	Netta Malinen	Finland	2:01.26	10.02	
9	3	Anja Apollonio	Slovenia	2:03.02	11.78	

B final

Rank	Lane	Name	Nation	Time	Gap	Notes
1	2	Pernille Knudsen	Denmark	1:52.32		
2	7	Barbora Betlachova	Czech Republic	1:53.10	0.78	
3	5	Marija Dostanic	Serbia	1:53.70	1.38	
4	3	Elizaveta Fedorova	Estonia	1:53.94	1.62	
5	4	Teresa Portela	Portugal	1:54.28	1.96	
6	8	Arina Tanatmisheva	Uzbekistan	1:54.63	2.31	
7	1	Stella Sukhanova	Kazakhstan	1:55.12	2.80	
8	6	Franziska Widmer	Switzerland	1:55.89	3.57	
9	9	Lucy Lee-Smith	Great Britain	1:59.92	7.60	

A final

Rank	Lane	Name	Nation	Time	Gap	Notes
1st place, gold medalist(s)	6	Pauline Jagsch	Germany	1:47.55		
2nd place, silver medalist(s)	5	Aimee Fisher	New Zealand	1:48.02	0.47	
3rd place, bronze medalist(s)	4	Anna Pulawska	Poland	1:48.58	1.03	
3	2	Natalia Drobot	Australia	1:48.58	1.03	
5	7	Zsoka Csikos	Hungary	1:49.92	2.37	
6	8	Beatriz Briones Fragoza	Mexico	1:50.56	3.01	
7	9	Hermien Peters	Belgium	1:51.06	3.51	
8	1	Michelle Russell	Canada	1:51.69	4.14	
9	3	Luxi Zhang	China	1:52.86	5.31	
