= 2026 ICF Canoe Sprint World Championships – Men's K-1 200 metres =

Men's K-1 200 metres at the 2026 ICF Canoe Sprint World Championships
- Location: Poznań, Poland
- Dates: 26–29 August
- Competitors: 39
- Winning time: 34.15

Medalists
gold medal	Andrea Di Liberto	Italy
silver medal	Marko Dragosavljević	Serbia
bronze medal	Carlos Arévalo	Spain

The men's K-1 200 metres competition at the 2026 ICF Canoe Sprint World Championships in Poznań took place between 26 and 28 August 2026.

== Schedule ==
The schedule is as follows:

Date	Time	Round
Wednesday 26 August 2026	11:20	Heats
Thursday 27 August 2026	16:30	Semifinals
Friday 28 August 2026	13:55	Final C
Friday 28 August 2026	14:00	Final B
Friday 28 August 2026	16:00	Final A

== Results ==
=== Heats ===
Four heats were held on morning of 26 August 2026.

Qualification rule : First five in each heat (SF) plus two next fastest (qBT) qualify for semi-finals; remainder are eliminated.

==== Heat 1 ====
Rank	Canoeist	Country	Time	Notes
1	Marko Dragosavljević	Serbia	37.59	QS
2	Dmytro Danylenko	Ukraine	37.86	QS
3	Nicholas Matveev	Canada	38.64	QS
4	Rasmus Brandstrup Knudsen	Denmark	39.69	QS
5	Finn Connell	United States	41.52	QS
6	Fred Kahu	Estonia	41.84	qBT
7	Maxim Rogut	Moldova	41.89	
	Milan Gajdobranski	United Arab Emirates	DNS	

==== Heat 2 ====
Rank	Canoeist	Country	Time	Notes
1	Roberts Akmens	Latvia	38.13	QS
2	Gergely Balogh	Hungary	38.18	QS
3	Taishi Tanada	Japan	40.10	QS
4	Mauricio Figueroa	Mexico	40.12	QS
5	Vladimír Cerman	Czech Republic	40.54	QS
6	Mehdi Berkani	Algeria	42.88	
7	Bu Tunur Saud	Saudi Arabia	49.02	
8	Petar Jocović	Montenegro	54.07	

==== Heat 3 ====
Rank	Canoeist	Country	Time	Notes
1	Carlos Arévalo	Spain	38.32	QS
2	Wojciech Pilarz	Poland	38.59	QS
3	Matevž Manfreda	Slovenia	38.60	QS
4	Wang Jinwei	China	38.78	QS
5	Aliaksei Dashchynski	Neutral Athlete B	39.14	QS
6	Harshwardhan Singh Shaktawat	India	42.63	
7	Slehddine Maknine	Tunisia	44.00	
8	Diogo Araujo	Cape Verde	44.55	
9	Hamza Ahmed	Egypt	39.68	

==== Heat 4 ====
Rank	Canoeist	Country	Time	Notes
1	Andrea Di Liberto	Italy	37.24	QS
2	Csaba Zalka	Slovakia	38.31	QS
3	Badri Kavelashvili	Georgia	38.39	QS
4	Luke Egger	Australia	39.48	QS
5	Christos Matsas	Greece	39.70	QS
6	Hugo Lagerstam	Sweden	39.87	qBT
7	Kron Balidemaj	Kosovo	48.69	

==== Heat 5 ====
Rank	Canoeist	Country	Time	Notes
1	Artūras Seja	Lithuania	37.64	QS
2	Leon-Michael Reckzeh	Germany	37.97	QS
3	Lucas Røsten	Norway	38.75	QS
4	Mohamed Ismail	Egypt	41.32	QS
5	Ahmed Faris	Iraq	41.37	QS
6	Dairon Ardila	Colombia	43.04	
	Iago Bebiano	Portugal		

=== Semifinals ===
Three semi finals were held on morning of 27 August 2026.

Qualification rule : First three in each heat to A final (FA) next three in each heat to B final (FB); remainder to C final (FC).

==== Semifinal 1 ====
Rank	Canoeist	Country	Time	Notes
1	Marko Dragosavljević	Serbia	36.86	FA
2	Andrea Di Liberto	Italy	37.02	FA
3	Matevž Manfreda	Slovenia	37.74	FA
4	Leon-Michael Reckzeh	Germany	37.86	FB
5	Gergely Balogh	Hungary	35.76	FB
6	Luke Egger	Australia	38.65	FB
7	Rasmus Brandstrup Knudsen	Denmark	38.69	FC
8	Vladimír Cerman	Czech Republic	39.81	FC
9	Ahmed Faris	Iraq	40.45	FC

==== Semifinal 2 ====
Rank	Canoeist	Country	Time	Notes
1	Carlos Arévalo	Spain	37.31	FA
2	Csaba Zalka	Slovakia	37.50	FA
3	Dmytro Danylenko	Ukraine	37.56	FA
4	Lucas Røsten	Norway	37.87	FB
5	Wang Jinwei	China	38.00	FB
6	Hugo Lagerstam	Sweden	38.60	FB
7	Taishi Tanada	Japan	39.64	FC
8	Christos Matsas	Greece	39.83	FC
9	Finn Connell	United States	40.91	FC

==== Semifinal 3 ====
Rank	Canoeist	Country	Time	Notes
1	Badri Kavelashvili	Georgia	36.64	FA
2	Artūras Seja	Lithuania	36.64	FA
3	Wojciech Pilarz	Poland	37.08	FA
4	Roberts Akmens	Latvia	37.26	FB
5	Nicholas Matveev	Canada	37.54	FB
6	Aliaksei Dashchynski	Neutral Athlete B	37.57	FB
7	Mauricio Figueroa	Mexico	38.92	FC
8	Fred Kahu	Estonia	40.77	FC
9	Mohamed Ismail	Egypt	40.98	FC

=== Finals ===
The finals were held on the afternoon of 29 August.

==== Final C ====
Rank	Canoeist	Country	Time	Notes
1	Rasmus Brandstrup Knudsen	Denmark	36.20	
2	Christos Matsas	Greece	36.36	
3	Taishi Tanada	Japan	36.39	
4	Mauricio Figueroa	Mexico	36.44	
5	Vladimír Cerman	Czech Republic	37.09	
6	Mohamed Ismail	Egypt	37.75	
7	Ahmed Faris	Iraq	38.36	
8	Finn Connell	United States	38.76	
9	Fred Kahu	Estonia	39.05	

==== Final B ====
Rank	Canoeist	Country	Time	Notes
1	Nicholas Matveev	Canada	34.94	
2	Leon-Michael Reckzeh	Germany	35.04	
3	Wang Jinwei	China	35.18	
4	Roberts Akmens	Latvia	35.24	
5	Lucas Røsten	Norway	35.46	
6	Luke Egger	Australia	35.76	
7	Aliaksei Dashchynski	Neutral Athlete B	35.85	
8	Gergely Balogh	Hungary	35.90	
9	Hugo Lagerstam	Sweden	36.63	

==== Final A ====
Rank	Canoeist	Country	Time	Notes
1st place, gold medalist(s)	Andrea Di Liberto	Italy	34.15	
2nd place, silver medalist(s)	Marko Dragosavljević	Serbia	34.72	
3rd place, bronze medalist(s)	Carlos Arévalo	Spain	34.98	
4	Artūras Seja	Lithuania	35.00	
5	Dmytro Danylenko	Ukraine	35.22	
6	Wojciech Pilarz	Poland	35.25	
7	Csaba Zalka	Slovakia	35.48	
8	Badri Kavelashvili	Georgia	35.51	
9	Matevž Manfreda	Slovenia	36.04	
