= 2025 ICF Canoe Sprint World Championships – Men's K-1 200 metres =

Men's K-1 200 metres at the 2025 ICF Canoe Sprint World Championships
- Venue: Idroscalo Regatta Course
- Location: Milan, Italy
- Dates: 20–22 August
- Competitors: 36
- Winning time: 34.29

Medalists
gold medal	Kolos Csizmadia	Hungary
silver medal	Andrea Di Liberto	Italy
bronze medal	Badri Kavelashvili	Georgia

The men's K-1 200 metres competition at the 2025 ICF Canoe Sprint World Championships in Milan took place in Idroscalo Regatta Course.

== Schedule ==
The schedule is as follows:

Date	Time	Round
Wednesday 20 August 2025	11:31	Heats
Thursday 21 August 2025	15:00	Semifinals
Friday 22 August 2025	14:05	Final B
Friday 22 August 2025	15:46	Final A

== Results ==
=== Heats ===
The fastest six fastest boats (QS) in each heat plus the fastest three remaining boats (qs), advanced to the semi-finals.

==== Heat 1 ====
Rank	Canoeist	Country	Time	Notes
1	Artūras Seja	Lithuania	35.00	QS
2	Iago Bebiano	Portugal	35.28	QS
3	Gunnar Nydal Eeide	Norway	35.36	QS
4	Roberts Akmens	Latvia	35.60	QS
5	Nikita Maksimov	Individual Neutral Athletes	35.76	QS
6	Lin Yung-chieh	Chinese Taipei	37.48	QS
7	Brandon Ooi	Singapore	37.76	
8	Mateo Pérez	Colombia	38.99	
9	Sanjesh Singh Laishom	India	40.05	

==== Heat 2 ====
Rank	Canoeist	Country	Time	Notes
1	Kolos Csizmadia	Hungary	35.13	QS
2	Nicholas Matveev	Canada	35.54	QS
3	Moritz Florstedt	Germany	36.00	QS
4	Erlan Sultangaziev	Kyrgyzstan	36.25	QS
5	Yuito Sakai	Japan	36.45	QS
6	Jakub Brabec	Czech Republic	36.48	QS
7	Luis Melo Duarte	Uruguay	37.26	qS
8	Praison Buasamrong	Thailand	38.50	
9	Sergio Velásquez	Bolivia	44.94	

==== Heat 3 ====
Rank	Canoeist	Country	Time	Notes
1	Andrea Di Liberto	Italy	34.82	QS
2	Teodor Asenov	Bulgaria	35.29	QS
3	Badri Kavelashvili	Georgia	35.35	QS
4	Csaba Zalka	Slovakia	35.48	QS
5	Pierre van der Westhuyzen	Australia	35.49	QS
6	Henry van der Walt	South Africa	36.72	QS
7	Dmitriy Kholmogorov	Kazakhstan	37.13	qS
8	Joona Mäntynen	Finland	37.51	
9	Hamza Ahmed	Egypt	39.68	

==== Heat 4 ====
Rank	Canoeist	Country	Time	Notes
1	Strahinja Dragosavljević	Serbia	35.36	QS
2	Anže Pikon	Slovenia	35.68	QS
3	Valerii Harap	Ukraine	36.02	QS
4	Dzmitry Tratsiakou	Individual Neutral Athletes	36.05	QS
5	Erik Andersson	Sweden	36.80	QS
6	Choi Min-kyu	South Korea	36.81	QS
7	Subhi Subhi	Indonesia	37.45	qS
8	Iliya Nadernejad	ICF	38.47	
9	Fernandes Ngunza	Angola	40.98	

=== Semifinals ===
The fastest three boats in each semi advanced to the A final. The next three fastest boats in each semi advanced to the final B.

==== Semifinal 1 ====
Rank	Canoeist	Country	Time	Notes
1	Strahinja Dragosavljević	Serbia	35.07	FA
2	Kolos Csizmadia	Hungary	35.07	FA
3	Badri Kavelashvili	Georgia	35.43	FA
4	Iago Bebiano	Portugal	35.54	FB
5	Csaba Zalka	Slovakia	35.76	FB
6	Erik Andersson	Sweden	36.67	FB
7	Jakub Brabec	Czech Republic	36.71	
8	Dmitriy Kholmogorov	Kazakhstan	37.69	
9	Lin Yung-chieh	Chinese Taipei	38.41	

==== Semifinal 2 ====
Rank	Canoeist	Country	Time	Notes
1	Andrea Di Liberto	Italy	35.42	FA
2	Gunnar Nydal Eeide	Norway	35.96	FA
3	Anže Pikon	Slovenia	35.98	FA
4	Moritz Florstedt	Germany	36.26	FB
5	Dzmitry Tratsiakou	Individual Neutral Athletes	36.37	FB
6	Nikita Maksimov	Individual Neutral Athletes	36.71	FB
7	Luis Melo Duarte	Uruguay	37.21	
8	Erlan Sultangaziev	Kyrgyzstan	37.46	
9	Henry van der Walt	South Africa	37.89	

==== Semifinal 3 ====
Rank	Canoeist	Country	Time	Notes
1	Artūras Seja	Lithuania	35.49	FA
2	Nicholas Matveev	Canada	35.89	FA
3	Roberts Akmens	Latvia	36.05	FA
4	Pierre van der Westhuyzen	Australia	36.19	FB
5	Teodor Asenov	Bulgaria	36.50	FB
6	Valerii Harap	Ukraine	36.59	FB
7	Yuito Sakai	Japan	37.12	
8	Subhi Subhi	Indonesia	38.20	
9	Choi Min-kyu	South Korea	41.45	

=== Finals ===
==== Final B ====
Competitors in this final raced for positions 10 to 18.

Rank	Canoeist	Country	Time	Notes
1	Iago Bebiano	Portugal	35.68	
2	Csaba Zalka	Slovakia	35.82	
3	Valerii Harap	Ukraine	35.96	
4	Pierre van der Westhuyzen	Australia	36.25	
5	Teodor Asenov	Bulgaria	36.31	
5	Nikita Maksimov	Individual Neutral Athletes	36.31	
7	Dzmitry Tratsiakou	Individual Neutral Athletes	36.63	
8	Moritz Florstedt	Germany	36.83	
9	Erik Andersson	Sweden	37.08	

==== Final A ====
Competitors raced for positions 1 to 9, with medals going to the top three.

Rank	Canoeist	Country	Time	Notes
1st place, gold medalist(s)	Kolos Csizmadia	Hungary	34.29	
2nd place, silver medalist(s)	Andrea Di Liberto	Italy	34.54	
3rd place, bronze medalist(s)	Badri Kavelashvili	Georgia	34.64	
4	Strahinja Dragosavljević	Serbia	34.74	
5	Artūras Seja	Lithuania	34.83	
6	Nicholas Matveev	Canada	35.25	
7	Gunnar Nydal Eeide	Norway	35.26	
7	Anže Pikon	Slovenia	35.26	
9	Roberts Akmens	Latvia	35.28	
