= Martyna Klatt =

Polish sprint canoeist

Personal information
- Born: 4 February 1999 (age 27) Poznań, Poland

Sport
- Country: Poland
- Club: AZS–AWF Poznań
Medal record
Women's canoe sprint
Representing Poland
World Championships
| Gold medal – first place | 2023 Duisburg | K-2 200 m |
| Gold medal – first place | 2025 Milan | K-2 500 m |
| Silver medal – second place | 2023 Duisburg | K-2 500 m |
European Championships
| Gold medal – first place | 2025 Račice | K-2 500 m |
| Silver medal – second place | 2026 Montemor-o-Velho | K-2 500 m |
| Bronze medal – third place | 2021 Poznań | K-2 1000 m |

Martyna Klatt (born 4 February 1999) is a Polish sprint canoeist and world champion.

== Biography ==
She represented the club Energetyk Poznań and later became a member of AZS–AWF Poznań.

In 2017, she won a silver medal at the Junior European Championships in the K-4 500 meters event (with Sandra Ostrowska, Helena Wiśniewska, and Julia Olszewska). In 2018, she won a silver medal at the U-23 World Championships (with Dominika Włodarczyk, Klaudia Cyrulewska, and Małgorzata Puławska). In 2019, she won gold medals at both the U-23 World Championships and U-23 European Championships in the same event (with Klaudia Cyrulewska, Małgorzata Puławska, and Julia Olszewska). In 2021 and 2022, she won gold medals at the U-23 European Championships in the K-2 500 meters event (both times with Sandra Ostrowska) and K-4 500 meters event (in 2021 with Julia Olszewska, Klaudia Cyrulewska, and Sandra Ostrowska, and in 2022 with Sandra Ostrowska, Helena Wiśniewska, and Julia Krajewska). In 2022, she also won gold medals at the U-23 World Championships in the K-2 500 meters mix event (with Jakub Stepun), K-2 500 meters event (with Sandra Ostrowska), and K-4 500 meters event (with Sandra Ostrowska, Helena Wiśniewska, and Julia Olszewska).

At the 2021 European Championships, she won a bronze medal in the K-2 1000 meters event (with Sandra Ostrowska). At the 2023 World Championships, she won a gold medal in the K-2 200 meters event and a silver medal in the K-2 500 meters event (both times with Helena Wiśniewska).

At the Polish Senior Championships, she won six gold medals:

- K-1 1000 meters: 2022
- K-2 500 meters: 2020
- K-2 200 meters (mix): 2020, 2021, 2022, 2023

In the 2023 Przegląd Sportowy Plebiscite for the best athlete of the year, she, along with Helena Wiśniewska, took 8th place.
