= 2022 ICF Canoe Sprint World Championships – Men's K-1 200 metres =

Men's K-1 200 metres at the 2022 ICF Canoe Sprint World Championships
- Venue: Lake Banook
- Location: Dartmouth, Canada
- Dates: 4–7 August
- Competitors: 22 from 22 nations
- Winning time: 36.43

Medalists
gold medal	Carlos Arévalo	Spain
silver medal	Petter Menning	Sweden
bronze medal	Kolos Csizmadia	Hungary

The men's K-1 200 metres competition at the 2022 ICF Canoe Sprint World Championships in Dartmouth took place on Lake Banook.

== Schedule ==
The schedule is as follows:

Date	Time	Round
Thursday 4 August 2022	09:30	Heats
Friday 5 August 2022	14:50	Semifinals
Sunday 7 August 2022	10:10	Final B
Sunday 7 August 2022	11:19	Final A

== Results ==
=== Heats ===
The fastest boat in each heat advanced to the A final.
The next six fastest boats in each heat advanced to the semifinals.

==== Heat 1 ====
Rank	Canoeist	Country	Time	Notes
1	Petter Menning	Sweden	35.97	QA
2	Jonas Dräger	Germany	36.57	QS
3	Giacomo Cinti	Italy	36.68	QS
4	Vid Debeljak	Slovenia	37.68	QS
5	Ashton Reiser	New Zealand	38.10	QS
6	Wen Weng	Chinese Taipei	39.61	QS
7	Eddy Barranco	Puerto Rico	41.16	QS

==== Heat 2 ====
Rank	Canoeist	Country	Time	Notes
1	Kolos Csizmadia	Hungary	35.80	QA
2	Kevin Santos	Portugal	36.24	QS
3	Stav Mizrahi	Israel	36.85	QS
4	Augustus Cook	United States	38.70	QS
5	Lachlan Armstrong	Australia	38.84	QS
6	Nicolas Robinson	Trinidad and Tobago	40.22	QS
7	Saphan Swaleh	Pakistan	49.38	QS

==== Heat 3 ====
Rank	Canoeist	Country	Time	Notes
1	Carlos Arévalo	Spain	36.00	QA
2	Nicholas Matveev	Canada	36.59	QS
3	Roberts Akmens	Latvia	36.70	QS
4	Badri Kavelashvili	Georgia	36.75	QS
5	Brandon Ooi	Singapore	38.08	QS
6	Martin Sobisek	Czech Republic	38.22	QS
7	Amado Cruz	Belize	40.84	QS
	Ahmed Elbedwihy	Egypt	DNS	

=== Semifinals ===
The fastest three boats in each semi advanced to the A final.
The next four fastest boats in each semi, plus the fastest remaining boat advanced to the B final.

==== Semifinal 1 ====
Rank	Canoeist	Country	Time	Notes
1	Roberts Akmens	Latvia	37.06	QA
2	Jonas Dräger	Germany	37.44	QA
3	Badri Kavelashvili	Georgia	37.70	QA
4	Stav Mizrahi	Israel	37.84	QB
5	Martin Sobisek	Czech Republic	37.89	QB
6	Vid Debeljak	Slovenia	38.14	QB
7	Lachlan Armstrong	Australia	40.31	QB
8	Wen Weng	Chinese Taipei	41.04	qB
9	Saphan Swaleh	Pakistan	52.44	

==== Semifinal 2 ====
Rank	Canoeist	Country	Time	Notes
1	Nicholas Matveev	Canada	37.15	QA
2	Kevin Santos	Portugal	37.49	QA
3	Giacomo Cinti	Italy	37.75	QA
4	Ashton Reiser	New Zealand	38.74	QB
5	Brandon Ooi	Singapore	39.00	QB
6	Augustus Cook	United States	40.81	QB
7	Amado Cruz	Belize	40.95	QB
8	Nicolas Robinson	Trinidad and Tobago	41.64	
9	Eddy Barranco	Puerto Rico	42.14	

=== Finals ===
==== Final B ====
Competitors in this final raced for positions 10 to 18.

Rank	Canoeist	Country	Time
1	Stav Mizrahi	Israel	37.56
2	Martin Sobisek	Czech Republic	37.75
3	Vid Debeljak	Slovenia	37.75
4	Ashton Reiser	New Zealand	37.99
5	Brandon Ooi	Singapore	38.88
6	Augustus Cook	United States	39.37
7	Lachaln Armstrong	Australia	39.54
8	Wen Weng	Chinese Taipei	40.13
9	Amado Cruz	Belize	40.63

==== Final A ====
Competitors in this final raced for positions 1 to 9, with medals going to the top three.

Rank	Canoeist	Country	Time
1st place, gold medalist(s)	Carlos Arévalo	Spain	36.43
2nd place, silver medalist(s)	Petter Menning	Sweden	36.71
3rd place, bronze medalist(s)	Kolos Csizmadia	Hungary	36.82
4	Roberts Akmens	Latvia	36.94
5	Nicholas Matveev	Canada	37.43
6	Kevin Santos	Portugal	37.62
7	Giacomo Cinti	Italy	37.71
8	Jonas Dräger	Germany	37.94
9	Badri Kavelashvili	Georgia	38.54
