= Tuva'a Clifton =

Samoan canoeist (born 1997)

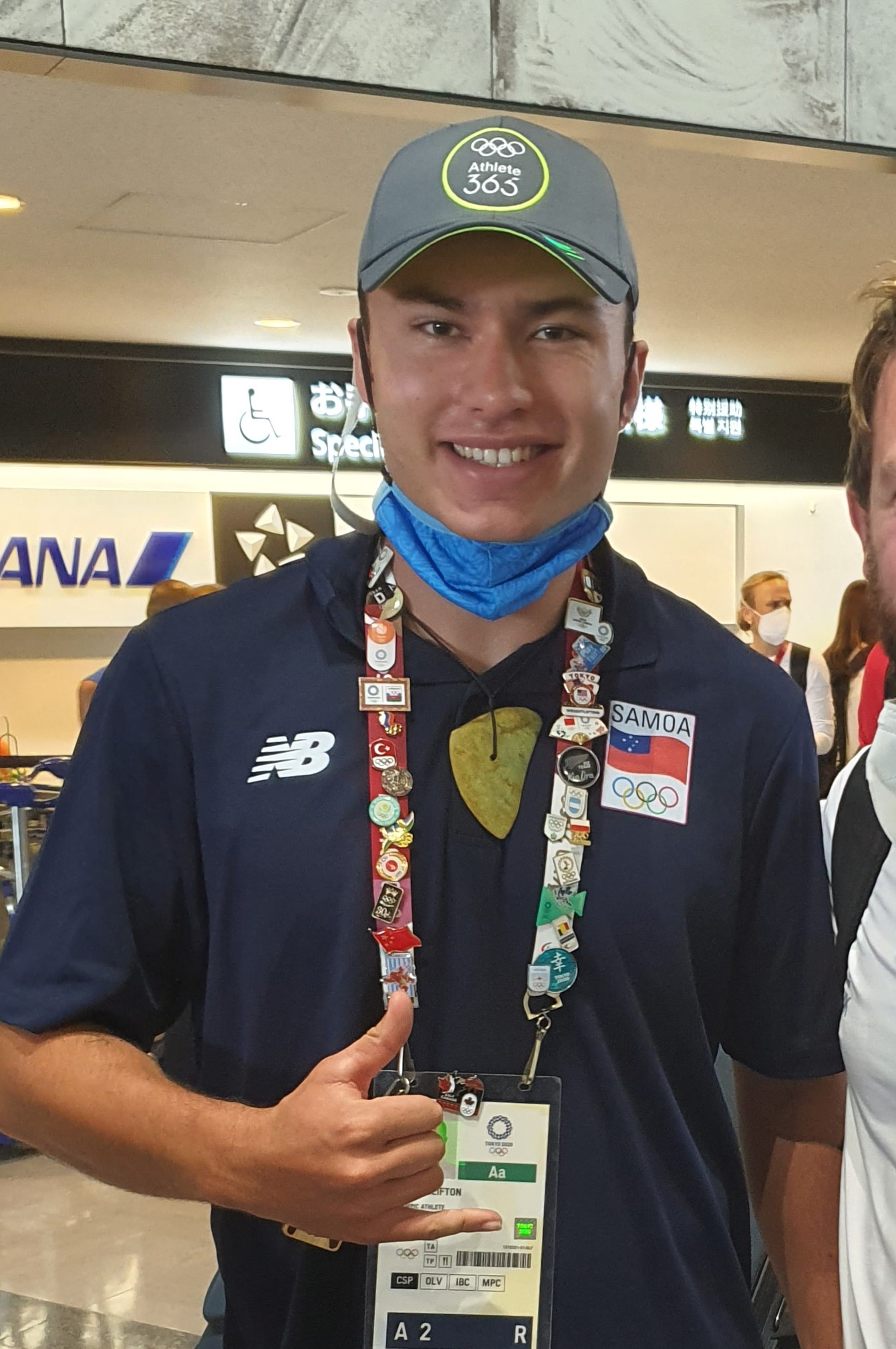
- Clifton in 2021

Personal information
- Other names: Tuva'a Mako Hugo Clifton
- Nationality: New Zealand, Samoa
- Born: 29 June 1997 (age 29) Auckland, New Zealand
- Relative: Samalulu Fuatino Te Aho Clifton (sister)

Sport
- Country: Samoa
- Sport: Canoe sprint

Tuva'a Clifton (born 29 June 1997) is a canoeist. Born in New Zealand, he represents Samoa internationally. He competed in the men's K-1 1000 metres event, K-1 200 metres event and K-2 1000 metres event at the 2020 Summer Olympics. He made the team via the quota place for Samoa after achieving a time within the limit in a qualification heat.

Clifton's family comes from New Zealand, Samoa and the Falkland Islands, with him spending his early life in New Zealand. Before becoming a kayaker, Clifton was a lifesaver at Muriwai Beach in New Zealand. Clifton has two sisters. One of them, Samalulu Fuatino Te Aho Clifton, is also an Olympic canoeist. Clifton and his sister both competed in canoe sprints at the 2024 Summer Olympics.

== Radio Host at 95bfm ==
As well as canoeing, Clifton is currently a radio host at the Auckland alternative radio station 95bFM. He runs a weekly show every Wednesday 10am-12pm.
