= Kolos Csizmadia =

Hungarian canoeist (born 1995)

Personal information
- Full name: Kolos Attila Csizmadia
- Born: 1 September 1995 (age 31) Budapest, Hungary
- Height: 1.86 m (6 ft 1 in)

Sport
- Country: Hungary
- Sport: Sprint kayak
Medal record
Men's sprint kayak
Representing Hungary
World Championships
Gold medal – first place	2021 Copenhagen	K-2 Mix 200 m
Gold medal – first place	2025 Milan	K-1 200 m
Silver medal – second place	2023 Duisburg	K-4 500 m
Bronze medal – third place	2022 Dartmouth	K-1 200 m

Kolos Attila Csizmadia (born 1 September 1995) is a Hungarian sprint canoeist. He competed in the men's K-1 200 metres event and the men's K-4 500 metres event at the 2020 Summer Olympics. He set an Olympic record in the heat of the K-1 200 metres event, qualifying directly to the semifinals with a time of 34.442 seconds. He ultimately qualified for the "A" final, and finished in 4th place overall.
