= Pauline Jagsch =

German canoeist (born 2003)

Personal information
- Nationality: German
- Born: 13 March 2003 (age 23) Berlin, Germany

Sport
- Sport: Sprint kayak
Medal record
Women's canoe sprint
Representing Germany
Olympic Games
Silver medal – second place	2024 Paris	K-4 500 m
World Championships
Gold medal – first place	2026 Poznań	K-1 500 m
Bronze medal – third place	2025 Milan	K-2 500 m
Bronze medal – third place	2026 Poznań	K-2 500 m
Bronze medal – third place	2026 Poznań	K-4 500 m
European Championships
Gold medal – first place	2026 Montemor-o-Velho	K-1 500 m
Gold medal – first place	2026 Montemor-o-Velho	K-2 500 m
Silver medal – second place	2025 Racice	K-2 500 m
Bronze medal – third place	2025 Racice	K-4 500 m

Pauline Jagsch (born 13 March 2003) is a German canoeist.

== Career ==
She competed in the women's K-4 500 metres at the 2024 Summer Olympics, where she won a silver medal with the German team.

== Competitive history ==
Overview of competitions with Pauline Jagsch
Year	Event	K-1 500 metres	K-2 500 metres	K-4 500 metres
2021	European Championships 2021	2nd place, silver medalist(s)	3rd place, bronze medalist(s)	
2021	World Championships 2021	2nd place, silver medalist(s)	2nd place, silver medalist(s)	
2022	World Championships 2022			7
2023	European Games 2023	8		
2023	World Championships 2023	7		
2024	Olympic Games 2024			2nd place, silver medalist(s)
