= 2024 ICF Canoe Sprint World Championships – Women's K-1 200 metres =

Women's K-1 200 metres at the 2024 ICF Canoe Sprint World Championships
- Venue: Rowing and Canoeing Race Course in Samarkand
- Location: Samarkand, Uzbekistan
- Dates: 24–25 August
- Competitors: 18 from 18 nations
- Winning time: 41.414

Medalists
gold medal	Liudmyla Kuklinovska	Ukraine
silver medal	Anastasiia Dolgova	Authorised Neutral Athletes
bronze medal	Bolette Nyvang Iversen	Denmark
bronze medal	Janka Rugonfalvi-Kiss	Hungary

The women's K-1 200 metres competition at the 2024 ICF Canoe Sprint World Championships in Samarkand took place in Rowing and Canoeing Race Course in Samarkand.

== Schedule ==
The schedule is as follows:

Date	Time	Round
Saturday 24 August 2024	9:00	Heats
Saturday 24 August 2024	16:00	Semifinals
Sunday 25 August 2024	14:04	Final

== Results ==
=== Heats ===
The fastest three boats in each heat advanced directly to the final.
The next four fastest boats in each heat, plus the fastest remaining boat advanced to the semifinal

==== Heat 1 ====
Rank	Canoeist	Country	Time	Notes
1	Alina Svita	Individual Neutral Athletes	41.715	QF
2	Špela Ponomarenko Janić	Slovenia	41.725	QF
3	Anamaria Govorčinović	Croatia	41.962	QF
4	Liudmyla Kuklinovska	Ukraine	42.270	QS
5	Juri Urada	Japan	43.249	QS
6	Stella Sukhanova	Kazakhstan	43.340	QS
7	Réka Bugár	Slovakia	43.548	QS
8	Pauline Freslon	France	45.450	
9	Lee Ha-lin	South Korea	45.499	

==== Heat 2 ====
Rank	Canoeist	Country	Time	Notes
1	Bolette Nyvang Iversen	Denmark	41.116	QF
2	Anastasiia Dolgova	Individual Neutral Athletes	41.174	QF
3	Julia Lagerstam	Sweden	41.665	QF
4	Janka Rugonfalvi-Kiss	Hungary	41.847	QS
5	Teresa Tirado	Spain	41.994	QS
6	Kristine Strand Amundsen	Norway	42.617	QS
7	Katarzyna Kołodziejczyk	Poland	43.539	QS
8	Ekaterina Shubina	Uzbekistan	44.239	qS
9	Saman Soltani	ICF	44.770	

=== Semifinal ===
The fastest three boats advanced to the A final.

Rank	Canoeist	Country	Time	Notes
1	Janka Rugonfalvi-Kiss	Hungary	41.618	QF
2	Liudmyla Kuklinovska	Ukraine	42.110	QF
3	Teresa Tirado	Spain	42.407	QF
4	Réka Bugár	Slovakia	42.733	
5	Juri Urada	Japan	42.852	
6	Katarzyna Kołodziejczyk	Poland	43.170	
7	Kristine Strand Amundsen	Norway	43.791	
8	Stella Sukhanova	Kazakhstan	44.036	
9	Ekaterina Shubina	Uzbekistan	44.767	

=== Final ===
Competitors raced for positions 1 to 9, with medals going to the top three.

Rank	Canoeist	Country	Time
1st place, gold medalist(s)	Liudmyla Kuklinovska	Ukraine	41.414
2nd place, silver medalist(s)	Anastasiia Dolgova	Individual Neutral Athletes	42.183
3rd place, bronze medalist(s)	Bolette Nyvang Iversen	Denmark	42.761
3rd place, bronze medalist(s)	Janka Rugonfalvi-Kiss	Hungary	42.761
5	Alina Svita	Individual Neutral Athletes	42.839
6	Julia Lagerstam	Sweden	43.064
7	Anamaria Govorčinović	Croatia	43.574
8	Špela Ponomarenko Janić	Slovenia	43.678
9	Teresa Tirado	Spain	43.700
