= 2022 ICF Canoe Sprint World Championships – Women's K-1 500 metres =

Women's K-1 500 metres at the 2022 ICF Canoe Sprint World Championships
- Venue: Lake Banook
- Location: Dartmouth, Canada
- Dates: 3–6 August
- Competitors: 28 from 28 nations
- Winning time: 1:58.69

Medalists
gold medal	Lisa Carrington	New Zealand
silver medal	Anamaria Govorčinović	Croatia
bronze medal	Jule Hake	Germany

The women's K-1 500 metres competition at the 2022 ICF Canoe Sprint World Championships in Dartmouth took place on Lake Banook.

== Schedule ==
The schedule is as follows:

Date	Time	Round
Wednesday 3 August 2022	15:30	Heats
Friday 5 August 2022	12:15	Semifinals
Saturday 6 August 2022	12:21	Final A
Saturday 6 August 2022	14:54	Final B

== Results ==
=== Heats ===
The fastest six boats in each heat, plus the three fastest seventh-place boats advanced to the semifinals.

==== Heat 1 ====
Rank	Canoeist	Country	Time	Notes
1	Eszter Rendessy	Hungary	1:54.66	QS
2	Hermien Peters	Belgium	1:54.71	QS
3	Yin Mengdie	China	1:55.72	QS
4	Teresa Portela	Portugal	1:57.54	QS
5	Esti Olivier	South Africa	1:57.82	QS
6	Beatriz Briones	Mexico	1:57.84	QS
7	Chen Jiexian	Singapore	1:59.35	qS

==== Heat 2 ====
Rank	Canoeist	Country	Time	Notes
1	Lisa Carrington	New Zealand	1:55.75	QS
2	Anežka Paloudová	Czech Republic	1:57.09	QS
3	Emily Lewis	Great Britain	1:59.15	QS
4	Emma Jorgensen	Denmark	1:59.58	QS
5	Netta Malinen	Finland	2:00.22	QS
6	Ruth Vorsselman	Netherlands	2:01.51	QS
7	Rebecca Georgsdotter	Sweden	2:01.79	qS
8	Juri Urada	Japan	2:01.88	

==== Heat 3 ====
Rank	Canoeist	Country	Time	Notes
1	Alyssa Bull	Australia	1:52.88	QS
2	Jule Hake	Germany	1:53.80	QS
3	Isabel Contreras	Spain	1:54.74	QS
4	Brenda Rojas	Argentina	1:58.89	QS
5	Irene Burgo	Italy	1:59.94	QS
6	Samaa Ahmed	Egypt	2:18.40	QS
	Tatiana Muñoz	Colombia	DNS	

==== Heat 4 ====
Rank	Canoeist	Country	Time	Notes
1	Anja Osterman	Slovenia	1:54.91	QS
2	Michelle Russell	Canada	1:56.19	QS
3	Anamaria Govorčinović	Croatia	1:56.60	QS
4	Dominika Putto	Poland	1:56.91	QS
5	Manon Hostens	France	1:57.19	QS
6	Kali Wilding	United States	2:10.68	QS

=== Semifinals ===
Qualification in each semi was as follows:

The fastest three boats advanced to the A final.
The next three fastest boats advanced to the B final.

==== Semifinal 1 ====
Rank	Canoeist	Country	Time	Notes
1	Lisa Carrington	New Zealand	1:55.84	QA
2	Hermien Peters	Belgium	1:57.18	QA
3	Anja Osterman	Slovenia	1:58.10	QA
4	Isabel Contreras	Spain	1:59.48	QB
5	Brenda Rojas	Argentina	1:59.95	QB
6	Beatriz Briones	Mexico	2:00.40	QB
7	Chen Jiexian	Singapore	2:00.99	
8	Manon Hostens	France	2:01.30	
9	Ruth Vorsselman	Netherlands	2:08.01	

==== Semifinal 2 ====
Rank	Canoeist	Country	Time	Notes
1	Alyssa Bull	Australia	1:57.39	QA
2	Emma Jorgensen	Denmark	1:58.37	QA
3	Yin Mengdie	China	1:58.77	QA
4	Dominika Putto	Poland	1:59.29	QB
5	Michelle Russell	Canada	2:00.77	QB
6	Esti Olivier	South Africa	2:00.98	QB
7	Emily Lewis	Great Britain	2:02.21	
8	Rebecca Georgsdotter	Sweden	2:07.38	
9	Samaa Ahmed	Egypt	2:21.14	

==== Semifinal 3 ====
Rank	Canoeist	Country	Time	Notes
1	Jule Hake	Germany	1:56.88	QA
2	Eszter Rendessy	Hungary	1:57.43	QA
3	Anamaria Govorčinović	Croatia	1:57.82	QA
4	Teresa Portela	Portugal	1:58.73	QB
5	Anežka Paloudová	Czech Republic	2:00.36	QB
6	Netta Malinen	Finland	2:04.27	QB
7	Irene Burgs	Italy	2:05.59	
8	Kali Wilding	United States	2:15.39	

=== Finals ===
==== Final B ====
Competitors in this final raced for positions 10 to 18.

Rank	Canoeist	Country	Time
1	Teresa Portela	Portugal	2:02.81
2	Isabel Contreras	Spain	2:03.31
3	Dominika Putto	Poland	2:03.62
4	Anežka Paloudová	Czech Republic	2:04.32
5	Michelle Russell	Canada	2:05.22
6	Esti Olivier	South Africa	2:07.16
7	Brenda Rojas	Argentina	2:07.80
8	Netta Malinen	Finland	2:08.77
9	Beatriz Briones	Mexico	2:09.30

==== Final A ====
Competitors in this final raced for positions 1 to 9, with medals going to the top three.

Rank	Canoeist	Country	Time
1st place, gold medalist(s)	Lisa Carrington	New Zealand	1:58.69
2nd place, silver medalist(s)	Anamaria Govorčinović	Croatia	1:59.97
3rd place, bronze medalist(s)	Jule Hake	Germany	2:00.30
4	Hermien Peters	Belgium	2:00.51
5	Alyssa Bull	Australia	2:00.62
6	Anja Osterman	Slovenia	2:00.86
7	Eszter Rendessy	Hungary	2:01.06
8	Emma Jorgensen	Denmark	2:01.91
9	Yin Mengdie	China	2:03.48
