= 2022 ICF Canoe Sprint World Championships – Women's K-2 200 metres =

Women's K-2 200 metres at the 2022 ICF Canoe Sprint World Championships
- Venue: Lake Banook
- Location: Dartmouth, Canada
- Dates: 3–6 August
- Competitors: 22 from 11 nations
- Winning time: 38.76

Medalists
| gold medal | Blanka Kiss; Anna Lucz | Hungary |
| silver medal | Sara Ouzande; Teresa Portela | Spain |
| bronze medal | Andreanna Langlois; Toshka Hrebacka | Canada |

The women's K-2 200 metres competition at the 2022 ICF Canoe Sprint World Championships in Dartmouth took place on Lake Banook.

== Schedule ==
The schedule is as follows:

| Date | Time | Round |
|---|---|---|
| Wednesday 3 August 2022 | 14:30 | Heats |
| Friday 5 August 2022 | 12:00 | Semifinal |
| Saturday 6 August 2022 | 12:07 | Final |

== Results ==
=== Heats ===
The fastest three boats in each heat advanced directly to the final.
The next four fastest boats in each heat, plus the fastest remaining boat advanced to the semifinal.

==== Heat 1 ====
| Rank | Canoeist | Country | Time | Notes |
|---|---|---|---|---|
| 1 | Blanka Kiss; Anna Lucz | Hungary | 39.59 | QF |
| 2 | Marta Walczykiewicz; Katarzyna Kołodziejczyk | Poland | 39.80 | QF |
| 3 | Andreanne Langlois; Toshka Hrebacka | Canada | 39.83 | QF |
| 4 | Linnea Stensils; Moa Wikberg | Sweden | 41.89 | QS |
| 5 | Candelaria Sequeira; Lucia Aziz | Argentina | 42.45 | QS |
| 6 | Savanna Wright; Kaitlyn McElroy | United States | 47.43 | QS |

==== Heat 2 ====
| Rank | Canoeist | Country | Time | Notes |
|---|---|---|---|---|
| 1 | Sara Ouzande; Teresa Portela | Spain | 39.92 | QF |
| 2 | Ella Beere; Yale Steinepreis | Australia | 39.99 | QF |
| 3 | Anastasiya Horlova; Liudmyla Kuklinovska | Ukraine | 40.51 | QF |
| 4 | Karina Alanis; Maricela Montemayor | Mexico | 42.17 | QS |
| 5 | Malina Trifescu; Laura Plesca | Romania | 44.65 | QS |

=== Semifinal ===
The fastest three boats advanced to the final.

| Rank | Canoeist | Country | Time | Notes |
|---|---|---|---|---|
| 1 | Linnea Stensils; Moa Wikberg | Sweden | 39.56 | QF |
| 2 | Karina Alanis; Maricela Montemayor | Mexico | 40.32 | QF |
| 3 | Candelaria Sequeira; Lucia Aziz | Argentina | 40.95 | QF |
| 4 | Malina Trifescu; Laura Plesca | Romania | 42.57 | |
| 5 | Savanna Wright; Kaitlyn McElroy | United States | 44.71 | |

=== Final ===
Competitors raced for positions 1 to 9, with medals going to the top three.

| Rank | Canoeist | Country | Time |
|---|---|---|---|
| 1st place, gold medalist(s) | Blanka Kiss; Anna Lucz | Hungary | 38.76 |
| 2nd place, silver medalist(s) | Sara Ouzande; Teresa Portela | Spain | 38.96 |
| 3rd place, bronze medalist(s) | Andreanna Langlois; Toshka Hrebacka | Canada | 38.99 |
| 4 | Marta Walczykiewicz; Katarzyna Kołodziejczyk | Poland | 39.59 |
| 5 | Ella Beere; Yale Steinepreis | Australia | 39.63 |
| 6 | Anastasiya Horlova; Liudmyla Kuklinovska | Ukraine | 40.04 |
| 7 | Linnea Stensils; Moa Wikberg | Sweden | 40.77 |
| 8 | Candelaria Sequeira; Lucia Aziz | Argentina | 41.55 |
| 9 | Karina Alanis; Maricela Montemayor | Mexico | 42.36 |
