= Helena Wiśniewska =

Polish canoeist

Personal information
- Nationality: Polish
- Born: 18 April 1999 (age 27) Bydgoszcz, Poland

Sport
- Country: Poland
- Sport: Sprint kayak
- Event: K-4 500 m
Medal record
Women's canoe sprint
Representing Poland
Olympic Games
Bronze medal – third place	2020 Tokyo	K-4 500 m
World Championships
Gold medal – first place	2023 Duisburg	K-2 200 m
Silver medal – second place	2023 Duisburg	K-2 500 m
Bronze medal – third place	2018 Montemor-o-Velho	K-4 500 m
Bronze medal – third place	2019 Szeged	K-4 500 m
European Games
Bronze medal – third place	2019 Minsk	K-4 500 m

Helena Wiśniewska (born 18 April 1999) is a Polish sprint canoeist. At the 2020 Summer Olympics, she won a bronze medal in Women's K-4 500 metres. At the 2019 European Games, she won a bronze medal.

== Career ==
She participated in the 2018 ICF Canoe Sprint World Championships where she won a medal. In 2019, she and her team won bronze in the ICF Canoe Sprint World Cup.

She competed at the 2019 ICF Canoe Sprint World Championships.
