= Sara Ouzande =

Spanish canoeist (born 1996)

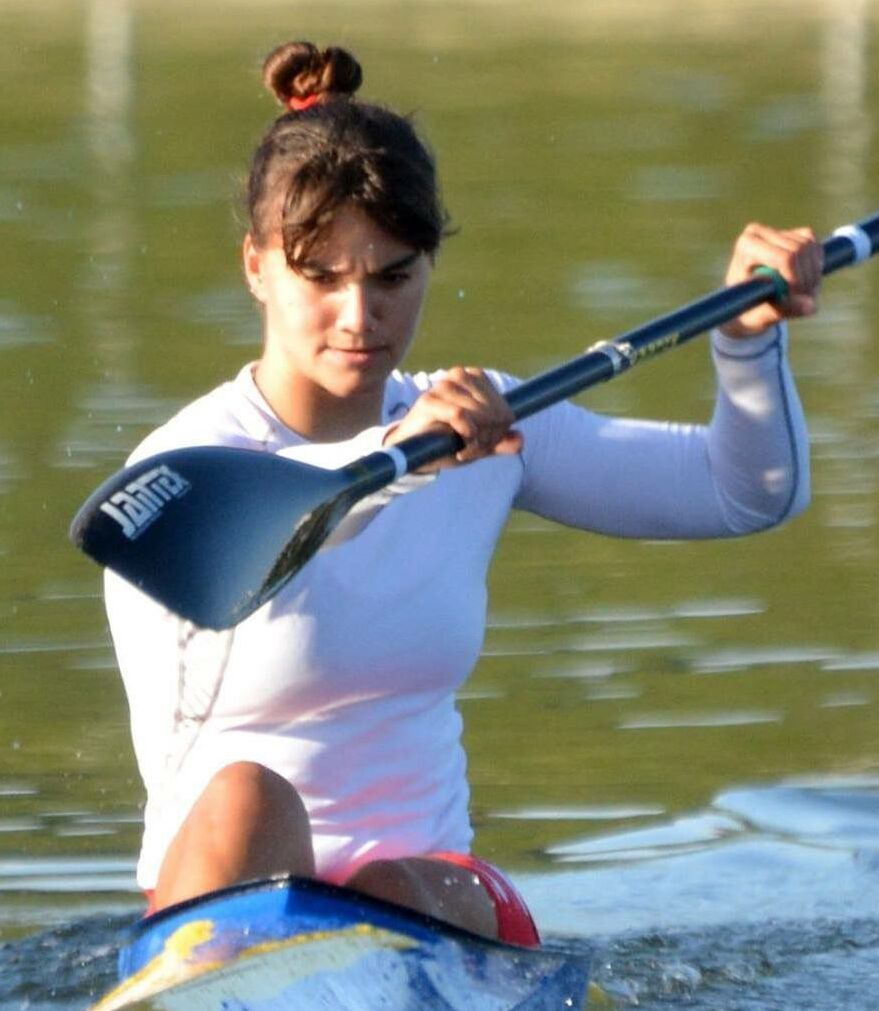
- Ouzande in 2025

Personal information
- Full name: Sara Ouzande Iturralde
- Nationality: Spanish
- Born: 11 August 1996 (age 30)

Sport
- Country: Spain
- Sport: Sprint kayak
- Events: K–2 200 m, K–4 500 m
Medal record
Women's sprint kayak
Representing Spain
World Championships
Gold medal – first place	2025 Milan	K-4 500 m
Silver medal – second place	2022 Dartmouth	K-2 200 m
Silver medal – second place	2026 Poznań	K-4 500 m
Bronze medal – third place	2023 Duisburg	K-4 500 m
Bronze medal – third place	2026 Poznań	K-1 200 m
European Championships
Gold medal – first place	2026 Montemor-o-Velho	K-4 500 m
Silver medal – second place	2025 Racice	K-4 500 m

Sara Ouzande Iturralde (Note: In this Spanish name, the first or paternal surname is Ouzande and the second or maternal family name is Iturralde.) (born 11 August 1996) is a Spanish sprint canoeist. She represented Spain at the 2024 Summer Olympics.

== Career ==
Ouzande represented Spain at the 2024 Summer Olympics in both the K-2 500 metres and K-4 500 metres events, and failed to medal.

In August 2025, Ouzande competed at the 2025 ICF Canoe Sprint World Championships and won a gold medal in the K-4 500 metres with a time of 1:32.58. This was Spain's first gold medal in the event.
