= Anna Puławska =

Polish canoeist (born 1996)

Personal information
- Nationality: Polish
- Born: 7 February 1996 (age 30) Mrągowo, Poland

Sport
- Country: Poland
- Sport: Sprint kayak
- Events: K-1 500 m, K-2 500 m, K-4 500 m
Medal record
Women's canoe sprint
Representing Poland
Olympic Games
Silver medal – second place	2020 Tokyo	K-2 500 m
Bronze medal – third place	2020 Tokyo	K-4 500 m
World Championships
Gold medal – first place	2022 Dartmouth	K-2 500 m
Gold medal – first place	2022 Dartmouth	K-4 500 m
Gold medal – first place	2025 Milan	K-1 500 m
Gold medal – first place	2025 Milan	K-2 500 m
Silver medal – second place	2019 Szeged	K-2 500 m
Silver medal – second place	2023 Duisburg	K-4 500 m
Bronze medal – third place	2018 Montemor-o-Velho	K-4 500 m
Bronze medal – third place	2019 Szeged	K-4 500 m
Bronze medal – third place	2026 Poznań	K-1 500 m
European Games
Gold medal – first place	2023 Kraków–Małopolska	K-2 500 m
Gold medal – first place	2023 Kraków–Małopolska	K-4 500 m
Bronze medal – third place	2019 Minsk	K-4 500 m
European Championships
Gold medal – first place	2022 Munich	K-1 500 m
Gold medal – first place	2022 Munich	K-2 500 m
Gold medal – first place	2022 Munich	K-4 500 m
Gold medal – first place	2025 Racice	K-2 500 m
Silver medal – second place	2017 Plovdiv	K-4 500 m
Silver medal – second place	2021 Poznań	K-2 500 m
Silver medal – second place	2025 Racice	K-1 500 m
Bronze medal – third place	2017 Plovdiv	K-2 500 m
Bronze medal – third place	2018 Belgrade	K-1 500 m

Anna Puławska (born 7 February 1996) is a Polish sprint canoeist. At the 2020 Summer Olympics, she won a bronze medal in Women's K-4 500 metres, and a silver medal in Women's K-2 500 metres.

== Career ==
She participated at the 2018 ICF Canoe Sprint World Championships, winning a medal. She competed at the 2017 ICF Canoe Sprint World Championships, 2018 ICF Canoe Sprint World Championships, and 2019 ICF Canoe Sprint World Championships.
