= Jule Hake =

German canoeist (born 1999)

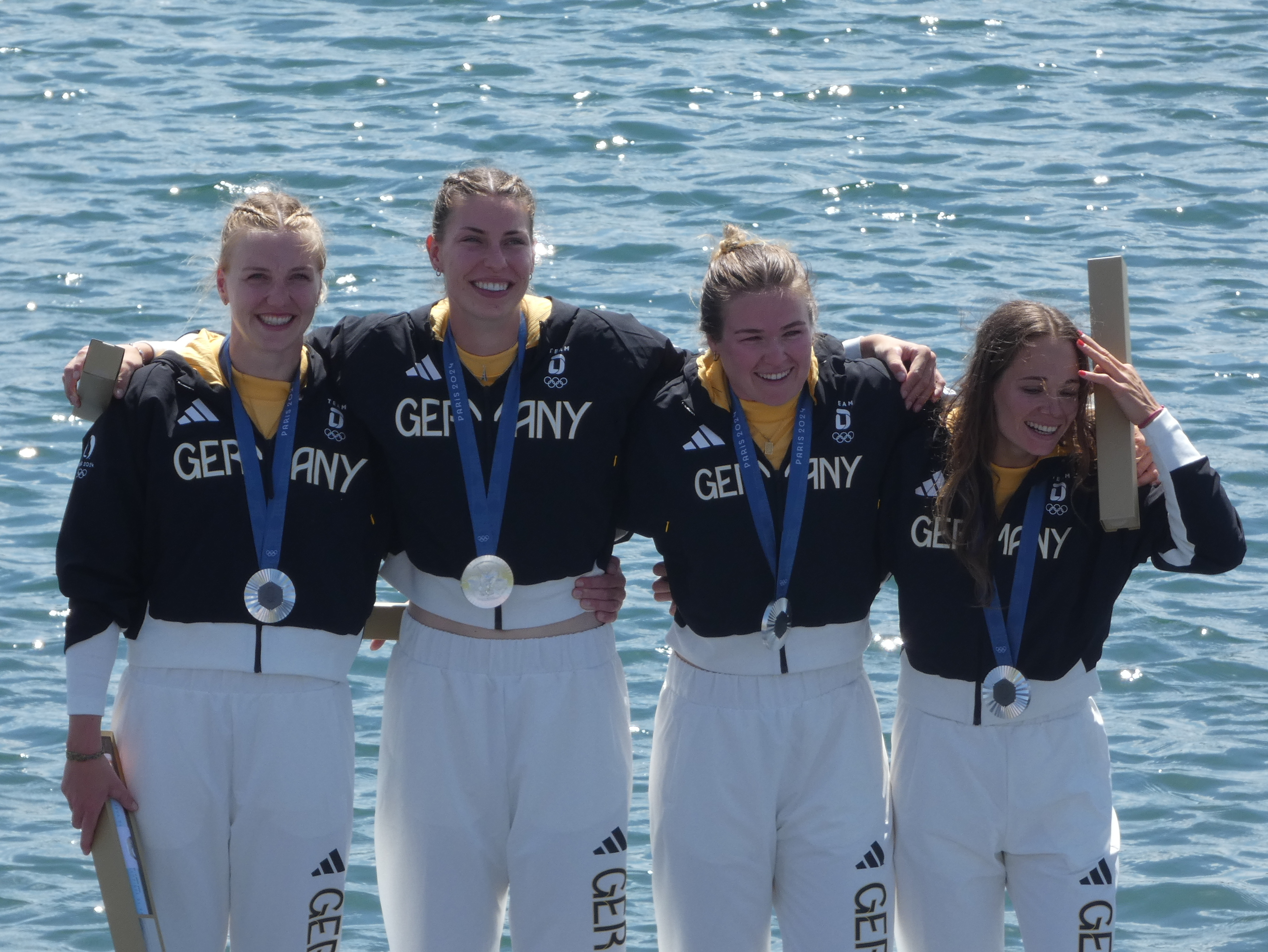

Personal information
- Full name: Jule Marie Hake
- Nationality: German
- Born: 24 September 1999 (age 26) Olfen, Germany
- Height: 1.80 m (5 ft 11 in)
- Weight: 70 kg (154 lb)

Sport
- Country: Germany
- Sport: Sprint kayak
Medal record
Olympic Games
Silver medal – second place	2024 Paris	K-4 500 m
Bronze medal – third place	2024 Paris	K-2 500 m
World Championships
Silver medal – second place	2022 Dartmouth	K-1 5000 m
Silver medal – second place	2022 Dartmouth	K-2 500 m
Silver medal – second place	2023 Duisburg	K-2 200 m
Bronze medal – third place	2022 Dartmouth	K-1 500 m
Bronze medal – third place	2023 Duisburg	K-2 500 m
European Games
Silver medal – second place	2023 Kraków-Małopolska	K-4 500 m
European Championships
Bronze medal – third place	2022 Munich	K-2 200 m
Bronze medal – third place	2022 Munich	K-2 500 m

Jule Marie Hake (born 24 September 1999) is a German canoeist. She competed in the women's K-1 500 metres and the K-4 500 metres events at the 2020 Summer Olympics.
