= Andrea Di Liberto =

Italian sprint canoeist (born 1997)

Personal information
- Full name: Andrea Domenico Di Liberto
- Nationality: Italian
- Born: 19 May 1997 (age 29)

Sport
- Country: Italy
- Sport: Canoe sprint
Medal record
Men's canoe sprint
Representing Italy
World Championships
Gold medal – first place	2021 Copenhagen	K-1 200 m
Gold medal – first place	2026 Poznań	K-1 200 m
Silver medal – second place	2025 Milan	K-1 200 m
European Championships
Gold medal – first place	2021 Poznań	K-2 200 m
Gold medal – first place	2022 Munich	K-2 200 m

Andrea Domenico Di Liberto (born 19 May 1997) is an Italian sprint canoeist.

He competed at the 2021 ICF Canoe Sprint World Championships, winning a gold medal in the K-1 200 m distance.
