= Kailey Harlen =

Australian canoeist (born 2001)

Personal information
- Born: 13 September 2001 (age 24)

Sport
- Country: Australia
- Sport: Canoe sprint
- Event: K–2 500
Medal record
Women's canoe sprint
Representing Australia
World Championships
Gold medal – first place	2026 Poznań	K-2 500 m
Silver medal – second place	2025 Milan	K-2 500 m

Kailey Harlen (born 13 September 2001) is an Australian sprint canoeist.

== Career ==
Harlen began sprint kayaking in 2017 with the Sydney Northern Beaches Kayak Club. In August 2025, she competed at the 2025 ICF Canoe Sprint World Championships and won a silver medal in the K-2 500 metres, along with Natalia Drobot. She was subsequently named the Team of the Year with Drobot at the 2025 Paddle Australia Awards.
