= Francisca Laia =

Portuguese canoeist

Personal information
- Nickname: Kika
- Nationality: Portuguese
- Born: 31 May 1994 (age 32) Abrantes, Médio Tejo, Portugal
- Education: Medicine at University of Coimbra
- Occupation(s): Canoeist, medical doctor
- Height: 1.63 m (5 ft 4 in)
- Weight: 57 kg (126 lb)

Sport
- Country: Portugal
- Sport: Sprint kayak
- Club: CD "Os Patos" (2021–present)
Medal record
Women's sprint kayak
Representing Portugal
World Championships
Silver medal – second place	2021 Copenhagen	K-2 Mix 200 m
Disqualified	2024 Samarkand	K-2 200 m
Disqualified	2024 Samarkand	K-4 Mix 500 m
European Games
Bronze medal – third place	2023 Kraków-Małopolska	K-1 200 m
European Championships
Silver medal – second place	2017 Plovdiv	K-2 200 m

Francisca Laia (born 31 May 1994) is a Portuguese sprint canoeist. She competed in the women's K-1 200 metres event at the 2016 Summer Olympics. She is currently serving a four-year ban for doping, effective until 29 May 2029.

== Career ==
On 19 June 2025, the International Testing Agency (ITA) announced that Laia accepted a four-year ban after an out-of‑competition test, conducted during the 2024 ICF Canoe Sprint World Championships on 25 August 2024, detected a DHCMT metabolite (dehydrochlormethyltestosterone). The ITA, acting on behalf of the International Canoe Federation (ICF), provisionally suspended Laia on 26 September 2024, and following her acceptance of the charges—under Articles 2.1 (presence) and 2.2 (use or attempted use) of the ICF’s anti‑doping rules—imposed an ineligibility period running from 30 May 2025 to 29 May 2029, with all competitive results from 25 August 2024 onwards disqualified, including the silver medal in the K-2 200 m event alongside Teresa Portela and the bronze medal in the mixed K-4 500 m, both won at the World Championships in Samarkand. The sanction was issued via an agreement on consequences and is subject to appeal before the Court of Arbitration for Sport.

== Major results ==
=== Olympic Games ===
Year	K-1 200
2016	8 FB

=== World championships ===
Year	K-2 200	K-2 500	K-4 500	XK-2 200	XK-4 500
2013		7 SF		—N/a	—N/a
2015			8 FB	—N/a	—N/a
2017		5 FB	1 FB	—N/a	—N/a
2018			8 H	—N/a	—N/a
2019			9 SF	—N/a	—N/a
2021	9	6 FB		2nd place, silver medalist(s)	—N/a
2023		2 FB	9	—N/a	—N/a
2024	2nd place, silver medalist(s)	—N/a	—N/a	—N/a	3rd place, bronze medalist(s)
