= Frederikke Mørcke =

Danish canoeist (born 2000)

Personal information
- Full name: Frederikke Hauge Mørcke
- Born: Frederikke Hauge Matthiesen; 3 October 2000 (age 25)
- Spouse: Nicolai Mørcke (m. 2025)

Sport
- Country: Denmark
- Sport: Canoe sprint
- Event: K–1 200, K–2 500
Medal record
Women's canoe sprint
Representing Denmark
World Championships
Gold medal – first place	2023 Duisburg	K-2 500 m
Gold medal – first place	2026 Poznań	K-1 200 m
European Championships
Gold medal – first place	2021 Poznań	K-1 200 m
Gold medal – first place	2021 Poznań	K-1 500 m
Gold medal – first place	2026 Montemor-o-Velho	K-1 200 m
Silver medal – second place	2022 Munich	K-4 500 m
European Games
Silver medal – second place	2023 Kraków-Małopolska	K-2 500 m
Bronze medal – third place	2023 Kraków-Małopolska	K-4 500 m

Frederikke Hauge Mørcke (née Matthiesen; born 3 October 2000) is a Danish sprint canoeist. She represented Denmark at the 2024 Summer Olympics.

== Career ==
In June 2023, Matthiesen competed at the 2023 European Games and won a silver medal in the K-2 500 metres, along with Emma Jørgensen, and a bronze medal in the K-4 500 metres. In August 2023, she competed at the 2023 ICF Canoe Sprint World Championships and won a gold medal in the K-2 500 metres, with a time of 1:39.586, along with Jørgensen.

In May 2024, she was selected to represent Denmark at the 2024 Summer Olympics. She competed in the K-2 500 metres and was eliminated in the quarterfinals.

In June 2026, Mørcke competed at the 2026 Canoe Sprint European Championships and won a gold medal in the K-1 200 metres.

== Personal life ==
Matthiesen married fellow canoeist Nicolai Mørcke in September 2025.
