= Bolette Nyvang Iversen =

Danish canoeist (born 1997)

Personal information
- Full name: Bolette Margrethe Nyvang Iversen
- Nickname: Bo
- Born: 11 August 1997 (age 29)
- Height: 1.82 m (6 ft 0 in)

Sport
- Country: Denmark
- Sport: Canoe sprint
- Club: Hellerup Kajakklub
- Coached by: Zoltán Bakó, Mette Barfod
Medal record
Women's canoe sprint
Representing Denmark
World Championships
Bronze medal – third place	2024 Samarkand	K-1 200 m
European Games
Bronze medal – third place	2023 Kraków-Małopolska	K-4 500 m
European Championships
Silver medal – second place	2022 Munich	K-4 500 m
Bronze medal – third place	2021 Poznań	K-4 500 m
Bronze medal – third place	2024 Szeged	K-1 200 m

Bolette Margrethe Nyvang Iversen (born 11 August 1997) is a Danish canoeist. She competed in the women's K-2 500 metres and the K-4 500 metres events at the 2020 Summer Olympics.

== Major results ==
=== Olympic Games ===
Year	K-2 500	K-4 500
2020	5 QF	8

=== World championships ===
Year	K-1 200	K-1 1000	K-1 5000	K-2 200	K-2 500	K-4 500
2018						8
2019		8	15			
2021				4 SF	7 FB	7
2022					6	5 SF
2023						5 FB
2024	3rd place, bronze medalist(s)				—N/a	—N/a
