= Blanka Kiss =

Hungarian canoeist (born 1996)

Personal information
- Nationality: Hungarian
- Born: 22 June 1996 (age 30) Esztergom, Hungary

Sport
- Country: Hungary
- Sport: Sprint kayak
Medal record
Women's sprint kayak
Representing Hungary
World Championships
Gold medal – first place	2022 Dartmouth	K-2 200 m
Silver medal – second place	2021 Copenhagen	K-2 200 m
Bronze medal – third place	2019 Szeged	K-2 200 m
Bronze medal – third place	2023 Duisburg	K-2 200 m
European Championships
Gold medal – first place	2022 Munich	K-2 200 m
Gold medal – first place	2024 Szeged	K-2 200 m
Bronze medal – third place	2021 Poznań	K-2 200 m
Bronze medal – third place	2022 Munich	K-4 500 m
Bronze medal – third place	2025 Racice	K-2 500 m

Blanka Kiss (born 22 June 1996) is a Hungarian sprint canoeist.

She won a medal at the 2019 ICF Canoe Sprint World Championships.
