= Natalia Drobot =

Australian canoeist (born 2005)

Personal information
- Born: 12 February 2005 (age 21)

Sport
- Country: Australia
- Sport: Canoe sprint
- Event: K–1 500, K–2 500
Medal record
Women's canoe sprint
Representing Australia
World Championships
Gold medal – first place	2026 Poznań	K-2 500 m
Silver medal – second place	2025 Milan	K-1 500 m
Silver medal – second place	2025 Milan	K-2 500 m
Bronze medal – third place	2026 Poznań	K-1 500 m

Natalia Drobot (born 12 February 2005) is an Australian sprint canoeist.

== Career ==
In August 2025, Drobot competed at the 2025 ICF Canoe Sprint World Championships and won a silver medal in the K-1 500 metres with a time of 1:49.73 in her ICF Canoe Sprint World Championships debut. She also won a silver medal in the K-2 500 metres, along with Kailey Harlen. She was subsequently named the Overall Paddler of the Year, Paddler of the Year in Canoe Sprint and Team of the Year with Harlen at 2025 Paddle Australia Awards.

In August 2026, she competed at the 2026 ICF Canoe Sprint World Championships and won a bronze medal in the K-1 500 metres with a time of 1:48.58.
