= Toshka Besharah-Hrebacka =

Canadian kayaker (born 2003)

Personal information
- Full name: Toshka Anna Sadie Besharah-Hrebacka
- Born: April 30, 2003 (age 23) Ottawa, Ontario, Canada

Sport
- Sport: Canoeing
Medal record
Women's sprint kayak
Representing Canada
World Championships
Bronze medal – third place	2022 Dartmouth	K-2 200 metres
Pan American Games
Silver medal – second place	2023 Santiago	K-4 500 metres

Toshka Anna Sadie Besharah-Hrebacka (born April 30, 2003) is a Canadian kayaker.

== Career ==
At the 2022 World Championships, Besharah-Hrebacka won bronze in the K-2 200 metres event. In September 2023, was named to Canada's 2023 Pan American Games team. At the 2023 Pan American Games, Besharah-Hrebacka won silver as part of the Women's K-4 500 metres event. In June 2024, Besharah-Hrebacka was named to Canada's Olympic team.
