= Paulina Paszek =

German canoeist

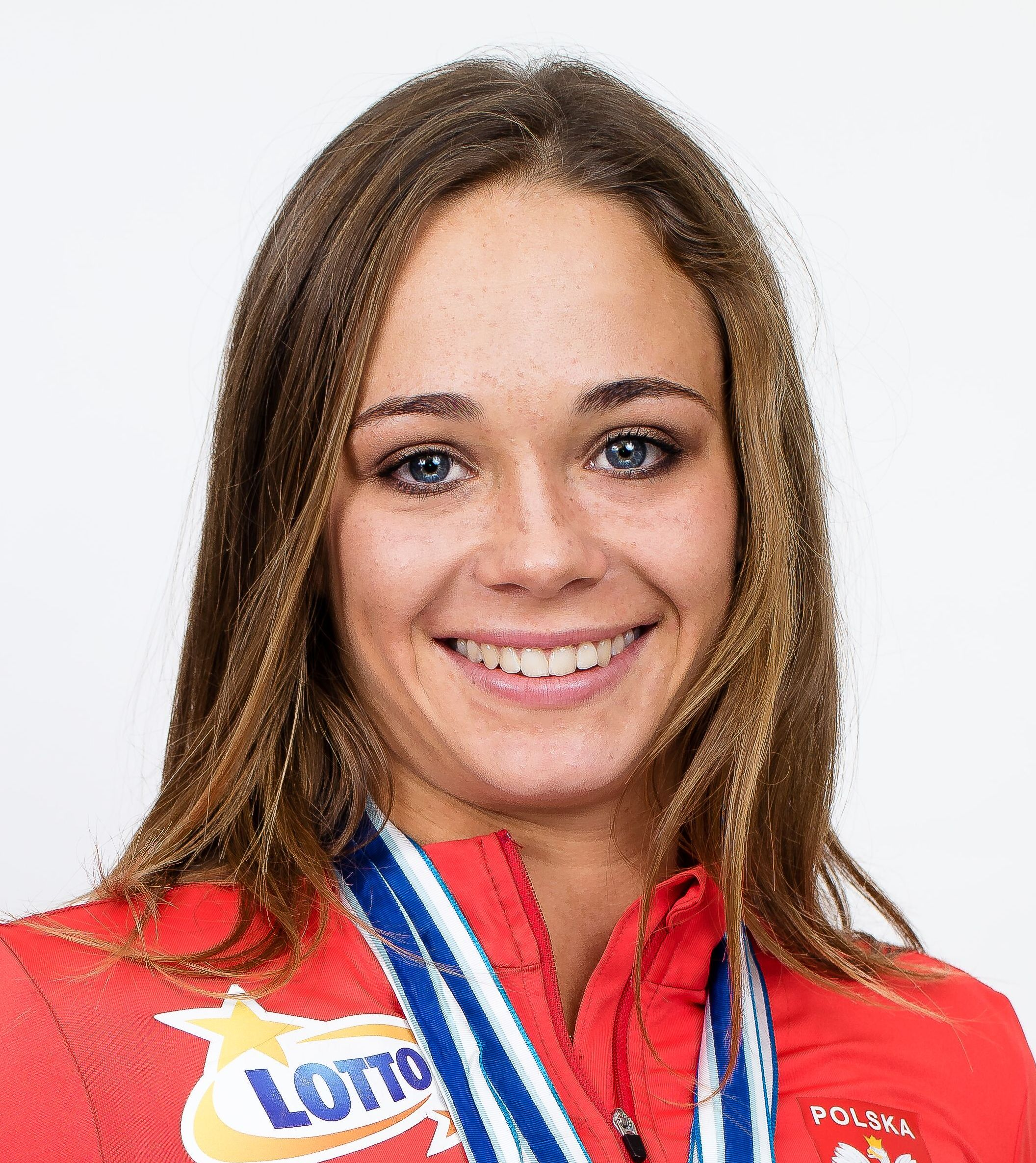
- Paszek in 2017

Personal information
- Nationality: German
- Born: 26 October 1997 (age 28) Bielsko-Biała, Poland

Sport
- Country: Germany
- Sport: Canoe sprint
- Event: Kayaking
Medal record
Representing Germany
Olympic Games
Silver medal – second place	2024 Paris	K-4 500 m
Bronze medal – third place	2024 Paris	K-2 500 m
World Championships
Silver medal – second place	2022 Dartmouth	K-2 500 m
Silver medal – second place	2023 Duisburg	K-2 200 m
Bronze medal – third place	2023 Duisburg	K-2 500 m
Bronze medal – third place	2025 Milan	K-2 500 m
Bronze medal – third place	2026 Poznań	K-2 500 m
Bronze medal – third place	2026 Poznań	K-4 500 m
European Championships
Gold medal – first place	2026 Montemor-o-Velho	K-2 500 m
Silver medal – second place	2025 Racice	K-2 500 m
Bronze medal – third place	2022 Munich	K-2 200 m
Bronze medal – third place	2022 Munich	K-2 500 m
Bronze medal – third place	2025 Racice	K-4 500 m
European Games
Silver medal – second place	2023 Kraków-Małopolska	K-4 500 m
Representing Poland
World Championships
Silver medal – second place	2018 Montemor-o-Velho	K-2 1000 m
Bronze medal – third place	2017 Račice	K-2 1000 m
European Championships
Gold medal – first place	2018 Belgrade	K-2 1000 m

Paulina Paszek (born 26 October 1997) is a German sprint canoeist.

She participated at the 2018 ICF Canoe Sprint World Championships, winning a medal.
