= Samalulu Clifton =

Olympic canoeist for Sāmoa

- Born: Samalulu Fuatino Te Aho Clifton
- Occupation: Canoeist
- Relatives: Tuva'a Clifton

Samalulu Fuatino Te Aho Clifton is an Olympic canoeist who competes for Samoa and is based in New Zealand. She participated in the 2024 Summer Olympics in Paris.

== Life ==
Clifton was raised in Grey Lynn, Auckland, New Zealand. She is of Samoan heritage through her mother's side, with her family having roots in the villages of Malie, Fasito’o Uta, Lano and Safune. As a child, Clifton attended Richmond Road Primary school.

Clifton's older brother, Tuva'a Clifton, also competed at the 2024 Olympics, in the men's canoeing. The siblings trained together for the Olympics. She also has a sister, Aotea, who does kayaking as well.

In 2023, Clifton was one of the inaugural recipients of the Tania Dalton Foundation scholarship programme, which supports young women in sports through funding, development workshops and metorship.

== Canoeing ==
Clifton began her kayaking through participating in Surf Life Saving at Muriwai beach, where she initially learnt how to paddle a surf ski before moving onto kayaks. She has frequently trained at Lake Pupuke. Clifton initially competed for New Zealand before beginning to compete for Samoa instead. Clifton attended both the Oceania development camp and the Oceania Championships in Australia in 2024.

At the 2024 Summer Olympics, Clifton competed in the women's kayak 500 metre event where she reached the quarterfinals. She ranked 37 overall. Clifton and her brother were the only competitors for Sāmoa in the sport of kayaking, with the Sāmoan team having 24 athletes in total.
