= Canoeing at the 2011 Pan American Games =

- Venue: Rowing and Canoeing Course
- Dates: October 26–29
- Competitors: 125 from 14 nations

Canoeing competitions at the 2011 Pan American Games in Guadalajara were held from October 26 to October 29 at the Rowing and Canoeing Course in Ciudad Guzmán. The Canoe Slalom event was dropped due to an anticipated low number of entries. The winners of some events (K1M 200m, K1M 1000m, K1W 200m, K1W 500m, C1M 200m, C1M 1000m) qualified to compete at the canoeing events at the 2012 Summer Olympics in London, Great Britain. The Pan American Games were not a qualification tournament for the Olympics in the events K4M 1,000 and K4W 500.

== Medal summary ==
=== Medal table ===
* Host nation (Mexico)

Rank	Nation	Gold	Silver	Bronze	Total
1	Cuba	4	3	2	9
2	Canada	4	2	1	7
3	United States	2	0	2	4
4	Mexico*	1	1	0	2
5	Ecuador	1	0	0	1
6	Argentina	0	4	3	7
7	Brazil	0	2	2	4
8	Chile	0	0	1	1
8	Venezuela	0	0	1	1
Totals (9 entries)		12	12	12	36

=== Men's events ===
Event	Gold	Silver	Bronze
C-1 200 metres	Richard Dalton; Canada	Nivalter De Jesus; Brazil	Roleysi Baez; Cuba
C-1 1000 metres	Everardo Cristóbal; Mexico	Reydel Ramos; Cuba	Johnnathan Tafra; Chile
C-2 1000 metres	Cuba; Karel Aguilar Chacón; Serguey Torres	Brazil; Erlon Silva; Ronilson Oliveira	Venezuela; Ronny Ratia; Anderson Ramos
K-1 200 metres	César de Cesare; Ecuador	Miguel Correa; Argentina	Ryan Dolan; United States
K-1 1000 metres	Jorge Antonio García; Cuba	Daniel Dal Bo; Argentina	Philippe Duchesneau; Canada
K-2 200 metres	Canada; Ryan Cochrane; Hugues Fournel	Argentina; Miguel Correa; Rubén Rézola	Brazil; Givago Ribeiro; Gilvan Ribeiro
K-2 1000 metres	Canada; Steven Jorens; Richard Dessureault-Dober	Cuba; Reinier Torres; Jorge Antonio García	Argentina; Pablo de Torres; Roberto Geringer Sallette
K-4 1000 metres	Cuba; Osvaldo Labrada; Jorge Antonio Garcia; Reinier Torres; Maikel Daniel Zulueta	Canada; Richard Dessureault-Dober; Philippe Duchesneau; Steven Jorens; Connor Taras	Brazil; Celso Oliveira; Roberto Maehler; Gilvan Ribeiro; Givago Ribeiro

=== Women's events ===
Event	Gold	Silver	Bronze
K-1 200 metres	Carrie Johnson; United States	Darisleydis Amador; Cuba	Sabrina Ameghino; Argentina
K-1 500 metres	Carrie Johnson; United States	Émilie Fournel; Canada	Alexandra Keresztesi; Argentina
K-2 500 metres	Cuba; Dayexi Gandarela; Yulitza Meneses	Argentina; Sabrina Ameghino; Alexandra Keresztesi	United States; Margaret Hogan; Kaitlyn McElroy
K-4 500 metres	Canada; Kathleen Fraser; Kristin Gauthier; Alexa Irvin; Una Lounder	Mexico; Anais Abraham; Karina Alanís; Alicia Guluarte; Maricela Montemayor	Cuba; Darisleydis Amador; Yulitza Meneses; Dayexi Gandarela; Yusmary Mengana

== Schedule ==
All times are Central Daylight Time (UTC−5).

Day	Date	Start	Finish	Event	Phase
Day 13	Wednesday October 26, 2011	9:00	11:55	Women's K-4 500m	Finals
Day 13	Wednesday October 26, 2011	9:00	11:55	Men's K-1 1000m, C-1 1000m, K-2 1000m, C-2 1000m	Preliminaries/Semifinals
Day 13	Wednesday October 26, 2011	9:00	11:55	Women's K-1 500m	Preliminaries/Semifinals
Day 14	Thursday October 27, 2011	9:00	11:35	Men's K-4 1000m	Finals
Day 14	Thursday October 27, 2011	9:00	11:35	Women's K-1 200m	Preliminaries/Semifinals
Day 14	Thursday October 27, 2011	9:00	11:35	Men's K-1 200m, C-1 200m, K-2 200m	Preliminaries/Semifinals
Day 15	Friday October 28, 2011	9:00	11:55	Men's K-1 1000m, C-1 1000m, K-2 1000m, C-2 1000m	Finals
Day 15	Friday October 28, 2011	9:00	11:55	Women's K-1 500m	Finals
Day 16	Saturday October 29, 2011	9:00	10:55	Women's K-1 200m, K-2 500m	Finals
Day 16	Saturday October 29, 2011	9:00	10:55	Men's K-1 200m, C-1 200m, K-2 200m	Finals

== Qualification ==
The first five boats in each event qualified from the 2010 Pan American Championship in Mexico City. This gave a total of 110 out of the 130 athlete quotas used. Out of the remaining 20 spots 10 will go to countries not already qualified and the remaining 10 spots will be determined by the Pan American Canoe Federation. Out of the remaining spots, some will be awarded to Mexico if it has not qualified a boat through the Pan American Championship, therefore reducing the remaining number. An NOC can enter a maximum of 16 athletes (10 men and 6 women).

Nation	Men								Women				Boats	Athletes
Nation	K-1 200	K-2 200	K-1 1000	K-2 1000	K-4 1000	C-1 200	C-1 1000	C-2 1000	K-1 200	K-1 500	K-2 500	K-4 500	Boats	Athletes
Argentina	X	X	X	X	X	X	X		X	X	X	X	11	12
Brazil	X	X	X	X	X	X	X	X	X	X	X	X	12	15
Canada	X	X	X	X	X	X	X	X	X	X	X	X	12	16
Chile		X		X		X	X				X		5	6
Colombia	X	X	X	X	X	X	X	X	X	X	X	X	12	12
Cuba	X	X	X	X	X	X	X	X	X	X	X	X	12	15
Ecuador	X	X				X			X	X	X		6	5
Guatemala	X	X		X					X	X			5	4
Mexico	X	X	X	X	X	X	X	X	X	X	X	X	12	16
Puerto Rico	X	X	X						X				4	3
Trinidad and Tobago	X												1	1
United States	X	X	X	X	X	X	X		X	X	X		10	9
Venezuela	X	X	X		X	X	X	X	X	X	X	X	11	11
Total: 13 NOCs	12	12	9	9	8	10	9	6	11	10	10	7	111	125

== See also ==
- Canoeing at the 2012 Summer Olympics
