= Canoeing at the 2011 Pan American Games – Women's K-2 500 metres =

Women's K-2 500 metres at the 2011 Pan American Games
- Venue: Canoe & Rowing Course
- Dates: October 28–29
- Competitors: 20 from 10 nations

Medalists
Gold medal	Dayexi Gandarela; Yulitza Meneses	Cuba
Silver medal	Sabrina Ameghino; Alexandra Keresztesi	Argentina
Bronze medal	Margaret Hogan; Kaitlyn McElroy	United States

The women's K-2 500 metres canoeing event at the 2011 Pan American Games was held on October 28–29 at the Canoe & Rowing Course in Ciudad Guzman.

== Schedule ==
All times are local Central Daylight Time (UTC−5)

Date	Time	Round
October 28, 2011	9:00	Heats
October 28, 2011	10:30	Semifinal
October 29, 2011	9:00	Final

== Results ==
=== Heats ===
Qualification Rules: 1..3->Final, 4..7 and 8th best time->Semifinals, Rest Out

==== Heat 1 ====
Rank	Athletes	Country	Time	Notes
1	Dayexi Gandarela, Yulitza Meneses	Cuba	1:49.502	QF
2	Kathleen Fraser, Kristin Ann Gauthier	Canada	1:50.059	QF
3	Karina Alanis, Maricela Montemayor	Mexico	1:51.793	QF
4	Angélica Jimenez, Zulmarys Sánchez	Venezuela	1:54.533	QS
5	Ysumy Orellana, Fabiola Zamorano	Chile	1:56.389	QS

==== Heat 2 ====
Rank	Athletes	Country	Time	Notes
1	Margaret Hogan, Kaitlyn McElroy	United States	1:49.517	QF
2	Sabrina Ameghino, Alexandra Keresztesi	Argentina	1:49.859	QF
3	Naiane Pereira, Ana Vergutz	Brazil	1:53.948	QF
4	Aura María Ospina, Ruth Niño	Colombia	1:54.439	QS
5	Lissette Espinoza, Stefanie Perdomo	Ecuador	2:07.535	QS

=== Semifinal ===
Qualification Rules: 1..3->Final, Rest Out

Rank	Athletes	Country	Time	Notes
1	Angélica Jimenez, Zulmarys Sánchez	Venezuela	1:52.848	QF
2	Ysumy Orellana, Fabiola Zamorano	Chile	1:54.278	QF
3	Aura María Ospina, Ruth Niño	Colombia	1:56.173	QF
4	Lissette Espinoza, Stefanie Perdomo	Ecuador	1:58.879	

=== Final ===
Rank	Rowers	Country	Time	Notes
1st place, gold medalist(s)	Dayexi Gandarela, Yulitza Meneses	Cuba	1:47.332	
2nd place, silver medalist(s)	Sabrina Ameghino, Alexandra Keresztesi	Argentina	1:48.005	
3rd place, bronze medalist(s)	Margaret Hogan, Kaitlyn McElroy	United States	1:48.718	
4	Karina Alanis, Maricela Montemayor	Mexico	1:49.620	
5	Kathleen Fraser, Kristin Ann Gauthier	Canada	1:49.638	
6	Naiane Pereira, Ana Vergutz	Brazil	1:53.114	
7	Angélica Jimenez, Zulmarys Sánchez	Venezuela	1:54.330	
8	Ysumy Orellana, Fabiola Zamorano	Chile	1:54.479	
9	Aura María Ospina, Ruth Niño	Colombia	1:54.985	
