= Canoeing at the 2012 Summer Olympics – Women's K-2 500 metres =

Women's K-2 500 metres at the Games of the XXX Olympiad
- Venue: Eton Dorney
- Date: 7 to 9 August
- Competitors: 34 from 17 nations
- Winning time: 1:42.213

Medalists
1st place, gold medalist(s)		Franziska Weber; Tina Dietze	Germany
2nd place, silver medalist(s)		Katalin Kovács; Natasa Dusev-Janics	Hungary
3rd place, bronze medalist(s)		Karolina Naja; Beata Mikołajczyk	Poland

The women's canoe sprint K-2 500 metres competition at the 2012 Olympic Games in London took place between 7 and 9 August at Eton Dorney.

Franziska Weber and Tina Dietze, representing Germany, won the gold medal. Hungary's Katalin Kovács and Natasa Dusev-Janics took silver and the bronze medal was won by Karolina Naja and Beata Mikołajczyk from Poland.

== Competition format ==
The competition comprised heats, semi-finals, and a final round. The top five boats from each heat, and the fastest loser, advanced to the semi-finals. The top four boats in each semi-final advanced to the "A" final, and competed for medals. A placing "B" final was held for the other semi-finalists.

== Schedule ==
All times are British Summer Time (UTC+01:00)

Date	Time	Round
Tuesday 7 August 2012	10:28; 11:30	Heats; Semi-finals
Thursday 9 August 2012	10:35	Finals

== Results ==
=== Heats ===
The five fastest boats and the best-timed loser qualified to the semi-finals.

==== Heat 1 ====
Rank	Canoer	Country	Time	Notes
1	Josefin Nordlöw; Karin Johansson	Sweden	1:44.437	Q
2	Natalia Lobova; Vera Sobetova	Russia	1:45.710	Q
3	Iuliana Paleu; Irina Lauric	Romania	1:46.001	Q
4	Naomi Flood; Lyndsie Fogarty	Australia	1:46.554	Q
5	Abigail Edmonds; Louisa Sawers	Great Britain	1:46.564	Q
6	Yulitza Meneses; Dayexi Gandarela	Cuba	1:46.587	q

==== Heat 2 ====
Rank	Canoer	Country	Time	Notes
1	Wu Yanan; Zhou Yu	China	1:43.448	Q
2	Franziska Weber; Tina Dietze	Germany	1:44.195	Q
3	Nikolina Moldovan; Olivera Moldovan	Serbia	1:44.335	Q
4	Volha Khudzenka; Maryna Pautaran	Belarus	1:44.568	Q
5	Ivana Kmeťová; Martina Kohlová	Slovakia	1:45.073	Q
6	Shinobu Kitamoto; Asumi Ohmura	Japan	1:47.323	

==== Heat 3 ====
Rank	Canoer	Country	Time	Notes
1	Katalin Kovács; Natasa Dusev-Janics	Hungary	1:43.984	Q
2	Joana Vasconcelos; Beatriz Gomes	Portugal	1:44.660	Q
3	Lisa Carrington; Erin Taylor	New Zealand	1:44.870	Q
4	Yvonne Schuring; Viktoria Schwarz	Austria	1:46.374	Q
5	Karolina Naja; Beata Mikołajczyk	Poland	1:48.271	Q

=== Semifinals ===
The fastest four canoeists in each semi-final qualified for the 'A' final. The slowest four qualified for the placing 'B' final.

==== Semifinal 1 ====
Rank	Canoer	Country	Time	Notes
1	Franziska Weber; Tina Dietze	Germany	1:41.543	Q
2	Katalin Kovács; Natasa Dusev-Janics	Hungary	1:41.613	Q
3	Karolina Naja; Beata Mikołajczyk	Poland	1:41.873	Q
4	Lisa Carrington; Erin Taylor	New Zealand	1:42.764	Q
5	Volha Khudzenka; Maryna Pautaran	Belarus	1:43.152	
6	Josefin Nordlöw; Karin Johansson	Sweden	1:44.025	
7	Abigail Edmonds; Louisa Sawers	Great Britain	1:46.025	
8	Iuliana Paleu; Irina Lauric	Romania	1:49.216	

==== Semifinal 2 ====
Rank	Canoer	Country	Time	Notes
1	Wu Yanan; Zhou Yu	China	1:41.863	Q
2	Yvonne Schuring; Viktoria Schwarz	Austria	1:42.317	Q
3	Joana Vasconcelos; Beatriz Gomes	Portugal	1:43.305	Q
4	Nikolina Moldovan; Olivera Moldovan	Serbia	1:43.586	Q
5	Ivana Kmeťová; Martina Kohlová	Slovakia	1:43.653	
6	Natalia Lobova; Vera Sobetova	Russia	1:44.660	
7	Naomi Flood; Lyndsie Fogarty	Australia	1:45.372	
8	Yulitza Meneses; Dayexi Gandarela	Cuba	1:51.428	

=== Finals ===
==== Final B ====
Rank	Canoer	Country	Time	Notes
1	Volha Khudzenka; Maryna Pautaran	Belarus	1:44.407	
2	Josefin Nordlöw; Karin Johansson	Sweden	1:45.367	
3	Abigail Edmonds; Louisa Sawers	Great Britain	1:46.341	
4	Naomi Flood; Lyndsie Fogarty	Australia	1:47.650	
5	Ivana Kmeťová; Martina Kohlová	Slovakia	1:47.683	
6	Yulitza Meneses; Dayexi Gandarela	Cuba	1:50.124	
7	Natalia Lobova; Vera Sobetova	Russia	1:52.277	
8	Iuliana Paleu; Irina Lauric	Romania	1:52.468	

==== Final A ====
Rank	Canoer	Country	Time	Notes
1st place, gold medalist(s)	Franziska Weber; Tina Dietze	Germany	1:42.213	
2nd place, silver medalist(s)	Katalin Kovács; Natasa Dusev-Janics	Hungary	1:43.278	
3rd place, bronze medalist(s)	Karolina Naja; Beata Mikołajczyk	Poland	1:44.000	
4	Wu Yanan; Zhou Yu	China	1:44.136	
5	Yvonne Schuring; Viktoria Schwarz	Austria	1:44.785	
6	Joana Vasconcelos; Beatriz Gomes	Portugal	1:44.924	
7	Lisa Carrington; Erin Taylor	New Zealand	1:46.290	
8	Nikolina Moldovan; Olivera Moldovan	Serbia	1:48.941	
