= Canoeing at the 2012 Summer Olympics – Women's K-1 200 metres =

Women's canoe sprint K-1 200 metres at the Games of the XXX Olympiad
- Venue: Eton Dorney
- Date: 10 to 11 August
- Competitors: 29 from 29 nations
- Winning time: 44.638

Medalists
| 1st place, gold medalist(s) | | Lisa Carrington | New Zealand |
| 2nd place, silver medalist(s) | | Inna Osypenko | Ukraine |
| 3rd place, bronze medalist(s) | | Nataša Dušev-Janić | Hungary |

The women's canoe sprint K-1 200 metres at the 2012 Olympic Games in London took place between 10 and 11 August at Eton Dorney.

== Competition format ==
The competition comprised heats, semifinals, and a final round.

== Schedule ==
All times are British Summer Time (UTC+01:00)

| Date | Time | Round |
|---|---|---|
| Friday 10 August 2012 | 10:19; 11:51 | Heats; Semifinals |
| Saturday 11 August 2012 | 10:14 | Finals |

== Results ==
=== Heats ===
The six best placed boats in each heat advance to the semifinals.

==== Heat 1 ====
| Rank | Canoer | Country | Time | Notes |
|---|---|---|---|---|
| 1 | Nataša Dušev-Janić | Hungary | 41.221 | Q, OB |
| 2 | Lisa Carrington | New Zealand | 41.401 | Q |
| 3 | Natalia Lobova | Russia | 42.447 | Q |
| 4 | Henriette Engel Hansen | Denmark | 42.866 | Q |
| 5 | Émilie Fournel | Canada | 43.117 | Q |
| 6 | Carrie Johnson | United States | 43.355 | Q |
| 7 | Norma Murabito | Italy | 43.820 | |
| 8 | Geraldine Lee Wei Ling | Singapore | 45.552 | |

==== Heat 2 ====
| Rank | Canoer | Country | Time | Notes |
|---|---|---|---|---|
| 1 | Maria Teresa Portela | Spain | 41.263 | Q |
| 2 | Marta Walczykiewicz | Poland | 42.290 | Q |
| 3 | Nikolina Moldovan | Serbia | 42.383 | Q |
| 4 | Jess Walker | Great Britain | 42.388 | Q |
| 5 | Darisleydis Amador | Cuba | 42.761 | Q |
| 6 | Zhou Yu | China | 42.885 | Q |
| 7 | Arezoo Hakimi | Iran | 44.576 | |

==== Heat 3 ====
| Rank | Canoer | Country | Time | Notes |
|---|---|---|---|---|
| 1 | Inna Osypenko | Ukraine | 42.119 | Q |
| 2 | Sofia Paldanius | Sweden | 42.596 | Q |
| 3 | Teresa Portela | Portugal | 42.673 | Q |
| 4 | Silke Hörmann | Germany | 42.697 | Q |
| 5 | Natalya Sergeyeva | Kazakhstan | 43.257 | Q |
| 6 | Ivana Kmeťová | Slovakia | 43.445 | Q |
| 7 | Tiffany Kruger | South Africa | 46.122 | |

==== Heat 4 ====
| Rank | Canoer | Country | Time | Notes |
|---|---|---|---|---|
| 1 | Shinobu Kitamoto | Japan | 42.007 | Q |
| 2 | Alana Nicholls | Australia | 42.453 | Q |
| 3 | Jenni Mikkonen | Finland | 42.656 | Q |
| 4 | Špela Ponomarenko Janić | Slovenia | 42.884 | Q |
| 5 | Marharyta Tsishkevich | Belarus | 43.841 | Q |
| 6 | Yuliya Borzova | Uzbekistan | 44.872 | Q |
| 7 | Afef Ben Ismail | Tunisia | 48.998 | |

=== Semifinals ===
The fastest two canoeists in each semifinal qualify for the 'A' final alongside the two fastest third placed boats. The last third placed boat alongside, the fourth and fifth placed boats and the fastest sixth placed boat qualify for the 'B' final.

==== Semifinal 1 ====
| Rank | Canoer | Country | Time | Notes |
|---|---|---|---|---|
| 1 | Lisa Carrington | New Zealand | 40.528 | Q, OB |
| 2 | Maria Teresa Portela | Spain | 40.898 | Q |
| 3 | Inna Osypenko | Ukraine | 41.360 | q |
| 4 | Jenni Mikkonen | Finland | 41.859 | |
| 5 | Špela Ponomarenko Janić | Slovenia | 42.209 | |
| 6 | Zhou Yu | China | 42.279 | |
| 7 | Natalya Sergeyeva | Kazakhstan | 42.602 | |
| 8 | Carrie Johnson | United States | 43.321 | |

==== Semifinal 2 ====
| Rank | Canoer | Country | Time | Notes |
|---|---|---|---|---|
| 1 | Natalia Lobova | Russia | 41.413 | Q |
| 2 | Jess Walker | Great Britain | 41.734 | Q |
| 3 | Shinobu Kitamoto | Japan | 41.816 | |
| 4 | Nikolina Moldovan | Serbia | 42.394 | |
| 5 | Ivana Kmeťová | Slovakia | 42.510 | |
| 6 | Sofia Paldanius | Sweden | 42.688 | |
| 7 | Henriette Engel Hansen | Denmark | 42.821 | |
| 8 | Marharyta Tsishkevich | Belarus | 43.033 | |

==== Semifinal 3 ====
| Rank | Canoer | Country | Time | Notes |
|---|---|---|---|---|
| 1 | Nataša Dušev-Janić | Hungary | 40.570 | Q |
| 2 | Marta Walczykiewicz | Poland | 40.905 | Q |
| 3 | Teresa Portela | Portugal | 41.562 | q |
| 4 | Alana Nicholls | Australia | 41.595 | |
| 5 | Darisleydis Amador | Cuba | 41.949 | |
| 6 | Silke Hörmann | Germany | 42.005 | |
| 7 | Émilie Fournel | Canada | 43.030 | |
| 8 | Yuliya Borzova | Uzbekistan | 44.426 | |

=== Finals ===
==== Final B ====
| Rank | Canoer | Country | Time | Notes |
|---|---|---|---|---|
| 1 | Jenni Mikkonen | Finland | 44.643 | |
| 2 | Špela Ponomarenko | Slovenia | 44.953 | |
| 3 | Nikolina Moldovan | Serbia | 45.064 | |
| 4 | Darisleydis Amador | Cuba | 45.099 | |
| 5 | Shinobu Kitamoto | Japan | 45.387 | |
| 6 | Ivana Kmeťová | Slovakia | 45.556 | |
| 7 | Silke Hörmann | Germany | 45.686 | |
| 8 | Alana Nicholls | Australia | 45.819 | |

==== Final A ====
| Rank | Canoer | Country | Time | Notes |
|---|---|---|---|---|
| 1st place, gold medalist(s) | Lisa Carrington | New Zealand | 44.638 | |
| 2nd place, silver medalist(s) | Inna Osypenko | Ukraine | 45.053 | |
| 3rd place, bronze medalist(s) | Nataša Dušev-Janić | Hungary | 45.128 | |
| 4 | Maria Teresa Portela | Spain | 45.326 | |
| 5 | Marta Walczykiewicz | Poland | 45.500 | |
| 6 | Natalia Lobova | Russia | 45.961 | |
| 7 | Jess Walker | Great Britain | 46.161 | |
| 8 | Teresa Portela | Portugal | 46.549 | |
