= Canoeing at the 2015 Pan American Games – Women's K-4 500 metres =

Women's K-4 500 metres at the 2015 Pan American Games
- Venue: Welland Pan Am Flatwater Centre
- Dates: July 11
- Competitors: 28 from 7 nations
- Winning time: 1:36.495

Medalists
Gold medal	Émilie Fournel; Kathleen Fraser; Michelle Russell; Hannah Vaughan	Canada
Silver medal	Daniela Martin; Yurieni Guerra; Lisandra Torres; Jessica Hernandez	Cuba
Bronze medal	Maria Magdalena Garro; Sabrina Ameghino; Alexandra Keresztesi; Brenda Rojas	Argentina

The women's K-4 500 metres canoeing event at the 2015 Pan American Games was held on July 11 at the Welland Pan Am Flatwater Centre in Welland. The defending Pan American Games champion are Kathleen Fraser, Kristin Gauthier, Alexa Irvin and Una Lounder of Canada.

== Qualification ==
The top five boats including the host nation of Canada at the 2014 Pan American Championships in Mexico City, Mexico qualified to compete at the games. All other countries that competed, qualified through the reallocation process.

== Schedule ==
The following is the competition schedule for the event:

All times are Eastern Daylight Time (UTC−4)

Date	Time	Round
Saturday 11 July	9:00	Final

== Results ==
=== Final ===
Rank	Rowers	Country	Time	Notes
1st place, gold medalist(s)	Émilie Fournel; Kathleen Fraser; Michelle Russell; Hannah Vaughan	Canada	1:36.495	
2nd place, silver medalist(s)	Daniela Martin; Yurieni Guerra; Lisandra Torres; Jessica Hernandez	Cuba	1:37.665	
3rd place, bronze medalist(s)	Maria Magdalena Garro; Sabrina Ameghino; Alexandra Keresztesi; Brenda Rojas	Argentina	1:37.721	
4	Beatriz Briones; Karina Alanis; Maricela Montemayor; Brenda Gutierrez	Mexico	1:38.007	
5	Edileia Matos dos Reis; Mariane dos Santos da Silva; Ariela Cesar Pinto; Ana Paula Vergutz	Brazil	1:41.297	
6	Yocelin Canache Cabeza; Angelica Jiminez Castillo; Mara Guerrero Gil; Zulmarys Sanchez Mendoza	Venezuela	1:43.647	
7	Ruth Niño; Tatiana Muñoz; Laura Pacheco; Katerine Moreno	Colombia	1:45.674	
