= Canoeing at the 2011 Pan American Games – Women's K-1 200 metres =

Women's K-1 200 metres at the 2011 Pan American Games
- Venue: Canoe & Rowing Course
- Dates: October 27–29
- Competitors: 12 from 12 nations

Medalists
Gold medal	Carrie Johnson	United States
Silver medal	Darisleydis Amador	Cuba
Bronze medal	Sabrina Ameghino	Argentina

The women's K-1 200 metres canoeing event at the 2011 Pan American Games was held on October 27–29 at the Canoe & Rowing Course in Ciudad Guzman.

== Schedule ==
All times are local Central Daylight Time (UTC−5)

Date	Time	Round
October 27, 2011	12:25	Heats
October 27, 2011	13:25	Semifinal
October 29, 2011	10:30	Final

== Results ==
=== Heats ===
Qualification Rules: 1..3->Final, 4..7 and 8th best time->Semifinals, Rest Out

==== Heat 1 ====
Rank	Athletes	Country	Time	Notes
1	Darisleydis Amador	Cuba	41.876	QF
2	Sabrina Ameghino	Argentina	42.268	QF
3	Zulmarys Sánchez	Venezuela	42.850	QF
4	Carla Salinas	Mexico	43.780	QS
5	Ysumy Orellana	Chile	44.837	QS
6	Claudia Pérez	Guatemala	51.577	QS

==== Heat 2 ====
Rank	Athletes	Country	Time	Notes
1	Carrie Johnson	United States	41.827	QF
2	Émilie Fournel	Canada	42.130	QF
3	Ariela Pinto	Brazil	43.277	QF
4	Tatiana Muñoz	Colombia	44.014	QS
5	Maricarmen Rivera	Puerto Rico	45.359	QS
6	Stefanie Perdomo	Ecuador	46.084	QS

=== Semifinal ===
Qualification Rules: 1..3->Final, Rest Out

Rank	Athletes	Country	Time	Notes
1	Carla Salinas	Mexico	43.173	QF
2	Tatiana Muñoz	Colombia	43.736	QF
3	Maricarmen Rivera	Puerto Rico	44.416	QF
4	Ysumy Orellana	Chile	44.480	
5	Stefanie Perdomo	Ecuador	45.638	
6	Claudia Pérez	Guatemala	51.859	

=== Final ===
Rank	Rowers	Country	Time	Notes
1st place, gold medalist(s)	Carrie Johnson	United States	41.803	
2nd place, silver medalist(s)	Darisleydis Amador	Cuba	41.840	
3rd place, bronze medalist(s)	Sabrina Ameghino	Argentina	42.685	
4	Émilie Fournel	Canada	43.021	
5	Ariela Pinto	Brazil	43.706	
6	Zulmarys Sánchez	Venezuela	43.808	
7	Carla Salinas	Mexico	43.875	
8	Tatiana Muñoz	Colombia	45.333	
9	Maricarmen Rivera	Puerto Rico	45.993	
