= Canoeing at the 2011 Pan American Games – Women's K-1 500 metres =

Women's K-1 500 metres at the 2011 Pan American Games
- Venue: Canoe & Rowing Course
- Dates: October 26–28
- Competitors: 10 from 10 nations

Medalists
Gold medal	Carrie Johnson	United States
Silver medal	Émilie Fournel	Canada
Bronze medal	Alexandra Keresztesi	Argentina

The women's K-1 500 metres canoeing event at the 2011 Pan American Games was held on October 26–28 at the Canoe & Rowing Course in Ciudad Guzman.

== Schedule ==
All times are local Central Daylight Time (UTC−5)

Date	Time	Round
October 26, 2011	11:10	Heats
October 26, 2011	12:10	Semifinal
October 28, 2011	11:45	Final

== Results ==
=== Heats ===
Qualification Rules: 1..3->Final, 4..7 and 8th best time->Semifinals, Rest Out

==== Heat 1 ====
Rank	Athletes	Country	Time	Notes
1	Carrie Johnson	United States	1:59.353	QF
2	Naiane Pereira	Brazil	2:00.639	QF
3	Tatiana Muñoz	Colombia	2:03.568	QF
4	Stefanie Perdomo	Ecuador	2:07.243	QS
5	Daisy Mendoza	Guatemala	2:18.916	QS

==== Heat 2 ====
Rank	Athletes	Country	Time	Notes
1	Émilie Fournel	Canada	1:57.386	QF
2	Alexandra Keresztesi	Argentina	1:58.951	QF
3	Annes Peñate	Cuba	2:00.406	QF
4	Carla Salinas	Mexico	2:00.729	QS
5	Eliana Escalona	Venezuela	2:03.292	QS

=== Semifinal ===
Qualification Rules: 1..3->Final, Rest Out

Rank	Athletes	Country	Time	Notes
1	Carla Salinas	Mexico	2:06.704	QF
2	Stefanie Perdomo	Ecuador	2:08.659	QF
3	Eliana Escalona	Venezuela	2:11.311	QF
	Daisy Mendoza	Guatemala	DSQ	

=== Final ===
Rank	Rowers	Country	Time	Notes
1st place, gold medalist(s)	Carrie Johnson	United States	1:54.243	
2nd place, silver medalist(s)	Émilie Fournel	Canada	1:54.900	
3rd place, bronze medalist(s)	Alexandra Keresztesi	Argentina	1:55.764	
4	Naiane Pereira	Brazil	1:57.122	
5	Annes Peñate	Cuba	1:59.054	
6	Carla Salinas	Mexico	2:00.106	
7	Eliana Escalona	Venezuela	2:01.218	
8	Tatiana Muñoz	Colombia	2:02.118	
9	Stefanie Perdomo	Ecuador	2:05.735	
