= Joana Vasconcelos (canoeist) =

Portuguese canoeist

Personal information
- Full name: Joana Sofia Barbosa Vasconcelos
- Nationality: Portuguese
- Born: 22 February 1991 (age 35) Vila Nova de Gaia, Portugal
- Height: 1.69 m (5 ft 6 1/2 in)
- Weight: 65 kg (143 lb)

Sport
- Sport: Canoeing
- Event: Sprint canoe
- Club: Benfica
Medal record
Women's canoe sprint
European Championships
| Gold medal – first place | 2018 Belgrade | K-2 200 m |
| Silver medal – second place | 2017 Plovdiv | K-2 200 m |
| Bronze medal – third place | 2012 Zagreb | K-2 200 m |
Mediterranean Games
| Silver medal – second place | 2018 Taragona | K-1 500 m |
U23 World Championships
| Silver medal – second place | 2013 Niagara | K-1 200 m |
U23 European Championships
| Bronze medal – third place | 2014 Szeged | K-1 200 m |

Joana Sofia Barbosa Vasconcelos (born 22 February 1991) is a Portuguese sprint canoer who has competed since the 2010s. At club level, she represents Benfica.

== Career ==
Born in Vila Nova de Gaia, Vasconcelos started canoeing in Clube Náutico de Crestuma, where she won the ICF Canoe Kayak Sprint Junior World Championships in K-1 1000m class that took place in Moscow in 2009. The 18-year-old then moved to Benfica in 2010, and currently studies and practises at the Center for High Performance in Montemor-o-Velho.

She won a bronze medal in the K-2 200 m event at the 2012 Canoe Sprint European Championships in Zagreb.

Vasconcelos qualified for London 2012 in K4 500, K2 500 and K2 200 in the 2011 ICF Canoe Sprint World Championships. In the 2012 Summer Olympics, she ended 6th in Women's K-2 500 metres race along Beatriz Gomes and also 6th in the Women's K-4 500 metres along with Teresa Portela, Helena Rodrigues and Beatriz Gomes.

Awards
| Preceded by Miguel Arraiolos | Portuguese Young Promise; 2009–2010 | Succeeded by Francisca Laia |
| Preceded by 1000 meter K2 team (Emanuel Silva and Fernando Pimenta) | Portuguese Team of the Year; 2013 (500 meter K2 team with Beatriz Gomes) | Succeeded by Portugal national table tennis team |
