= Canoeing at the 2015 Pan American Games – Women's K-2 500 metres =

Women's K-2 500 metres at the 2015 Pan American Games
- Venue: Welland Pan Am Flatwater Centre
- Dates: July 14
- Competitors: 18 from 9 nations
- Winning time: 1:48.653

Medalists
Gold medal	Yusmari Mengana; Yurieni Guerra	Cuba
Silver medal	Sabrina Ameghino; Alexandra Keresztesi	Argentina
Bronze medal	Karina Alanís; Maricela Montemayor	Mexico

The women's K-2 500 metres canoeing event at the 2015 Pan American Games was held on 14 of July at the Welland Pan Am Flatwater Centre in Welland.

== Schedule ==
The following is the competition schedule for the event:

All times are Eastern Daylight Time (UTC−4)

Date	Time	Round
July 14, 2015	9:05	Final

== Results ==
=== Final ===
Rank	Rowers	Country	Time	Notes
1st place, gold medalist(s)	Yusmari Mengana; Yurieni Guerra	Cuba	1:48.653	
2nd place, silver medalist(s)	Sabrina Ameghino; Alexandra Keresztesi	Argentina	1:49.485	
3rd place, bronze medalist(s)	Karina Alanís; Maricela Montemayor	Mexico	1:50.735	
4	Émilie Fournel; Hannah Vaughan	Canada	1:50.787	
5	Maggie Hogan; Kaitlyn McElroy	United States	1:52.536	
6	Beatriz Renata Vergutz; Ana Paula Vergutz	Brazil	1:53.152	
7	Ruth Niño; Tatiana Muñoz	Colombia	1:55.496	
8	Mariecarmen Rivera; Melissa Reyes	Puerto Rico	2:01.956	
9	Stefanie Perdomo Vinces; Maia de Cesare Ikonicoff	Ecuador	2:05.102	
