= Canoeing at the 2011 Pan American Games – Women's K-4 500 metres =

Women's K-4 500 metres at the 2011 Pan American Games
- Venue: Canoe & Rowing Course
- Dates: October 26
- Competitors: 28 from 7 nations

Medalists
Gold medal	Kathleen Fraser; Kristin Gauthier; Alexa Irvin; Una Lounder	Canada
Silver medal	Anais Abraham; Karina Alanís; Alicia Guluarte; Maricela Montemayor	Mexico
Bronze medal	Darisleydis Amador; Yulitza Meneses; Dayexi Gandarela; Yusmary Mengana	Cuba

The women's K-4 500 metres canoeing event at the 2011 Pan American Games was held on October 26 at the Canoe & Rowing Course in Ciudad Guzman. The defending Pan American Games champion is Darisleydis Amador, Yulitza Meneses, Lianet Álvarez and Dayexi Gandarela of Cuba.

== Schedule ==
All times are local Central Daylight Time (UTC−5)

Date	Time	Round
October 26, 2011	9:00	Final

== Results ==
=== Final ===
Rank	Rowers	Country	Time	Notes
1st place, gold medalist(s)	Kathleen Fraser, Kristin Gauthier, Alexa Irvin, Una Lounder	Canada	1:37.724	
2nd place, silver medalist(s)	Anais Abraham, Karina Alanís, Alicia Guluarte, Maricela Montemayor	Mexico	1:37.799	
3rd place, bronze medalist(s)	Darisleydis Amador, Yulitza Meneses, Dayexi Gandarela, Yusmary Mengana	Cuba	1:39.105	
4	Eliana Escalona, Angélica Jimenez, Lauribel Mejias, Zulmarys Sánchez	Venezuela	1:39.599	
5	Bruna Gama, Naiane Pereira, Ariela Pinto Ana Paula Vergutz	Brazil	1:39.921	
6	Sabrina Ameghino, Maria Collueque, Maria Garro, Alexandra Keresztesi	Argentina	1:40.085	
7	Aura María Ospina, Tatiana Muñoz, Ruth Niño, Marylin Rodríguez	Colombia	1:43.441	
