= CDP Awards =

Annual sporting awards in Portugal

The CDP Awards are a series of annual sporting awards given by the Sports Confederation of Portugal (Confederação do Desporto de Portugal, CDP) to highlight sporting achievements over the preceding year. In addition to honouring athletes and coaches nominated by the national sporting federations within Portugal, awards determined in-part by public voting are also presented. There are currently five awards open to voter participation: Sportsman of the Year, Sportswoman of the Year, and Coach of the Year awards, which were introduced in 2005, and the Young Promise and Team of the Year awards, introduced in 2006 and 2007 respectively.

The awards are presented at a ceremony held at the Casino Estoril in Cascais.

== Nomination procedure ==
Contenders for the five awards subject to a public vote are first nominated by the national federation of the sport in which the athlete competes. A jury selected by the CDP then narrows down the nominees to five finalists for each award. From these finalists the winners are chosen with a weighted vote split between the public and attendees of the ceremony. In 2010, the public voting constituted 60% of the final decision with the remaining 40% determined by in-person voting of the ceremony attendees.

Federations are limited to forwarding just one candidate to be evaluated for each award; the choice of which can therefore attract media comment and criticism. In 2008 the sports newspaper Record noted the continued absence of footballer Cristiano Ronaldo from the shortlist for Sportsman of the Year, after the Portuguese Football Federation instead nominated Fernando Couto in deference to the CDP's chosen theme for 2008 of Amor à Camisola (Love of the Jersey). In 2015 the Portuguese Judo Federation caused what Record described as "perplexity in several quarters" after nominating Joana Diogo for Sportswoman of the Year over three-time winner Telma Monteiro, who had earlier that year won her fifth European title and was ranked as the highest Portuguese judoka in the world. The decision was criticised by both Diogo and her coach.

== Sportsperson of the Year ==
=== By year ===
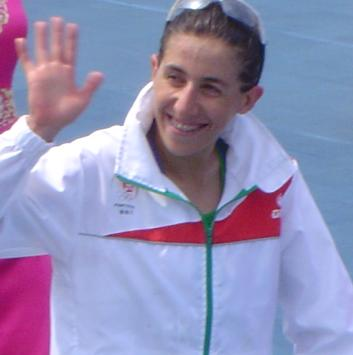
Triathlete Vanessa Fernandes (pictured in 2008) was named Sportswoman of the Year in 2006, 2007 and 2008

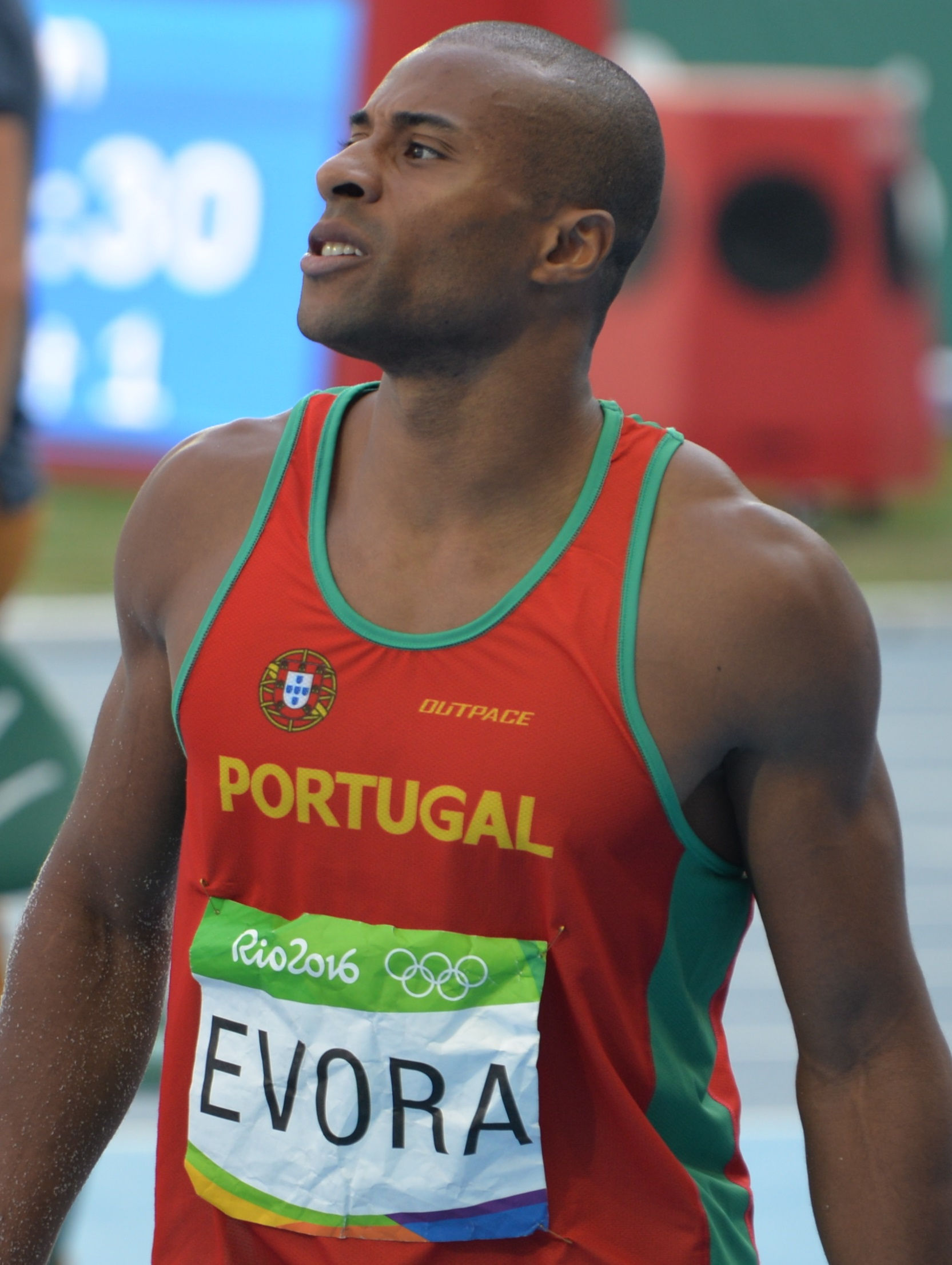
Athlete Nelson Évora (pictured in 2016) won Sportsman of the Year three consecutive times from 2007 to 2009

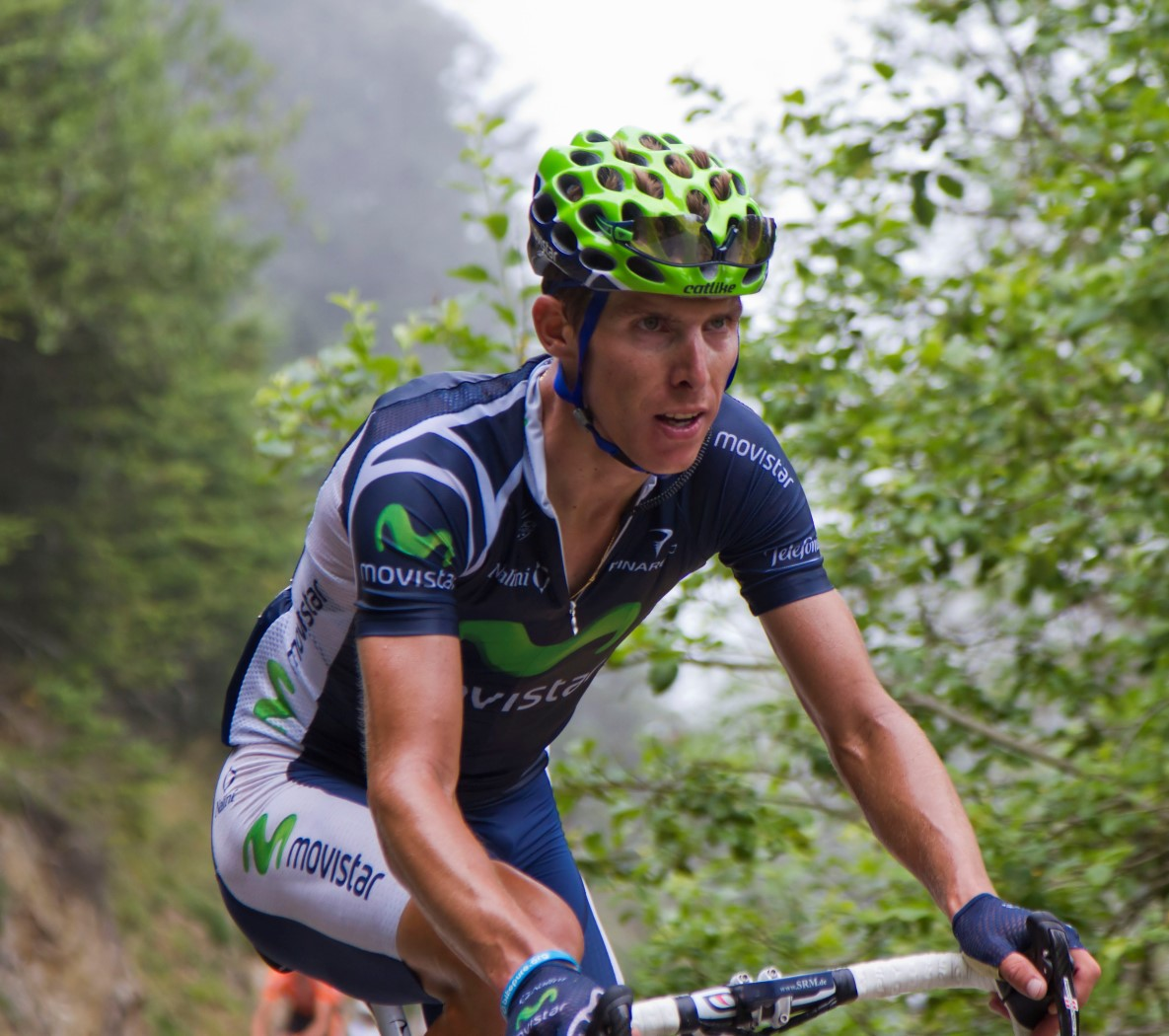
Cyclist Rui Costa (pictured in 2012) was awarded Sportsman of the Year in 2012, 2013 and 2014

Year	Sportsman of the Year		Sportswoman of the Year		Ref.
Year	Winner	Sport	Winner	Sport	Ref.
2005	José Veras	Parachuting	Diana Gomes	Swimming	
2006	Francis Obikwelu	Athletics	Vanessa Fernandes	Triathlon	
2007	Nelson Évora	Athletics	Vanessa Fernandes	Triathlon	
2008	Nelson Évora	Athletics	Vanessa Fernandes	Triathlon	
2009	Nelson Évora	Athletics	Michelle Larcher de Brito	Tennis	
2010	João Pedro Silva	Triathlon	Telma Monteiro	Judo	
2011	Hélder Rodrigues	Motor racing	Telma Monteiro	Judo	
2012	Rui Costa	Cycling	Jéssica Augusto	Athletics	
2013	Rui Costa	Cycling	Sara Moreira	Athletics	
2014	Rui Costa	Cycling	Telma Monteiro	Judo	
2015	Miguel Oliveira	Motor racing	Ana Filipa Martins	Gymnastics	
2016	Fernando Pimenta	Canoeing	Telma Monteiro	Judo	
2017	Miguel Oliveira	Motor racing	Inês Henriques	Race walking	
2018	Miguel Oliveira	Motor racing	Inês Henriques	Race walking	
2019	Jorge Fonseca	Judo	Patrícia Sampaio	Judo	
2020	Miguel Oliveira	Motor racing	Telma Monteiro	Judo	
2021	Jorge Fonseca	Judo	Patrícia Mamona	Athletics	
2022	Fernando Pimenta	Canoeing	Auriol Dongmo	Athletics	
2023	Diogo Ribeiro	Swimming	Maria Martins	Cycling	
2024	Iúri Leitão	Cycling	Patrícia Sampaio	Judo	
2025	João Almeida	Cycling	Madalena Costa	Artistic roller skating	

=== By number of wins ===
The below tables list all those who have won Sportsman or Sportswoman of the Year more than once.

Sportsman of the Year
Winner	No.	Year
Miguel Oliveira	4	2015, 2017, 2018, 2020
Nelson Évora	3	2007, 2008, 2009
Rui Costa	3	2012, 2013, 2014
Jorge Fonseca	2	2019, 2021
Fernando Pimenta	2	2016, 2022

Sportswoman of the Year
Winner	No.	Year
Telma Monteiro	5	2010, 2011, 2014, 2016, 2020
Vanessa Fernandes	3	2006, 2007, 2008
Inês Henriques	2	2017, 2018
Patrícia Sampaio	2	2019, 2024

=== By sport ===
The below table lists the total number of Sportsperson of the Year awards won by the winners' sporting profession.

Sport	No.	Athletes
Judo	9	Telma Monteiro (2010, 2011, 2014, 2016, 2020), Jorge Fonseca (2019, 2021), Patrícia Sampaio (2019, 2024)
Athletics	8	Francis Obikwelu (2006), Nelson Évora (2007, 2008, 2009), Jéssica Augusto (2012), Sara Moreira (2013), Patrícia Mamona (2021), Auriol Dongmo (2022)
Motor racing	5	Hélder Rodrigues (2011), Miguel Oliveira (2015, 2017, 2018, 2020)
Road bicycle racing	5	Rui Costa (2012, 2013, 2014), Iúri Leitão (2024), João Almeida (2025)
Triathlon	4	Vanessa Fernandes (2006, 2007, 2008), João Pedro Silva (2010)
Race walking	2	Inês Henriques (2017, 2018)
Swimming	2	Diana Gomes (2005), Diogo Ribeiro (2023)
Canoeing	2	Fernando Pimenta (2016, 2022)
Parachuting	1	José Veras (2005)
Tennis	1	Michelle Larcher de Brito (2009)
Gymnastics	1	Ana Filipa Martins (2015)

== Other main categories ==
Year	Coach of the Year		Young Promise		Team of the Year		Ref.
Year	Winner	Sport	Winner	Sport	Winner	Sport	Ref.
2005	José Peseiro	Association football	Not awarded		Not awarded		
2006	Sérgio Santos	Triathlon	João Pedro Silva	Triathlon	Not awarded		
2007	Tomaz Morais	Rugby union	João Moutinho	Association football	Portugal national rugby union team	Rugby union	
2008	João Ganço	Athletics	Miguel Arraiolos	Triathlon	Portugal national rugby sevens team	Rugby union	
2009	João Ganço	Athletics	Joana Vasconcelos	Canoe sprint	Portugal national under-23 triathlon team	Triathlon	
2010	Tomaz Morais	College sports Rugby union	Joana Vasconcelos	Canoe sprint	Portugal national under-23 canoe sprint team	Canoe sprint	
2011	Ilídio Vale	Association football	Francisca Laia	Canoe sprint	Portugal national under-20 football team	Association football	
2012	Ryszard Hoppe	Canoe sprint	Emanuel Gonçalves	Paralympic sports	1000 meter K2 team (Note: Emanuel Silva and Fernando Pimenta.)	Canoe sprint	
2013	José Poeira	Road bicycle racing	Diana Torres	Paralympic sports	500 meter K2 team (Note: Joana Vasconcelos and Beatriz Gomes.)	Canoe sprint	
2014	Pedro Rufino	Table tennis	Ivo Oliveira	Road bicycle racing	Portugal national table tennis team	Table tennis	
2015	Hélio Lucas and José Sousa	Canoe sprint	Rúben Neves	Association football	Portugal national beach soccer team	Beach soccer	
2016	Fernando Santos	Association football	Renato Sanches	Association football	Portugal national football team	Association football	
2017	Hélio Lucas	Canoe sprint	Bruno Fernandes	Association football	S.L. Benfica	Triathlon	
2018	Hélio Lucas	Canoe sprint	Mariana Machado	Athletics	Portugal national women's K2 team	Canoe sprint	
2019	Paulo Pereira	Handball	Mariana Machado	Athletics	Portugal national roller hockey team	Roller hockey	
2020	Not awarded due to the COVID-19 pandemic						
2021	Jorge Braz	Futsal	Zicky Té	Futsal	Portugal national futsal team	Futsal	
2022	Jorge Braz	Futsal	Diogo Ribeiro	Swimming	Portugal national trampoline team	Trampolining	
2023	Hélio Lucas	Canoe sprint	João Neves	Association football	Portugal women's national football team	Association football	
2024	Ruben Amorim	Association football	Francisco Costa	Handball	Iúri Leitão & Rui Oliveira	Cycling	
2025	Alípio Silva	Speed skating	Xavier Melo	Fencing	Portugal men's national handball team	Handball	

== CDP High Prestige ==
Year	Recipient
2003	Artur Agostinho
2004	Carlos Queiroz
2005	José Mourinho
2006	Rui Costa
2007	Olympic Committee of Portugal
2008	Luís Santos
2008	Vítor Baía
2008	1947 Portugal national roller hockey team
2009	Mário Moniz Pereira
2009	Kiyoshi Kobayashi
2009	Faculdade de Motricidade de Humana
2010	Carlos Lopes
2010	Rosa Mota
2011	Sporting Clube de Portugal
2011	Sport Lisboa e Benfica
2012	Fernando Correia
2012	Mário Zambujal
2012	CNID - Associação dos Jornalistas de Desporto
2012	Rádio e Televisão de Portugal
2013	Luís Santos (2)
2013	Jorge Viegas
2013	Paulo Gama
2014	Carlos Lopes (2)
2014	Museu do Desporto
2015	Jorge Gabriel
2015	Inês Gonçalves
2024	José Manuel Constantino
2024	Ginásio Clube Português
2025	Fernanda Ribeiro
