= Irina Lauric =

Romanian canoeist (born 1992)

Personal information
- Nationality: Romania
- Born: 29 December 1992 (age 33) Rădăuţi, Romania
- Height: 1.78 m (5 ft 10 in)
- Weight: 70 kg (154 lb)

Sport
- Sport: Canoeing
- Event: Sprint canoe
- Club: ASC Olympia București
- Coached by: Iuan Sipos
Medal record
World Championships
Bronze medal – third place	2013 Duisburg	K-2 1000 m
European Championships
Bronze medal – third place	2013 Montemor-o-Velho	K-2 1000 m

Irina Lauric (born December 29, 1992, in Rădăuţi) is a Romanian sprint canoeist. Lauric is a member of the canoe and kayak team for ASC Olympia București, and is coached and trained by Iuan Sipos.

Lauric represented Romania at the 2012 Summer Olympics in London, where she competed in the women's K-2 500 metres. Lauric and her partner Iuliana Paleu paddled to an eighth-place finish and sixteenth overall in the B-final by 0.19 seconds, behind the Russian pair Natalia Lobova and Vera Sobetova, posting their time of 1:52.468.
