= Vera Sobetova =

Russian canoeist (born 1992)

Personal information
- Full name: Vera Valeryevna Sobetova
- Nationality: Russia
- Born: 10 March 1992 (age 34) Lipetsk, Russia
- Height: 1.75 m (5 ft 9 in)
- Weight: 65 kg (143 lb)

Sport
- Sport: Canoeing
- Event: Sprint canoe
Medal record
European Championships
Silver medal – second place	2018 Belgrade	K-2 200 m
Bronze medal – third place	2014 Brandenburg	K-4 500 m
Bronze medal – third place	2018 Belgrade	K-4 500 m

Vera Valeryevna Sobetova (Russian: Вера Валерьевна Собетова; born 10 March 1992) is a Russian sprint canoeist. Sobetova represented Russia at the 2012 Summer Olympics in London, where she competed in sprint kayak doubles and four. For her first event, the women's K-4 500 metres, Sobetova and her teammates Yuliana Salakhova, Natalia Podolskaya, and Yulia Kachalova finished seventh in the final by six thousandths of a second (0.006) behind the Portuguese team (led by Teresa Portela), with a time of 1:33.459. The following day, Sobetova and her partner Natalia Lobova paddled to a seventh-place finish and fifteenth overall in the B-final of the women's K-2 500 metres, by nineteen hundredths of a second (0.19) ahead of the Romanian pair Irina Lauric and Iuliana Paleu, posting their time of 1:52.277.
