= Darisleydis Amador =

Cuban canoeist (born 1988)

Personal information
- Full name: Darisleydis Amador Rodríguez
- Nationality: Cuba
- Born: 1 January 1988 (age 38) Matanzas, Cuba

Sport
- Sport: Canoeing
- Event: Sprint canoe
Medal record
Women's canoe sprint
Representing Cuba
Pan American Games
Silver medal – second place	2011 Guadalajara	K-1 200 m
Bronze medal – third place	2011 Guadalajara	K-4 500 m

Darisleydis Amador Rodríguez (born January 1, 1988, in Matanzas) is a Cuban sprint canoeist. She won a silver medal in the women's K-1 200 metres at the 2011 Pan American Games in Guadalajara, Mexico by thirty-seven thousandths of a second (0.037) behind winner Carrie Johnson of the United States, with a time of 41.840 seconds.

Amador represented Cuba at the 2012 Summer Olympics in London, where she competed only in two individual sprint kayak events. For her first event, the women's K-1 500 metres, Amador paddled to a seventh-place finish in the semi-final rounds, but fell short in her bid for the final by approximately four seconds behind Canada's Émilie Fournel, with a time of 1:58.762. In the first ever women's K-1 200 metres, Amador finished fourth and twelfth overall in the B-final by twenty-five thousandths of a second (0.025) behind Serbia's Nikolina Moldovan, attaining her best Olympic time of 45.099 seconds.
