= Canoeing at the 2012 Summer Olympics – Women's K-1 500 metres =

Women's canoe sprint K-1 500 metres at the Games of the XXX Olympiad
- Venue: Eton Dorney
- Date: 7 to 9 August
- Competitors: 25 from 25 nations
- Winning time: 1:51.456

Medalists
| 1st place, gold medalist(s) | | Danuta Kozák | Hungary |
| 2nd place, silver medalist(s) | | Inna Osypenko | Ukraine |
| 3rd place, bronze medalist(s) | | Bridgette Hartley | South Africa |

The women's canoe sprint K-1 500 metres at the 2012 Olympic Games in London took place between 7 and 9 August at Eton Dorney.

Danuta Kozák from Hungary won the gold medal. Inna Osypenko from Ukraine won silver and South Africa's Bridgette Hartley took bronze.

== Competition format ==
The competition comprised heats, semi-finals and a final round.

== Schedule ==
All times are British Summer Time (UTC+01:00)

| Date | Time | Round |
|---|---|---|
| Tuesday 7 August 2012 | 10:07; 11:16 | Heats; Semi-finals |
| Thursday 9 August 2012 | 10:08 | Finals |

== Results ==
=== Heats ===
The fastest six boats in each heat qualified for the semi-finals.

==== Heat 1 ====
| Rank | Canoer | Country | Time | Notes |
|---|---|---|---|---|
| 1 | Anne Rikala | Finland | 1:52.641 | Q |
| 2 | Henriette Hansen | Denmark | 1:52.650 | Q |
| 3 | Katrin Wagner-Augustin | Germany | 1:53.438 | Q |
| 4 | Carrie Johnson | United States | 1:53.983 | Q |
| 5 | Darisleydis Amador | Cuba | 1:56.038 | Q |
| 6 | Teneale Hatton | New Zealand | 1:56.741 | Q |
| 7 | Arezoo Hakimi | Iran | 1:58.598 | |

==== Heat 2 ====
| Rank | Canoer | Country | Time | Notes |
|---|---|---|---|---|
| 1 | Danuta Kozák | Hungary | 1:52.828 | Q |
| 2 | Bridgette Hartley | South Africa | 1:53.051 | Q |
| 3 | Josefa Idem | Italy | 1:55.619 | Q |
| 4 | Yuliana Salakhova | Russia | 1:56.621 | Q |
| 5 | Émilie Fournel | Canada | 1:58.740 | Q |
| 6 | Marharyta Tsishkevich | Belarus | 2:01.216 | Q |

==== Heat 3 ====
| Rank | Canoer | Country | Time | Notes |
|---|---|---|---|---|
| 1 | Sofia Paldanius | Sweden | 1:51.212 | Q |
| 2 | Teresa Portela | Portugal | 1:51.887 | Q |
| 3 | Aneta Konieczna | Poland | 1:52.069 | Q |
| 4 | Inna Osypenko | Ukraine | 1:52.268 | Q |
| 5 | Mira Verås Larsen | Norway | 1:55.923 | Q |
| 6 | Yulia Borzova | Uzbekistan | 2:03.893 | Q |

==== Heat 4 ====
| Rank | Canoer | Country | Time | Notes |
|---|---|---|---|---|
| 1 | Rachel Cawthorn | Great Britain | 1:53.491 | Q |
| 2 | Alana Nicholls | Australia | 1:53.823 | Q |
| 3 | Natalya Sergeyeva | Kazakhstan | 1:54.445 | Q |
| 4 | Geraldine Lee Wei Ling | Singapore | 2:01.037 | Q |
| 5 | Špela Ponomarenko Janić | Slovenia | 2:01.520 | Q |
| 6 | Afef Ben Ismail | Tunisia | 2:07.705 | Q |

=== Semifinals ===
The first two canoeists in each semi-final and the two fastest third placed boats qualified for the 'A' final. The fourth and fifth ranked canoeists in each semi-final and the two fastest sixth placed boats qualified for the 'B' final.

==== Semifinal 1 ====
| Rank | Canoer | Country | Time | Notes |
|---|---|---|---|---|
| 1 | Bridgette Hartley | South Africa | 1:51.286 | Q |
| 2 | Inna Osypenko | Ukraine | 1:51.515 | Q |
| 3 | Anne Rikala | Finland | 1:51.852 | q |
| 4 | Aneta Konieczna | Poland | 1:52.193 | |
| 5 | Alana Nicholls | Australia | 1:52.224 | |
| 6 | Émilie Fournel | Canada | 1:54.120 | |
| 7 | Darisleydis Amador | Cuba | 1:58.762 | |
| 8 | Afef Ben Ismail | Tunisia | 2:15.362 | |

==== Semifinal 2 ====
| Rank | Canoer | Country | Time | Notes |
|---|---|---|---|---|
| 1 | Danuta Kozák | Hungary | 1:50.469 | Q |
| 2 | Henriette Hansen | Denmark | 1:51.929 | Q |
| 3 | Sofia Paldanius | Sweden | 1:51.945 | q |
| 4 | Natalya Sergeyeva | Kazakhstan | 1:53.888 | |
| 5 | Teneale Hatton | New Zealand | 1:54.504 | |
| 6 | Mira Verås Larsen | Norway | 1:57.354 | |
| 7 | Geraldine Lee Wei Ling | Singapore | 2:01.516 | |
| – | Marharyta Tsishkevich | Belarus | | DSQ |

==== Semifinal 3 ====
| Rank | Canoer | Country | Time | Notes |
|---|---|---|---|---|
| 1 | Josefa Idem | Italy | 1:52.232 | Q |
| 2 | Rachel Cawthorn | Great Britain | 1:52.542 | Q |
| 3 | Teresa Portela | Portugal | 1:53.064 | |
| 4 | Katrin Wagner-Augustin | Germany | 1:53.241 | |
| 5 | Špela Ponomarenko Janić | Slovenia | 1:53.341 | |
| 6 | Carrie Johnson | United States | 1:54.628 | |
| 7 | Yuliana Salakhova | Russia | 1:57.761 | |
| 8 | Yulia Borzova | Uzbekistan | 2:00.584 | |

=== Finals ===
==== Final B ====
| Rank | Canoer | Country | Time | Notes |
|---|---|---|---|---|
| 1 | Katrin Wagner-Augustin | Germany | 1:52.402 | |
| 2 | Aneta Konieczna | Poland | 1:53.356 | |
| 3 | Teresa Portela | Portugal | 1:53.597 | |
| 4 | Špela Ponomarenko | Slovenia | 1:53.718 | |
| 5 | Natalya Sergeyeva | Kazakhstan | 1:54.707 | |
| 6 | Émilie Fournel | Canada | 1:56.058 | |
| 7 | Teneale Hatton | New Zealand | 1:56.103 | |
| 8 | Alana Nicholls | Australia | 1:59.033 | |

==== Final A ====
| Rank | Canoer | Country | Time | Notes |
|---|---|---|---|---|
| 1st place, gold medalist(s) | Danuta Kozák | Hungary | 1:51.456 | |
| 2nd place, silver medalist(s) | Inna Osypenko | Ukraine | 1:52.685 | |
| 3rd place, bronze medalist(s) | Bridgette Hartley | South Africa | 1:52.923 | |
| 4 | Sofia Paldanius | Sweden | 1:53.197 | |
| 5 | Josefa Idem | Italy | 1:53.223 | |
| 6 | Rachel Cawthorn | Great Britain | 1:53.345 | |
| 7 | Henriette Hansen | Denmark | 1:54.110 | |
| 8 | Anne Rikala | Finland | 1:54.333 | |
