= Iuliana Paleu =

Romanian canoeist

Personal information
- Nationality: Romania
- Born: 30 September 1990 (age 35) Bicaz, Neamț, Romania
- Height: 1.65 m (5 ft 5 in)
- Weight: 61 kg (134 lb)

Sport
- Sport: Canoeing
- Event: Sprint canoe
- Club: CS Dinamo București
- Coached by: Iuan Sipos

Iuliana Paleu (born September 30, 1990, in Bicaz, Neamț) is a Romanian sprint canoeist. Paleu is a member of the canoe and kayak team for CS Dinamo București, and is coached and trained by Iuan Sipos.

Paleu represented Romania at the 2012 Summer Olympics in London, where she competed in the women's K-2 500 metres. Paleu and her partner Irina Lauric paddled to an eighth-place finish and sixteenth overall in the B-final. They were nineteen hundredths of a second (0.19) behind the Russian pair of Natalia Lobova and Vera Sobetova, who posted a time of 1:52.468.
