= Dayexi Gandarela =

Cuban canoeist (born 1986)

Personal information
- Full name: Dayexi Gandarela Sosa
- Nickname: La Gallega
- Nationality: Cuba
- Born: 4 July 1986 (age 40) Caibarién, Cuba

Sport
- Sport: Canoeing
- Event: Sprint canoe
- Coached by: Darovy Acevedo
Medal record
Women's canoe sprint
Representing Cuba
Pan American Games
Gold medal – first place	2011 Guadalajara	K-2 500 m
Bronze medal – third place	2011 Guadalajara	K-4 500 m

Dayexi Gandarela Sosa (born 4 July 1986) is a Cuban sprint canoeist. She edged out the Argentine pair (led by Alexandra Keresztesi) by two thirds of a second (0.67) for the gold medal in the women's K-2 500 metres at the 2011 Pan American Games in Guadalajara, Mexico.

Gandarela represented Cuba at the 2012 Summer Olympics in London, where she competed in the women's K-2 500 metres. Gandarela and her partner Yulitza Meneses paddled to a sixth-place finish and fourteenth overall in the B-final by approximately three seconds behind the Slovak pair (Ivana Kmeťová and Martina Kohlová), posting their time of 1:50.124.
