= Jana Blahová =

Czech sprint canoer

Medal record

Women's canoe sprint

World Championships
Silver medal – second place	2006 Szeged	K-2 500 m

Jana Blahová (born 22 November 1984) is a Czech sprint canoer who has competed since the mid-2000s. She won a silver medal in the K-2 500 m event at the 2006 ICF Canoe Sprint World Championships in Szeged.

Blahová also finished eighth in the K-2 500 m event at the 2008 Summer Olympics in Beijing.
