= Tiffany Kruger =

South African canoeist (born 1987)

Personal information
- Nationality: South Africa
- Born: 18 July 1987 (age 39) Durban, South Africa
- Height: 1.78 m (5 ft 10 in)
- Weight: 65 kg (143 lb)

Sport
- Sport: Canoeing
- Event: Sprint canoe
- Club: Natal Canoe Club
- Coached by: Attila Adrovicz

Tiffany Kruger (born July 18, 1987 in Durban) is a South African sprint canoeist. Kruger is a member of Natal Canoe Club in Pietermaritzburg, and is coached and trained by former Olympic silver medalist Attila Adrovicz of Hungary (1992).

Kruger represented South Africa at the 2012 Summer Olympics in London, where she competed in the first ever women's K-1 200 metres. She paddled in the third heat against six other canoeists, including former Olympic champion Inna Osypenko of Ukraine. Kruger, however, failed to advance into the semi-finals, as she finished seventh in her heat by nearly three seconds behind Slovakia's Ivana Kmeťová, with a time of 46.122 seconds.
