= Yvonne Schuring =

Austrian canoeist (born 1978)

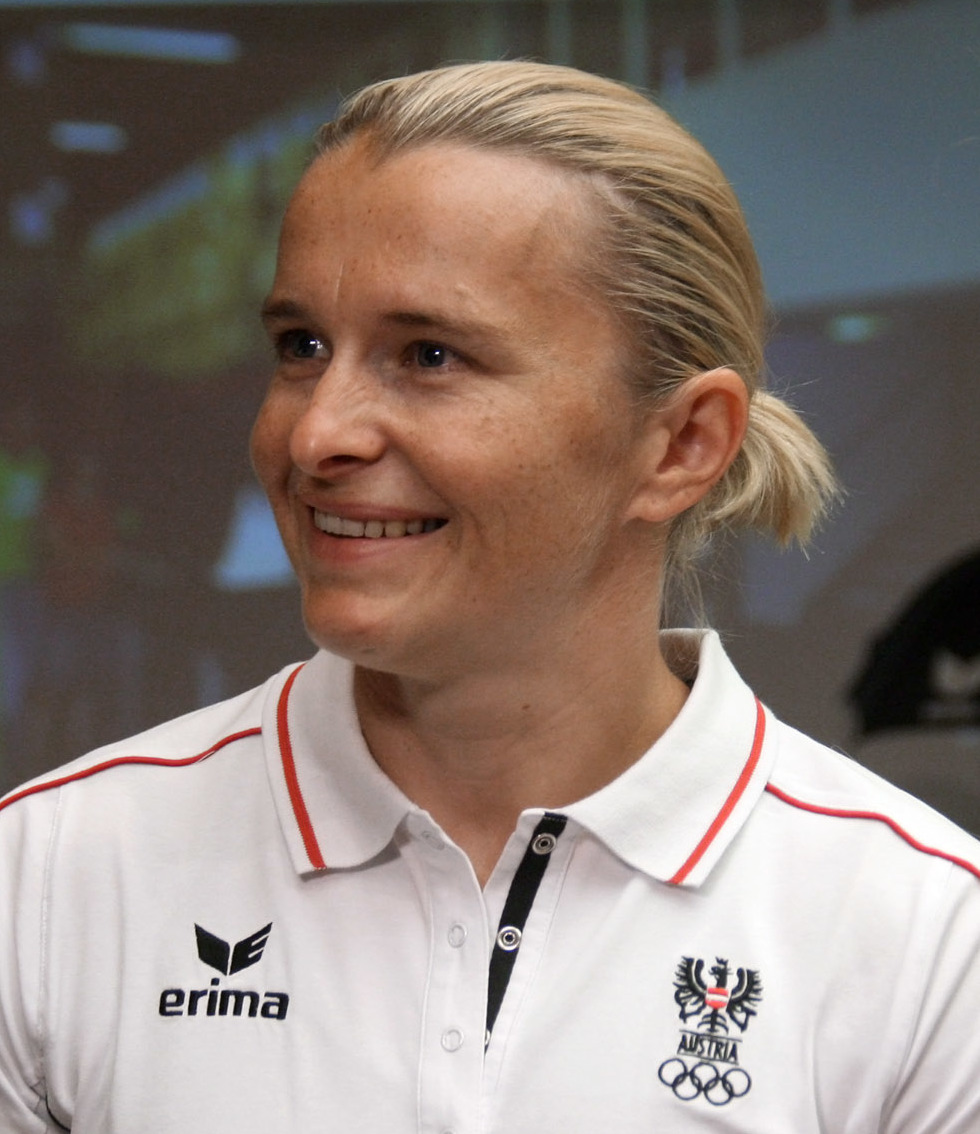
- Schuring in 2012

Personal information
- Born: 4 January 1978 (age 48) Wolfen, East Germany
Medal record
Women's canoe sprint
Representing Austria
World Championships
Gold medal – first place	2011 Szeged	K-2 500 m
Bronze medal – third place	2010 Poznań	K-2 500 m

Yvonne Schuring (born 4 January 1978 in Wolfen, East Germany) is an Austrian sprint canoer who competed in the late 2000s. Together with teammate Viktoria Schwarz, she competed in the K-2 500m event and they had the following notable results:

- Gold medal at the 2011 World Championships .
- Bronze medal in at the 2010 ICF Canoe Sprint World Championships in Poznań.
- 9th place in the K-2 500 m at the 2008 Summer Olympics in Beijing,
- 5th place in the same event at the 2012 Summer Olympics in London.

In June 2015, she won a silver medal in the inaugural European Games, for Austria in Women's K-1 500m canoe sprint.
