= Marie Delattre =

French sprint canoer

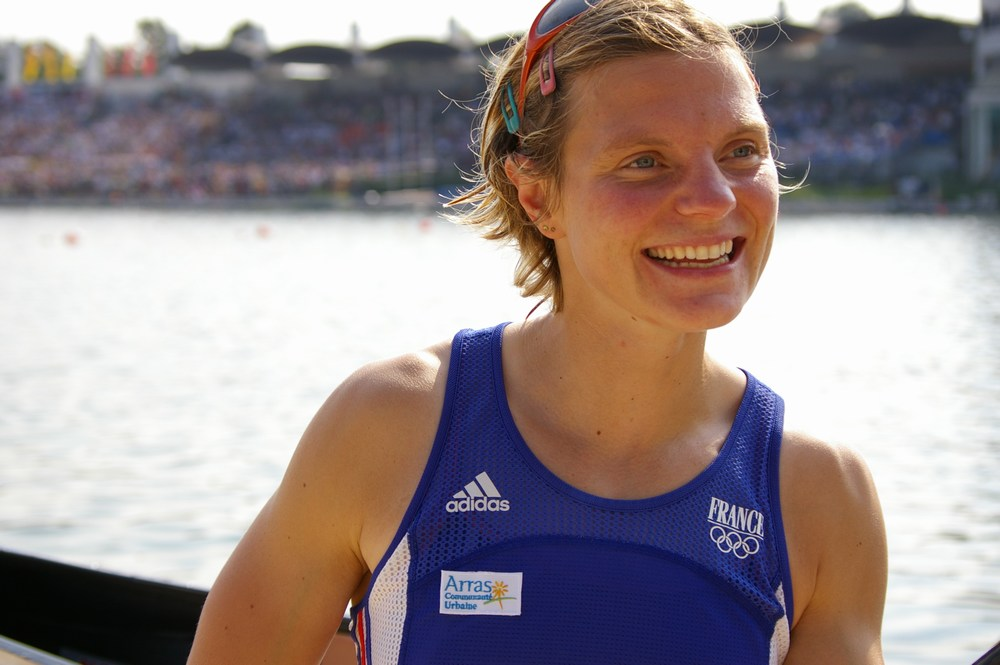
- Marie Delattre

Medal record

Women's canoe sprint

Olympic Games
| Bronze medal – third place | 2008 Beijing | K-2 500 m |

World Championships
| Bronze medal – third place | 2005 Zagreb | K-2 500 m |
| Bronze medal – third place | 2007 Duisburg | K-2 500 m |

Mediterranean Games
| Bronze medal – third place | 2005 Almería | K-1 1000 m |

Marie Delattre (born 4 March 1981 in Arras) is a French sprint canoeist.

== Career ==
Delattre has competed since the mid-2000s. Competing in three Summer Olympics, she won a bronze medal in the K-2 500 m event at Beijing in 2008 with Anne-Laure Viard.

Delattre also won two bronze medals in the K-2 500 m event at the ICF Canoe Sprint World Championships, earning them in 2005 and 2007 also with Viard.

== Gallery ==
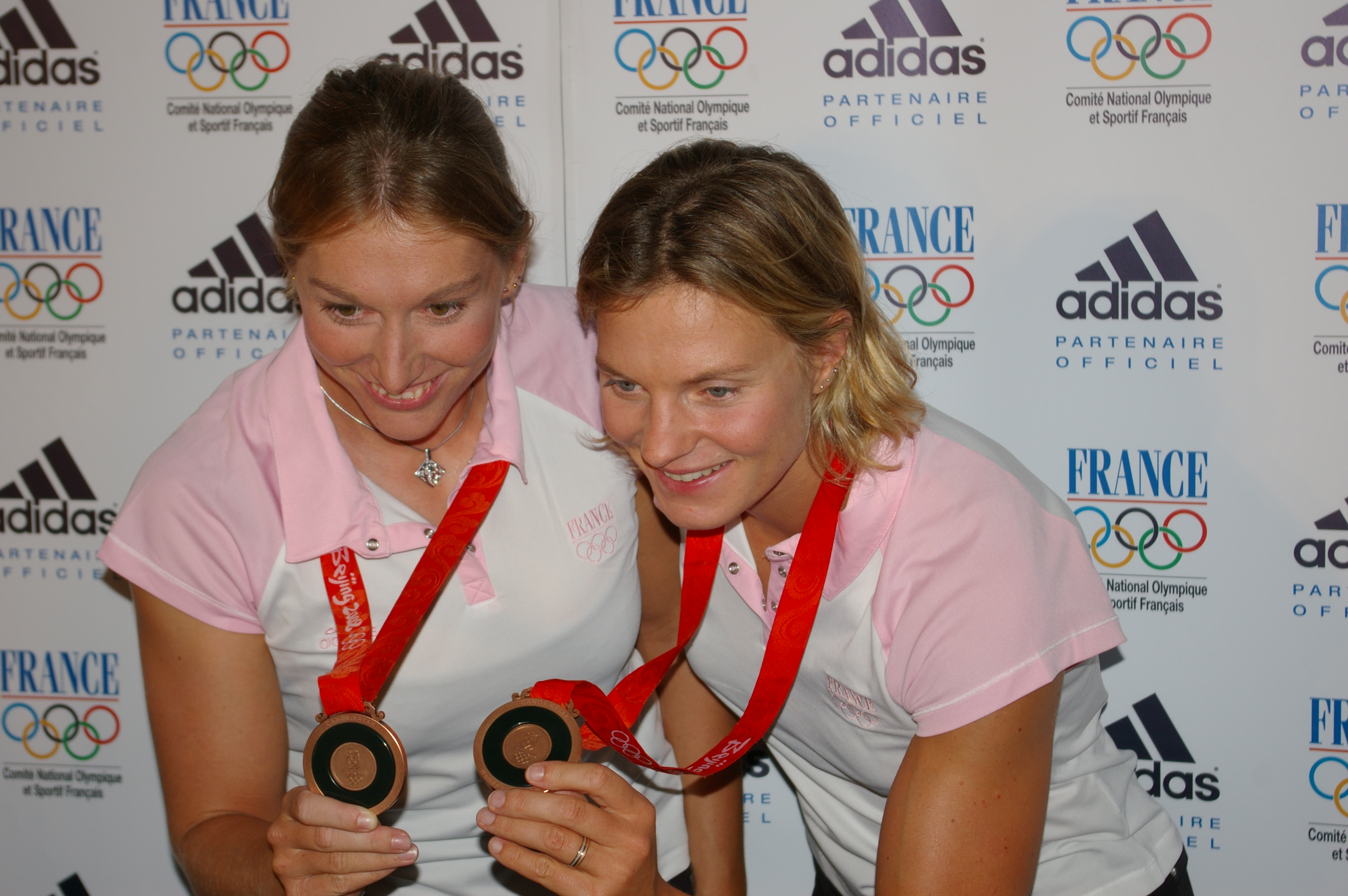
Marie Delattre and Anne-Laure Viard in Club France on the evening after their bronze medal (Beijing 2008)

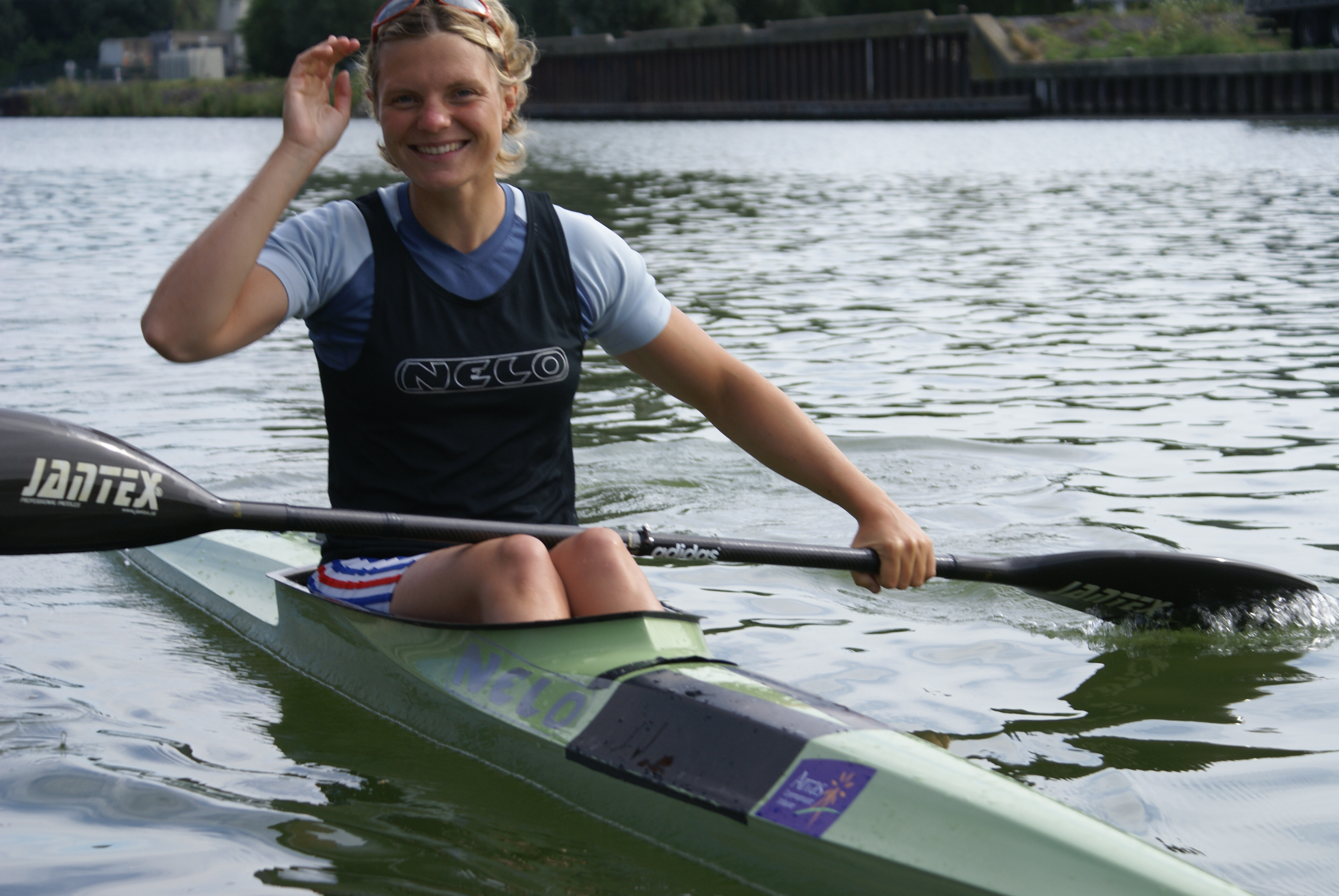
Marie Delattre

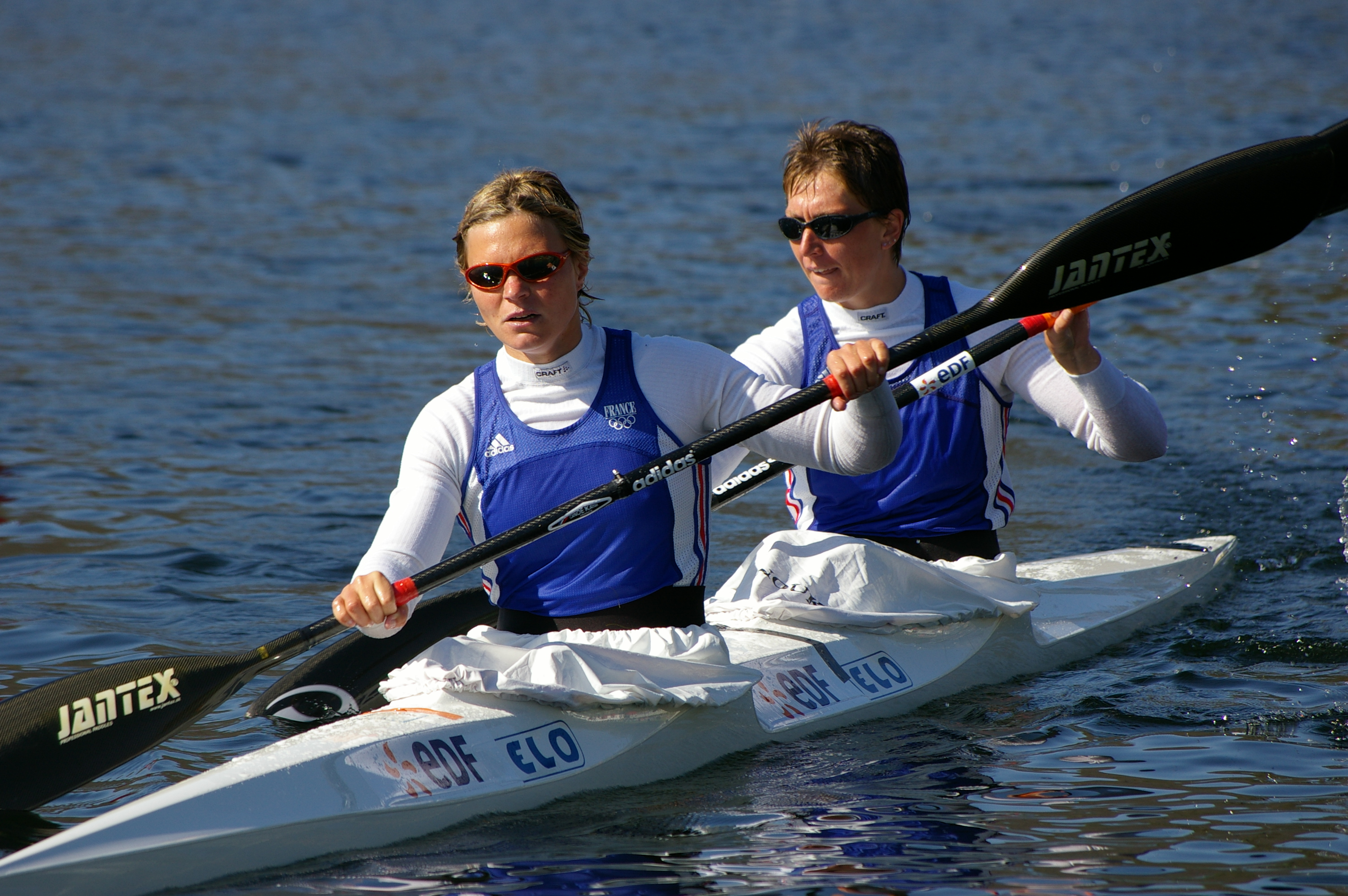
Marie Delattre and Anne-Laure Viard

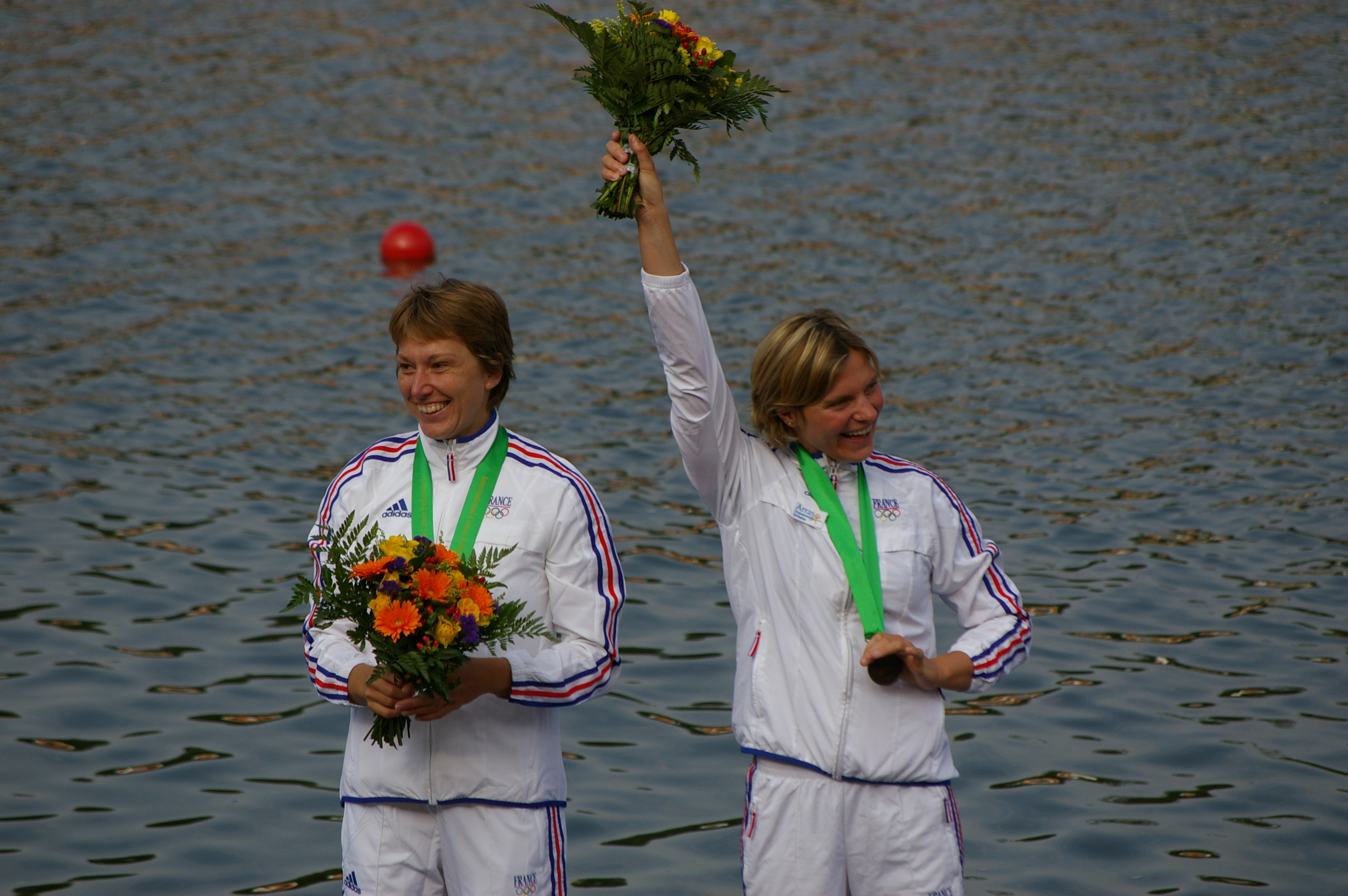
Marie Delattre and Anne-Laure Viard at the medal award ceremony of the 2007 championships in Duisburg.
