= Beatriz Gomes =

Portuguese canoeist

Medal record

Women's canoe sprint

World Championships
Bronze medal – third place	2009 Dartmouth	K-4 200 m

European Championships
Bronze medal – third place	2012 Zagreb	K-2 200 m

Women's canoe marathon

World Championships
Gold medal – first place	2009 Gala	K-1
Silver medal – second place	2004 Bergen	K-1
Bronze medal – third place	2006 Tremolat	K-1

Beatriz Gomes (born 31 December 1979) is a Portuguese sprint canoer and marathon canoeist who has competed since the late first decade of the 21st century. She won a bronze medal in the K-4 200 m event at the 2009 ICF Canoe Sprint World Championships in Dartmouth. She was World Champion in the K1 Marathon event in 2009.

Gomes also competed in the K-2 500 m event at the 2008 Summer Olympics in Beijing, but was eliminated in the semifinals.

At the 2012 Summer Olympics, Gomes and her teammate Joana Vasconcelos reached the final of K-2 500 m, as did Gomes and the Portuguese K-4 500 m team.

Awards
Preceded by 1000 meter K2 team (Emanuel Silva and Fernando Pimenta)	Portuguese Team of the Year; 2013 (500 meter K2 team with Joana Vasconcelos)	Succeeded by Portugal national table tennis team
