= Canoeing at the 2008 Summer Olympics – Women's K-2 500 metres =

The women's K-2 500 metres competition in canoeing at the 2008 Summer Olympics took place at the Shunyi Olympic Rowing-Canoeing Park in Beijing. The K-2 event is raced in two-person kayaks.

Competition consists of three rounds: the heats, the semifinals, and the final. All boats compete in the heats. The top three finishers in each of the two heats advances directly to the final, while the remaining top nine finishers in both heats move on to the semifinal. The top three finishers in the semifinals join the heats winners in the final.

Heats took place on August 19, the semifinal took place on August 21, and the final was on August 23.

== Schedule ==
All times are China Standard Time (UTC+8)

Date	Time	Round
Tuesday, August 19, 2008	17:50-18:10	Heats
Thursday, August 21, 2008	17:00-17:10	Semifinal
Saturday, August 23, 2008	17:20-17:35	Final

== Medalists ==
Gold	Silver	Bronze
Katalin Kovács and Natasa Janics (HUN)	Beata Mikołajczyk and Aneta Konieczna (POL)	Marie Delattre and Anne-Laure Viard (FRA)

== Results ==
=== Heats ===
Qualification Rules: 1..3->Final, 4..7->Semifinal + 8th best time, Rest Out

==== Heat 1 ====
Rank	Athletes	Country	Time	Notes
1	Fanny Fischer, Nicole Reinhardt	Germany	1:43.412	QF
2	Beata Mikołajczyk, Aneta Konieczna	Poland	1:44.631	QF
3	Michaela Mrůzková, Jana Blahová	Czech Republic	1:45.104	QF
4	Anne Rikala, Jenni Mikkonen	Finland	1:45.735	QS
5	Beatriz Manchon, Sonia Molanes	Spain	1:46.646	QS
6	Shinobu Kitamoto, Mikiko Takeya	Japan	1:46.980	QS
7	Ivana Kmetová, Martina Koholova	Slovakia	1:47.284	QS
8	Michele Eray, Bridgette Hartley	South Africa	1:47.341	QS
9	Jessica Walker, Anna Hemmings	Great Britain	1:47.435	

==== Heat 2 ====
Rank	Athletes	Country	Time	Notes
1	Katalin Kovács, Nataša Janić	Hungary	1:42.162	QF
2	Marie Delattre, Anne-Laure Viard	France	1:43.832	QF
3	Hannah Davis, Lyndsie Fogarty	Australia	1:45.124	QF
4	Kristin Ann Gauthier, Mylanie Barre	Canada	1:46.129	QS
5	Yvonne Schuring, Viktoria Schwarz	Austria	1:46.980	QS
6	Stefania Cicali, Fabiana Sgroi	Italy	1:47.018	QS
7	Beatriz Gomes, Helena Rodrigues	Portugal	1:47.588	QS
8	Xu Linbei, Wang Feng	China	1:47.645	

=== Semifinal ===
Qualification Rules: 1..3->Final, Rest Out

Rank	Athletes	Country	Time	Notes
1	Shinobu Kitamoto, Mikiko Takeya	Japan	1:43.541	QF
2	Anne Rikala, Jenni Mikkonen	Finland	1:44.624	QF
3	Yvonne Schuring, Viktoria Schwarz	Austria	1:44.834	QF
4	Beatriz Manchon, Sonia Molanes	Spain	1:45.313	
5	Beatriz Gomes, Helena Rodrigues	Portugal	1:46.021	
6	Stefania Cicali, Fabiana Sgroi	Italy	1:46.163	
7	Ivana Kmetová, Martina Koholova	Slovakia	1:46.380	
8	Michele Eray, Bridgette Hartley	South Africa	1:47.018	
9	Kristin Ann Gauthier, Mylanie Barre	Canada	1:47.510	

=== Final ===
Rank	Athletes	Country	Time	Notes
Gold medal	Katalin Kovács, Nataša Janić	Hungary	1:41.308	
Silver medal	Beata Mikołajczyk, Aneta Konieczna	Poland	1:42.092	
Bronze medal	Marie Delattre, Anne-Laure Viard	France	1:42.128	
4	Fanny Fischer, Nicole Reinhardt	Germany	1:42.899	
5	Shinobu Kitamoto, Mikiko Takeya	Japan	1:43.291	
6	Hannah Davis, Lyndsie Fogarty	Australia	1:43.969	
7	Anne Rikala, Jenni Mikkonen	Finland	1:44.176	
8	Michaela Mrůzková, Jana Blahová	Czech Republic	1:44.870	
9	Yvonne Schuring, Viktoria Schwarz	Austria	1:44.965	
