= Yulitza Meneses =

Cuban canoeist (born 1985)

Personal information
- Full name: Yulitza Meneses Prieto
- Nationality: Cuba
- Born: 9 November 1985 (age 40) Nueva Gerona, Cuba

Sport
- Sport: Canoeing
- Event: Sprint canoe
Medal record
Women's canoe sprint
Representing Cuba
Pan American Games
Gold medal – first place	2011 Guadalajara	K-2 500 m
Bronze medal – third place	2011 Guadalajara	K-4 500 m

Yulitza Meneses Prieto (born November 9, 1985, in Nueva Gerona) is a Cuban sprint canoeist.

== Biography and career ==
She edged out the Argentine pair (led by Alexandra Keresztesi) by two thirds of a second (0.67) for the gold medal in the women's K-2 500 metres at the 2011 Pan American Games in Guadalajara, Mexico.

Meneses represented Cuba at the 2012 Summer Olympics in London, where she competed in the women's K-2 500 metres. Meneses and her partner Dayexi Gandarela paddled to a sixth-place finish and fourteenth overall in the B-final by approximately three seconds behind the Slovakian pair (Ivana Kmeťová and Martina Kohlová), posting their time of 1:50.124.
