= Anne-Laure Viard =

French sprint canoer (born 1981)

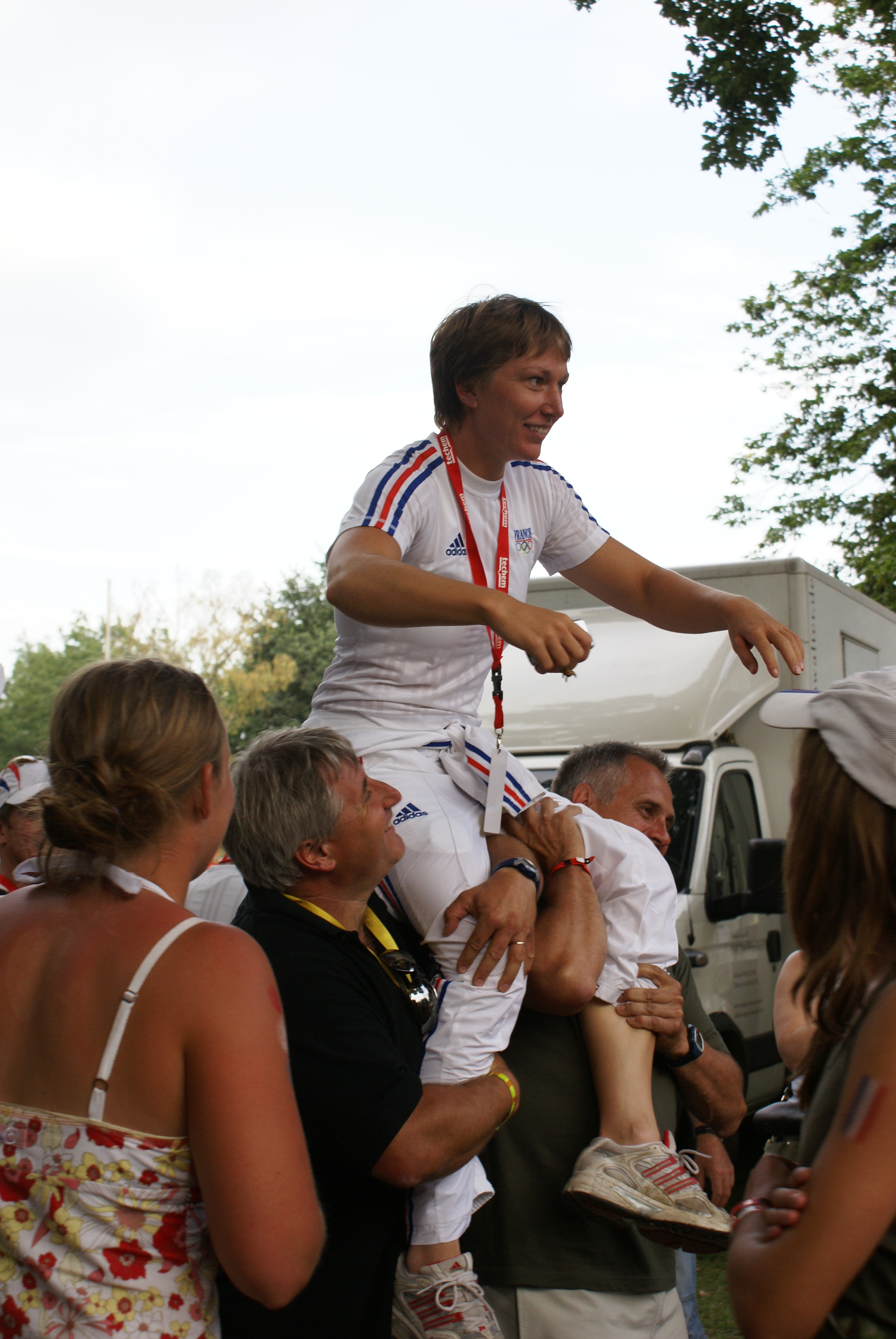
- Anne-Laure Viard

Medal record

Women's canoe sprint

Olympic Games
Bronze medal – third place	2008 Beijing	K-2 500 m

World Championships
Bronze medal – third place	2005 Zagreb	K-2 500 m
Bronze medal – third place	2007 Duisburg	K-2 500 m
Bronze medal – third place	2009 Dartmouth	K-1 200 m

Anne-Laure Viard (born 7 June 1981) is a French sprint canoeist who has competed since the mid-2000s. Competing in two Summer Olympics, she won a bronze medal in the K-2 500 m event at Beijing in 2008.

Viard also won three bronze medals at the ICF Canoe Sprint World Championships (K-1 200 m: 2009, K-2 500 m: 2005, 2007).

She is competing with partner Marie Delattre.

== Gallery ==
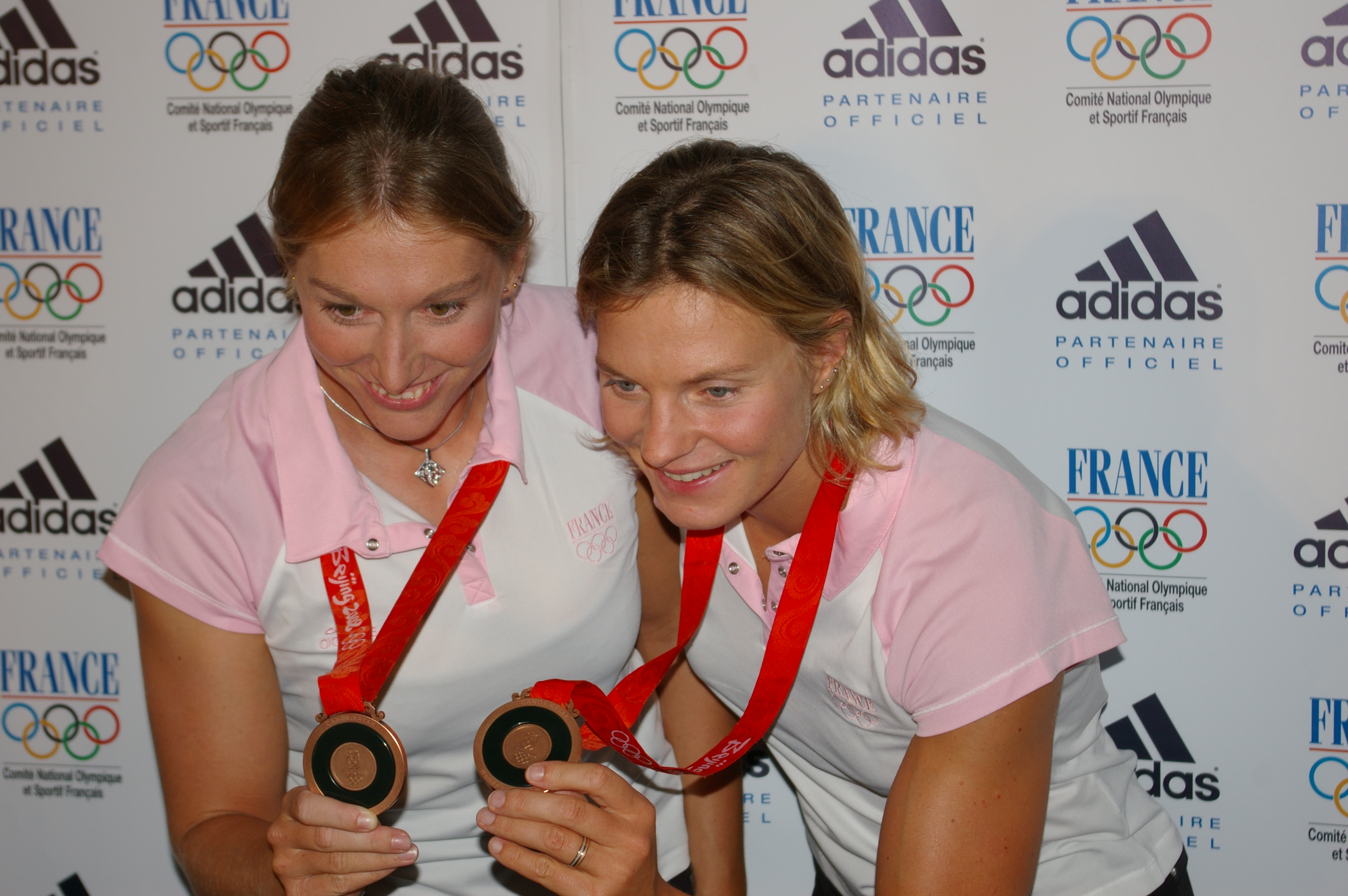
Marie Delattre and Anne-Laure Viard in Club France on the evening after their bronze medal (Beijing 2008)

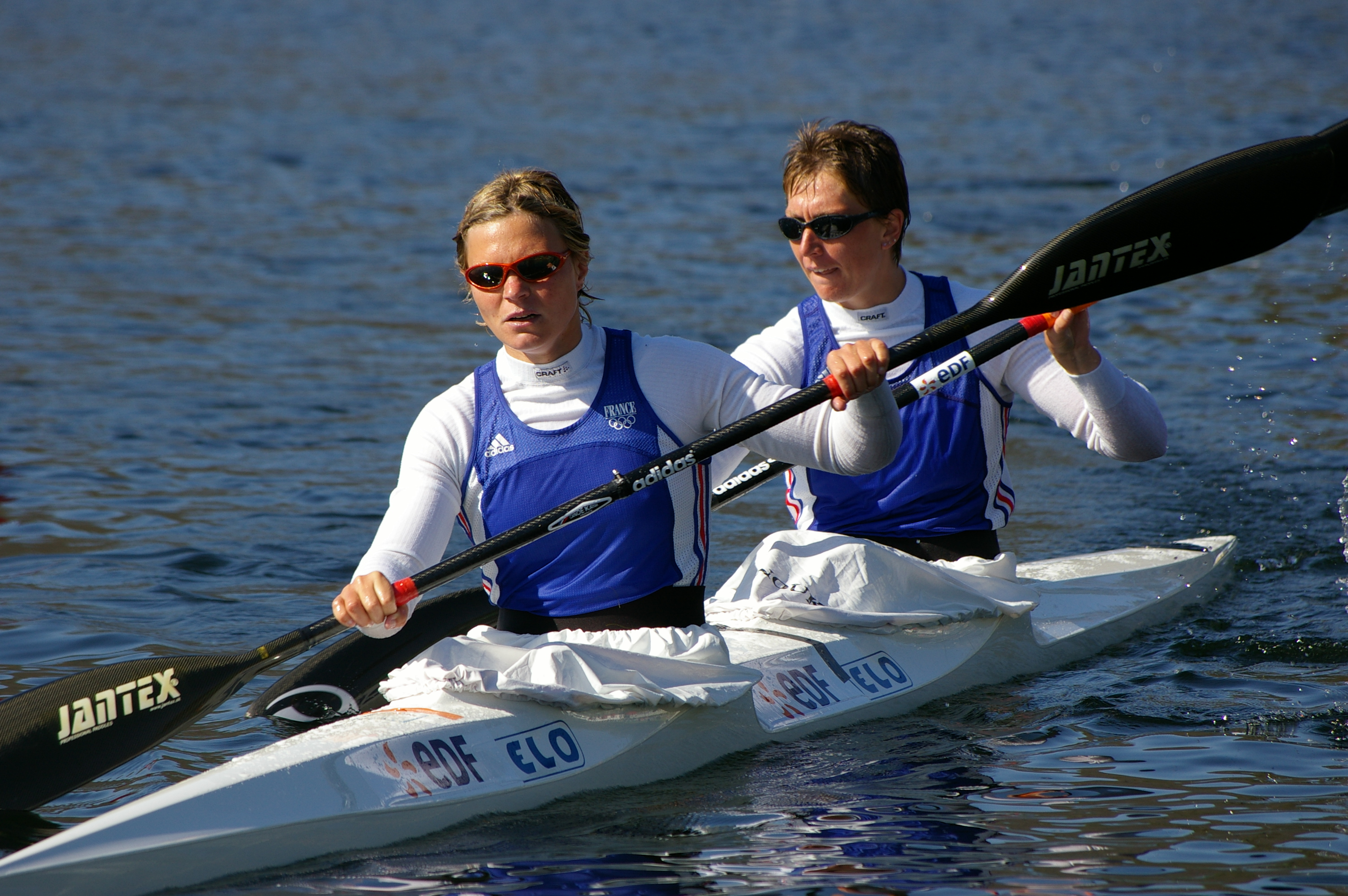
Marie Delattre and Anne-Laure Viard

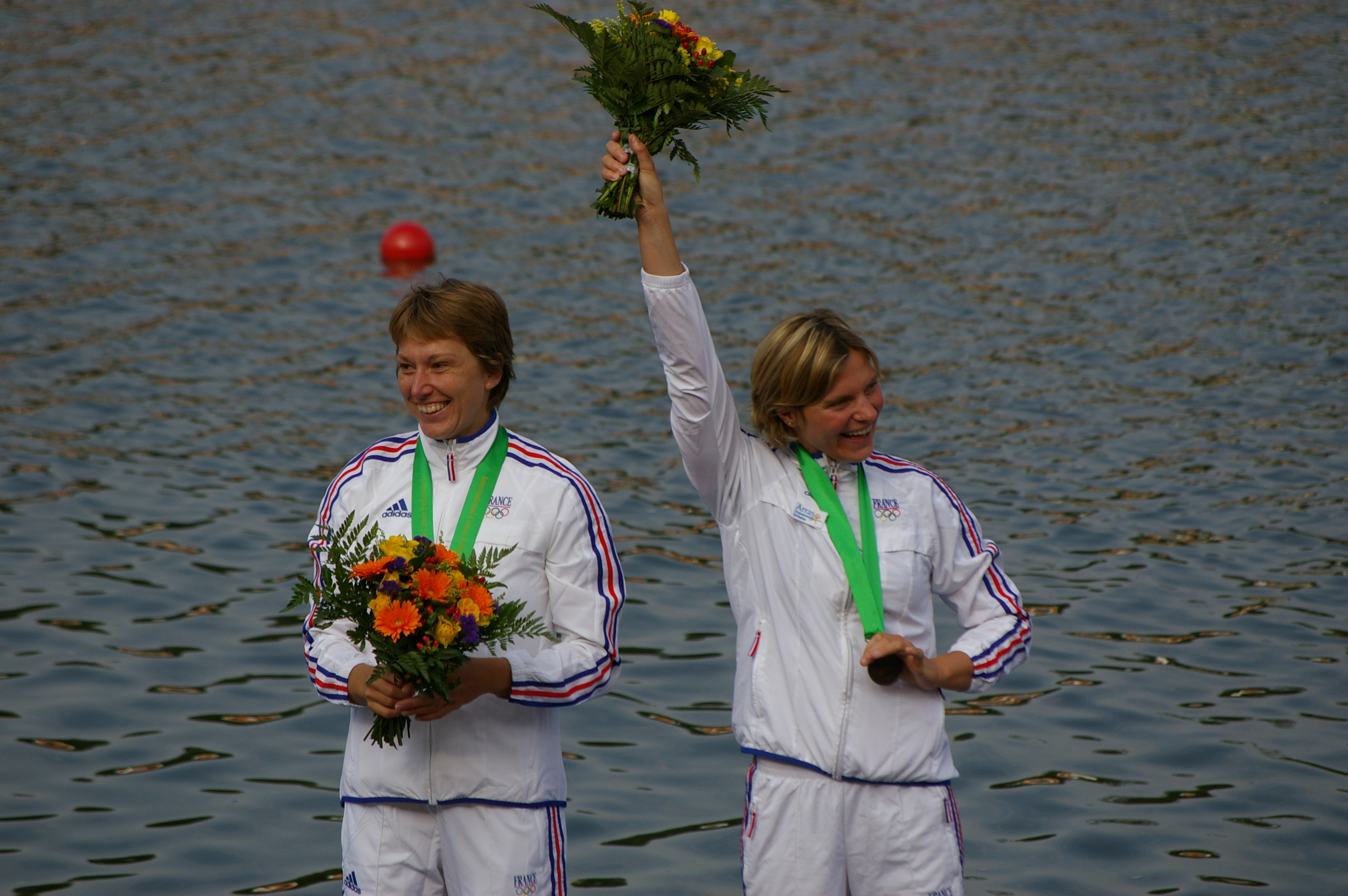
Marie Delattre and Anne-Laure Viard at the medal award ceremony of the 2007 championships in Duisburg.

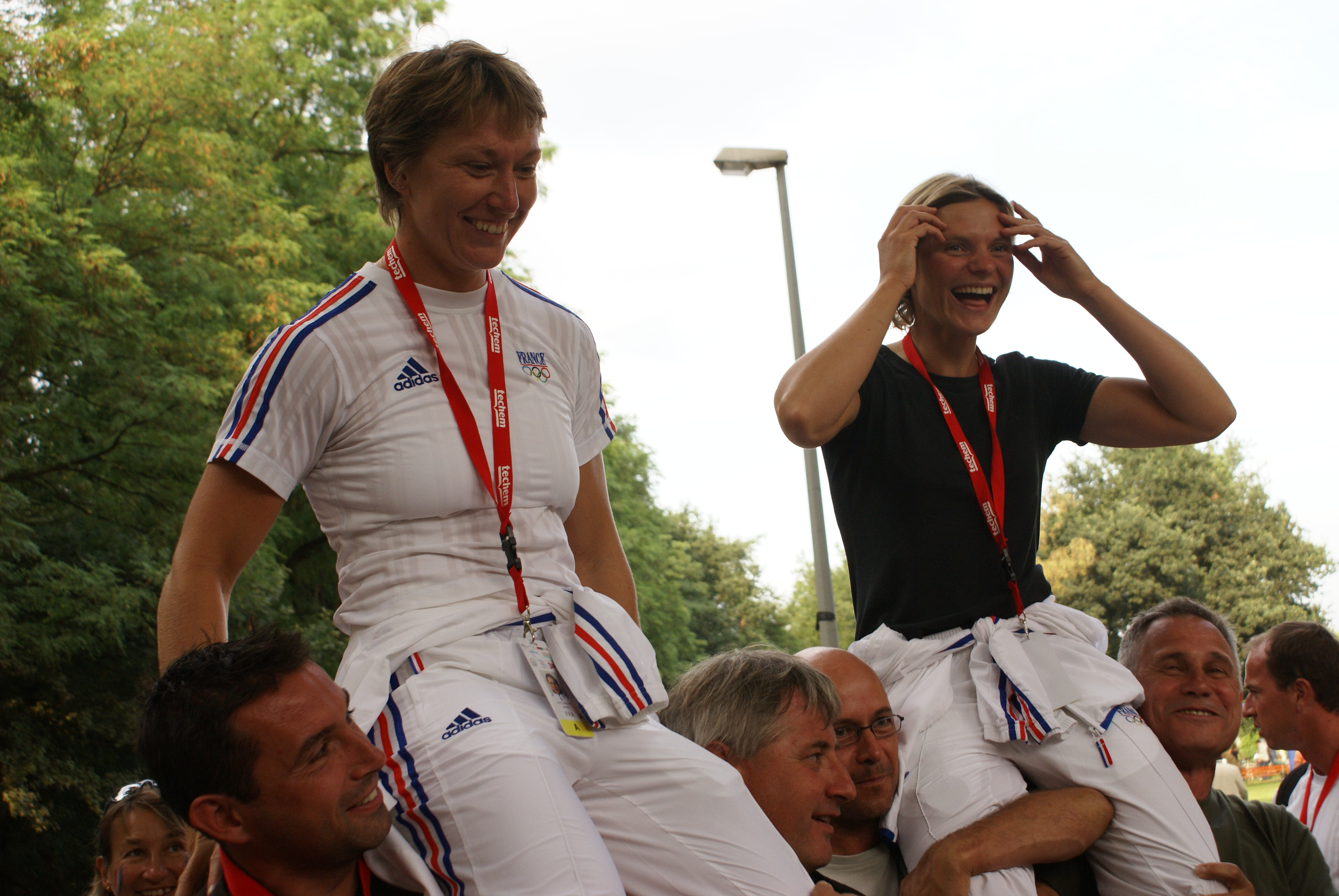
Marie Delattre and Anne-Laure Viard with supporters
