= Canoeing at the 2019 Pan American Games – Women's K-1 200 metres =

Women's K-1 200 metres at the 2019 Pan American Games
- Venue: Albufera Medio Mundo
- Dates: July 28–30
- Competitors: 12 from 12 nations
- Winning time: 42.979

Medalists
| Gold medal | Sabrina Ameghino | Argentina |
| Silver medal | Andréanne Langlois | Canada |
| Bronze medal | Beatriz Briones | Mexico |

The women's K-1 200 metres canoeing event at the 2019 Pan American Games was held between the 28 and 30 of July at the Albufera Medio Mundo in the city of Huacho.

== Results ==
=== Heats ===
Qualification Rules: 1..2->Final, 3..6->Semifinals, Rest Out

==== Heat 1 ====
| Rank | Athletes | Country | Time | Notes |
|---|---|---|---|---|
| 1 | Andréanne Langlois | Canada | 40.714 | F |
| 2 | Sabrina Ameghino | Argentina | 40.751 | F |
| 3 | Stefanie Perdomo | Ecuador | 42.411 | SF |
| 4 | Ana Paula Vergutz | Brazil | 42.711 | SF |
| 5 | Mara Guerrero | Venezuela | 44.546 | SF |
| 6 | Andrea Curbelo | Puerto Rico | 50.791 | SF |

==== Heat 2 ====
| Rank | Athletes | Country | Time | Notes |
|---|---|---|---|---|
| 1 | Beatriz Briones | Mexico | 41.993 | F |
| 2 | Ysumy Orellana | Chile | 43.258 | F |
| 3 | Elena Wolgamot | United States | 43.641 | SF |
| 4 | Flavia López | Cuba | 44.823 | SF |
| 5 | Grecia Gomringer | Peru | 57.671 | SF |
| 6 | Ruth Cruz | Belize | 1:11.448 | SF |

=== Semifinal ===
Qualification Rules: 1..4->Final, Rest Out

| Rank | Athletes | Country | Time | Notes |
|---|---|---|---|---|
| 1 | Stefanie Perdomo | Ecuador | 40.686 | F |
| 2 | Ana Paula Vergutz | Brazil | 40.746 | F |
| 3 | Elena Wolgamot | United States | 42.431 | F |
| 4 | Flavia López | Cuba | 43.121 | F |
| 5 | Mara Guerrero | Venezuela | 44.523 | |
| 6 | Andrea Curbelo | Puerto Rico | 48.048 | |
| 7 | Grecia Gomringer | Peru | 59.491 | |
| 8 | Ruth Cruz | Belize | 1:08.216 | |

=== Final ===
| Rank | Athletes | Country | Time | Notes |
|---|---|---|---|---|
| 1st place, gold medalist(s) | Sabrina Ameghino | Argentina | 42.979 | |
| 2nd place, silver medalist(s) | Andréanne Langlois | Canada | 43.406 | |
| 3rd place, bronze medalist(s) | Beatriz Briones | Mexico | 43.436 | |
| 4 | Ana Paula Vergutz | Brazil | 44.361 | |
| 5 | Stefanie Perdomo | Ecuador | 44.444 | |
| 6 | Ysumy Orellana | Chile | 45.121 | |
| 7 | Elena Wolgamot | United States | 46.209 | |
| 8 | Flavia López | Cuba | 47.744 | |
