= Helena Rodrigues =

Portuguese canoeist

Medal record

Women's canoe sprint

World Championships
Bronze medal – third place	2009 Dartmouth	K-4 200 m

Helena Rodrigues (born 2 December 1984) is a Portuguese sprint canoer.

== Career ==
Rodrigues has competed since the late 2000s. She won a bronze medal in the K-4 200 m event at the 2009 ICF Canoe Sprint World Championships in Dartmouth.

Rodrigues also competed in the K-2 500 m at the 2008 Summer Olympics in Beijing, but was eliminated in the semifinals.
