= Maggie Hogan =

American canoeist (born 1979)

Personal information
- Full name: Margaret Hogan
- Nickname: Maggs
- National team: United States
- Born: January 1, 1979 (age 47) Philadelphia, Pennsylvania, U.S.
- Education: University of California, Santa Barbara (1997–2001)
- Years active: 2005–present
- Height: 5 ft 7 in (170 cm)
- Weight: 134 lb (61 kg)

Sport
- Country: United States
- Sport: Canoe sprint
- Event(s): K-1 500m, 1000m, 5000m
- Club: Newport Aquatic Center
- Former partner: Kaitlyn McElroy
- Coached by: Michele Eray
Medal record
Women's Canoeing
Representing United States
Pan American Games
Bronze medal – third place	2011 Guadalajara	K–2 500 m.
ICF Canoe Sprint World Championships
Bronze medal – third place	2015 Milan	K–1 1000 m.
- Updated on 13:54, 28 July 2016 (UTC)

Margaret "Maggie" Hogan (born January 1, 1979) is an American canoe sprinter and former collegiate swimmer who is a member of the U.S. National Canoe and Kayak Team. She was the first American to qualify for the 2016 Summer Olympics in Rio de Janeiro for canoe sprinting.

== Early life and education ==
Hogan was born on January 1, 1979, in Philadelphia, Pennsylvania to Bill and Peg Hogan. She was raised in Colts Neck Township, New Jersey and attended Monmouth Regional High School where she was an All-American swimmer.

She matriculated to the University of California, Santa Barbara and swam as a student-athlete for the UC Santa Barbara Gauchos from 1997 to 2001. She joined the team as a freshman and in 1999 set the seventh-best time in school history for the 1650 Freestyle. She served as a team captain for the Gauchos in her junior and senior years. While enrolled, she won a silver medal as a member of the U.S. National Team at the 2000 World Life Saving Championships.

== Canoe career ==
After graduating from UCSB, Hogan attended the San Diego Regional Lifeguard Academy where she was introduced to canoe sprinting by another member of the class. Six months later, she participated at the 2005 ICF Canoe Sprint World Championships as member of the U.S. National Team. She has been a member of the national team each year since 2005.

Hogan attempted to qualify for the 2008 Summer Olympics and 2012 Summer Olympics, but narrowly missed out on each occasion. Disappointed with her finishes, she contemplated retiring from the sport before changing coaches to Michele Eray and the partnership has resulted in better finishes. She has competed in K-2 events alongside Kaitlyn McElroy, with the pair training at the Boathouse District in Oklahoma City, Oklahoma.

Hogan qualified for the 2016 Summer Olympics in Rio de Janeiro for canoe sprinting and was the first from the U.S. national team to do so. She qualified at Lake Lanier near Atlanta, which was the site used for the 1996 Summer Olympics.

== Personal life ==
While Hogan's home town is Huntington Beach, California, she currently resides in Oklahoma City, Oklahoma. She works for GE Transportation. In addition to her canoe sprinting career, she is also a competitive surf lifesaver.
