= Louisa Gurski =

British kayaker

Louisa Jane Gurski
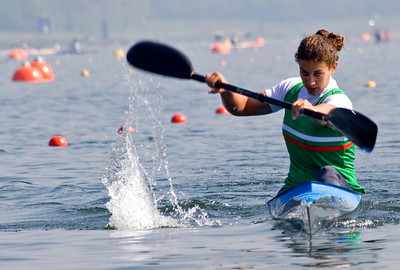
- Louisa Gurski racing at National Regatta in Nottingham

Personal information
- Nationality: British
- Born: 26 May 1988 (age 38) Chertsey, Surrey, England
- Height: 5 ft 8 in (1.73 m)

Sport
- Country: United Kingdom
- Sport: Flatwater Kayak
- Event(s): K1, K2, K4 Sprint and Marathon
- Club: Elmbridge Canoe Club
- Coached by: Miklos Simon
Medal record
World Championships
Gold medal – first place	2014 Moscow	K-1 5000 m
European Championships
Silver medal – second place	2013 Montemor-o-Velho	K-1 5000 m
Bronze medal – third place	2009 Brandenburg	K4 200m

Louisa Jane Gurski (née Sawers, born 26 May 1988) is a London 2012 Olympic Games finalist who competes in Sprint Kayaker for Great Britain. She was brought up in Walton-on-Thames and started Kayaking at Elmbridge Canoe Club, Weybridge at the age of 10.

== International results ==
Early success saw her win the 2006 World Junior Marathon Championships in both K1 and K2 events with Jessica Walker. She then moved to Marlow, Buckinghamshire to train with the Great Britain Kayaking team at Dorney Lake and Bisham Abbey.

=== 2009 ===
2009 was a breakthrough year in the Senior sprint events for Louisa, where she won a Bronze Medal at the 2009 Canoe Sprint European Championships in the K4 200m, 5th in the K4 500m at the same event. Another 5th at the 2009 ICF Canoe Sprint World Championships in Dartmouth, Canada confirmed the results were not a fluke. She finished the year with a Silver at the Under 23 Canoe Marathon World Championships in Gaia, Portugal.

=== 2010 ===
A solid year for Louisa in the Sprint event where she came 9th (K2 500m) at the 2010 Canoe Sprint European Championships in Trasona, Spain and then another 5th (k4 500m) at the 2010 ICF Canoe Sprint World Championships, gaining time on the medal positions.

=== 2011 ===
Remaining in the GB Women's K4 500m event throughout the year, Louisa was 6th at the 2011 Canoe Sprint European Championships in Belgrade, Serbia and this was followed by a 4th and Olympic qualification at the 2011 ICF Canoe Sprint World Championships in Szeged, Hungary.

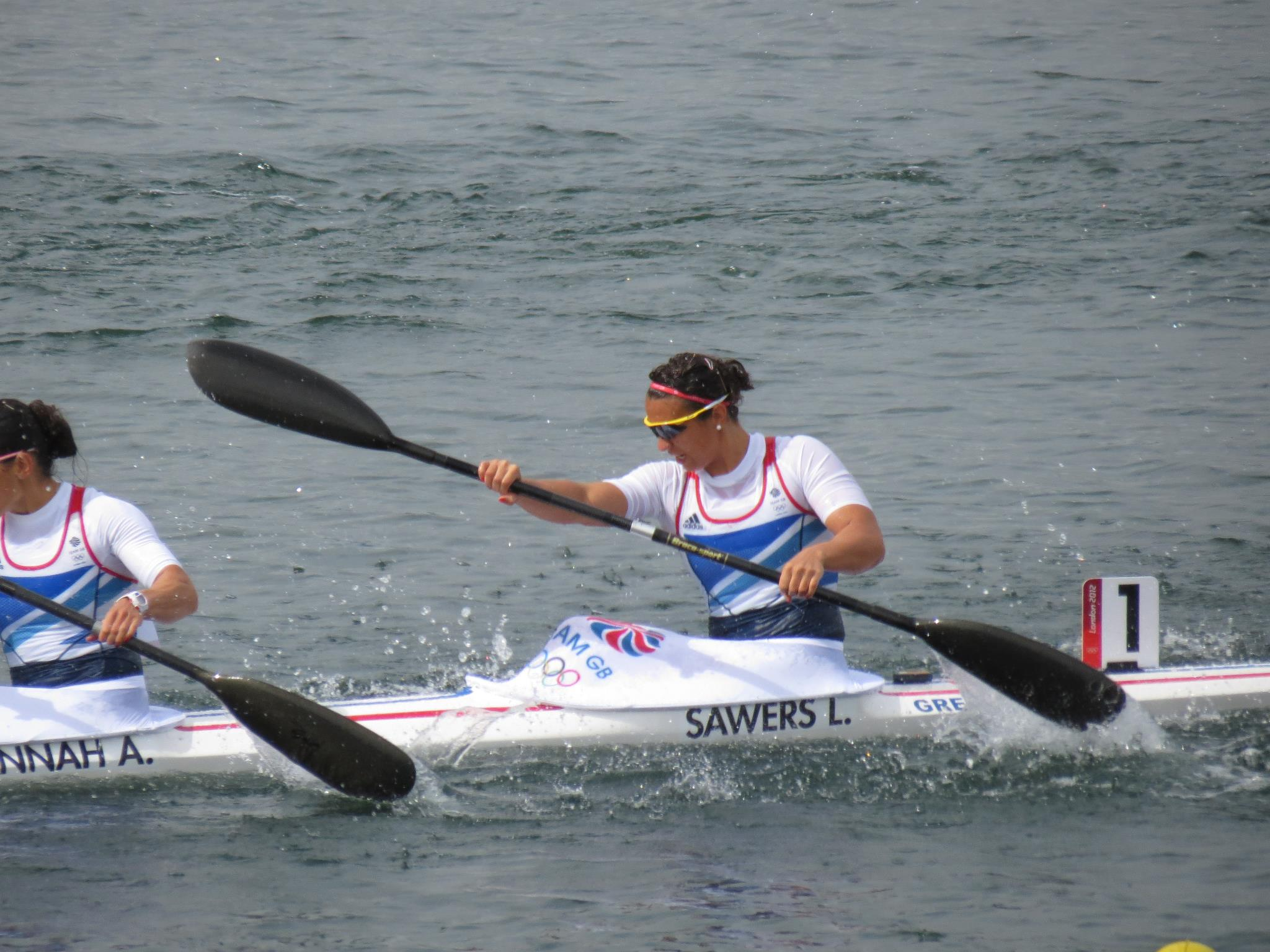
Louisa Gurski in the London 2012 Olympic women's K4 500m final

=== 2012 ===
Louisa started the season at the 2012 Canoe Sprint European Championships in Zagreb, Croatia, with a 4th in the Women's K4 500m event. At the London Olympics 2012 in August she came 5th in the Women's K4 500m final, competing with Rachel Cawthorn, Jess Walker and Angela Hannah. She came 11th in the K2 500m event with Abigail Edmonds.

2014

Sawers won the K-1 5000 m at the 2014 World Championships.

2016

Competing as Louisa Gurski, she was part of the Great Britain women's K-4 500 m team finished 7th along with Jess Walker, Rachel Cawthorn and Rebii Simon.

== Support and sponsors ==
She is supported by the UK Sport Olympic Podium Programme and sponsored by Sweaty Betty, Shock Absorber and Tesco.
