= Michele Eray =

South African canoeist

Michele Eray (born 5 May 1979) is a South African canoe sprinter, marathon canoeist, and surfski paddler who competed in the late 2000s. At the 2008 Summer Olympics in Beijing, she finished seventh in the K-4 500 m event while being eliminated in the semifinals of the K-2 500 m event. She finished first of the women in the 2011 Berg River Canoe Marathon, clocking an aggregate time of 19:06.02 in the 4-day event. Michele was the 2013 ICF Canoe Ocean racing (surfski) World Champion, won the silver medal at the 2015 ICF Ocean Racing World Championships. She won the bronze medal at the 2007 ICF Canoe Marathon World Championships. and placed 4th four times. She has also won the notorious Cape Point Challenge Surfski Race 4 times.

She moved to the US to become Sprint High Performance Manager at USA Canoe Kayak.

She represented the US in the ICF Marathon World Championships in the WK1 in 2014, finishing 11th as well as placing 4th in 2015, and 7th in 2018, both in the WK2 event.
