= Jenni Honkanen =

Finnish canoeist

Medal record

Women's canoe sprint

Representing Finland

World Championships
Bronze medal – third place	2006 Szeged	K-2 200 m

Jenni Honkanen-Mikkonen (born 24 February 1980 in Lahti) is a Finnish sprint canoeist who has competed since the mid-2000s. She won a bronze medal in the K-2 200 m event at the 2006 ICF Canoe Sprint World Championships in Szeged.

Honkanen-Mikkonen also competed in three Summer Olympics, earning her best finish of seventh in the K-2 500 m event at Beijing in 2008.

Her husband, Kalle, also competes as a sprint canoer for Finland.
