= Abigail Edmonds =

British canoeist

Abigail Susan Elisabeth Edmonds (born 26 September 1990 in Watford) is a British canoeist that was chosen to represent Great Britain at the London 2012 Olympics. She competed in the K-2 500 m with Louisa Sawers-Gurski, finishing in 11th place.
