= Alana Nicholls =

Australian kayaker (born 1986)

Personal information
- Nickname: Lans
- Nationality: Australian
- Born: 6 April 1986 (age 40) Perth, Western Australia
- Height: 172 cm (68 in) (2012)
- Weight: 66 kg (146 lb) (2012)

Sport
- Country: Australia
- Sport: Canoeing
- Events: K-1 200 m K-1 500 m
- Club: Bayswater Paddle Sport Club

Alana Nicholls (born 6 April 1986) is an Australian kayaker. She represented Australia at the 2012 Summer Olympics in the K-1 200 m and K-1 500 m events.

== Personal ==
Nicknamed "Lans", Nicholls was born 6 April 1986 in Perth, Western Australia.

She attended Our Lady of Lourdes in Perth before going to high school at Chisholm Catholic College. She has a part-time job working for CITIC Pacific Mining Management, a mining company. As of 2012, she lives in the Perth suburb of City Beach.

Nicholls 172 centimetres (68 in) is tall and weighs 66 kilograms (146 lb).

== Canoeing ==
Nicholls is a member of the Bayswater Paddle Sport Club, and has a canoe scholarship with the WA Institute of Sport and the Australian Institute of Sport. Her primary training base is in Bayswater, Western Australia with a secondary base on the Gold Coast of Queensland.

Nicholls competed at her first World Cup event, World Cup 2 in the Czech Republic, in 2011 where she won the K-1 500 m event. She finished 4th in the K1 200m event and 5th in the K1 500m event at the 2011 World Championships in Szeged, Hungary. She finished 2nd in the K1 500m event at the World Cup 1 in Poznan, Poland. She was the 2011 Australian Canoeing Athlete of the Year. In 2012, she medaled in the K-1 200 m and K-1 500 m events at World Cups in May: she finished 1st in the K1 500m event and 1st in the K1 200m event at the 2012 National Championships in Penrith, Australia. She finished 1st in the K1 500m event and 2nd in the K1 200m event at the 2012 Sprint Oceania Championships in Penrith, Australia.

Nicholls has been selected to represent Australia at 2012 Summer Olympics in the K-1 200 m and K-1 500 m events.

Before the start of the Games, she and her canoe teammates trained in Italy at the AIS European Training Centre located in Varese.
