= Sabrina Ameghino =

Argentine sprint canoeist (born 1980)

Personal information
- Born: July 6, 1980 (age 46)

Sport
- Sport: Canoe sprint
Medal record
Representing Argentina
Pan American Games
Gold medal – first place	2019 Lima	K-1 200 m
Silver medal – second place	2011 Guadalajara	K-2 500 m
Silver medal – second place	2015 Toronto	K-2 500 m
Bronze medal – third place	2011 Guadalajara	K-1 200 m
Bronze medal – third place	2015 Toronto	K-1 200 m
Bronze medal – third place	2015 Toronto	K-4 500 m
Bronze medal – third place	2019 Lima	K-4 500 m
Bronze medal – third place	2023 Santiago	K-4 500 m

Sabrina Inés Ameghino (born July 6, 1980) is an Argentine sprint canoeist. She competed at the 2016 Summer Olympics in the women's K-1 200 metres race, in which she reached the semifinals, and as part of the 13th-place Argentina team in the women's K-4 500 metres race.

In the 2019 Pan American Games celebrated in Lima, Perú, Ameghino won two more medals, including a gold in the Women's K-1 200 metres category, becoming the first Argentine canoeing woman with a gold medal in the Pan American Games.
