= Maricela Montemayor =

Mexican canoeist (born 1991)

Personal information
- Born: 4 December 1991 (age 34) Monterrey, Mexico
- Height: 1.61 m (5 ft 3 in)
- Weight: 60 kg (132 lb)

Sport
- Country: Mexico
- Sport: Sprint kayak
- Event: K–2 1000 m
Medal record
Women's canoe sprint
Representing Mexico
World Championships
Bronze medal – third place	2019 Szeged	K-2 1000 m
Bronze medal – third place	2022 Dartmouth	K-4 500 m
Pan American Games
Gold medal – first place	2023 Santiago	K-4 500 m
Silver medal – second place	2011 Guadalajara	K-4 500 m
Silver medal – second place	2019 Lima	K-4 500 m
Bronze medal – third place	2015 Toronto	K-2 500 m

Maricela Montemayor (born 4 December 1991) is a Mexican sprint canoeist.

She won a medal at the 2019 ICF Canoe Sprint World Championships.
