= Kathleen Fraser (canoeist) =

Canadian sprint kayaker

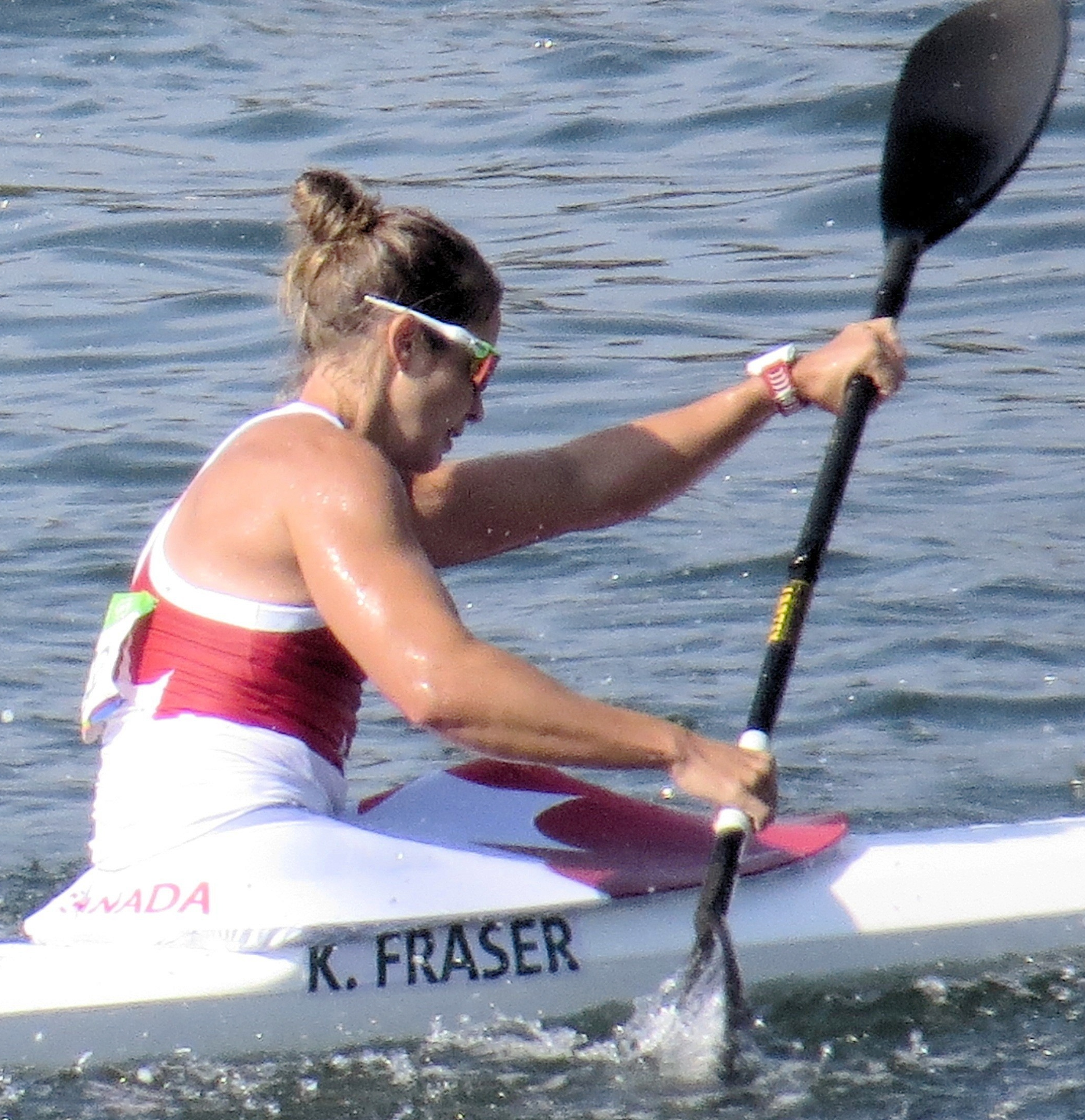
- Fraser at the 2016 Olympics

Personal information
- Nationality: Canadian
- Born: March 29, 1986 (age 40) Pierrefonds, Quebec
- Education: Lakehead University
- Height: 173 cm (5 ft 8 in)
- Weight: 68 kg (150 lb)

Sport
- Sport: Canoe sprint
- Club: Balmy Beach Canoe Club
- Coached by: Peter Martinek (club); Mark Granger (national)
Medal record
Representing Canada
Pan American Games
Gold medal – first place	2011 Guadalajara	K-4 500 metres
Gold medal – first place	2015 Toronto	K-4 500 metres

Kathleen Fraser (born March 29, 1986) is a professional Canadian Olympian who competes as a sprint kayaker. Competing in the K-4 500 meters event, she won two gold medals in 2011, and placed 8th in the 2015 Pan American Games and placed eighth at the 2016 Olympics.

Fraser took up kayaking aged 14. She studied geography, parks and recreation at the Lakehead University.
