= Émilie Fournel =

Canadian sprint kayaker

Personal information
- Nationality: Canadian
- Born: October 26, 1986 (age 39) Montreal, Quebec, Canada
- Height: 1.55 m (5 ft 1 in)
- Weight: 59 kg (130 lb)

Sport
- Sport: Kayaking
- Events: K-1 200m, K-1 500m
Medal record
Women's canoe sprint
Representing Canada
World Championships
Bronze medal – third place	2009 Dartmouth	K-1 4 x 200 m
Bronze medal – third place	2015 Milan	K-1 5000 m
Pan American Games
Gold medal – first place	2003 Santo Domingo	K-4 500 metres
Gold medal – first place	2015 Toronto	K-4 500 metres
Silver medal – second place	2003 Santo Domingo	K-2 500 metres
Silver medal – second place	2011 Guadalajara	K-1 500 metres

Émilie Fournel (born October 26, 1986) is a Canadian sprint kayaker who has competed since the late 2000s. She won a bronze medal in the K-1 4 x 200 m event at the 2009 ICF Canoe Sprint World Championships in Dartmouth, and in the K-1 5000 m at the 2015 ICF Canoe Sprint World Championships.

Fournel competed in the K-4 500 m event at the 2008 Summer Olympics in Beijing, but was eliminated in the semifinals, and the K-1 200 m and 500 m at the 2012 Summer Olympics.

Her father, Jean Fournel, competed for Canada in sprint canoe at the 1976 Summer Olympics in Montreal. Her brother Hugues Fournel also competed at the 2012 Summer Olympics in the Men's K-2 200 metres with Ryan Cochrane.

In July 2016, she was officially named to Canada's Olympic team.
