= Carrie Johnson (canoeist) =

American sprint canoer (born 1984)

Personal information
- National team: United States
- Born: January 16, 1984 (age 42) San Diego, California, United States

Sport
- Sport: Canoeing
- Event(s): 200m, 500m
- Partner: David Gubser
- Coached by: Stein Jorgensen

Achievements and titles
- Olympic finals: Semifinals: K-1 500 m, K-4 500 m (2004); semifinals: K-1 500 m (2008); semi-final K-1: 200 m, first round: K-1 500 m (2012)
- World finals: 8th: K-1 500 m, K-1 1000 m (2005); 6th: K-1 500 m, 7th: K-1 1000 m (2006); 4th: K-1 1000 m, 5th: K-1 500 m (2007); 10th K-2 500 m (2010)
- Regional finals: 1st: K-1 500 m (2011 Pan American Games)
Medal record
Representing United States
Pan American Games
Gold medal – first place	2011 Guadalajara	K-1 200m
Gold medal – first place	2011 Guadalajara	K-1 500m
- Updated on 17 June 2017

Carrie Ann Johnson (born January 16, 1984) is an American sprint canoer who has competed in the individual and team Canoeing events at the 2004, 2008 and 2012 Summer Olympics

== Career ==
Johnson was coached by Stein Jorgensen and competed in both 200 m and 500 m distances. She trained in San Diego. She was a surprise qualifier for the US team for the Athens Olympics, and was the youngest member of the US's canoeing and kayaking team. At the 2004 Summer Olympics in Athens, she was eliminated in the semifinals of both the K-1 500 m and the K-4 500 m events. In the K-4 500 m her teammates were Kathy Colin, Lauren Spalding and Marie Mijalis.

At the 2005 ICF Sprint Canoe World Championships, Johnson finished 8th in the K-1 500 m and 8th in the K-1 1000 m. At the 2006 ICF Sprint Canoe World Championships, Johnson finished 6th in the K-1 500 m and 7th in the K-1 1000 m. At the 2007 ICF Sprint Canoe World Championships, Johnson finished 4th in the K-1 1000 m and 5th in the K-1 500 m. At the 2010 ICF Sprint Canoe World Championships, Johnson and her teammate Krisztina Fazekas-Zur finished 10th in the K-2 500 m event, winning the B-final.

She was the first US canoeist to qualify for the 2008 Summer Olympics, where she was eliminated in the semifinals of the K-1 500 m event. She was again the first US canoeist to qualify for the 2012 Summer Olympics, winning the K-1 500 m at the 2011 Pan American Games (she also won the K-1 200 m). She went on to win the same event at the US Olympic trials in April 2012. At the 2012 Summer Olympics, she reached the semi-final of the K-1 200 m, and the first round of the K-1 500 m.

== Personal life ==
Before she became a canoeist, she was a gymnast for ten years. She discovered canoeing through a junior lifeguard programme. The kayaking club was run by Chris Barlow, who had himself been an Olympian in 1992. She had broken her arm doing gymnastics, and was looking for another sport to participate in. She believes that the body control and strength she gained through gymnastics have helped her canoeing.

Johnson competed at Olympic level despite being diagnosed with Crohn's Disease in 2003, and the disease causing her to miss both the 2003 and 2009 seasons. The disease also led to her having to turn down a place at the 2003 Canoe World Championships. After the 2012 Summer Olympics, she joined UC-Davis to study veterinary medicine having previously gained a biochemistry degree from UC-San Diego. Her fiancé is David Gubser, a Swiss kayaker.

== See also ==
- List of people diagnosed with Crohn's disease
