= Kristin Ann Gauthier =

Canadian sprint kayaker

Personal information
- Born: February 16, 1981 (age 45) Toronto, Ontario, Canada
- Height: 1.73 m (5 ft 8 in)
- Weight: 65 kg (143 lb)

Sport
- Sport: Kayaking
- Event(s): K-2 500m, K-4 500m
Medal record
Women's canoe sprint
Pan American Games
Gold medal – first place	2011 Guadalajara	K-4 500 metres

Kristin Ann Gauthier (born February 16, 1981) is a Canadian sprint kayaker who competed in the late 2000s. At the 2008 Summer Olympics in Beijing, she was eliminated in the semifinals of both the K-2 500 m and the K-4 500 m events.
