= Portugal national table tennis team =

The team is composed by Marcos Freitas, Tiago Apolónia and João Pedro Monteiro.Portugal reached the quarter-finals at 2012 Olympic Games in London, beating in the first round Great Britain and losing the quarter-finals against South Korea 2-3.

== Current team ==
- Marcos Freitas
- João Monteiro
- Tiago Apolónia
- Diogo Carvalho
- João Geraldo

== 2013 European Championships Qualifiers ==
=== Group A ===
Team	Pld	W	D	L	GF	GA	GD	Pts
Germany	3	3	0	0	9	1	0	6
Portugal	3	3	0	0	9	2	0	6
France	3	2	0	1	7	5	0	5
Spain	3	1	0	2	3	7	0	4
Serbia	3	0	0	3	4	9	0	3
Sweden	3	0	0	3	1	9	0	3

== Fixtures ==
4 September 2012; 20:45 UTC+1	Portugal	3–1	France	Pavilhão Casal Vistoso, Lisbon

18 September 2012; 20:45 UTC+1	Serbia	1–3	Portugal	Subotica

20 November 2012; 20:45 UTC+1	Portugal	3–0	Spain	Caldas da Rainha
