= Pista de remo y canotaje (Ciudad Guzmán) =

Rowing and canoeing venue in Ciudad Guzmán, Mexico

The Rowing and Canoeing course is a rowing and canoeing venue in Lake Zapotlán built at a cost of 30-40 million pesos in Ciudad Guzmán, Jalisco, Mexico. It was built to host the rowing and canoeing events at the 2011 Pan American Games. The complex included temporary stands for 1,000 spectators, a return canal, gymnasium and boathouse. After the games it will serve as a training center and host to national and international competitions.

== See also ==
- Rowing at the 2011 Pan American Games
- Canoeing at the 2011 Pan American Games
