= Alexandra Keresztesi =

Hungarian-born Argentine sprint canoer

Personal information
- Born: 26 April 1983 (age 43) Budapest, Hungary

Sport
- Sport: Canoeing
Medal record
Representing Hungary
World Championships
Gold medal – first place	2006 Szeged	K-4 1000 m
Gold medal – first place	2007 Duisburg	K-4 1000 m
Bronze medal – third place	2002 Sevilla	K-4 1000 m
Representing Argentina
Pan American Games
Silver medal – second place	2011 Guadalajara	K-2 500 m
Silver medal – second place	2015 Toronto	K-2 500 m
Bronze medal – third place	2011 Guadalajara	K-1 500 m
Bronze medal – third place	2015 Toronto	K-4 500 m

Alexandra Keresztesi (26 April 1983 in Budapest) is a Hungarian-born Argentine sprint canoer who has competed since the mid first decade of the 21st century. She won two gold medals in the K-4 1000 m event at the ICF Canoe Sprint World Championships, earning them in 2006 and 2007.

She is currently married to Miguel Correa, an Olympic Argentine paddler who took the 5th place of K2 200m at the 2012 Summer Olympics.
