= Natalia Lobova =

Russian canoeist

Personal information
- Born: 3 September 1986 (age 40)
Medal record
Women's canoe sprint
Representing Russia
World Championships
Silver medal – second place	2011 Szeged	K-1 4 x 200 m
Silver medal – second place	2014 Moscow	K-1 4 x 200 m
Bronze medal – third place	2010 Poznań	K-1 4 x 200 m
Bronze medal – third place	2013 Duisburg	K–1 4 x 200 m
European Championships
Gold medal – first place	2011 Belgrade	K-1 200 m
Bronze medal – third place	2014 Brandenburg	K-4 500 m

Natalia Lobova (born 3 September 1986) is a Russian sprint canoer who has competed since the late 2000s. She won two silver medals, both in the K-1 4 × 200 m event, at the 2011 and 2014 World Championships, and bronze medals in the K-1 4 × 200 m event at the 2010 ICF Canoe Sprint World Championships in Poznań, and in the K-1 200 m relay at the 2013 World Championships. At the 2011 Canoe Sprint European Championships she won the gold medal at the K-1 200m race.
