= Canoeing at the 2022 South American Games =

- Venue: Bahía de Asunción – Club Mbiguá (sprint); Canal de Piracema (slalom)
- Dates: October 11−14
- Nations: 10

Canoeing competitions at the 2022 South American Games in Asunción, Paraguay were held between October 11 and 14, 2022 at the Bahía de Asunción – Club Mbiguá and Canal de Piracema.

== Schedule ==
The competition schedule is as follows:

P	Preliminary	F	Final

Slalom
Date Event	Wed 12	Thu 13	Fri 14
Men's C-1		P	F
Men's K-1		P	F
Men's extreme	F		
Women's C-1		P	F
Women's K-1		P	F
Women's extreme	F		

Sprint
Date Event	Tue 11	Wed 12	Thu 13
Men's C-1 1000 m	F		
Men's C-2 500 m		F	
Men's K-1 200 m			F
Men's K-1 1000 m	F		
Men's K-2 500 m		F	
Men's K-4 500 m		F	
Women's C-1 200 m			F
Women's C-2 500 m		F	
Women's K-1 200 m			F
Women's K-1 500 m		F	
Women's K-2 500 m		F	
Women's K-4 500 m		F	

== Medal summary ==
=== Medal table ===
* Host nation (Paraguay)

Rank	Nation	Gold	Silver	Bronze	Total
1	Argentina	9	3	3	15
2	Brazil	5	2	5	12
3	Colombia	2	4	1	7
4	Chile	2	1	3	6
5	Uruguay	0	3	0	3
6	Venezuela	0	2	4	6
7	Paraguay*	0	2	1	3
8	Ecuador	0	1	1	2
Totals (8 entries)		18	18	18	54

=== Medalists ===
==== Slalom ====
Men

Event	Gold	Silver	Bronze
C-1	Sebastián Rossi; Argentina	Leonardo Curcel; Paraguay	Kauã da Silva; Brazil
K-1	Pepe Gonçalves; Brazil	Lucas Rossi; Argentina	Andraz Echeverría; Chile
Extreme	Pepe Gonçalves; Brazil	Matías Contreras; Argentina	Alexis Pérez; Venezuela

Women

Event	Gold	Silver	Bronze
C-1	Ana Sátila; Brazil	Ana Paula Fernández; Paraguay	Iris Castiglione; Argentina
K-1	Omira Estácia Neta; Brazil	María Cassini; Argentina	Ana Paula Fernández; Paraguay
Extreme	Ana Sátila; Brazil	Florencia Aguirre; Chile	Nadia Riquelme; Argentina

==== Sprint ====
Men

Event	Gold		Silver		Bronze	
C-1 1000 metres	Alejandro Rodríguez; Colombia	4:11.37	Edwar Paredes; Venezuela	4:24.04	Isaquias Queiroz; Brazil	4:29.02
C-2 500 metres	Alejandro Rodríguez; Daniel Pacheco; Colombia	1:43.89	Edwar Paredes; Luis Guerra; Venezuela	1:45.81	Erlon Silva; Filipe Vieira; Brazil	1:46.07
K-1 200 metres	Gonzalo Lo Moro; Argentina	34.96	Edson Silva; Brazil	35.88	Daniel Román; Venezuela	36.21
K-1 1000 metres	Agustín Vernice; Argentina	3:51.29	Matías Otero; Uruguay	3:54.83	Vagner Souta; Brazil	3:58.55
K-2 500 metres	Gonzalo Carreras; Gonzalo Lo Moro; Argentina	1:31.52	Erick Cabrera; Matías Otero; Uruguay	1:33.09	Edson Silva; Vagner Souta; Brazil	1:34.02
K-4 500 metres	Agustín Rodríguez; Agustín Vernice; Juan Ignacio Cáceres; Manuel Lascano; Argentina	1:31.52	Erick Cabrera; Luís Melo; Matías Otero; Sebastián Delgado; Uruguay	1:33.09	Cristian Canache; Daniel Román; Rafael Cardoza; Ray Acuña; Venezuela	1:34.02

Women

Event	Gold		Silver		Bronze	
C-1 200 metres	María Mailliard; Chile	46.32	Manuela Gómez; Colombia	48.46	Martina Vela; Argentina	49.10
C-2 500 metres	Karen Roco; María Mailliard; Chile	1:56.76	Manuela Gómez; Yurely Marín; Colombia	2:04.02	Anggie Avegno; Neida Angulo; Ecuador	2:08.54
K-1 200 metres	Brenda Rojas; Argentina	41.03	Stefanie Perdomo; Ecuador	42.17	Yocelin Canache; Venezuela	42.19
K-1 500 metres	Brenda Rojas; Argentina	1:56.33	Ana Paula Vergutz; Brazil	1:58.90	Mónica Hincapié; Colombia	2:01.53
K-2 500 metres	Brenda Rojas; Magdalena Garro; Argentina	1:47.41	Diexe Molina; Tatiana Muñoz; Colombia	1:49.12	Daniela Castillo; Jeanarett Valenzuela; Chile	1:51.19
K-4 500 metres	Candelaria Sequeira; Lucía Aziz; Paulina Contini; Sabrina Ameghino; Argentina	1:38.11	Diexe Molina; Karen Molina; Mónica Hincapié; Tatiana Muñoz; Colombia	1:39.61	Daniela Castillo; Goviana Reyes; Jeanarett Valenzuela; Ysumy Orellana; Chile	1:40.08

== Participation ==
Ten nations participated in canoeing events of the 2022 South American Games.

- Argentina
- Bolivia
- Brazil
- Chile
- Colombia
- Ecuador
- Paraguay
- Peru
- Uruguay
- Venezuela

== Results ==
=== Men's slalom C–1 ===
Rank	Name	Nation	Preliminary Heats						Semifinal			Final	
Rank	Name	Nation	1st Ride	Pen.	2nd Ride	Pen.	Best	Rank	Time	Pen.	Rank	Time	Pen.
1st place, gold medalist(s)	Sebastián Rossi	Argentina	92.11	2	95.54	4	92.11	1 Q	93.46	0	2 Q	89.67	0
2nd place, silver medalist(s)	Leonardo Curcel	Paraguay	96.72	2	99.64	4	96.72	3 Q	93.43	2	1 Q	95.10	2
3rd place, bronze medalist(s)	Kauã da Silva	Brazil	124.10	4	93.46	2	93.46	2 Q	110.78	2	3 Q	98.42	8
4	José Calasanza Silva	Venezuela	115.14	4	115.59	4	115.14	4 Q	112.36	8	4 Q	122.43	8
5	Geral Soto	Chile	149.84	22	178.45	60	149.84	5 Q	120.41	4	5	Did not advance	
6	John Hunter Rodríguez	Peru	DNS		334.23	210	334.23	6	Did not advance				

=== Men's slalom K–1 ===
Rank	Name	Nation	Preliminary Heats						Semifinal			Final	
Rank	Name	Nation	1st Ride	Pen.	2nd Ride	Pen.	Best	Rank	Time	Pen.	Rank	Time	Pen.
1st place, gold medalist(s)	Pepe Gonçalves	Brazil	80.42	0	83.97	2	80.42	1 Q	82.92	4	1 Q	82.76	4
2nd place, silver medalist(s)	Lucas Rossi	Argentina	85.77	2	85.95	2	85.77	2 Q	88.25	4	2 Q	84.62	2
3rd place, bronze medalist(s)	Andraz Echeverría	Chile	99.89	6	90.16	2	90.16	3 Q	98.61	8	3 Q	91.85	2
4	Leonardo Curcel	Paraguay	115.73	8	106.00	2	106.00	5 Q	111.15	4	4 Q	116.89	6
5	Alexis Pérez	Venezuela	95.59	2	95.57	2	95.57	4 Q	159.30	54	5	Did not advance	
6	Eriberto Gutiérrez	Peru	DSQ-R		121.03	4	121.03	6	Did not advance				

=== Men's kayak cross ===
Time trial

Rank	Name	Nation	Time	Notes
1	Pepe Gonçalves	Brazil	35.29	Q
2	Matías Contreras	Argentina	35.45	Q
3	Andraz Echeverría	Chile	36.49	Q
4	Guilherme Rodrigues	Brazil	36.83	
5	Alexis Pérez	Venezuela	37.36	Q
6	Lucas Varas	Chile	37.37	
7	Kauã da Silva	Brazil	30.02	
8	Leonardo Curcel	Paraguay	39.08	Q
9	John Hunter Rodríguez	Peru	39.37	Q

Semifinals

Heat	Rank	Name	Nation	Notes
1	1	Pepe Gonçalves	Brazil	Q
1	2	Alexis Pérez	Venezuela	Q
1	3	John Hunter Rodríguez	Peru	
2	1	Andraz Echeverría	Chile	Q
2	2	Matías Contreras	Argentina	Q
2	3	Leonardo Curcel	Paraguay	

Final

Rank	Name	Nation
1st place, gold medalist(s)	Pepe Gonçalves	Brazil
2nd place, silver medalist(s)	Matías Contreras	Argentina
3rd place, bronze medalist(s)	Alexis Pérez	Venezuela
4	Andraz Echeverría	Chile

=== Women's slalom C–1 ===
Rank	Name	Nation	Preliminary Heats						Semifinal			Final	
Rank	Name	Nation	1st Ride	Pen.	2nd Ride	Pen.	Best	Rank	Time	Pen.	Rank	Time	Pen.
1st place, gold medalist(s)	Ana Sátila	Brazil	104.07	4	99.86	4	99.86	1 Q	93.50	0	1 Q	99.07	4
2nd place, silver medalist(s)	Ana Paula Fernandez	Paraguay	225.75	108	164.56	54	164.56	3 Q	119.77	6	2 Q	129.64	10
3rd place, bronze medalist(s)	Iris Nerea	Argentina	128.39	6	132.42	8	128.39	2 Q	128.90	10	3 Q	283.50	156
4	María Jesús Inzunza	Chile	DNF		DNS		DNF	4 Q	DNF		4 Q	DNS	
5	Yuskarli Castillo	Venezuela	DNS					4	Did not advance				

=== Women's slalom K–1 ===
Rank	Name	Nation	Preliminary Heats						Semifinal			Final	
Rank	Name	Nation	1st Ride	Pen.	2nd Ride	Pen.	Best	Rank	Time	Pen.	Rank	Time	Pen.
1st place, gold medalist(s)	Omira Estácia Neta	Brazil	100.87	6	92.85	0	92.85	1 Q	96.40	2	1 Q	95.16	2
2nd place, silver medalist(s)	María Luz Cassini	Argentina	121.14	0	108.89	4	108.89	2 Q	113.44	14	2 Q	104.52	2
3rd place, bronze medalist(s)	Ana Paula Fernandes	Paraguay	122.88	6	176.72	54	122.88	3 Q	129.31	4	4 Q	120.71	4
4	Florencia Aguirre	Chile	124.31	6	140.67	6	124.31	4 Q	128.27	12	3 Q	121.41	12
5	Lenny Ramirez	Peru	281.58	114	203.25	62	203.25	5 Q	DNF		5	Did not advance	
6	Marianna Torres	Venezuela	DNF		DNS		DNF	6	Did not advance				

=== Women's kayak cross ===
Time trial

Rank	Name	Nation	Time	Notes
1	Ana Sátila	Brazil	37.15	Q
2	Omira Estácia Neta	Brazil	37.60	
3	Beatriz Da Motta	Brazil	39.41	
4	Florencia Aguirre	Chile	39.63	Q
5	Nadia Riquelme	Argentina	40.92	Q
6	María Jesús Inzunza	Chile	41.28	
7	Josefa Sepúlveda	Chile	41.46	
8	Ana Paula Fernandez	Paraguay	42.58	Q
9	Lenny Ramirez	Peru	44.68	Q

Semifinals

Heat	Rank	Name	Nation	Notes
1	1	Ana Sátila	Brazil	Q
1	2	Florencia Aguirre	Chile	Q
2	1	Nadia Riquelme	Argentina	Q
2	2	Ana Paula Fernandez	Paraguay	Q
2	3	Lenny Ramirez	Peru	

Final

Rank	Name	Nation
1st place, gold medalist(s)	Ana Sátila	Brazil
2nd place, silver medalist(s)	Florencia Aguirre	Chile
3rd place, bronze medalist(s)	Nadia Riquelme	Argentina
4	Ana Paula Fernandez	Paraguay

=== Men's C–1 1000m ===
Rank	Name	Nation	Time
1st place, gold medalist(s)	Alejandro Rodríguez	Colombia	4:11.37
2nd place, silver medalist(s)	Edwar Paredes	Venezuela	4:24.04
3rd place, bronze medalist(s)	Isaquias Queiroz	Brazil	4:29.02
4	Cristhian Sola	Ecuador	4:29.77
5	Matías Jimenez	Chile	4:41.18
6	Joaquín Lukac	Argentina	4:41.23

=== Men's C–2 500m ===
Rank	Name	Nation	Time
1st place, gold medalist(s)	Alejandro Rodríguez / Daniel Pacheco	Colombia	1:43.89
2nd place, silver medalist(s)	Edwar Paredes / Luis Guerra	Venezuela	1:45.81
3rd place, bronze medalist(s)	Erlon Silva / Filipe Vieira	Brazil	1:46.07
4	Benjamín Cardozo / Joaquín Lukac	Argentina	1:49.24
5	Matías Jimenez / Michael Martínez	Chile	1:53.07
6	Andrés Lazo / Cristhian Sola	Ecuador	1:53.65

=== Men's K–1 200m ===
Rank	Name	Nation	Time
1st place, gold medalist(s)	Gonzalo Benassi	Argentina	34.96
2nd place, silver medalist(s)	Edson Silva	Brazil	35.88
3rd place, bronze medalist(s)	Daniel Román	Venezuela	36.21
4	Matías Nuñez	Chile	36.31
5	Juan Arbelaez	Colombia	38.54
6	Martín Gorriti	Uruguay	39.30
7	Sergio Velasquez	Bolivia	42.48
8	Segundo Angulo	Peru	42.98
9	Enrique Prieto	Paraguay	DNF

=== Men's K–1 1000m ===
Rank	Name	Nation	Time
1st place, gold medalist(s)	Agustín Vernice	Argentina	3:51.29
2nd place, silver medalist(s)	Matías Otero	Uruguay	3:54.83
3rd place, bronze medalist(s)	Vagner Souta	Brazil	3:58.55
4	Leocadio Pinto	Colombia	4:06.60
5	Rafael Cardoza	Venezuela	4:11.11
6	Mario Valencia	Chile	4:23.03
7	Segundo Angulo	Peru	4:35.72
8	Luis Jimenez	Bolivia	4:48.70

=== Men's K–2 500m ===
Rank	Name	Nation	Time
1st place, gold medalist(s)	Gonzalo Carreras / Gonzalo Benassi	Argentina	1:31.52
2nd place, silver medalist(s)	Erick Cabrera / Matías Otero	Uruguay	1:33.09
3rd place, bronze medalist(s)	Edson Silva / Vagner Souta	Brazil	1:34.02
4	Cristian Canache / Ray Acuña	Venezuela	1:36.68
5	Miguel Pinzon / Victor Baron	Colombia	1:40.89
6	Julián Cartes / Marcelo Godoy	Chile	1:41.24
7	Esteven Hidalgo / Segundo Angulo	Peru	1:53.91
8	Luis Jimenez / Sergio Velasquez	Bolivia	1:56.64
9	Enrique Prieto / Francisco Fleitas	Paraguay	2:22.55

=== Men's K–4 500m ===
Rank	Name	Nation	Time
1st place, gold medalist(s)	Agustín Rodríguez / Agustín Vernice / Juan Ignacio Cáceres / Manuel Lascano	Argentina	1:23.24
2nd place, silver medalist(s)	Erick Cabrera / Luis Melo / Matías Otero / Sebastián Delgado	Uruguay	1:23.78
3rd place, bronze medalist(s)	Cristian Canache / Daniel Román / Rafael Cardoza / Ray Acuña	Venezuela	1:26.80
4	Juan Arbelaez / Leocadio Pinto / Miguel Pinzón / Victor Baron	Colombia	1:28.04
5	Julián Cartes / Marcelo Godoy / Mario Valencia / Matías Nuñez	Chile	1:30.49
6	Candelario Sánchez / Luis Jimenez / Sergio Velasquez / Yurgen Orellana	Bolivia	1:47.84
7	Abel Ramirez / Ariel Nuñez / Darren Acosta / Diego Ortiz	Paraguay	1:48.92

=== Women's C–1 200m ===
Rank	Name	Nation	Time
1st place, gold medalist(s)	María Mailliard	Chile	46.32
2nd place, silver medalist(s)	Manuela Gómez	Colombia	48.46
3rd place, bronze medalist(s)	Martina Vela	Argentina	49.10
4	Anggie Avegno	Ecuador	49.16
5	Cristy Barboza	Peru	1:03.93

=== Women's C–2 500m ===
Rank	Name	Nation	Time
1st place, gold medalist(s)	María Mailliard / Karen Roco	Chile	1:56.76
2nd place, silver medalist(s)	Manuela Gómez / Yurely Marín	Colombia	2:04.02
3rd place, bronze medalist(s)	Anggie Avegno / Neida Angulo	Ecuador	2:08.54
4	Martina Vela / Tais Trimarchi	Argentina	2:19.30

=== Women's K–1 200m ===
Rank	Name	Nation	Time
1st place, gold medalist(s)	Brenda Rojas	Argentina	41.03
2nd place, silver medalist(s)	Stefanie Perdomo	Ecuador	42.17
3rd place, bronze medalist(s)	Yocelin Canache	Venezuela	42.19
4	Ana Paula Vergutz	Brazil	42.39
5	Ysumy Orellana	Chile	42.48
6	Tatiana Muñoz	Colombia	43.45
7	Grecia Gomringer	Peru	53.87
8	Yasmin Rojas	Paraguay	1:03.84

=== Women's K–1 500m ===
Rank	Name	Nation	Time
1st place, gold medalist(s)	Brenda Rojas	Argentina	1:56.33
2nd place, silver medalist(s)	Ana Paula Vergutz	Brazil	1:58.90
3rd place, bronze medalist(s)	Mónica Hincapié	Colombia	2:01.53
4	Yocelin Canache	Venezuela	2:01.99
5	Ysumy Orellana	Chile	2:03.57
6	Stefanie Perdomo	Ecuador	2:04.63
7	Diana Gomringer	Peru	2:36.73

=== Women's K–2 500m ===
Rank	Name	Nation	Time
1st place, gold medalist(s)	Brenda Rojas / Magdalena Garro	Argentina	1:47.41
2nd place, silver medalist(s)	Diexe Molina / Tatiana Muñoz	Colombia	1:49.12
3rd place, bronze medalist(s)	Daniela Castillo / Jeanarett Valenzuela	Chile	1:51.19
4	Milenca Hernández / Yocelin Canache	Venezuela	1:54.05
5	Diana Gomringer / Grecia Gomringer	Peru	2:19.91
6	Arami Florentin / Yasmin Rojas	Paraguay	2:29.67

=== Women's K–4 1000m ===
Rank	Name	Nation	Time
1st place, gold medalist(s)	Candelaria Sequeira / Lucía Dalto / Paulina Contini / Sabrina Ameghino	Argentina	1:38.11
2nd place, silver medalist(s)	Diexe Molina / Karen Molina / Mónica Hincapié / Tatiana Muñoz	Colombia	1:39.61
3rd place, bronze medalist(s)	Daniela Castillo / Goviana Reyes / Jeanarett Valenzuela / Ysumy Orellana	Chile	1:40.08
4	Giomar Fernández / Mara Guerrero / Milenca Hernández / Yocelin Canache	Venezuela	1:41.08
5	Sara Lubian / Gabriela Páez / María Alejandra Montiel / María Elena López	Paraguay	2:21.38
