= Canoeing at the 2019 Pan American Games – Women's K-4 500 metres =

Women's K-4 500 metres at the 2019 Pan American Games
- Venue: Albufera Medio Mundo
- Dates: July 28
- Competitors: 32 from 8 nations
- Winning time: 1:34.316

Medalists
Gold medal	Andréanne Langlois; Alexa Irvin; Alanna Bray-Lougheed; Anna Negulic	Canada
Silver medal	Beatriz Briones; Karina Alanís; Brenda Gutierrez; Maricela Montemayor	Mexico
Bronze medal	Maria Garro; Micaela Maslein; Brenda Rojas; Sabrina Ameghino	Argentina

The Women's K-4 500 metres kayaking event at the 2019 Pan American Games was held on 28th of July at the Albufera Medio Mundo in the city of Huacho.

== Results ==
=== Final ===
Rank	Athletes	Country	Time
1st place, gold medalist(s)	Andréanne Langlois; Alexa Irvin; Alanna Bray-Lougheed; Anna Negulic	Canada	1:34.316
2nd place, silver medalist(s)	Beatriz Briones; Karina Alanís; Brenda Gutierrez; Maricela Montemayor	Mexico	1:34.646
3rd place, bronze medalist(s)	Maria Garro; Micaela Maslein; Brenda Rojas; Sabrina Ameghino	Argentina	1:35.606
4	Ysumy Orellana; Goviana Reyes; Fabiola Zamorano; Fernanda Iracheta	Chile	1:40.811
5	Samantha Barlow; Kaitlyn Mcelroy; Alina Urs; Renae Jackson	United States	1:41.988
6	Zulmarys Sánchez; Mara Guerrero; Eliana Escalona; Karla Patiño	Venezuela	1:45.223
7	Camila Cuello; Flavia López; Yurisledy Muñoz; Yurielky Montesino	Cuba	1:46.638
8	Grecia Gomringer; Diana Gomringer; Katherine Ccuno; Ariana Cruz	Peru	2:17.958
