= Canoeing at the 2019 Pan American Games – Women's K-2 500 metres =

Women's K-2 500 metres at the 2019 Pan American Games
- Venue: Albufera Medio Mundo
- Dates: July 29–30
- Competitors: 20 from 10 nations
- Winning time: 1:45.484

Medalists
Gold medal	Andréanne Langlois; Alanna Bray-Lougheed	Canada
Silver medal	Maria Garro; Brenda Rojas	Argentina
Bronze medal	Beatriz Briones; Karina Alanís	Mexico

The women's K-2 500 metres canoeing event at the 2019 Pan American Games was held between the 29 and 30 of July at the Albufera Medio Mundo in the city of Huacho.

== Results ==
=== Heats ===
Qualification Rules: 1..2->Final, Rest -> Semifinals

==== Heat 1 ====
Rank	Athletes	Country	Time	Notes
1	Andréanne Langlois; Alanna Bray-Lougheed	Canada	1:46.470	F
2	Samantha Barlow; Kaitlyn Mcelroy	United States	1:48.005	F
3	Yurisledy Muñoz; Flavia López	Cuba	1:48.125	SF
4	Mara Guerrero; Eliana Escalona	Venezuela	1:59.905	SF
5	Francisca Cruz; Ruth Cruz	Belize	2:35.585	SF

==== Heat 2 ====
Rank	Athletes	Country	Time	Notes
1	Maria Garro; Brenda Rojas	Argentina	1:46.644	F
2	Beatriz Briones; Karina Alanís	Mexico	1:49.309	F
3	Ysumy Orellana; Fabiola Zamorano	Chile	1:55.844	SF
4	Maoli Angulo; Tamya Rios	Ecuador	2:03.474	SF
5	Katherine Ccuno; Diana Gomringer	Peru	2:24.299	SF

=== Semifinal ===
Qualification Rules: 1..4->Final, Rest Out

Rank	Athletes	Country	Time	Notes
1	Yurisledy Muñoz; Flavia López	Cuba	1:50.183	F
2	Ysumy Orellana; Fabiola Zamorano	Chile	1:52.628	F
3	Mara Guerrero; Eliana Escalona	Venezuela	1:55.625	F
4	Maoli Angulo; Tamya Rios	Ecuador	1:56.170	F
5	Katherine Ccuno; Diana Gomringer	Peru	2:23.503	
6	Francisca Cruz; Ruth Cruz	Belize	2:33.900	

=== Final ===
Rank	Athletes	Country	Time	Notes
1st place, gold medalist(s)	Andréanne Langlois; Alanna Bray-Lougheed	Canada	1:45.484	
2nd place, silver medalist(s)	Maria Garro; Brenda Rojas	Argentina	1:46.932	
3rd place, bronze medalist(s)	Beatriz Briones; Karina Alanís	Mexico	1:47.472	
4	Samantha Barlow; Kaitlyn Mcelroy	United States	1:53.059	
5	Yurisledy Muñoz; Flavia López	Cuba	1:55.627	
6	Mara Guerrero; Eliana Escalona	Venezuela	1:56.684	
7	Ysumy Orellana; Fabiola Zamorano	Chile	1:57.214	
8	Maoli Angulo; Tamya Rios	Ecuador	1:59.142	
