= Canoeing at the 2023 Pan American Games – Women's K-1 500 metres =

Women's K-1 500 metres at the 2023 Pan American Games
- Venue: Laguna Grande
- Dates: November 1 and November 3
- Competitors: 15 from 14 nations
- Winning time: 1:51.25

Medalists
Gold medal	Michelle Russell	Canada
Silver medal	Brenda Rojas	Argentina
Bronze medal	Beatriz Briones	Mexico

The women's K-1 500 metres competition of the canoeing events at the 2023 Pan American Games was held on November 1 and 3 at the Laguna Grande in San Pedro de la Paz, Chile.

== Schedule ==
Date	Time	Round
November 1, 2023	09:00	Heats
November 1, 2023	11:00	Semifinals
November 3, 2023	09:00	Final

== Results ==
=== Heats ===
The best two score of each heat advance directly to the final, while the rest advance to the semifinals.

==== Heat 1 ====
Rank	Name	Nation	Time	Notes
1	Beatriz Briones	Mexico	1:56.06	FA
2	Kali Wilding	United States	1:57.28	FA
3	Ysumy Orellana	Chile	2:02.65	SFA
4	Stefanie Perdomo	Ecuador	2:03.95	SFB
5	Yocelin Canache	Venezuela	2:06.48	SFB
6	Nataly Gonzalez	Independent Athletes Team	2:14.09	SFA
7	Kyara Vargas	Peru	2:25.63	SFA
8	Diana Velasquez	Belize	2:42.77	SFB

==== Heat 2 ====
Rank	Name	Nation	Time	Notes
1	Michelle Russell	Canada	1:51.32	FA
2	Brenda Rojas	Argentina	1:51.60	FA
3	Yurieni Guerra	Cuba	1:55.11	SFB
4	Ana Paula Vergutz	Brazil	1:59.03	SFA
5	Mónica Hincapié	Colombia	2:04.14	SFA
6	Isabel Aburto	Mexico	2:06.03	SFB
7	Yasmin Rojas	Paraguay	2:34.38	SFB

=== Semifinals ===
The best four scores advance to the Final A, while the rest advance to the Final B.

==== Semifinal A ====
Rank	Name	Nation	Time	Notes
1	Ana Paula Vergutz	Brazil	2:00.00	FA
2	Ysumy Orellana	Chile	2:04.39	FA
3	Mónica Hincapié	Colombia	2:04.83	FB
4	Nataly Gonzalez	Independent Athletes Team	2:16.32	FB
5	Kyara Vargas	Peru	2:26.86	FB

==== Semifinal B ====
Rank	Name	Nation	Time	Notes
1	Yurieni Guerra	Cuba	1:59.15	FA
2	Isabel Aburto	Mexico	2:02.58	FA
3	Stefanie Perdomo	Ecuador	2:04.39	FB
4	Yocelin Canache	Venezuela	2:10.56	FB
5	Yasmin Rojas	Paraguay	2:41.06	FB
6	Diana Velasquez	Belize	2:53.71	FB

=== Finals ===
The results for the finals were as follows:

==== Final B ====
Rank	Name	Nation	Time	Notes
9	Stefanie Perdomo	Ecuador	2:01.68	
10	Yocelin Canache	Venezuela	2:04.32	
11	Mónica Hincapié	Colombia	2:04.41	
12	Nataly Gonzalez	Independent Athletes Team	2:16.55	
13	Kyara Vargas	Peru	2:25.84	
14	Yasmin Rojas	Paraguay	2:32.69	
15	Diana Velasquez	Belize	2:41.29	

==== Final A ====
Rank	Name	Nation	Time	Notes
1st place, gold medalist(s)	Michelle Russell	Canada	1:51.25	
2nd place, silver medalist(s)	Brenda Rojas	Argentina	1:52.01	
3rd place, bronze medalist(s)	Beatriz Briones	Mexico	1:53.07	
4	Yurieni Guerra	Cuba	1:55.04	
5	Ana Paula Vergutz	Brazil	1:55.41	
6	Kali Wilding	United States	1:57.64	
7	Isabel Aburto	Mexico	2:01.01	
8	Ysumy Orellana	Chile	2:02.37	
