= Canoeing at the 2023 Pan American Games – Men's kayak cross =

Men's kayak cross at the 2023 Pan American Games
- Venue: Aconcagua River
- Dates: October 27, October 29
- Competitors: 16 from 9 nations

Medalists
Gold medal	Guilherme Mapelli	Brazil
Silver medal	Alex Baldoni	Canada
Bronze medal	Eriberto Gutiérrez	Peru

The men's kayak cross competition of the canoeing events at the 2023 Pan American Games was held on October 27 and 29 at the Aconcagua River in Los Andes, Chile.

== Schedule ==
Date	Time	Round
October 27, 2023	09:30	Time Trial
October 29, 2023	14:30	Semi-final
October 29, 2023	15:50	Final

== Results ==
The eight best times during the time trial advance to the semifinals, though only one athlete for NOC could advance. The best two times of each of the two semifinals advance to the final, where the medals are determined.

=== Time trial ===
Rank	Name	Nation	Time	Notes
1	Alex Baldoni	Canada	49.74	Q
2	Guilherme Mapelli	Brazil	50.70	Q
3	Kyler Long	United States	50.90	Q
4	Maël Rivard	Canada	51.46	
5	Kilian Ivelic	Chile	51.51	Q
6	Pepe Gonçalves	Brazil	51.52	
7	Andraz Echeverría	Chile	51.79	
8	Matías Contreras	Argentina	52.00	Q
9	Kauã da Silva	Brazil	52.67	
10	Alexis Pérez	Venezuela	53.70	Q
11	Joshua Joseph	United States	53.75	
12	Antonio Reinoso	Mexico	54.70	Q
13	Eriberto Gutiérrez	Peru	58.55	Q
14	Fernando Reinoso	Mexico	61.61	
15	John Hunter Rodríguez	Peru	64.59	
16	Soloman Maragh	Jamaica	DNS	

=== Semifinals ===
Heat	Rank	Name	Nation	Notes
1	1	Alex Baldoni	Canada	Q
1	2	Eriberto Gutiérrez	Peru	Q
1	3	Matías Contreras	Argentina	
1	4	Kilian Ivelic	Chile	
2	1	Guilherme Mapelli	Brazil	Q
2	2	Antonio Reinoso	Mexico	Q
2	3	Alexis Pérez	Venezuela	
2	4	Kyler Long	United States	

=== Final ===
Rank	Name	Nation	Notes
1st place, gold medalist(s)	Guilherme Mapelli	Brazil	
2nd place, silver medalist(s)	Alex Baldoni	Canada	
3rd place, bronze medalist(s)	Eriberto Gutiérrez	Peru	
4	Antonio Reinoso	Mexico	
