= Canoeing at the 2013 Canada Summer Games =

Canoeing at the 2013 Canada Summer Games was in Sherbrooke, Quebec at Lac des Nations. It was held from the 13 to 17 August. There were 21 events of canoeing and kayaking.

== Medal table ==
The following is the medal table for sprint canoeing at the 2013 Canada Summer Games.

* Host nation ( Quebec)

Rank	Nation	Gold	Silver	Bronze	Total
1	Ontario	12	9	6	27
2	Quebec*	10	10	10	30
3	Nova Scotia	9	12	6	27
4	Saskatchewan	2	3	3	8
5	British Columbia	1	1	3	5
6	Manitoba	1	0	5	6
7	Alberta	1	0	2	3
Totals (7 entries)		36	35	35	106

== Men's ==
=== Canoeing ===
Event	Gold		Silver		Bronze	
C-1 200 m	Maxim Poulin; Quebec	45.130	Tom Hall; Nova Scotia	46.410	Keiffer Johnson; British Columbia	47.210
C-1 500 m	Michael Lussier-Rashotte; Quebec	2:11.150	Lukas Hetzler; Nova Scotia	2:12.910	Tom Sherwin; Manitoba	2:14.280
C-1 1,000 m	Craig Spence; Nova Scotia	4:24.390	Drew Hodges; Ontario	4:27.800	Tom Sherwin; Manitoba	4:32.120
C-1 5,000 m	Drew Hodges; Ontario	24:50.230	Craig Spence; Nova Scotia	25:12.310	Tom Sherwin; Manitoba	25:16.830
C-2 200 m	Quebec; Jean-Félix Brouillette; Maxim Poulin	44.140	Nova Scotia; Peter Lombardi; Tom Hall	45.550	Ontario; Brendan Fowler; Josh Havin	46.480
C-2 1,000 m	Ontario; Evan Bezemer; Jeremy Stott	4:20.190	Quebec; Jean-Félix Brouillette; Maxim Poulin	4:24.770	British Columbia; Keiffer Johnson; Zach Morgan	4:31.170
C-2 5,000 m	Ontario; Evan Bezemer; Jeremy Stott	23:14.770	Quebec; Thomas Markhauser; Julien Vermette	23:57.180	Nova Scotia; Peter Lombardi; Tom Miller	24:11.420
IC-4 200 m	Quebec; Jean-Félix Brouillette; Michael Lussier-Rashotte; Thomas Markhauser; Maxim Poulin	39.100	Nova Scotia; Tom Hall; Lukas Hetzler; Peter Lombardi; Tom Miller	39.230	Ontario; Evan Bezemer; Josh Havin; Drew Hodges; Jeremy Stott	41.990
IC-4 1,000 m	Nova Scotia; Tom Hall; Lukas Hetzler; Peter Lombardi; Tom Miller	3:42.100	Ontario; Brendan Fowler; Josh Havin; Drew Hodges; Jeremy Stott	3:43.700	Quebec; Jean-Félix Brouillette; Michael Lussier-Rashotte; Thomas Markhauser; Julien Vermette	3:47.600

=== Kayaking ===
Event	Gold		Silver		Bronze	
K-1 200 m	Pierre-Luc Poulin; Quebec	38.920	Mykel Kowaluk; Saskatchewan	40.030	Andrew Gardiner; Nova Scotia	40.760
K-1 500 m	Pierre-Luc Poulin; Quebec	1:53.570	Brian Malfesi; British Columbia	1:55.040	Nick Robson; Ontario	1:56.040
K-1 1,000 m	Brian Malfesi; British Columbia	3:51.530	Marshall Hughes; Nova Scotia	3:54.170	Ben Kendall; Alberta	3:55.490
K-1 5,000 m	Ben Kendall; Alberta	21:56.770	Alex Tessier; Quebec	22:06.900	Jarret Kenke; Saskatchewan	22:11.200
K-2 200 m	Quebec; Pierre-Luc Poulin; Nicolas Racine	37.460	Saskatchewan; Jarret Kenke; Mykel Kowaluk	38.800	British Columbia; Patrick Dann; Brian Malfesi	39.700
K-2 1,000 m	Saskatchewan; Jarret Kenke; Mykel Kowaluk	3:42.070	Quebec; Zacharie Cameron; Alex Tessier	3:44.460	Alberta; Austin Beever; Ben Kendall	3:45.260
K-2 5,000 m	Ontario; Keir Johnson; Nigel Rockett	20:44.850	Saskatchewan; Simon Fense; Fearghus Vincent	20:55.020	Quebec; Zacharie Cameron; Olivier Therrien	21:08.400
K-4 200 m	Saskatchewan; Simon Fense; Jarret Kenke; Mykel Kowaluk; Liam McKinnon	35.620	Quebec; Pierre-Luc Poulin; Nicolas Racine; Alex Tessier; Olivier Therrien	36.220	Ontario; Scott Barclay; Eric Ellery; Keir Johnston; Nigel Rockett	36.430
K-4 1,000 m	Nova Scotia; Zane Clarke; Marshall Hughes; Jeremy Mock; Adam Tenwolde	3:16.040	Ontario; Eric Ellery; Keir Johnston; Nick Robson; Nigel Rockett	3:16.110	Saskatchewan; Simon Fense; Jarret Kenke; Mykel Kowaluk; Liam McKinnon	3:17.640

== Women's ==
=== Canoeing ===
Event	Gold		Silver		Bronze	
C-1 200 m	Taylor Potts; Ontario	53.050	Sarah-Jane Caumartin; Quebec	54.410	Emily Riddle; Nova Scotia	55.340
C-1 500 m	Taylor Potts; Ontario	2:32.770	Sarah-Jane Caumartin; Quebec	2:35.910	Hannah MacIntosh; Nova Scotia	2:40.490
C-1 1,000 m	Katie Vincent; Ontario	5:12.960	Sarah-Jane Caumartin; Quebec	5:23.570	Hannah MacIntosh; Nova Scotia	5:26.820
C-1 5,000 m	Katie Vincent; Ontario	29:45.430	Emily Riddle; Nova Scotia	30:06.760	Hannah Guttormson; Manitoba	30:14.730
C-2 200 m	Nova Scotia; Mariah Godin; Hannah MacIntosh	53.950	Ontario; Abigail Haines; Taylor Potts	54.770	Quebec; Sarah-Jane Caumartin; Joannie Verret	56.560
C-2 500 m	Ontario; Megan Sibthorpe; Katie Vincent	2:24.520	Nova Scotia; Mariah Godin; Nicole Jessop	2:29.900	Manitoba; Hannah Guttormson; Stephanie Lowrie	2:30.250
C-2 5,000 m	Manitoba; Hannah Guttormson; Stephanie Lowrie	27:12.690	Ontario; Megan Sibthorpe; Jillian Perrone	27:32.670	Quebec; Sarah-Jane Caumartin; Joannie Verret	28:10.060
IC-4 200 m	Ontario; Abigail Haines; Taylor Potts; Megan Sibthorpe; Katie Vincent	48.740	Nova Scotia; Mariah Godin; Hannah MacIntosh; Dia Orengo; Emily Riddle	50.120	Quebec; Juliette Brault; Sarah-Jane Caumartin; Florence L'Abbé; Joannie Verret	52.060
IC-4 500 m	Ontario; Abigail Haines; Jillian Perrone; Megan Sibthorpe; Katie Vincent	2:18.490	Quebec; Juliette Brault; Sarah-Jane Caumartin; Florence L'Abbé; Joannie Verret	2:21.120	Nova Scotia; Mariah Godin; Nicole Jessop; Dia Orengo; Emily Riddle	2:24.230

=== Kayaking ===
Event	Gold		Silver		Bronze	
K-1 200 m	Jessica Leduc; Quebec	44.030	Ailish McNulty; Nova Scotia	44.900	Alanna Bray-Lougheed; Ontario	45.220
K-1 500 m	Madeline Schmidt; Ontario	2:10.280	Sam Hall; Nova Scotia	2:10.610	Andréanne Langlois; Quebec	2:11.190
K-1 1,000 m	Sam Hall; Nova Scotia	4:25.570	Sarah Dubois; Quebec	4:31.140	Lexy Vincent; Saskatchewan	4:33.130
K-1 5,000 m	Anna Hetzler; Nova Scotia	24:45.160	Alexandra Joy; Ontario	24:45.980	Émilie Simard; Quebec	25:08.230
K-2 200 m	Quebec; Andréanne Langlois; Jessica Leduc		Ontario; Natalie Davison; Madeline Schmidt		Nova Scotia; Olivia Denman; Liz Girgulis	
K-2 500 m	Nova Scotia; Anna Hetzler; Ailish McNulty	2:00.220	Ontario; Alanna Bray-Lougheed; Courtney Stott	2:02.170	Quebec; Ariane Cyr; Marie-Justine Lord	2:05.370
K-2 5,000 m	Nova Scotia; Liz Girgulis; Sam Hall	22:23.900	Ontario; Madeline Schmidt; Courtney Stott	22:25.460	Quebec; Ariane Cyr; Sarah Dubois	23:36.670
K-4 200 m	Nova Scotia; Olivia Denman; Liz Girgulis; Anna Hetzler; Ailish McNulty	40.900	Ontario; Alanna Bray-Lougheed; Natalie Davison; Madeline Claire Schmidt; Courtney Stott	41.670	Quebec; Andréanne Langlois; Jessica Leduc; Marie-Justine Lord; Sarah Dubois	41.880
K-4 500 m	Quebec; Andréanne Langlois; Jessica Leduc; Émilie Simard; Sarah Dubois	1:50.200	Nova Scotia; Liz Girgulis; Sam Hall; Anna Hetzler; Ailish McNulty	1:51.780	Ontario; Alanna Bray-Lougheed; Alexandra Joy; Madeline Claire Schmidt; Courtney Stott	1:55.830
