= Belize at the 2023 Pan American Games =

- IOC code: BIZ
- NOC: Belize Olympic and Commonwealth Games Association

in Santiago, Chile 20 October 2023 – 5 November 2023
- Competitors: 6 in 3 sports
- Flag bearers (opening): Trent Hardwick & Ashantie Carr
- Flag bearers (closing): Trent Hardwick & Ashantie Carr
- Medals: Gold 0 Silver 0 Bronze 0 Total 0

Pan American Games appearances (overview)
- 1967; 1971; 1975; 1979; 1983; 1987; 1991; 1995; 1999; 2003; 2007; 2011; 2015; 2019; 2023

Belize is scheduled to compete at the 2023 Pan American Games in Santiago, Chile from October 20 to November 5, 2023. This will be Belize's 15th appearance at the Pan American Games, having competed at every edition of the Games since 1967.

The Belizean team consisted of six athletes competing in three sports. Sailor Trent Hardwick and track and field athlete Ashantie Carr were the country's flagbearers during the opening ceremony. The pair were also the country's flagbearers during the closing ceremony.

== Competitors ==
The following is the list of number of competitors (per gender) participating at the games per sport/discipline.

Sport	Men	Women	Total
Athletics (track and field)	1	1	2
Canoeing	1	2	3
Sailing	1	0	1
Total	3	3	6

== Athletics (track and field) ==
Belize entered two athletes.

Key

- Note–Ranks given for track events are within the athlete's heat only
- Q = Qualified for the next round
- q = Qualified for the next round as a fastest loser
- Bye = Athlete not required to compete in round

Field events

Athlete	Event	Final	
Athlete	Event	Distance	Position
Brandon Jones	Men's triple jump	14.47	9
Ashantie Carr	Women's long jump	5.89	8

== Canoeing ==
=== Sprint ===
Belize qualified a total of three sprint athletes (one man and two women).

Athlete	Event	Heat		Semifinal		Final	
Athlete	Event	Time	Rank	Time	Rank	Time	Rank
Amado Cruz	Men's K-1 1000 m	3:58.58	5 SF	3:56.51	3 FB	3:51.69	9
Diana Velásquez	Women's K-1 500 m	2:42.77	8 SF	2:53.71	6 FB	2:41.29	15
Diana Velásquez; Avis Guydis	Women's K-2 500 m	2:43.71	5 SF	2:43.06	6 FB	2:36.07	10

== Sailing ==
Belize received one universality spot, in the laser event. This will mark the country's Pan American Games debut in the sport.

Men

Athlete	Event	Opening series												Finals		
Athlete	Event	1	2	3	4	5	6	7	8	9	10	Points	Rank	M	Points	Rank
Trent Hardwick	Laser	22	18	19	22	21	~~23~~; ~~RET~~	21	22	19	20	184	22	Did not advance		

== See also ==
- Belize at the 2024 Summer Olympics
