= Belize at the 2019 Pan American Games =

- IOC code: BIZ
- NOC: Belize Olympic and Commonwealth Games Association

in Lima, Peru 26 July–11 August 2019
- Competitors: 6 in 4 sports
- Flag bearer: Jordan Santos (opening)
- Medals: Gold 0 Silver 0 Bronze 0 Total 0

Pan American Games appearances (overview)
- 1967; 1971; 1975; 1979; 1983; 1987; 1991; 1995; 1999; 2003; 2007; 2011; 2015; 2019; 2023

Belize competed in the 2019 Pan American Games in Lima, Peru from July 26 to August 11, 2019.

On July 19, 2019, the Belize team of six athletes (three per gender) was announced. Triathlete Jordan Santos was the country's flag bearer during the opening ceremony.

== Competitors ==
The following is the list of number of competitors (per gender) participating at the games per sport/discipline.

Sport	Men	Women	Total
Athletics (track and field)	0	1	1
Bodybuilding	1	0	1
Canoeing	1	2	3
Triathlon	1	0	1
Total	3	3	6

== Athletics (track and field) ==
Belize received one wild card to enter one woman in the 100 metres event.

Key

- Note–Ranks given for track events are for the entire round

Track event
Women

Athlete	Event	Semifinals		Final	
Athlete	Event	Result	Rank	Result	Rank
Hilary Gladden	100 m	12.19	19	did not advance	

== Bodybuilding ==
Belize qualified one male bodybuilder.

Men

Athlete	Event	Prejudging		Final	
Athlete	Event	Result	Rank	Result	Rank
Godfrey Alford	Classic bodybuilding	—N/a		did not advance	

- No results were provided for the prejudging round, with only the top six advancing.

== Canoeing ==
Belize qualified two canoe sprint athletes (one male and one female). Belize was later reallocated an additional female quota.

=== Sprint ===
Athlete	Event	Heats		Semifinal		Final	
Athlete	Event	Time	Rank	Time	Rank	Time	Rank
Amado Cruz	Men's K-1 200 metres	39.371	7 SF	39.083	6	did not advance	
Amado Cruz	Men's K-1 1000 metres	3.48.139	5 SF	3:57.633	6	did not advance	
Ruth Cruz	Women's K-1 200 metres	1:11.448	6 SF	1:08.216	8	did not advance	
Francisca Cruz	Women's K-1 500 metres	2.41.278	6 SF	2:37.758	8	did not advance	
Francisca Cruz; Ruth Cruz	Women's K-2 500 metres	2:35.585	5 SF	2:33.900	6	did not advance	

Qualification Legend: F = Qualify to final (medal); SF = Qualify to semifinal. Position is within the heat

== Triathlon ==
Belize received a wild card to enter one male triathlete.

Men

Athlete	Event	Swim (1.5 km)	Trans 1	Bike (40 km)	Trans 2	Run (8.88 km)	Total	Rank
Jordan Santos	Individual	Lapped						
