= Canoeing at the 2019 Pan American Games =

- Canoeing pictograms
- Venues: Rio Canete (slalom); Albufera Medio Mundo (sprint)
- Dates: July 27–30 (sprint); August 2–4 (slalom)
- Competitors: 169

Canoeing competitions at the 2019 Pan American Games in Lima, Peru, are scheduled to be held at the Rio Canete located in the city of Lunahuaná (slalom) and Albufera Medio Mundo in the city of Huacho (sprint).

The sprint competitions will start on July 27 and finish on the 30th, while slalom will start on the August 2nd and finish on the 4th.

In 2016, the International Olympic Committee (IOC) made several changes to its sports program, which were subsequently implemented for these games. Included in this was the addition of the women's C2 500 metres event in sprint (the women's C1 200 metres event was also added to the Olympics but was already contested at the Toronto 2015 Pan American Games). This also meant the removal of two men's events in sprint (C1 200 and K2 200). Also added to the Pan American Games program was the addition of two extreme (head-to-head) slalom kayak events.

18 medal events are scheduled to be contested, 12 in sprint (six per gender) and six in slalom (three per gender).

== Medal table ==
* Host nation (Peru)

| Rank | Nation | Gold | Silver | Bronze | Total |
|---|---|---|---|---|---|
| 1 | Brazil | 5 | 0 | 3 | 8 |
| 2 | Argentina | 4 | 4 | 2 | 10 |
| 3 | Canada | 3 | 6 | 4 | 13 |
| 4 | United States | 3 | 2 | 1 | 6 |
| 5 | Cuba | 2 | 2 | 1 | 5 |
| 6 | Mexico | 1 | 1 | 7 | 9 |
| 7 | Chile | 0 | 2 | 0 | 2 |
| 8 | Ecuador | 0 | 1 | 0 | 1 |
| Totals (8 entries) | | 18 | 18 | 18 | 54 |

== Medalists ==
=== Slalom ===
| Event | Gold | Silver | Bronze |
|---|---|---|---|
| Men's C-1 | Zachary Lokken; United States | Sebastián Rossi; Argentina | Felipe Borges; Brazil |
| Women's C-1 | Ana Sátila; Brazil | Lois Betteridge; Canada | Michaela Corcoran; United States |
| Men's K-1 | Pedro Gonçalves; Brazil | Lucas Rossi; Argentina | Keenan Simpson; Canada |
| Women's K-1 | Evy Leibfarth; United States | Nadia Riquelme; Argentina | Sofía Reinoso; Mexico |
| Men's extreme K-1 | Pedro Gonçalves; Brazil | Joshua Joseph; United States | Keenan Simpson; Canada |
| Women's extreme K-1 | Ana Sátila; Brazil | Evy Leibfarth; United States | Sofía Reinoso; Mexico |

=== Sprint ===
Men

| Event | Gold | Silver | Bronze |
|---|---|---|---|
| Men's C-1 1000 m | Isaquias Queiroz; Brazil | Fernando Jorge; Cuba | Drew Hodges; Canada |
| Men's C-2 1000 m | Cuba; Serguey Torres; Fernando Jorge | Canada; Craig Spence; Drew Hodges | Mexico; Guillermo Quirino; Rigoberto Camilo |
| Men's K-1 200 m | Dominik Crête; Canada | César de Cesare; Ecuador | Rubén Rézola; Argentina |
| Men's K-1 1000 m | Agustín Vernice; Argentina | Marshall Hughes; Canada | Vagner Souta; Brazil |
| Men's K-2 1000 m | Argentina; Manuel Lascano; Agustín Vernice | Canada; Jacob Steele; Jarret Kenke | Mexico; Oabaldo Fuentes; Mauricio Figueroa |
| Men's K-4 500 m | Argentina; Manuel Lascano; Juan Ignacio Cáceres; Ezequiel Di Giacomo; Gonzalo Carreras | Cuba; Reinier Carrera; Renier Mora; Robert Benítez; Fidel Antonio Vargas | Mexico; Javier López; Juan Rodríguez; Mauricio Figueroa; Osbaldo Fuentes |

Women

| Event | Gold | Silver | Bronze |
|---|---|---|---|
| Women's C-1 200 m | Nevin Harrison; United States | María Mailliard; Chile | Mayvihanet Borges; Cuba |
| Women's C-2 500 m | Cuba; Mayvihanet Borges; Katherin Nuevo | Chile; Karen Roco; María Mailliard | Canada; Anne Lavoie-Parent; Rowan Hardy-Kavanagh |
| Women's K-1 200 m | Sabrina Ameghino; Argentina | Andréanne Langlois; Canada | Beatriz Briones; Mexico |
| Women's K-1 500 m | Beatriz Briones; Mexico | Andréanne Langlois; Canada | Ana Paula Vergutz; Brazil |
| Women's K-2 500 m | Canada; Andréanne Langlois; Alanna Bray-Lougheed | Argentina; María Garro; Brenda Rojas | Mexico; Beatriz Briones; Karina Alanís |
| Women's K-4 500 m | Canada; Andréanne Langlois; Alexa Irvin; Alanna Bray-Lougheed; Anna Negulic | Mexico; Beatriz Briones; Karina Alanís; Brenda Gutiérrez; Maricela Montemayor | Argentina; María Garro; Micaela Maslein; Brenda Rojas; Sabrina Ameghino |

== Qualification ==
A total of 169 canoe and kayak athletes will qualify to compete. 125 will qualify in sprint (60 per gender plus five wild cards) and 44 in canoe slalom (22 per gender). The host nation (Peru) is guaranteed two quotas in the slalom events and it must qualify in sprint. A nation may enter a maximum of 6 athletes in slalom (three per gender) and 16 in sprint.

== See also ==
- Canoeing at the 2020 Summer Olympics
