= Canoeing at the 2019 Pan American Games – Women's K-1 500 metres =

Women's K-1 500 metres at the 2019 Pan American Games
- Venue: Albufera Medio Mundo
- Dates: July 27-29
- Competitors: 12 from 12 nations
- Winning time: 1:52.552

Medalists
Gold medal	Beatriz Briones	Mexico
Silver medal	Andréanne Langlois	Canada
Bronze medal	Ana Paula Vergutz	Brazil

The women's K-1 500 metres canoeing event at the 2019 Pan American Games was held between the 27 and 29 of July at the Albufera Medio Mundo in the city of Huacho.

== Results ==
=== Heats ===
Qualification Rules: 1..2->Final, 3..6->Semifinals, Rest Out

==== Heat 1 ====
Rank	Athletes	Country	Time	Notes
1	Andréanne Langlois	Canada	1.54.528	F
2	Beatriz Briones	Mexico	1.56.328	F
3	Paulina Contini	Argentina	2.05.926	SF
4	Maoli Angulo	Ecuador	2.11.128	SF
5	Eliana Escalona	Venezuela	2.11.143	SF
6	Francisca Cruz	Belize	2.41.278	SF

==== Heat 2 ====
Rank	Athletes	Country	Time	Notes
1	Ana Paula Vergutz	Brazil	1.57.295	F
2	Elena Wolgamot	United States	1.59.785	F
3	Ysumy Orellana	Chile	2.00.722	SF
4	Yurisledy Muñoz	Cuba	2.09.382	SF
5	Andrea Curbelo	Puerto Rico	2.18.017	SF
6	Ariana Cruz	Peru	2.31.225	SF

=== Semifinal ===
Qualification Rules: 1..4->Final, Rest Out

Rank	Athletes	Country	Time	Notes
1	Ysumy Orellana	Chile	2:00.283	F
2	Paulina Contini	Argentina	2:01.413	F
3	Yurisledy Muñoz	Cuba	2:01.661	F
4	Maoli Angulo	Ecuador	2:06.088	F
5	Eliana Escalona	Venezuela	2:08.721	
6	Andrea Curbelo	Puerto Rico	2:15.226	
7	Ariana Cruz	Peru	2:29.348	
8	Francisca Cruz	Belize	2:37.758	

=== Final ===
Rank	Athletes	Country	Time	Notes
1st place, gold medalist(s)	Beatriz Briones	Mexico	1:52.552	
2nd place, silver medalist(s)	Andréanne Langlois	Canada	1:53.332	
3rd place, bronze medalist(s)	Ana Paula Vergutz	Brazil	1:54.294	
4	Elena Wolgamot	United States	1:58.409	
5	Ysumy Orellana	Chile	1:59.714	
6	Paulina Contini	Argentina	2:01.947	
7	Yurisledy Muñoz	Cuba	2:06.252	
8	Maoli Angulo	Ecuador	2:07.239	
