= Canoeing at the 2023 Pan American Games – Women's K-2 500 metres =

Women's K-2 500 metres at the 2023 Pan American Games
- Venue: Laguna Grande
- Dates: November 2 and November 4
- Competitors: 20 from 10 nations
- Winning time: 1:41.98

Medalists
Gold medal	Karina Alanís; Beatriz Briones	Mexico
Silver medal	Brenda Rojas; Magdalena Garro	Argentina
Bronze medal	Courtney Stott; Madeline Schmidt	Canada

The women's K-2 500 metres competition of the canoeing events at the 2023 Pan American Games was held on November 1 and 3 at the Laguna Grande in San Pedro de la Paz, Chile.

== Schedule ==
Date	Time	Round
November 2, 2023	09:45	Heats
November 2, 2023	11:55	Semifinals
November 4, 2023	09:50	Final

== Results ==
=== Heats ===
The best two score of each heat advance directly to the Final A, while the rest advance to the semifinal.

==== Heat 1 ====
Rank	Name	Nation	Time	Notes
1	Daylen Rodríguez; Yurieni Guerra	Cuba	1:45.51	FA
2	Courtney Stott; Madeline Schmidt	Canada	1:46.19	FA
3	Elena Wolgamot; Katriana Swetish	United States	1:51.94	SF
4	Diexe Molina; Tatiana Muñoz	Colombia	1:55.60	SF
5	Diana Velasquez; Avis Guydis	Belize	2:43.71	SF

==== Heat 2 ====
Rank	Name	Nation	Time	Notes
1	Brenda Rojas; Magdalena Garro	Argentina	1:45.56	FA
2	Karina Alanís; Beatriz Briones	Mexico	1:45.86	FA
3	Mara Guerrero; Yocelin Canache	Venezuela	1:56.19	SF
4	Fernanda Iracheta; Maira Toro	Chile	1:57.87	SF
5	Kyara Vargas; Diana Gomringer	Peru	2:19.48	SF

=== Semifinals ===
The best four scores advance to the Final A, while the rest advance to the Final B.

Rank	Name	Nation	Time	Notes
1	Diexe Molina; Tatiana Muñoz	Colombia	1:50.93	FA
2	Elena Wolgamot; Katriana Swetish	United States	1:51.15	FA
3	Fernanda Iracheta; Maira Toro	Chile	1:58.63	FA
4	Mara Guerrero; Yocelin Canache	Venezuela	2:01.08	FA
5	Kyara Vargas; Diana Gomringer	Peru	2:18.59	FB
6	Diana Velasquez; Avis Guydis	Belize	2:43.06	FB

=== Final ===
The results for the finals were as follows:

==== Final B ====
Rank	Name	Nation	Time	Notes
9	Kyara Vargas; Diana Gomringer	Peru	2:11.33	
10	Diana Velasquez; Avis Guydis	Belize	2:36.07	

==== Final A ====
Rank	Name	Nation	Time	Notes
1st place, gold medalist(s)	Karina Alanís; Beatriz Briones	Mexico	1:41.98	
2nd place, silver medalist(s)	Brenda Rojas; Magdalena Garro	Argentina	1:42.45	
3rd place, bronze medalist(s)	Courtney Stott; Madeline Schmidt	Canada	1:42.84	
4	Daylen Rodríguez; Yurieni Guerra	Cuba	1:43.27	
5	Diexe Molina; Tatiana Muñoz	Colombia	1:46.25	
6	Elena Wolgamot; Katriana Swetish	United States	1:48.23	
7	Mara Guerrero; Yocelin Canache	Venezuela	1:50.48	
8	Fernanda Iracheta; Maira Toro	Chile	1:52.10	
