= Canoeing at the 2023 Pan American Games – Men's slalom K-1 =

Men's slalom K-1 at the 2023 Pan American Games
- Venue: Aconcagua River
- Dates: October 28 – October 29
- Winning time: 91.12

Medalists
Gold medal	Joshua Joseph	United States
Silver medal	Pepe Gonçalves	Brazil
Bronze medal	Mael Rivard	Canada

The men's slalom k-1 competition of the canoeing events at the 2023 Pan American Games was held from October 28 to 29 at the Aconcagua River in Los Andes, Chile.

== Schedule ==
Date	Time	Round
October 28, 2023	10:14	Heats
October 29, 2023	10:44	Semi-final
October 29, 2023	11:50	Final

== Results ==
The seven best times advance to the semi-finals. From there, the best six times advance to the final, where the medals are determined.

Rank	Name	Preliminary Heats						Semifinal			Final	
Rank	Name	1st Ride	Pen.	2nd Ride	Pen.	Best	Rank	Time	Pen.	Rank	Time	Pen.
1st place, gold medalist(s)	Joshua Joseph (USA)	77.35	0	77.64	0	77.35	3	139.81	50	6	91.12	2
2nd place, silver medalist(s)	Pepe Gonçalves (BRA)	75.35	0	74.90	0	75.90	1	93.53	2	1	94.08	6
3rd place, bronze medalist(s)	Mael Rivard (CAN)	79.90	0	89.52	2	79.90	4	99.97	4	4	99.56	6
4	Andraz Echeverría (CHI)	130.83	52	81.85	2	81.85	6	95.65	6	2	100.03	8
5	Antonio Reinoso (MEX)	81.73	0	86.02	2	81.73	5	103.51	2	5	104.50	4
6	Alexis Pérez (VEN)	84.36	0	89.75	4	84.36	7	98.60	0	3	170.20	60
7	Lucas Rossi (ARG)	79.71	4	76.59	0	76.59	2	141.70	52	7	did not advance	
8	Eriberto Gutiérrez (PER)	88.33	2	89.74	4	88.33	8	did not advance				
9	Soloman Maragh (JAM)	DNS				DNS	9	did not advance				
