= Canoeing at the 2010 South American Games – Women's K-4 200 metres =

The Women's K-4 200m event at the 2010 South American Games was held over March 29 at 11:00.

== Medalists ==
Gold	Silver	Bronze
Daniela Alvarez; Juliana Domingos; Naiane Pereira; Ariela Pinto; Brazil	Natalin Fontanini; Maria Magdalena Garro; Maria Fernanda Lauro; Maria Cecilia Collueque; Argentina	Aura María Ospina; Tatiana Muñoz; Ruth Niño; Ivonne Fonseca; Colombia

== Results ==
Rank	Athlete	Time
1st place, gold medalist(s)	Brazil; Daniela Alvarez; Juliana Domingos; Naiane Pereira; Ariela Pinto	39.65
2nd place, silver medalist(s)	Argentina; Natalin Fontanini; Maria Magdalena Garro; Maria Fernanda Lauro; Maria Cecilia Collueque	40.30
3rd place, bronze medalist(s)	Colombia; Aura María Ospina; Tatiana Muñoz; Ruth Niño; Ivonne Fonseca	40.92
4	Venezuela; Eliana Escalona; Givanny Ramos; Andreina Silva; Vanessa Yorsel Silva	41.23
5	Chile; Barbara Alejandra Gomez; Ysumy Omayra Trigo; Yanara Alejandra Santander; Fabiola Alejandra Pavez	41.57
