= Canoeing at the 2010 South American Games – Women's K-2 200 metres =

2010 South American Games Canoeing Event

The Women's K-2 200m event at the 2010 South American Games was held over March 29 at 10:00.

== Medalists ==
Gold	Silver	Bronze
Juliana Domingos; Naiane Pereira; Brazil	Maria Fernanda Lauro; Maria Magdalena Garro; Argentina	Aura María Ospina; Tatiana Muñoz; Colombia

== Results ==
Rank	Athlete	Time
1st place, gold medalist(s)	Brazil; Juliana Domingos; Naiane Pereira	43.15
2nd place, silver medalist(s)	Argentina; Maria Magdalena Garro; Maria Fernanda Lauro	43.76
3rd place, bronze medalist(s)	Colombia; Aura María Ospina; Tatiana Muñoz	44.61
4	Chile; Ysumy Omayra Trigo; Fabiola Alejandra Pavez	44.95
5	Venezuela; Eliana Escalona; Yuleidis Coromoto Ramos	45.38
