= Canoeing at the 2026 South American Games =

Canoeing competitions at the 2026 South American Games

- Venue: Costanera Este (sprint); Lago Sur (slalom)
- Dates: September 23–25

Canoeing competitions at the 2026 South American Games in Rosario, Santa Fe, and Rafaela, Argentina, are scheduled to be held between September 23 and 25. The sprint events will take place at Costanera Este in Laguna Setúbal while the slalom events will be held at Lago Sur in Parque del Sur; both venues are located in Santa Fe.

A total of 24 events will be contested: 16 sprint events (seven men's, seven women's and two mixed) and 8 slalom (four men's and four women's). Two mixed sprint and two individual time trial kayak events were added. The games will give twelve qualifying quotas for the sprint events from the 2027 Pan American Games canoeing competitions.

== Medal summary ==
=== Medal table ===
* Host nation (Argentina)

Rank	Nation	Gold	Silver	Bronze	Total
1	Argentina*	11	3	6	20
2	Brazil	7	9	2	18
3	Chile	5	4	5	14
4	Uruguay	1	4	1	6
5	Colombia	0	1	5	6
6	Venezuela	0	1	3	4
7	Paraguay	0	1	0	1
7	Peru	0	1	0	1
9	Ecuador	0	0	2	2
Totals (9 entries)		24	24	24	72

=== Medalists ===
==== Slalom ====
Event	Gold	Silver	Bronze
Men's C-1 parallel slalom	Manuel Trípano; Argentina	Joachim Berthelot; Peru	Charles Corrêa; Brazil
Women's C-1 parallel slalom	Beatriz Da Motta; Brazil	Ana Fernandes; Paraguay	Iris Castiglione; Argentina
Men's K-1 parallel slalom	Andraz Echeverría; Chile	Murillo Sorgetz; Brazil	Matías Contreras; Argentina
Women's K-1 parallel slalom	Omira Estácia Neta; Brazil	Iris Castiglione; Argentina	Florencia Aguirre; Chile
Men's kayak cross	Jesús Martínez; Chile	Murillo Sorgetz; Brazil	Alexis Pérez; Venezuela
Women's kayak cross	Omira Estácia Neta; Brazil	Florencia Aguirre; Chile	Iris Castiglione; Argentina
Men's kayak cross time trial	Jesús Martínez; Chile	Murillo Sorgetz; Brazil	Matías Contreras; Argentina
Women's kayak cross time trial	Omira Estácia Neta; Brazil	Florencia Aguirre; Chile	Iris Castiglione; Argentina

==== Sprint ====
Men

Event	Gold	Silver	Bronze
C-1 500 m	Filipe Santana; Brazil	Aramís Sánchez; Argentina	Reinaldo Argüello; Colombia
C-1 1000 m	Aramís Sánchez; Argentina	Filipe Santana; Brazil	Daniel Pacheco; Colombia
C-2 500 m	Aramís Sánchez; Santiago Piedras; Argentina	Lucas Espirito Santo; Jacky Godmann; Brazil	Fernando Ávila; Daniel Pacheco; Colombia
K-1 500 m	Matías Otero; Uruguay	Manuel Orero; Argentina	Sebastián Alveal; Chile
K-1 1000 m	Agustín Vernice; Argentina	Matías Otero; Uruguay	Sebastián Alveal; Chile
K-2 500 m	Agustín Vernice; Gonzalo Carreras; Argentina	Matías Otero; Santiago Melo; Uruguay	Cristian Canache; Ray Acuña; Venezuela
K-4 500 m	Agustín Vernice; Gonzalo Carreras; Vicente Vergauven; Rubén Voisard; Argentina	Matías Otero; Julián Cabrera; Santiago Melo; Martin Gorriti; Uruguay	Sebastián Alveal; Camilo Valdés; Benjamín Cancino; Marcelo Godoy; Chile

Women

Event	Gold	Silver	Bronze
C-1 200 m	Valdenice Conceição; Brazil	María Mailliard; Chile	Maoli Angulo; Ecuador
C-1 500 m	María Mailliard; Chile	Valdenice Conceição; Brazil	Madison Velásquez; Colombia
C-2 500 m	María Mailliard; Paula Gómez; Chile	Adriely Viana; Valdenice Conceição; Brazil	Tais Trimarchi; Sabrina Zuccoli; Argentina
K-1 200 m	Brenda Rojas; Argentina	Yocelin Canache; Venezuela	Diexe Molina; Colombia
K-1 500 m	Brenda Rojas; Argentina	Ana Paula Vergutz; Brazil	Emilia Milich; Uruguay
K-2 500 m	Brenda Rojas; Magdalena Garro; Argentina	Michelly Souza; Ana Paula Vergutz; Brazil	Stefanie Perdono; Liliana Cardenas; Ecuador
K-4 500 m	Magdalena Garro; Paulina Barreiro; Candelaria Sequeira; Lucía Dalto; Argentina	Diexe Molina; Ximena Rodríguez; Tatiana Muñoz; Mónica Hincapié; Colombia	Daniela Castillo; Francisca Medina; Fernanda Sepúlveda; Florencia Muñoz; Chile

Mixed

Event	Gold	Silver	Bronze
C-2 500 m	Valdenice Conceição; Filipe Santana; Brazil	Matías Jiménez; María Mailliard; Chile	Madison Velásquez; Daniel Pacheco; Colombia
K-2 500 m	Brenda Rojas; Agustín Vernice; Argentina	Emilia Milich; Julián Cabrera; Uruguay	Vagner Souta; Ana Paula Vergutz; Brazil

== Results ==
=== Slalom ===
==== Men's C-1 parallel slalom ====
Time Trial

Rank	Name	Nation	Time	Pen.	Total time	Notes
1	Manuel Trípano	Argentina	31.16	0	31.16	Gold Medal
2	Joachim Berthelot	Peru	31.82	1	32.82	Gold Medal
3	Jose Calasanz	Venezuela	36.46	0	36.46	Bronze Medal
4	Charles Corrêa	Brazil	30.66	50	80.66	Bronze Medal
5	Geral Soto	Chile	31.83	50	81.83	

Final

Rank	Name	Nation	Run 1		Run 2			Notes
Rank	Name	Nation	Pen.	Diff	Time	Pen.	Total time	Notes
Gold Medal
1st place, gold medalist(s)	Manuel Trípano	Argentina	0	+0.00	61.24	0	61.24	
2nd place, silver medalist(s)	Joachim Berthelot	Peru	0	+0.88	62.44	2	64.44	
Bronze Medal
3rd place, bronze medalist(s)	Charles Corrêa	Brazil	0	+1.78	62.47	0	62.47	
4	Jose Calasanz	Venezuela	2	+7.95	71.22	3	74.22	

==== Women's C-1 parallel slalom ====
Time Trial

Rank	Name	Nation	Time	Pen.	Total time	Notes
1	Beatriz Da Motta	Brazil	35.41	0	35.41	Gold Medal
2	Ana Fernandes	Paraguay	37.55	0	37.55	Gold Medal
3	Iris Castiglione	Argentina	37.79	0	37.79	Bronze Medal
4	Florencia Aguirre	Chile	42.92	0	42.92	Bronze Medal
5	Lenny Ramirez	Peru	55.07	0	55.07	

Final

Rank	Name	Nation	Run 1		Run 2			Notes
Rank	Name	Nation	Pen.	Diff	Time	Pen.	Total time	Notes
Gold Medal
1st place, gold medalist(s)	Beatriz Da Motta	Brazil	0	0:00	70.38	1	71.38	
2nd place, silver medalist(s)	Ana Fernandes	Paraguay	1	+2.34	77.42	3	80.42	
Bronze Medal
3rd place, bronze medalist(s)	Iris Castiglione	Argentina	1	+2.55	73.50	1	74.50	
4	Florencia Aguirre	Chile	50	+51.81	75.64	100	175.64	

==== Men's K-1 parallel slalom ====
Time Trial

Rank	Name	Nation	Time	Pen.	Total time	Notes
1	Andraz Echeverría	Chile	26.15	0	26.15	Gold Medal
2	Murillo Sorgetz	Brazil	26.21	0	26.21	Gold Medal
3	Matías Contreras	Argentina	26.29	0	26.29	Bronze Medal
4	Luca Cano	Peru	27.27	0	27.27	Bronze Medal
5	Alexis Pérez	Venezuela	33.29	1	34.29	

Final

Rank	Name	Nation	Run 1		Run 2			Notes
Rank	Name	Nation	Pen.	Diff	Time	Pen.	Total time	Notes
Gold Medal
1st place, gold medalist(s)	Andraz Echeverría	Chile	0	+0.37	52.00	1	53.00	
2nd place, silver medalist(s)	Murillo Sorgetz	Brazil	0	+0.00	50.79	50	100.79	
Bronze Medal
3rd place, bronze medalist(s)	Matías Contreras	Argentina	1	+1.08	53.33	1	54.33	
4	Jose Calasanz	Venezuela	0	+0.00	53.69	1	54.69	

==== Women's K-1 parallel slalom ====
Time Trial

Rank	Name	Nation	Time	Pen.	Total time	Notes
1	Omira Estácia Neta	Brazil	28.90	0	28.90	Gold Medal
2	Iris Castiglione	Argentina	32.56	0	32.56	Gold Medal
3	Florencia Aguirre	Chile	33.77	1	34.77	Bronze Medal
4	Ana Fernandes	Paraguay	35.97	0	35.97	Bronze Medal
5	Lenny Ramirez	Peru	41.75	1	42.75	

Final

Rank	Name	Nation	Run 1		Run 2			Notes
Rank	Name	Nation	Pen.	Diff	Time	Pen.	Total time	Notes
Gold Medal
1st place, gold medalist(s)	Omira Estácia Neta	Brazil	0	0:00	59.68	1	60.68	
2nd place, silver medalist(s)	Iris Castiglione	Argentina	1	+3.42	63.33	1	64.33	
Bronze Medal
3rd place, bronze medalist(s)	Florencia Aguirre	Chile	0	+3.15	64.61	0	64.61	
4	Ana Fernandes	Paraguay	2	+6.77	69.95	3	72.95	

==== Men's kayak cross ====
Time Trial

Semifinal

Rank	Name	Nation	Notes
1	Murillo Sorgetz	Brazil	QF
2	Matías Contreras	Argentina	QF
3	Alexis Pérez	Venezuela	QF
4	Eriberto Gutiérrez	Peru	

Final

Rank	Name	Nation	Notes
1st place, gold medalist(s)	Jesús Martínez	Chile	
2nd place, silver medalist(s)	Murillo Sorgetz	Brazil	
3rd place, bronze medalist(s)	Alexis Pérez	Venezuela	
4	Matías Contreras	Argentina	FLT

==== Women's kayak cross ====
Time Trial

Semifinal

Rank	Name	Nation	Notes
1	Florencia Aguirre	Chile	QF
2	Iris Castiglione	Argentina	QF
3	Ana Fernandes	Paraguay	QF
4	Lenny Ramirez	Peru	

Final

Rank	Name	Nation	Notes
1st place, gold medalist(s)	Omira Estácia Neta	Brazil	
2nd place, silver medalist(s)	Florencia Aguirre	Chile	
3rd place, bronze medalist(s)	Iris Castiglione	Argentina	
4	Ana Fernandes	Paraguay	

==== Men's kayak cross time trial ====
Progression System: The top athlete from each country qualifies. The winner advances directly to the final, while those placing 2nd through 5th qualify for the semifinal.

Rank	Name	Nation	Pen.	Time	Notes
1st place, gold medalist(s)	Jesús Martínez	Chile	0	36.80	QF
2nd place, silver medalist(s)	Murillo Sorgetz	Brazil	0	36.82	QSF
3rd place, bronze medalist(s)	Matías Contreras	Argentina	0	37.14	QSF
4	Eriberto Gutiérrez	Peru	0	41.52	QSF
5	Alexis Pérez	Venezuela	0	44.36	QSF
6	Guilherme Mapelli	Brazil	0	36.85	
7	Manuel Trípano	Argentina	0	37.19	
8	Andraz Echeverría	Chile	0	37.90	
9	Jose Calasanz	Venezuela	0	49.33	
10	Luca Cano	Peru	2	39.75	

==== Women's kayak cross time trial ====
Progression System: The top athlete from each country qualifies. The winner advances directly to the final, while those placing 2nd through 5th qualify for the semifinal.

Rank	Name	Nation	Pen.	Time	Notes
1st place, gold medalist(s)	Omira Estácia Neta	Brazil	0	42.71	QF
2nd place, silver medalist(s)	Florencia Aguirre	Chile	0	43.58	QSF
3rd place, bronze medalist(s)	Iris Castiglione	Argentina	0	44.36	QSF
4	Ana Fernandes	Paraguay	0	50.17	QSF
5	Lenny Ramirez	Peru	0	54.70	QSF
6	Daniela Sofia	Brazil	2	45.43	

=== Sprint ===
==== Men's C-1 500 m ====
Rank	Name	Nation	Time	Notes
1st place, gold medalist(s)	Filipe Santana	Brazil	1:40.29	
2nd place, silver medalist(s)	Aramís Sánchez	Argentina	1:41.05	
3rd place, bronze medalist(s)	Reinaldo Argüello	Venezuela	1:43.62	
4	Joaquín Lagos	Chile	1:43.67	
5	Cristhian Sola	Ecuador	1:44.75	
6	Daniel Pacheco	Colombia	1:46.30	
7	Yoel Becerra	Uruguay	1:46.55	
8	Diner Pizango	Peru	1:51.79	

==== Men's C-1 1000 m ====
Rank	Name	Nation	Time	Notes
1st place, gold medalist(s)	Aramís Sánchez	Argentina	3:40.47	
2nd place, silver medalist(s)	Filipe Santana	Brazil	3:42.22	
3rd place, bronze medalist(s)	Daniel Pacheco	Colombia	3:44.59	
4	Matías Jiménez	Chile	3:45.85	
5	Jeremi Iglesia	Venezuela	3:46.12	
6	Yoel Becerra	Uruguay	3:48.91	
7	Cristhian Sola	Ecuador	3:57.17	
8	Wilian Figueroa	Peru	4:03.33	

==== Men's C-2 500 m ====
Rank	Name	Nation	Time	Notes
1st place, gold medalist(s)	Aramís Sánchez; Santiago Piedras	Argentina	1:35.38	
2nd place, silver medalist(s)	Lucas Espirito Santo; Jacky Godmann	Brazil	1:35.43	
3rd place, bronze medalist(s)	Fernando Ávila; Daniel Pacheco	Colombia	1:37.64	
4	Cristhian Sola; Alan Sola	Ecuador	1:38.84	
5	Joaquín Lagos; Matías Jiménez	Chile	1:39.63	
6	Jeremi Iglesia; Reinaldo Argüello	Venezuela	1:40.41	
7	Diner Pizango; Wilian Figueroa	Peru	1:45.55	

==== Men's K-1 500 m ====
Rank	Name	Nation	Time	Notes
1st place, gold medalist(s)	Matías Otero	Uruguay	1:33.10	
2nd place, silver medalist(s)	Manuel Orerovvv	Argentina	1:35.82	
3rd place, bronze medalist(s)	Sebastián Alveal	Chile	1:35.97	
4	Felipe Folador	Brazil	1:36.53	
5	Ray Acuña	Venezuela	1:39.44	
6	Victor Barón	Colombia	1:43.01	
7	Esteven Hidalgo	Peru	1:47.10	
8	Sergio Velasquez	Bolivia	1:56.96	

==== Men's K-1 1000 m ====
Rank	Name	Nation	Time	Notes
1st place, gold medalist(s)	Agustín Vernice	Argentina	3:19.75	
2nd place, silver medalist(s)	Matías Otero	Uruguay	3:24.80	
3rd place, bronze medalist(s)	Sebastián Alveal	Chile	3:27.84	
4	Felipe Folador	Brazil	3:31.56	
5	Leocadio Pinto	Colombia	3:34.00	
6	Santiago Ramos	Venezuela	3:34.58	
7	Esteven Hidalgo	Peru	3:51.56	
8	Jhamil Cuba	Bolivia	4:12.07	

==== Men's K-2 500 m ====
Rank	Name	Nation	Time	Notes
1st place, gold medalist(s)	Agustín Vernice; Gonzalo Carreras	Argentina	1:25.15	
2nd place, silver medalist(s)	Matías Otero; Santiago Melo	Uruguay	1:26.61	
3rd place, bronze medalist(s)	Cristian Canache; Ray Acuña	Venezuela	1:27.23	
4	Vagner Souta; Felipe Folador	Brazil	1:27.88	
5	Marcelo Godoy; Camilo Valdés	Chile	1:29.63	
6	Leocadio Pinto; Victor Barón	Colombia	1:33.22	
7	Esteven Hidalgo; Rafael Torres	Peru	1:36.41	
8	Fabio Calle; Sergio Velasquez	Bolivia	1:53.68	

==== Men's K-4 500 m ====
Rank	Name	Nation	Time	Notes
1st place, gold medalist(s)	Agustín Vernice; Vicente Vergauven; Gonzalo Carreras; Rubén Voisard	Argentina	1:16.83	
2nd place, silver medalist(s)	Matías Otero; Santiago Melo; Julián Cabrera; Martin Gorriti	Uruguay	1:18.14	
3rd place, bronze medalist(s)	Sebastián Alveal; Benjamín Cancino; Camilo Valdés; Marcelo Godoy	Chile	1:18.22	
4	Santiago Ramos; Cristian Canache; Ray Acuña; Daniel Roman	Venezuela	1:23.29	
5	Sebastián Zapata; Leocadio Pinto; Victor Barón; Mateo Pérez	Colombia	1:24.13	
6	Esteven Hidalgo; Rafael Torres; Raúl López; Jhon Córdova	Peru	1:28.83	
7	Jhamil Cuba; Fabio Calle; Yurgen Orellana; Sergio Velasquez	Bolivia	1:38.93	

==== Women's C-1 200 m ====
Rank	Name	Nation	Time	Notes
1st place, gold medalist(s)	Valdenice Conceição	Brazil	44.69	
2nd place, silver medalist(s)	María Mailliard	Chile	45.97	
3rd place, bronze medalist(s)	Maoli Angulo	Ecuador	46.11	
4	Madison Velásquez	Colombia	46.32	
5	Tais Trimarchi	Argentina	50.49	
6	Luismary Santamaria	Venezuela	50.66	
7	Johana Padilla	Peru	54.49	

==== Women's C-1 500 m ====
Rank	Name	Nation	Time	Notes
1st place, gold medalist(s)	María Mailliard	Chile	1:58.16	
2nd place, silver medalist(s)	Valdenice Conceição	Brazil	2:03.77	
3rd place, bronze medalist(s)	Madison Velásquez	Colombia	2:05.80	
4	Maoli Angulo	Ecuador	2:06.99	
5	Luismary Santamaria	Venezuela	2:13.86	
6	Sabrina Zuccoli	Argentina	2:17.24	
7	Johana Padilla	Peru	2:19.39	

==== Women's C-2 500 m ====
Rank	Name	Nation	Time	Notes
1st place, gold medalist(s)	María Mailliard; Paula Gómez	Chile	1:52.67	
2nd place, silver medalist(s)	Adriely Viana; Valdenice Conceição	Brazil	1:56.63	
3rd place, bronze medalist(s)	Tais Trimarchi; Sabrina Zuccoli	Argentina	2:06.77	
4	Daniela Runciman; Johana Padilla	Peru	2:09.69	

==== Women's K-1 200 m ====
Rank	Name	Nation	Time	Notes
1st place, gold medalist(s)	Brenda Rojas	Argentina	40.62	
2nd place, silver medalist(s)	Yocelin Canache	Venezuela	40.65	
3rd place, bronze medalist(s)	Diexe Molina	Colombia	41.76	
4	Ana Paula Vergutz	Brazil	42.28	
5	Emilia Milich	Uruguay	42.40	
6	Daniela Castillo	Chile	42.63	
7	Stefanie Perdono	Ecuador	42.83	
8	Kyara Vargas	Peru	50.58	
9	Jazmín Calle	Bolivia	56.01	

==== Women's K-1 500 m ====
Rank	Name	Nation	Time	Notes
1st place, gold medalist(s)	Brenda Rojas	Argentina	1:48.66	
2nd place, silver medalist(s)	Ana Paula Vergutz	Brazil	1:49.92	
3rd place, bronze medalist(s)	Emilia Milich	Uruguay	1:50.41	
4	Diexe Molina	Colombia	1:50.82	
5	Stefanie Perdono	Ecuador	1:52.82	
6	Yocelin Canache	Venezuela	1:54.79	
7	Daniela Castillo	Chile	1:54.88	
8	Kyara Vargas	Peru	2:15.03	
9	Jazmín Calle	Bolivia	2:18.08	

==== Women's K-2 500 m ====
Rank	Name	Nation	Time	Notes
1st place, gold medalist(s)	Brenda Rojas; Magdalena Garro	Argentina	1:37.51	
2nd place, silver medalist(s)	Michelly Souza; Ana Paula Vergutz	Brazil	1:40.94	
3rd place, bronze medalist(s)	Stefanie Perdono; Liliana Cardenas	Ecuador	1:41.59	
4	Florencia Muñoz; Daniela Castillo	Chile	1:42.84	
5	Tatiana Muñoz; Mónica Hincapié	Colombia	1:43.19	
6	Milagros Croci; Camila Ávila	Uruguay	1:49.90	
7	Wuillianny Canache; Jeandra Velásquez	Venezuela	1:52.62	
8	Jazmín Calle; Angelina Rodriguez	Bolivia	2:15.00	
9	Kyara Vargas; Belén Arévalo	Peru	3:03.24	

==== Women's K-4 500 m ====
Rank	Name	Nation	Time	Notes
1st place, gold medalist(s)	Magdalena Garro; Candelaria Sequeira; Paulina Barreiro; Lucía Dalto	Argentina	1:31.25	
2nd place, silver medalist(s)	Diexe Molina; Tatiana Muñoz; Ximena Rodríguez; Mónica Hincapié	Colombia	1:34.40	
3rd place, bronze medalist(s)	Daniela Castillo; Fernanda Sepúlveda; Francisca Medina; Florencia Muñoz	Chile	1:36.56	
4	Milagros Croci; Agostina Revello; Emilia Milich; Camila Ávila	Uruguay	1:38.55	

==== Mixed C-2 500 m ====
Rank	Name	Nation	Time	Notes
1st place, gold medalist(s)	Valdenice Conceição; Filipe Santana	Brazil	1:42.71	
2nd place, silver medalist(s)	Matías Jiménez; María Mailliard	Chile	1:42.95	
3rd place, bronze medalist(s)	Madison Velásquez; Daniel Pacheco	Colombia	1:44.22	
4	Maoli Angulo; Cristhian Sola	Ecuador	1:44.34	
5	Luismary Santamaria; Reinaldo Argüello	Venezuela	1:50.12	
6	Sabrina Zuccoli; Joaquín Gallardo	Argentina	1:54.57	
7	Johana Padilla; Wilian Figueroa	Peru	1:55.82	

==== Mixed K-2 500 m ====
Rank	Name	Nation	Time	Notes
1st place, gold medalist(s)	Brenda Rojas; Agustín Vernice	Argentina	1:30.21	
2nd place, silver medalist(s)	Emilia Milich; Julián Cabrera	Uruguay	1:31.73	
3rd place, bronze medalist(s)	Vagner Souta; Ana Paula Vergutz	Brazil	1:33.09	
4	Sebastián Alveal; Daniela Castillo	Chile	1:33.50	
5	Yocelin Canache; Cristian Canache	Venezuela	1:35.83	
6	Mónica Hincapié; Sebastián Zapata	Colombia	1:36.32	
7	Kyara Vargas; Esteven Hidalgo	Peru	1:44.37	
	Jazmín Calle; Sergio Velasquez	Bolivia	DNF	
