= Canoeing at the 2019 Pan American Games – Qualification =

The following is about the qualification system and qualified countries for the Canoeing at the 2019 Pan American Games competition to be held in Lima, Peru.

== Qualification timeline ==
Events	Date	Venue
2018 Pan American Canoe Sprint Championships	September 13–16	(Canada) Dartmouth
2019 Pan American Canoe Slalom Championships	April 26–28	(Brazil) Três Coroas

== Qualification system ==
A total of 169 canoe and kayak athletes will qualify to compete. 125 will qualify in sprint (60 per gender plus five wild cards) and 44 in canoe slalom (22 per gender). The host nation (Peru) is guaranteed two quotas in the slalom events and it must qualify in sprint. A nation may enter a maximum of 6 athletes in slalom (three per gender) and 16 in sprint. The 2018 Pan American Canoe Sprint Championships and the 2019 Pan American Canoe Slalom Championships will be used to distribute the quotas.

== Qualification summary ==
NOC	Slalom						Sprint												Total	
NOC	Men			Women			Men						Women						Boats	Athletes
NOC	K1	C1	EK1	K1	C1	EK1	K1 200	K1 1000	K2 1000	K4 500	C1 1000	C2 1000	K1 200	K1 500	K2 500	K4 500	C1 200	C2 500	Boats	Athletes
Argentina	X	X	X	X	X	X	X	X	X	X	X		X	X	X	X			15	17
Belize							X	X					X	X	X				5	3
Bolivia	X		X																2	1
Brazil	X	X	X	X	X	X	X	X	X	X	X	X	X	X			X	X	16	15
Canada	X	X		X	X		X	X	X	X	X	X	X	X	X	X	X	X	15	20
Chile	X	X	X	X	X	X	X	X			X		X	X	X	X	X	X	14	12
Colombia							X	X									X	X	4	3
Costa Rica	X	X																	2	1
Cuba							X	X	X	X	X	X	X	X	X	X	X	X	12	12
Dominican Republic							X	X	X		X								4	3
Ecuador							X	X	X		X	X	X	X	X		X		9	6
Guatemala							X	X									X		3	2
Jamaica							X	X											2	1
Mexico	X	X	X	X	X		X	X	X	X	X	X	X	X	X	X	X	X	15	19
Paraguay				X	X														2	1
Peru	X	X		X	X								X	X	X	X			8	8
Puerto Rico							X	X	X				X	X					5	3
Trinidad and Tobago							X	X	X										3	2
United States	X	X		X	X			X	X	X	X	X	X	X	X	X	X		14	17
Uruguay								X	X	X	X								4	5
Venezuela	X	X		X	X	X					X	X	X	X	X	X			11	11
Total: 21 NOCs	10	9	5	9	9	4	16	16	11	7	11	6	12	12	10	8	9	6	170	165

== Slalom ==
A total of 44 quota spots are available in slalom (34 in slalom and 10 in extreme). The top 9 in each kayak event (including the host nation, Peru) will qualify along with the top 8 in each canoe event. An athlete can only compete in one slalom event (but can compete in two if the country has not qualified a spot in the other event). One wild card spot will also be allocated A further 5 spots will be available for each extreme event. All athletes qualified in slalom can compete in the extreme events. At the end of qualification, one spot in kayak women, women's extreme kayak and men's canoe slalom along with the wild card quota (for a total of four quotas) were not used.

=== Qualification table ===
Event	K1 Men	C1 Men	K1 Women	C1 Women	Extreme K1 Men	Extreme K1 Women
2019 Pan American Canoe Slalom Championships	Argentina; Bolivia; Brazil; Canada; Chile; Costa Rica; Mexico; Peru; United States; Venezuela	Argentina; Brazil; Canada; Chile; Costa Rica; Mexico; Peru; United States; Venezuela	Argentina; Brazil; Canada; Chile; Mexico; Paraguay; Peru; United States; Venezuela	Argentina; Brazil; Canada; Chile; Mexico; Paraguay; Peru; United States; Venezuela	Argentina; Bolivia; Brazil; Chile; Mexico	Argentina; Brazil; Chile; Venezuela
Total 11 NOC's	10	9	9	9	5	4

- Countries in italics are double starters (the athlete qualified in another event but is also starting in the other event). Countries are listed in alphabetical order.
- Note: Total quotas awarded were 40 (9 in men's kayak, 7 in men's canoe, 8 in both women's kayak and canoe, 5 in men's extreme and 4 in women's kayak). The total numbers above reflect double starters.
- Other countries may double up until the conclusion of entries.

== Sprint ==
A total of 125 quotas were distributed. An athlete can only qualify one boat for their country. In each discipline the competitions will start with the larger boats and work their way down till the last event. In the second event and onward (if applicable) for each discipline, places can only be qualified by athletes that have not already qualified. Countries qualified in the largest boat per discipline/gender are required to compete in the smaller boats as well (even if they do not qualify additional athletes). This is summarized per event below. There will be 5 wild card spots handed out to countries that failed to qualify, but competed at the qualification tournament. An athlete qualifying in event can compete in another event, as long as no other boat from their country is competing.

Only one country did not qualify: Jamaica. They will be awarded with a wild card slot in the event their athlete competed. The other four wild card spots will be reallocated. The USA qualified one more athlete than the maximum allowed in men's kayak. That spot will be reallocated. In both canoe disciplines, both filled their quotas. In women's kayak 11 quota spots need to be reallocated. Argentina qualified an extra slot in kayak (11 in total) which will need to be reallocated, leaving a total of 17 spots to be reallocated.

Three nations: Dominican Republic, Venezuela and host nation Peru received reallocated quotas even though they did not compete at the qualifiers.

=== Men's K4 500m ===
Competition	Boats	Athlete total	Qualified
2018 Pan American Championship	6	24	Canada; Argentina; Mexico; Brazil; Cuba; United States
Reallocation	1	1	Uruguay
TOTAL	7	25	

- Uruguay received an extra kayak slot to enter a boat.

=== Men's K2 1000m ===
Competition	Boats	Athlete total	Qualified
2018 Pan American Championship	5	10	Argentina; Uruguay; United States; Puerto Rico; Ecuador
2018 Pan American Championship required to compete	4	—N/a	Canada; Mexico; Brazil; Cuba
Reallocation	2	3	Dominican Republic; Trinidad and Tobago
TOTAL	11	13	

- Trinidad and Tobago received one extra athlete slot to enter in this event.

=== Men's K1 1000m ===
Competition	Boats	Athlete total	Qualified
2018 Pan American Championship	5	5	Uruguay; Colombia; United States; Belize; Trinidad and Tobago
2018 Pan American Championship required to compete	4	—N/a	Canada; Mexico; Brazil; Cuba
Entries from other events	5	—N/a	Argentina; Chile; Dominican Republic; Ecuador; Puerto Rico
Reallocation	1	1	Guatemala
Wildcard	1	1	Jamaica
TOTAL	16	7	

=== Men's K1 200m ===
Competition	Boats	Athlete total	Qualified
2018 Pan American Championship	5	5	Ecuador; Argentina; Canada; Chile; Mexico
2018 Pan American Championship required to compete	2	—N/a	Brazil; Cuba
Entries from other events	9	—N/a	Belize; Colombia; Dominican Republic; Guatemala; Jamaica; Puerto Rico; Trinidad and Tobago; Uruguay; United States
TOTAL	17	5	

=== Men's C2 1000m ===
Competition	Boats	Athlete total	Qualified
2018 Pan American Championship	4	8	Cuba; Brazil; Canada; Mexico; ~~Colombia~~
Reallocation	2	4	Ecuador; Venezuela
TOTAL	6	12	

- Colombia declined its two athlete quotas.

=== Men's C1 1000m ===
Competition	Boats	Athlete total	Qualified
2018 Pan American Championship	5	5	Argentina; Canada; Chile; ~~Colombia~~; Mexico; United States
2018 Pan American Championship required to compete	2	—N/a	Cuba; Brazil
Entries from other events	2	—N/a	Ecuador; Venezuela
Reallocation	2	2	Dominican Republic; Peru
TOTAL	10	7	

- Colombia declined its quota

=== Women's K4 500m ===
Competition	Boats	Athlete total	Qualified
2018 Pan American Championship	6	24	Canada; Mexico; Argentina; Chile; Cuba; United States
Reallocation	2	8	Peru; Venezuela
TOTAL	8	32	

=== Women's K2 500m ===
Competition	Boats	Athlete total	Qualified
2018 Pan American Championship	~~5~~ 1	~~10~~ 2	Ecuador; ~~Colombia~~
2018 Pan American Championship required to compete	6	—N/a	Canada; Mexico; Argentina; Chile; Cuba; United States
Entries from other events	2	—N/a	Peru; Venezuela
Reallocation	1	1	Belize
TOTAL	10	~~10~~ 3	

- Colombia declined its quota.
- Belize was given an extra quota to compete in the event.

=== Women's K1 500m ===
Competition	Boats	Athlete total	Qualified
2018 Pan American Championship	~~5~~ 3	~~5~~ 3	Brazil; Puerto Rico; Belize
2018 Pan American Championship required to compete	6	—N/a	Canada; Mexico; Argentina; Chile; Cuba; United States
Entries from other events	3	—N/a	Ecuador; Peru; Venezuela
TOTAL	12	3	

=== Women's K1 200m ===
Competition	Boats	Athlete total	Qualified
2018 Pan American Championship	~~5~~ 2	~~5~~ 2	Canada; Argentina; ~~Colombia~~
2018 Pan American Championship required to compete	4	—N/a	Mexico; Chile; Cuba; United States
Entries from other events	5	—N/a	Belize; Brazil; Ecuador; Peru; Venezuela
TOTAL	11	2	

=== Women's C2 500m ===
Competition	Boats	Athlete total	Qualified
2018 Pan American Championship	5	10	Canada; Cuba; Chile; Brazil; Colombia
Reallocation	1	1	Mexico
TOTAL	6	11	

- Mexico was given an extra quota to compete in the event.

=== Women's C1 200m ===
Competition	Boats	Athlete total	Qualified
2018 Pan American Championship	6	6	Brazil; Canada; Ecuador; Guatemala; Mexico; United States
2018 Pan American Championship required to compete	3	—N/a	Cuba; Chile; Colombia
TOTAL	9	6	
