= Canoeing at the 2023 Pan American Games – Women's slalom K-1 =

Women's slalom K-1 at the 2023 Pan American Games
- Venue: Aconcagua River
- Dates: October 28 – October 29 2023
- Winning time: 102.32

Medalists
Gold medal	Evy Leibfarth	United States
Silver medal	Omira Estácia Neta	Brazil
Bronze medal	Léa Baldoni	Canada

The women's slalom k-1 competition of the canoeing events at the 2023 Pan American Games was held from October 28 to 29 at the Aconcagua River in Los Andes, Chile.

== Schedule ==
Date	Time	Round
October 28, 2023	10:36	Heats
October 29, 2023	10:36	Semi-final
October 29, 2023	12:00	Final

== Results ==
The seven best times advance to the semi-finals. From there, the best six times advance to the final, where the medals are determined.

Rank	Name	Preliminary Heats						Semifinal			Final	
Rank	Name	1st Ride	Pen.	2nd Ride	Pen.	Best	Rank	Time	Pen.	Rank	Time	Pen.
1st place, gold medalist(s)	Evy Leibfarth (USA)	81.93	0	80.26	0	80.26	1	102.44	4	1	102.32	6
2nd place, silver medalist(s)	Omira Estácia Neta (BRA)	85.10	0	88.21	2	85.10	2	106.29	2	2	110.54	4
3rd place, bronze medalist(s)	Léa Baldoni (CAN)	88.34	2	87.14	0	87.14	3	108.78	4	3	116.06	10
4	Sofía Reinoso (MEX)	95.10	0	100.31	4	95.10	4	121.42	2	4	127.71	10
5	Emilie Armani (ECU)	100.80	0	105.57	0	100.80	6	135.72	2	5	145.23	12
6	Lenny Ramírez (PER)	123.19	7	174.31	54	123.19	7	195.38	58	6	402.00	208
7	María Luz Cassini (ARG)	97.77	2	97.47	4	97.47	5	289.28	150	7	did not advance	
8	Florencia Aguirre (CHI)	152.39	52	150.88	52	150.88	8	did not advance				
9	Marianna Torres (VEN)	187.64	52	188.39	54	187.64	9	did not advance				
