= Canoeing at the 2018 Central American and Caribbean Games =

- Venue: Calima Lake, Colombia
- Dates: 31 July – 2 August

The canoeing competition at the 2018 Central American and Caribbean Games was held from 31 July to 2 August at Calima Lake, Colombia.

== Medal summary ==
=== Men's events ===
Event	Gold	Silver	Bronze
K1 200m	Fidel Vargas (CUB)	Alberto Briones (MEX)	Eddy Barranco (PUR)
K1 1000m	Fidel Vargas (CUB)	Juan Rodríguez (MEX)	Cristian Guerrero (DOM)
K2 1000m	Mexico (MEX); Javier López; Osbaldo Fuentes	Venezuela (VEN); Cristian Canache; Ray Acuña	Cuba (CUB); Fidel Vargas; Reinier Torres
K4 500m	Mexico (MEX); Javier López; Mauricio Figueroa; Juan Rodríguez; Osbaldo Fuentes	Cuba (CUB); Fidel Vargas; Renier Mora; Reinier Torres; Robert Benítez	Venezuela (VEN); Cristian Canache; Joel González; Antonio Oropeza; Ray Acuña
C1 1000m	Fernando Jorge (CUB)	José Cristóbal (MEX)	Sergio Díaz (COL)
C2 1000m	Cuba (CUB); Serguey Torres; Fernando Jorge	Colombia (COL); Sergio Díaz; Daniel Pacheco	Mexico (MEX); Jorge Gutiérrez; Rigoberto Camilo

=== Women's events ===
Event	Gold	Silver	Bronze
K1 200m	Yurieni Guerra (CUB)	Brenda Gutiérrez (MEX)	Tatiana Muñoz (COL)
K1 500m	Yurieni Guerra (CUB)	Beatriz Briones (MEX)	Diexe Molina (COL)
K2 500m	Mexico (MEX); Karina Alanís; Maricela Montemayor	Colombia (COL); Tatiana Muñoz; Diexe Molina	Cuba (CUB); Yurieni Guerra; Flavia López

== Medal table ==
* Host nation (Colombia)

Rank	Nation	Gold	Silver	Bronze	Total
1	Cuba (CUB)	6	1	2	9
2	Mexico (MEX)	3	5	1	9
3	Colombia (COL)*	0	2	3	5
4	Venezuela (VEN)	0	1	1	2
5	Dominican Republic (DOM)	0	0	1	1
5	Puerto Rico (PUR)	0	0	1	1
Totals (6 entries)		9	9	9	27
