= Canoeing at the 2023 Pan American Games =

- Canoeing pictograms
- Venues: Aconcagua River (Slalom); Laguna Grande (Sprint)
- Start date: October 27, 2023
- End date: November 4, 2023
- No. of events: 16 (8 men, 8 women)
- Competitors: 174

Canoeing competitions at the 2023 Pan American Games are scheduled to take place between October 27 and November 4, 2023 at the Aconcagua River in Los Andes (slalom) and Laguna Grande in San Pedro de la Paz (sprint).

A total of 16 events (ten in sprint and six in slalom) will be contested, two less than last edition of the games. Two events in canoe sprint (K−1 200, men and women) have been dropped. The men's C-2 and K-2 events will also now be contested over 500 meters, instead of 1000. 176 athletes (130 in sprint, and 46 in slalom) are scheduled to contest the events.

== Qualification ==
A total of 176 canoe and kayak athletes will qualify to compete. 126 will qualify in sprint (63 per gender) + four winners from the 2021 Junior Pan American Games and 46 in canoe slalom (23 per gender). The host nation (Chile) is guaranteed a boat in each event in the sprint discipline and in slalom (except the extreme events), however it must compete in the respective qualification tournaments.

== Medal summary ==
=== Medal table ===
* Host nation (Chile)

| Rank | Nation | Gold | Silver | Bronze | Total |
|---|---|---|---|---|---|
| 1 | Canada | 4 | 5 | 5 | 14 |
| 2 | Brazil | 3 | 5 | 0 | 8 |
| 3 | United States | 3 | 1 | 3 | 7 |
| 4 | Argentina | 2 | 3 | 2 | 7 |
| 5 | Cuba | 2 | 0 | 1 | 3 |
| 5 | Mexico | 2 | 0 | 1 | 3 |
| 7 | Chile* | 0 | 2 | 0 | 2 |
| 8 | Paraguay | 0 | 0 | 2 | 2 |
| 9 | Colombia | 0 | 0 | 1 | 1 |
| 9 | Peru | 0 | 0 | 1 | 1 |
| Totals (10 entries) | | 16 | 16 | 16 | 48 |

=== Medalists ===
==== Slalom ====
| Event | Gold | Silver | Bronze |
|---|---|---|---|
| Men's C-1 | Zachary Lokken; United States | Kauã da Silva; Brazil | Leonardo Curcel; Paraguay |
| Women's C-1 | Ana Sátila; Brazil | Lois Betteridge; Canada | Ana Paula Fernandes Castro; Paraguay |
| Men's K-1 | Joshua Joseph; United States | Pepe Gonçalves; Brazil | Mael Rivard; Canada |
| Women's K-1 | Evy Leibfarth; United States | Omira Estácia Neta; Brazil | Léa Baldoni; Canada |
| Men's kayak cross | Guilherme Mapelli; Brazil | Alex Baldoni; Canada | Eriberto Gutiérrez; Peru |
| Women's kayak cross | Ana Sátila; Brazil | Lois Betteridge; Canada | Evy Leibfarth; United States |

==== Sprint ====
Men

| Event | Gold | Silver | Bronze |
|---|---|---|---|
| C-1 1000 m | José Ramón Pelier; Cuba | Isaquias Queiroz; Brazil | Connor Fitzpatrick; Canada |
| C-2 500 m | Canada; Craig Spence; Alix Plomteux | Brazil; Evandilson Avelar; Filipe Santana | Cuba; José Ramón Pelier; Javier Requeiro |
| K-1 1000 m | Agustín Vernice; Argentina | Jonas Ecker; United States | Valentín Rossi; Argentina |
| K-2 500 m | Canada; Ian Gaudet; Simon McTavish | Argentina; Gonzalo Lo Moro; Agustín Vernice | United States; Jonas Ecker; Aaron Small |
| K-4 500 m | Argentina; Agustín Vernice; Manuel Lascano; Gonzalo Lo Moro; Gonzalo Carreras | Canada; Nicholas Matveev; Pierre-Luc Poulin; Laurent Lavigne; Simon McTavish | United States; Nathan Humberston; Sean Talbert; Cole Jones; Augustus Cook |

Women

| Event | Gold | Silver | Bronze |
|---|---|---|---|
| C-1 200 m | Yarisleidis Cirilo; Cuba | María Mailliard; Chile | Sophia Jensen; Canada |
| C-2 500 m | Canada; Sloan Mackenzie; Katie Vincent | Chile; María Mailliard; Paula Gómez | Colombia; Madison Velásquez; Manuela Gómez |
| K-1 500 m | Michelle Russell; Canada | Brenda Rojas; Argentina | Beatriz Briones; Mexico |
| K-2 500 m | Mexico; Karina Alanis; Beatriz Briones | Argentina; Brenda Rojas; Maria Garro | Canada; Courtney Stott; Madeline Schmidt |
| K-4 500 m | Mexico; Karina Alanis; Brenda Gutiérrez; Beatriz Briones; Maricela Montemayor | Canada; Courtney Stott; Natalie Davison; Riley Melanson; Toshka Besharah-Hrebacka | Argentina; Candelaria Sequeira; Lucia Dalto; Martina Isequilla; Sabrina Ameghino |

== See also ==
- Canoeing at the 2024 Summer Olympics
