= Belize at the 2015 Pan American Games =

- IOC code: BIZ
- NOC: Belize Olympic and Commonwealth Games Association
- Website: belizeolympicteam.com

in Toronto, Canada 10–26 July 2015
- Competitors: 3 in 2 sports
- Flag bearer (opening): Amed Figueroa
- Flag bearer (closing): Mark Anderson
- Medals: Gold 0 Silver 0 Bronze 0 Total 0

Pan American Games appearances (overview)
- 1967; 1971; 1975; 1979; 1983; 1987; 1991; 1995; 1999; 2003; 2007; 2011; 2015; 2019; 2023; 2027

Belize competed at the 2015 Pan American Games in Toronto, Ontario, Canada from July 10 to 26, 2015.

The Belizean team consisting of three (two men and one woman) athletes in two sports (athletics and triathlon) was announced on July 4, 2015. This occasion marked the country's debut in the sport of triathlon. Triathlete Amed Figueroa was the flagbearer for the team during the opening ceremony.

Belize did not medal at the games, with sprinter Kaina Martinez finishing with the nation's highest placement (23rd place) in the women's 100 metres track and field event.

== Competitors ==
The following table lists Belize's delegation per sport and gender.

Sport	Men	Women	Total
Athletics	1	1	2
Triathlon	1	0	1
Total	2	1	3

== Athletics ==
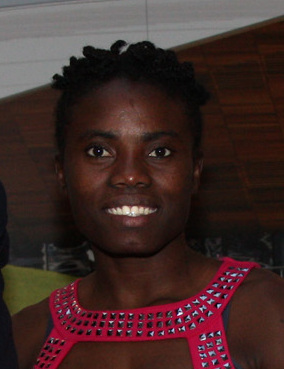
Kaina Martinez represented Belize in the women's 100 metres event

Belize received two wildcards (one man and one woman).

Track events

Athlete	Event	Round 1		Semifinal		Final	
Athlete	Event	Result	Rank	Result	Rank	Result	Rank
Mark Anderson	Men's 200 m	22.24	28	did not advance			
Kaina Martinez	Women's 100 m	11.69	23	did not advance			

== Triathlon ==
Belize received a wildcard to enter one male triathlete. This marked the country's debut in the sport at the Pan American Games.

Men

Athlete	Event	Swim (1.5 km)	Trans 1	Bike (40 km)	Trans 2	Run (10 km)	Total	Rank
Amed Figueroa	Individual	Lapped						

== See also ==
- Belize at the 2016 Summer Olympics
