= Belize at the 2011 Pan American Games =

- IOC code: BIZ
- NOC: Belize Olympic and Commonwealth Games Association
- Website: belizeolympicteam.com

in Guadalajara 14–30 October 2011
- Competitors: 10 in 1 sport
- Flag bearer: Albert Jones (Chef de mission)
- Medals: Gold 0 Silver 0 Bronze 0 Total 0

Pan American Games appearances (overview)
- 1967; 1971; 1975; 1979; 1983; 1987; 1991; 1995; 1999; 2003; 2007; 2011; 2015; 2019; 2023

Belize competed at the 2011 Pan American Games in Guadalajara, Mexico from October 14 to 30, 2011. Belize competed in one sport, athletics, with ten athletes.

== Athletics ==
Belize qualified ten athletes.

Men

Athlete	Event	Heats		Semifinals		Final	
Athlete	Event	Result	Rank	Result	Rank	Result	Rank
Linford Avila	100 m	11.74	32nd	did not advance			
Jorge Jimenez	200 m	23.55	31st	did not advance			
Jayson Jones	400 m			51.60	32nd	did not advance	
Kenneth Medwood	400 m hurdles			51.90	15th	did not advance	
Keneth Brackett; Jayson Jones; Linford Avila; Kenneth Medwood	4×100 m relay			DNF		did not advance	
Keneth Brackett; Jayson Jones; Linford Avila; Kenneth Medwood	4×400 m relay			DNF		did not advance	
Linford Avila	High jump					DNS	
Kenneth Blackett	Long jump	7.32 m.	16th PB			did not advance	

Women

Athlete	Event	Semifinals		Final	
Athlete	Event	Result	Rank	Result	Rank
Charnelle Enriquez	200 m	DNS		did not advance	
Julia McCord	200 m	33.01	14th	did not advance	
Charnelle Enriquez; Tricia Flores; Julia McCord; Kay-De Vaughn	4×100 m relay	DNS		did not advance	
Charnelle Enriquez; Tricia Flores; Julia McCord; Kay-De Vaughn	4×400 m relay	DNS		did not advance	
Tricia Flores	Long jump			5.88 m.	11th SB
Kay-De Vaughn	Triple jump			11.64 m.	14th
