= Belize at the Pan American Games =

- IOC code: BIZ
- NOC: Belize Olympic and Commonwealth Games Association
- Website: belizeolympicteam.com
- Medals Ranked 40th: Gold 0 Silver 0 Bronze 2 Total 2

Pan American Games appearances (overview)
- 1967; 1971; 1975; 1979; 1983; 1987; 1991; 1995; 1999; 2003; 2007; 2011; 2015; 2019; 2023

Belize has competed at every edition of the Pan American Games since the fifth edition of the multi-sport event in 1967. Belize did not compete at the first and only Pan American Winter Games in 1990. Belize's only two medals were won in softball.

== Medal count ==
To sort the tables by host city, total medal count, or any other column, click on the icon next to the column title.

=== Summer ===
Year	Ref.	Edition	Host city	Athletes	Rank	Gold	Silver	Bronze	Total
1951		I	(Argentina) Buenos Aires		Did not participate				
1955		II	Mexico City		Did not participate				
1959		III	(United States) Chicago		Did not participate				
1963		IV	(Brazil) São Paulo		Did not participate				
1967		V	(Canada) Winnipeg		—	0	0	0	0
1971		VI	(Colombia) Cali		—	0	0	0	0
1975		VII	Mexico City		—	0	0	0	0
1979		VIII	(Puerto Rico) San Juan		18th	0	0	1	1
1983		IX	(Venezuela) Caracas		20th	0	0	1	1
1987		X	(United States) Indianapolis		—	0	0	0	0
1991		XI	(Cuba) Havana		—	0	0	0	0
1995		XII	(Argentina) Mar del Plata		—	0	0	0	0
1999		XIII	(Canada) Winnipeg	3	—	0	0	0	0
2003		XIV	(Dominican Republic) Santo Domingo	7	—	0	0	0	0
2007		XV	(Brazil) Rio de Janeiro	7	—	0	0	0	0
2011		XVI	(Mexico) Guadalajara	10	—	0	0	0	0
2015		XVII	(Canada) Toronto	3	—	0	0	0	0
2019		XVIII	(Peru) Lima	6	—	0	0	0	0
2023		XIX	(Chile) Santiago	6	—	0	0	0	0
Total					40th	0	0	2	2

=== Winter ===
Year	Ref.	Edition	Host city	Rank	Gold	Silver	Bronze	Total
1990		I	(Argentina) Las Leñas	Did not participate				
Total				—	0	0	0	0

=== Medals by sport ===
Sport	Gold	Silver	Bronze	Total
Softball	0	0	2	2
Totals (1 entries)	0	0	2	2
