= Belize at the 2007 Pan American Games =

- IOC code: BIZ
- NOC: Belize Olympic and Commonwealth Games Association
- Website: belizeolympicteam.com

in Rio de Janeiro, Brazil 13–29 July 2007
- Competitors: 7 in 2 sports
- Flag bearer: Alfonso Martinez (opening)
- Medals Ranked 33rd: Gold 0 Silver 0 Bronze 0 Total 0

Pan American Games appearances (overview)
- 1967; 1971; 1975; 1979; 1983; 1987; 1991; 1995; 1999; 2003; 2007; 2011; 2015; 2019; 2023

Belize competed at the 2007 Pan American Games in Rio de Janeiro, Brazil from July 13 to 29, 2007. The Belize team consisted of seven athletes (four men and three women) competing in two sports: athletics (track and field) and taekwondo.

== Athletics (track and field) ==
Belize entered six athletes (three per gender).

Key

- Note–Ranks given for track events are for the entire round

Track event

Athlete	Event	Heats		Semifinals		Final	
Athlete	Event	Result	Rank	Result	Rank	Result	Rank
Lionel Jones	Men's 100 m	10.94	22	did not advance			
Jonathan Williams	Men's 400 m hurdles	49.84	9	—N/a		did not advance	
Tricia Flores	Women's 100 m	12.37	25	did not advance			
Kaina Martínez	Women's 200 m	25.66	23	did not advance			

Field Events

Athlete	Event	Qualification		Final	
Athlete	Event	Distance	Rank	Distance	Rank
Joel Wade	Men's long jump	5.97	20	did not advance	
Kay-de Vaughn	Women's high jump	—N/a		1.65	15

== Taekwondo ==
Belize entered one male taekwondo athlete.

Men

Athlete	Event	Round of 16	Quarterfinals	Semifinals	Repechage	Final / BM	Rank
Athlete	Event	Opposition Result	Opposition Result	Opposition Result	Opposition Result	Opposition Result	Rank
Alfonso Martinez	-58 kg	Figueroa (PUR); L 0–1	did not advance				

== See also ==
- Belize at the 2008 Summer Olympics
