= Alexa Irvin =

Canadian kayaker (born 1992)

Personal information
- Full name: Alexa Kaien Irvin
- Nationality: Canadian
- Born: July 21, 1992 (age 33) Prince Rupert, British Columbia
- Home town: Dartmouth, Nova Scotia
- Height: 1.75 m (5 ft 9 in)
- Weight: 70 kg (154 lb)

Sport
- Sport: Kayaking
- Event: K-4 500
- College team: Dalhousie University
Medal record
Kayaking
Representing Canada
Pan American Games
Gold medal – first place	2011 Guadalajara	K4 500 m
Gold medal – first place	2019 Lima	K4 500 m

Alexa Kaien Irvin (born July 21, 1992) is a Canadian sprint kayaker. She is the current Pan American Games champion in the women's K-4 500 metres, she won gold together with Andréanne Langlois, Alanna Bray-Lougheed, and Anna Negulic at the 2019 Pan American Games. Irvin also won gold in the K-4 500 metres at the 2011 Pan American Games.
