= Anna Negulic =

Canadian sprint kayaker

Personal information
- Born: July 20, 1998 (age 27) Bedford, Nova Scotia
- Height: 1.73 m (5 ft 8 in)
- Weight: 75 kg (165 lb)

Sport
- Sport: Kayaking
- Event: K-4 500
- College team: Dalhousie University
Medal record
Kayaking
Representing Canada
Pan American Games
Gold medal – first place	2019 Lima	K4 500 m

Anna Negulic (born 20 July 1988) is a Canadian sprint kayaker. She is the current Pan American Games champion in the women's K-4 500 metres, she won gold together with Andréanne Langlois, Alanna Bray-Lougheed, and Alexa Irvin at the 2019 Pan American Games.
