= Ariel Reboyras =

American politician

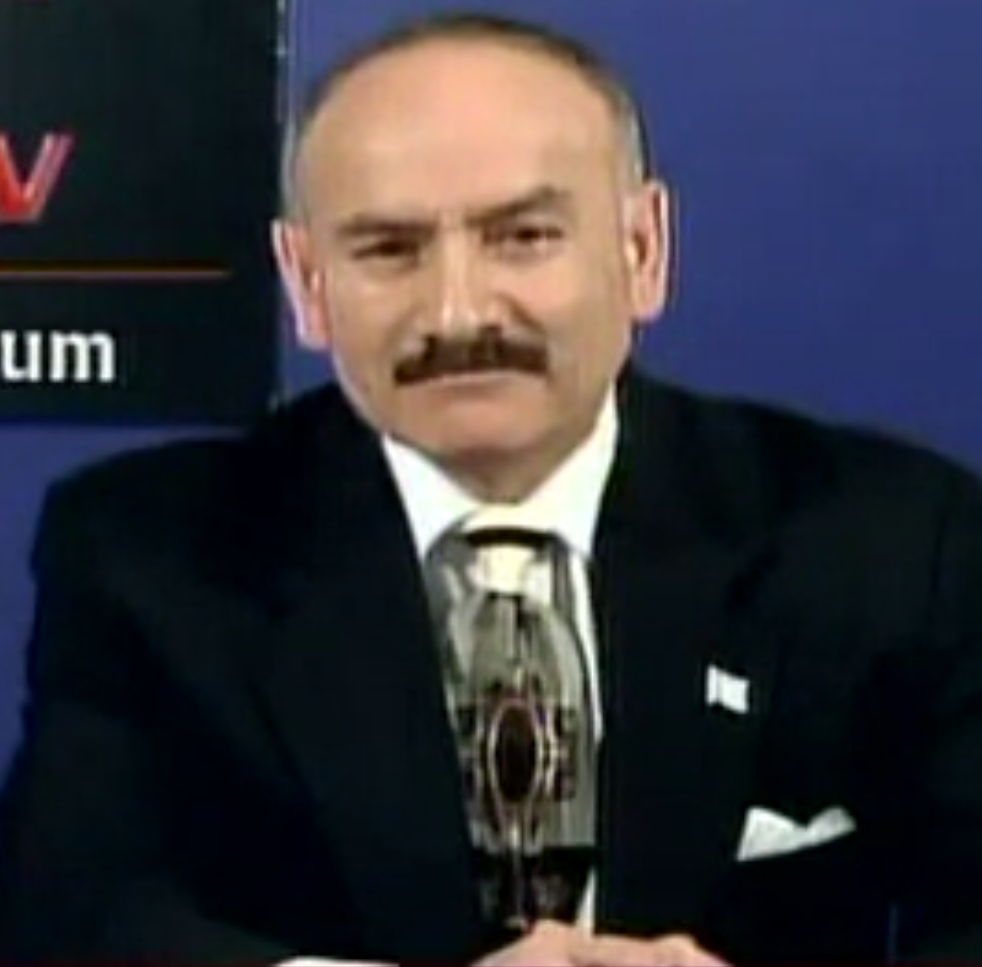

Member of the Chicago City Council from the 30th ward
- In office May 5, 2003 – May 15, 2023
- Preceded by: Mike Wojcik
- Succeeded by: Ruth Cruz

Personal details
- Born: August 7, 1953 (age 72) New York City, New York, U.S.
- Party: Democratic
- Spouse: Allie Reboyras (1980–present)
- Children: 2
- Education: University of Illinois, Chicago (BA)

Ariel Reboyras (born August 7, 1953) is alderman of the 30th ward of the City of Chicago; he was first elected in 2003. He was previously a deputy commissioner in the general service department.

== Early life ==
Ariel Reboyras was born in New York City in 1953. Of Puerto Rican descent, Reboyras moved to Chicago with his parents at the age of twelve. Reboyras attended the University of Illinois at Chicago where he was Co-Captain for the UIC Flames baseball team. After graduating with a Bachelor of Arts degree in Education, he taught at Roberto Clemente High School in Chicago's neighborhood of Humboldt Park.

== Career in Chicago government ==
Ariel began his career with the City of Chicago as a truck driver. Reboyras worked his way up into other areas of city government- first as an Equipment Dispatcher, then with the Tank Remediation Program for Fleet Management, an Equipment Coordinator for the Water Department where he assisted with design specifications for the Fleet Management Division, until finally being promoted to Deputy Commissioner for the Department of General Services.

In 2003 Reboyras ran for the seat previously held by Alderman Mike Wojcik in Chicago's 30th Ward. Reboyras won the election and was sworn in on May 7, 2003. Reboyras was later reelected to serve another term as alderman in 2007.

In 2010 Reboyras cosponsored an ordinance with 38th Ward Alderman Tom Allen that designated a stretch of Central Avenue in the vicinity of its intersection with Belmont Avenue as "Honorary Lech Kaczynski Way" to honor the Polish President who perished in the 2010 Polish Air Force Tu-154 crash.

As a member of the Chicago City Council, Reboyras serves on five committees: Committees, Rules and Ethics; Housing and Real Estate; License and Real Estate; Police and Fire; and Transportation and Public Way.

Reboyras is a member of the National Association of Latino Elected and Appointed Officials (NALEO).

Reboyras is also involved with a number of Chicago charities and non-profit organizations. These include the Active Transportation Alliance, Test Positive Aware Network's Ride for AIDS Chicago, the Healthy Streets Campaign, as well as local little league baseball and youth football programs. Reboyras was also the co-founder of the Northwest Youth Basketball Association and "Maraton San-Juan," an 8K Road Race held in conjunction with the Chicago Puerto Rican Parade.

Reboyras also serves as the Democratic Party Committeeman of the 30th Ward. He was first appointed on November 6, 2006, and was elected on February 5, 2008.
