= Belize at the 2003 Pan American Games =

- IOC code: BIZ
- NOC: Belize Olympic and Commonwealth Games Association
- Website: belizeolympicteam.com

in Santo Domingo 1–17 August 2003
- Competitors: 7 in 1 sport
- Flag bearer: Leonard Arnold
- Medals Ranked 33rd: Gold 0 Silver 0 Bronze 0 Total 0

Pan American Games appearances (overview)
- 1967; 1971; 1975; 1979; 1983; 1987; 1991; 1995; 1999; 2003; 2007; 2011; 2015; 2019; 2023

The 14th Pan American Games were held in Santo Domingo, Dominican Republic from August 1 to August 17, 2003. The team consisted of seven track and field athletes.

== Results by event ==
=== Athletics ===
Track

| Athlete | Event | Heat | | Final | |
| Athlete | Event | Time | Rank | Time | Rank |
|---|---|---|---|---|---|
| Michael Aguilar | Men's 400 m hurdles | 51.55 | 12 | — | 12 |
| Jayson Jones | 100 m | 10.82 | 6 | — | |
| Jayson Jones | 200 m | 21.80 | 7 | | |
| Patrick Fuller | 5,000 m | | | 14:39.23 | 8 |

== See also ==
- Belize at the 2004 Summer Olympics
