= Omira Estácia Neta =

Brazilian canoeist (born 1999)

Personal information
- Full name: Omira Maria Estácia Neta
- Nationality: Brazilian
- Born: 29 December 1999 (age 26) Iturama, Minas Gerais

Sport
- Country: Brazil
- Sport: Canoe slalom
- Event: C1, K1, Kayak cross
- Club: CESP - Foz do Iguaçu
Medal record
Women's canoe slalom
Representing Brazil
Pan American Games
Silver medal – second place	2023 Santiago	K1
South American Games
Gold medal – first place	2022 Asunción	K1
Gold medal – first place	2026 Santa Fe	Kayak cross
Gold medal – first place	2026 Santa Fe	Kayak cross time trial
Gold medal – first place	2026 Santa Fe	K1

Omira Estácia Neta (born 29 December 1999) is a Brazilian slalom canoeist.

== Career ==
Omira stood out in particular in the K-1 competition, achieving silver at the 2023 Pan American Games in Santiago as the most impressive result of her career. She also competed in the ICF Canoe Slalom World Championships since 2021.

== World Cup individual podiums ==
Season	Date	Venue	Position	Event
2018	1 July 2018	Kraków	2nd	Kayak cross

== Personal life ==
Estácia is the younger sister of the also canoeist Ana Sátila.
