= Alex Baldoni =

Canadian canoe slalom

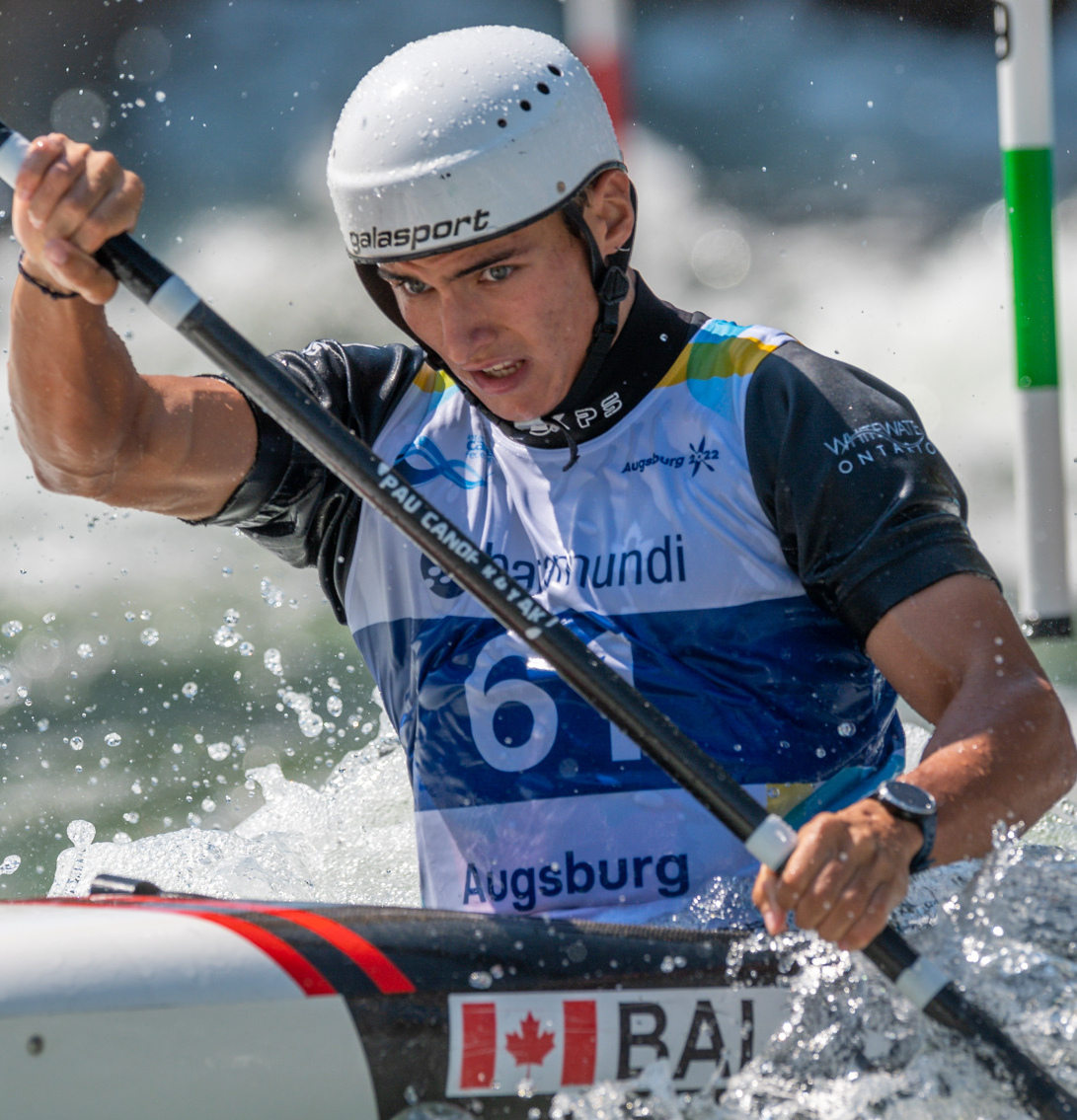
- Baldoni at the 2022 World Championships

Personal information
- Nationality: Canadian
- Born: December 27, 2003 (age 22) Pau, France

Sport
- Sport: Canoe slalom
Medal record
Men's canoe slalom
Representing Canada
Pan American Games
Silver medal – second place	2023 Santiago	Kayak cross

Alex Baldoni (born December 27, 2003) is a Canadian slalom canoeist.

Although Baldoni was born in France, he chose to represent the birth country of his mother.

== Career ==
Baldoni made his senior debut at the ICF World Championships in 2021. In September 2023, Baldoni was named to Canada's 2023 Pan American Games team. At the games, Baldoni won the silver medal in the kayak cross event, while finishing fifth in the C-1.

In June 2024, Baldoni was named to Canada's 2024 Olympic team. The games were Baldoni's Olympic debut. He competed in all three disciplines, finishing 15th in the C1 event, 21st in the K1 event and 29th in kayak cross.

== World Cup individual podiums ==
Season	Date	Venue	Position	Event
2025	31 August 2025	Tacen	3rd	Kayak cross
