= Beatriz Briones =

Mexican sprint kayaker (born 1999)

Personal information
- Full name: Beatriz de Lourdes Briones Fragoza
- Born: 10 February 1999 (age 27) Tijuana, Mexico

Sport
- Country: Mexico
- Sport: Kayaking
Medal record
Women's kayaking
Representing Mexico
World Championships
Bronze medal – third place	2022 Dartmouth	K-4 500 m
Pan American Games
Gold medal – first place	2019 Lima	K-1 500 m
Gold medal – first place	2023 Santiago	K-2 500 m
Gold medal – first place	2023 Santiago	K-4 500 m
Silver medal – second place	2019 Lima	K-4 500 m
Bronze medal – third place	2019 Lima	K-1 200 m
Bronze medal – third place	2019 Lima	K-2 500 m
Bronze medal – third place	2023 Santiago	K-1 500 m
Central American and Caribbean Games
Silver medal – second place	2018 Barranquilla	K-1 500 m

Beatriz de Lourdes Briones Fragoza (born 10 February 1999) is a Mexican sprint kayaker. She won a medal in all four women's kayaking competitions at the 2019 Pan American Games held in Lima, Peru.

In 2015, she competed in the women's K-4 500 metres at the Pan American Games without winning a medal.

== Personal life ==
Briones was born in Tijuana, though she moved to Monterrey at the age of 10.
