= Magdalena Garro =

Argentine canoeist

Personal information
- Full name: Maria Magdalena Garro
- Born: 18 February 1989 (age 37) Concepción del Uruguay, Argentina
- Height: 1.60 m (5 ft 3 in)
- Weight: 60 kg (132 lb)

Sport
- Country: Argentina
- Sport: Canoeing
Medal record
Representing Argentina
Pan American Games
Silver medal – second place	2019 Lima	K-2 500 m
Silver medal – second place	2023 Santiago	K-2 500 m
Bronze medal – third place	2015 Toronto	K-4 500 m
Bronze medal – third place	2019 Lima	K-4 500 m
South American Games
Gold medal – first place	2026 Santa Fe	K-2 500 m
Gold medal – first place	2026 Santa Fe	K-4 500 m

Maria Magdalena Garro (born 18 February 1989) is an Argentine Olympic canoeist. She represented her country at the 2016 Summer Olympics.
