= Ana Paula Vergutz =

Brazilian canoeist (born 1989)

Personal information
- Born: 20 April 1989 (age 37) Cascavel, Brazil

Sport
- Sport: Canoe sprint
- Club: Clube de Regatas Cascave
Medal record
Women's canoe sprint
Representing Brazil
Pan American Games
Bronze medal – third place	2015 Toronto	K-1 500 m
Bronze medal – third place	2019 Lima	K-1 500 m
South American Games
Silver medal – second place	2026 Santa Fe	K-1 500 m
Silver medal – second place	2026 Santa Fe	K-2 500 m
Bronze medal – third place	2026 Santa Fe	Mixed K-2 500 m

Ana Paula Vergutz (born 20 April 1989) is a Brazilian canoeist. She competed in the women's K-1 200 metres event at the 2016 Summer Olympics. She also competed for Brazil at the 2024 Summer Olympics.
