= Ruth Cruz =

American politician

Member of the Chicago City Council from the 30th ward
- Incumbent
- Assumed office May 15, 2023
- Preceded by: Ariel Reboyras

Personal details
- Born: 1983 or 1984 (age 42–43)
- Party: Democratic
- Education: Robert Morris University (BA, MA)

Ruth Cruz (born 1983 or 1984) is an American politician from Chicago. She is the alderperson for Chicago City Council's 30th ward, having won the 2023 election to the office. The 30th ward includes parts of the Portage Park, Belmont Cragin, and Irving Park neighborhoods.

== Early life, education, and career ==
Cruz was born in Mexico and immigrated to Chicago with her family when she was seven years old. She attended Carl Schurz High School and earned a bachelor's degree in business administration and a master's degree in management at Robert Morris University. She later worked as director of admissions at Robert Morris and an assistant admissions director at Roosevelt University. She was a volunteer at a restorative justice court in Avondale and was an elected member of a local school council in Portage Park.

She ran for alderperson of the 30th ward in the 2023 election, where incumbent Ariel Reboyras had announced his retirement. She identified as a progressive and supported policies such as "community zoning, participatory budgeting and more investment in youth and violence prevention programs that emphasize mental health for residents, kids and law enforcement." She won 27% of the vote in the first round election on February 28, and advanced to a runoff against Jessica Gutiérrez. She won the runoff election on April 5 with 51.5% of the vote.

== Personal life ==
Cruz has two children.

== See also ==
- List of Chicago alderpersons since 1923
