= Guilherme Mapelli =

Brazilian canoeist (born 1994)

Personal information
- Full name: Guilherme Marcelo Mapelli
- Nationality: Brazilian
- Born: 23 August 1994 (age 32) Americana

Sport
- Country: Brazil
- Sport: Canoe slalom
- Event: K1, Kayak cross
Medal record
Men's canoe slalom
Representing Brazil
Pan American Games
Gold medal – first place	2023 Santiago	Kayak Cross
Junior World Championships
Bronze medal – third place	2015 Foz do Iguaçu	K1 Team
Pan American Championships
Gold medal – first place	2018 Três Coroas	Extreme Cross
South American Championships
Gold medal – first place	2018 Três Coroas	K1

Guilherme Marcelo Mapelli (born 23 August 1994 in Americana) is a Brazilian slalom canoeist.

== Career ==
Mapelli was born in Americana, São Paulo, but has lived in Três Coroas, Rio Grande do Sul, since he was very young. His history in canoeing began around the age of 13, when he had to take a break from practicing the sport to work. After that, he never stopped and officially started competing again in 2007, in São Paulo, where he won his first medal in the city of Cerquilho. Four years later, he was Junior South American champion, in San Rafael, Argentina. This participation in an international competition was fundamental for his progress in canoeing. From then on, Mapelli won an international athlete fund and with this he began to buy his equipment, investing more in his career. In 2014, he came 2nd in the Brazilian Championship held in the city where he was living (Três Coroas), and soon after, in 2015, he joined the Brazilian team. In 2015, he won bronze at the 2015 World Junior and U23 Canoe Slalom Championships in Foz do Iguaçu. He placed 10th in the individual (2015 – 2016) under-23 and in 2017, bronze in the Pan American in Costa Rica. In 2018, Mapelli won a Pan American championship in extreme kayaking, was South American champion in the senior K1 category and placed third in the Brazilian Championship, also in senior K1.

At the 2016 World Junior and U23 Canoe Slalom Championships held in Poland, he finished 10th in the K1 final.

In 2018, the Pan American Canoeing Slalom Championships and the South American Canoeing Slalom Championships were held (at the same time) in Três Coroas. Guilherme Mapelli was champion in the South American K1 Senior Championship and the Pan American Extreme Cross Senior Championship.

He participated at the 2023 ICF Canoe Slalom World Championships held in London.

At the 2023 Pan American Games held in Santiago, Chile, he won his biggest title at the Men's kayak cross, where he won the gold medal.

In 2023, Guilherme Mapelli was also working as a coach, heading a base school in Três Coroas.
