= Nadia Riquelme =

Argentine slalom kayaker

Personal information
- Born: 15 June 1986 (age 40)

Sport
- Country: Argentina
- Sport: Slalom kayak
Medal record
Women's slalom kayak
Representing Argentina
Pan American Games
Silver medal – second place	2019 Lima	K-1

Nadia Riquelme (born 15 June 1986) is an Argentine slalom kayaker. In 2019, she won the silver medal in the women's K-1 event at the 2019 Pan American Games held in Lima, Peru.
