= Alanna Bray-Lougheed =

Canadian sprint kayaker (born 1993)

Personal information
- Born: February 24, 1993 (age 33) Oakville, Ontario
- Height: 1.70 m (5 ft 7 in)
- Weight: 62 kg (137 lb)

Sport
- Sport: Kayaking
- Event: K-1 200, K-1 500, K-2 500, K-2 1000, K-4 500
- College team: Mount Saint Vincent University
Medal record
Kayaking
Representing Canada
Pan American Games
Gold medal – first place	2019 Lima	K2 500 m
Gold medal – first place	2019 Lima	K4 500 m

Alanna Bray-Lougheed (born February 24, 1993, in Oakville, Ontario) is a Canadian sprint kayaker. She is the current Pan American Games champion in the women's K-2 500 m with Andréanne Langlois, as well as in the K-4 500 metres with Langlois, Anna Negulic, and Alexa Irvin. Bray-Lougheed was selected by the RBC Training Ground program, an elite Olympic athlete training and identification program for Canada, and joined the Canadian national team in 2015. She competed in the 2017 ICF Canoe Sprint World Championships, her first World Championships, and made the A Final in the K-2 1,000 m, finishing sixth.

In March 2021, Bray-Lougheed was named to Canada's 2020 Olympic team.
