= Brenda Rojas =

Argentine canoeist (born 1995)

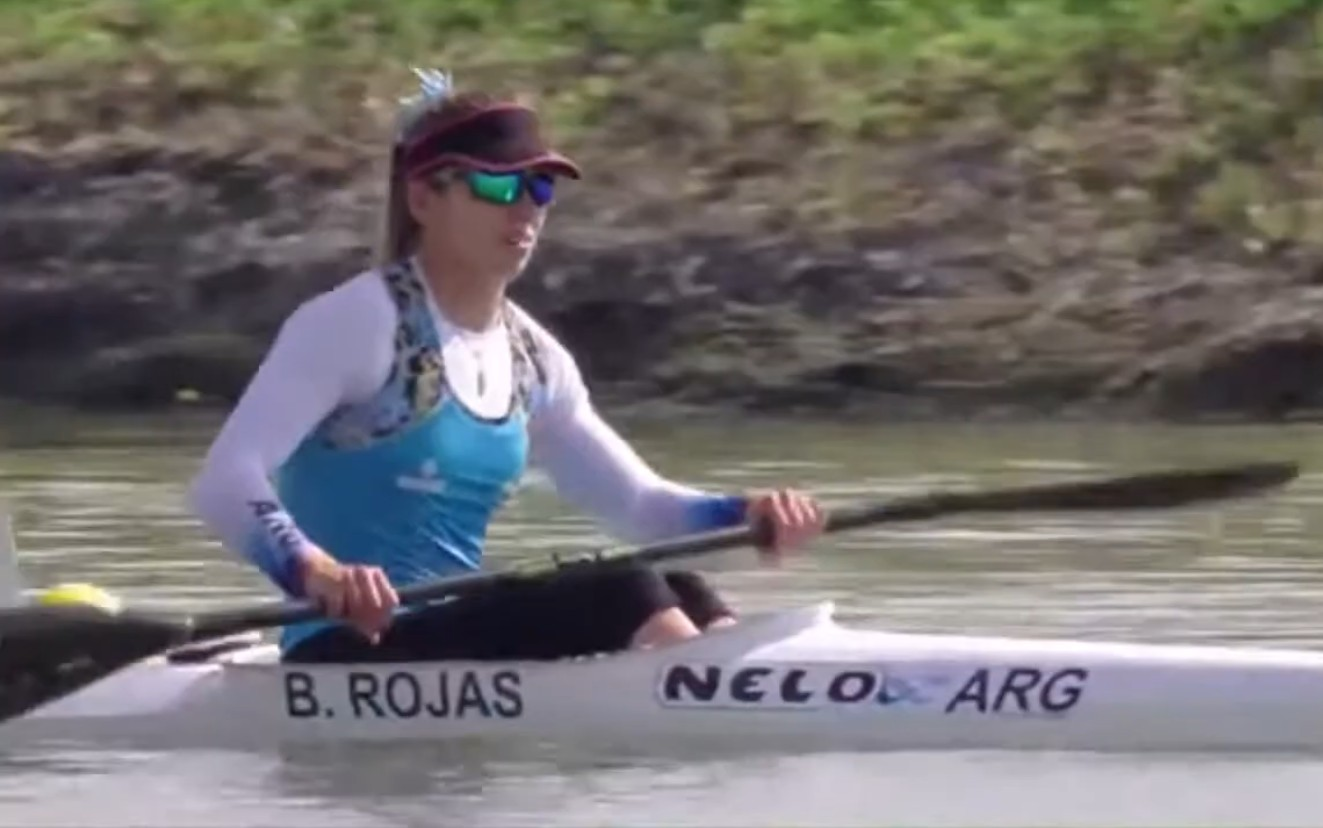

Personal information
- Full name: Brenda Eliana Rojas
- Born: 15 October 1995 (age 31) San Martín de los Andes, Argentina
- Height: 1.66 m (5 ft 5 in)
- Weight: 64 kg (141 lb)

Sport
- Country: Argentina
- Sport: Canoeing
Medal record
Representing Argentina
Pan American Games
Silver medal – second place	2019 Lima	K-2 500 m
Silver medal – second place	2023 Santiago	K-1 500 m
Silver medal – second place	2023 Santiago	K-2 500 m
Bronze medal – third place	2015 Toronto	K-4 500 m
Bronze medal – third place	2019 Lima	K-4 500 m
South American Games
Gold medal – first place	2026 Santa Fe	K-1 200 m
Gold medal – first place	2026 Santa Fe	K-1 500 m
Gold medal – first place	2026 Santa Fe	K-2 500 m
Gold medal – first place	2026 Santa Fe	Mixed K-2 500 m

Brenda Eliana Rojas (born 15 October 1995) is an Argentine Olympic canoeist. She represented her country at the 2016 Summer Olympics. She also competed at the 2020 Summer Olympics.

She competed at the 2019 Pan American Games, in Women K2 500m, winning a silver medal, and Women K4 500m, winning a bronze medal.
