= Pepe Gonçalves =

Brazilian canoeist (born 1993)

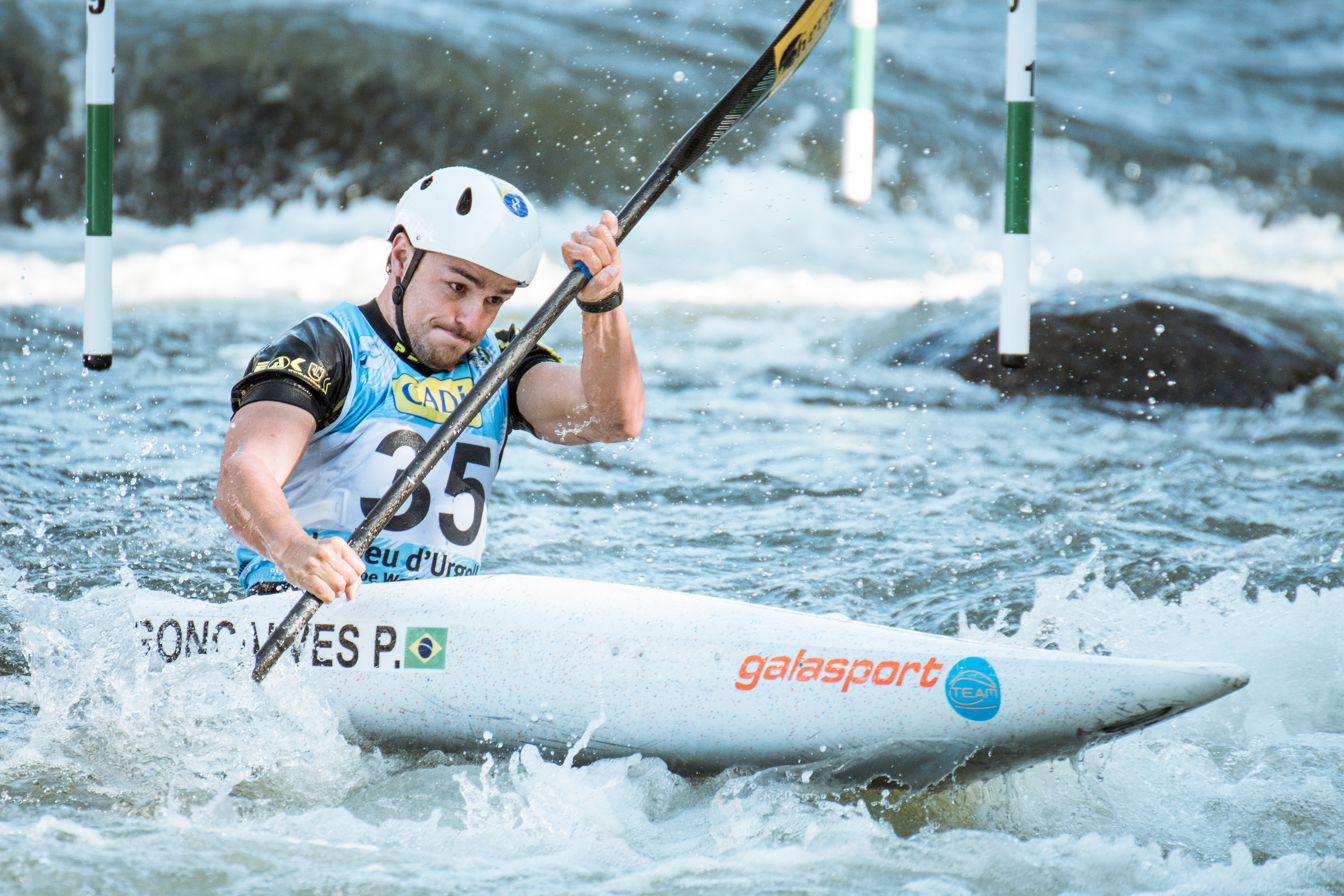
- Gonçalves in 2019

Personal information
- Full name: Pedro Henrique Gonçalves da Silva
- Nationality: Brazilian
- Born: 12 April 1993 (age 33) Ipaussu, São Paulo
- Height: 1.76 m (5 ft 9 in)
- Weight: 71 kg (157 lb)

Sport
- Country: Brazil
- Sport: Canoe slalom
- Event: K1, C1, Kayak cross
Medal record
Men's canoe slalom
Representing Brazil
World Championships
Bronze medal – third place	2019 Prague	Kayak cross
Pan American Games
Gold medal – first place	2019 Lima	K1
Gold medal – first place	2019 Lima	Kayak cross
Silver medal – second place	2015 Toronto	K1
Silver medal – second place	2023 Santiago	K1
South American Games
Gold medal – first place	2022 Asunción	K1
Gold medal – first place	2022 Asunción	Kayak cross
U23 World Championships
Bronze medal – third place	2015 Foz do Iguaçu	K1 team

Pedro Henrique Gonçalves da Silva (born 12 April 1993 in Ipaussu), better known as Pepe Gonçalves, is a Brazilian slalom canoeist who has competed at the international level since 2009.

== Early life ==
Raised in Piraju, da Silva got interested in canoeing after seeing the Brazilian team that would participate in the 2004 Summer Olympics practice in his city. He joined a social project that taught the sport in the Paranapanema River and got moved to sailing for a year due to his low stature, but his abilities in the kayak soon convinced his teachers. Once moved from sprint to slalom, Gonçalves won his first Brazilian championship in 2011, and nearly qualified for the 2012 Summer Olympics - missing the qualifying time by 0.13 seconds.

== Career ==
At the 2015 Pan American Games, in his first participation in Pans, he obtained the silver medal in the K1 category. In the same year, he won bronze in the 2015 World Junior and U23 Canoe Slalom Championships.

Gonçalves won a bronze medal in the kayak cross event at the 2019 World Championships in Prague. He also won the overall World Cup title in kayak cross in 2019.

Gonçalves competed at three Olympic Games. He finished 6th in the K1 event at the 2016 Summer Olympics in Rio de Janeiro, the best result the country ever had in this sport. He then competed at the delayed 2020 Summer Olympics in Tokyo, where he finished 19th in the K1 event after being eliminated in the semifinal. He also competed at the 2024 Summer Olympics in Paris, finishing 18th in the C1 event, 20th in the K1 event and 27th in kayak cross.

At the 2022 South American Games, he won two gold medals, in K1 and kayak cross.

At the 2023 Pan American Games he won a silver medal in the K1 event.

== World Cup individual podiums ==
Season	Date	Venue	Position	Event
2016	3 September 2016	Prague	3rd	Kayak cross^{1}
2019	23 June 2019	Bratislava	2nd	Kayak cross
2019	30 June 2019	Tacen	2nd	Kayak cross
2019	8 September 2019	Prague	3rd	Kayak cross^{2}
2020	17 October 2020	Tacen	3rd	K1
2020	17 October 2020	Tacen	1st	Kayak cross
2021	20 June 2021	Markkleeberg	1st	Kayak cross
2022	12 June 2022	Prague	3rd	Kayak cross
2022	28 August 2022	Pau	3rd	Kayak cross
2024	22 September 2024	La Seu d'Urgell	3rd	Kayak cross

^{1} Although the K1 cross events were contested, no World Cup points were awarded
^{2} World Championship counting for World Cup points

== Personal life ==
He lives in Foz do Iguaçu, where he trains and studies physiotherapy.

== Controversy ==
During the 2016 Olympics, he made news for being brought by diver Ingrid de Oliveira to her bedroom, causing tension between Oliveira and her partner Giovanna Pedroso as both would compete in the women's 10-meter synchronized platform dive the next day.
