= Andréanne Langlois =

Canadian sprint kayaker

Personal information
- Nationality: Canadian
- Born: April 1, 1993 (age 33) Quebec City, Quebec
- Height: 1.54 m (5 ft 1 in)
- Weight: 52 kg (115 lb)

Sport
- Sport: Kayaking
- Event: K-1 200, K-1 500, K-2 500, K-4 500
- College team: Université Laval
Medal record
Sprint kayak
Representing Canada
World Championships
Bronze medal – third place	2022 Dartmouth	K-2 200 m
Pan American Games
Gold medal – first place	2019 Lima	K2 500 m
Gold medal – first place	2019 Lima	K4 500 m
Silver medal – second place	2019 Lima	K1 200 m
Silver medal – second place	2019 Lima	K1 500 m

Andréanne Langlois (born April 1, 1993) is a Canadian sprint kayaker. She is the current Pan American Games champion in the women's K-2 500 m with Alanna Bray-Lougheed, as well as in the K-4 500 metres. She also added two individual Pan American Games silvers in 2019 in both the K-1 200 m, and K-1 500 m. Langlois competed as part of Canada's Olympic team at 2016 Rio Olympics.

In March 2021, Langlois was named to Canada's 2020 Olympic team.
