= List of Pan American Games medalists in canoeing =

This is the complete list of Pan American Games medalists in the canoeing program, which includes kayaking, from 1987 to 2023.

== Men's events ==
=== C-1 200 metres ===
| Games | Gold | Silver | Bronze |
|---|---|---|---|
| 2011 | Richard Dalton; Canada | Nivalter Jesus; Brazil | Roleysi Baez; Cuba |
| 2015 | Isaquias Queiroz; Brazil | Jason McCoombs; Canada | Arnold Rodriguez; Cuba |

=== C-1 500 metres ===
| Games | Gold | Silver | Bronze |
|---|---|---|---|
| 1987 | Jim Terrell; United States | Stephen Wasteneys; Canada | Jorge Montero; Cuba |
| 1991 | Armando Silega; Cuba | Paul Pageau; Canada | Ramón Ferrer; Mexico |
| 1995 | Jim Terrell; United States | Attila Buday; Canada | Juan Martínez; Mexico |
| 1999 | Ledis Balceiro; Cuba | Stephen Giles; Canada | Jim Terrell; United States |
| 2003 | Karel Aguilar Chacón; Cuba | Scott Dickey; Canada | Francisco Caputitla; Mexico |
| 2007 | Everardo Cristóbal; Mexico | Aldo Pruna Díaz; Cuba | Nivalter Jesus; Brazil |

=== C-1 1000 metres ===
| Games | Gold | Silver | Bronze |
|---|---|---|---|
| 1987 | Bruce Merritt; United States | Armando Silega; Cuba | Stephen Wasteneys; Canada |
| 1991 | Armando Silega; Cuba | Paul Pageau; Canada | Fred Spaulding; United States |
| 1995 | Ledis Balceiro; Cuba | Juan Martínez; Mexico | Dan Howe; Canada |
| 1999 | Stephen Giles; Canada | Ledis Balceiro; Cuba | José Romero; Mexico |
| 2003 | Tom Hall; Canada | José Romero; Mexico | Darwin Correa; Uruguay |
| 2007 | Everardo Cristóbal; Mexico | Reydel Ramos; Cuba | Benjamin Russell; Canada |
| 2011 | Everardo Cristóbal; Mexico | Reydel Ramos; Cuba | Johnnathan Tafra; Chile |
| 2015 | Isaquias Queiroz; Brazil | Mark Oldershaw; Canada | Everardo Cristóbal; Mexico |
| 2019 | Isaquias Queiroz; Brazil | Fernando Jorge; Cuba | Drew Hodges; Canada |
| 2023 | José Ramón Pelier; Cuba | Isaquias Queiroz; Brazil | Connor Fitzpatrick; Canada |

=== C-2 500 metres ===
| Games | Gold | Silver | Bronze |
|---|---|---|---|
| 1987 | Cuba | Canada | United States |
| 1991 | Cuba; Juan Aballí; Fernando Zamora | Mexico | Canada |
| 1995 | Canada | Mexico | Cuba |
| 1999 | Cuba | Canada | United States; Jordan Malloch; Nate Johnson |
| 2007 | Cuba; Karel Aguilar Chacón; Serguey Torres | Mexico; Gilberto Soriano; Everardo Cristóbal | Brazil; Vilson Nascimento; Wladimir Moreno |
| 2003 | Cuba; Ledis Balceiro; Ibrahim Rojas | Mexico; Cristian Dehesa; José Romero | Canada; Ian Mortimer; Tom Hall |
| 2023 | Canada; Craig Spence; Alix Plomteux | Brazil; Evandilson Avelar; Filipe Santana | Cuba; José Ramón Pelier; Javier Requeiro |

=== C-2 1000 metres ===
| Games | Gold | Silver | Bronze |
|---|---|---|---|
| 1991 | Cuba | Mexico; Ramón Ferrer; Antonio Romero | Canada |
| 1995 | Cuba | Canada | Mexico |
| 1999 | Cuba | Canada | United States; Jordan Malloch; Nate Johnson |
| 2003 | Cuba; Ledis Balceiro; Ibrahim Rojas | Chile; Fabian López; Johnnathan Tafra | Mexico; Cristian Dehesa; José Romero |
| 2007 | Cuba; Karel Aguilar Chacón; Serguey Torres | Brazil; Vilson Nascimento; Wladimir Moreno | Venezuela; Eduard Paredes; José Silva |
| 2011 | Cuba; Karel Aguilar Chacón; Serguey Torres | Brazil; Erlon Silva; Ronilson Oliveira | Venezuela; Ronny Ratia; Anderson Ramos |
| 2015 | Canada; Benjamin Russell; Gabriel Beauchesne-Sévigny | Brazil; Erlon Silva; Isaquias Queiroz | Cuba; Serguey Torres; José Carlos Bulnes |
| 2019 | Cuba; Serguey Torres; Fernando Jorge | Canada; Craig Spence; Drew Hodges | Mexico; Guillermo Quirino; Rigoberto Camilo |

=== K-1 200 metres ===
| Games | Gold | Silver | Bronze |
|---|---|---|---|
| 2011 | César de Cesare; Ecuador | Miguel Correa; Argentina | Ryan Dolan; United States |
| 2015 | Mark de Jonge; Canada | Edson Da Silva; Brazil | César de Cesare; Ecuador |
| 2019 | Dominik Crête; Canada | César de Cesare; Ecuador | Rubén Rézola; Argentina |

=== K-1 500 metres ===
| Games | Gold | Silver | Bronze |
|---|---|---|---|
| 1987 | Norman Bellingham; United States | Luis Pérez; Cuba | Jeff Houser; Canada |
| 1991 | Ángel Pérez; Cuba | Mike Herbert; United States | Scott Kerrigan; Canada |
| 1995 | Peter Newton; United States | Emmanuel Auger; Canada | Sergio Mangín; Argentina |
| 1999 | Javier Correa; Argentina | Peter Newton; United States | Carlos Campos; Brazil |
| 2003 | Javier Correa; Argentina | Sebastián Cuattrin; Brazil | Mark de Jonge; Canada |
| 2007 | Manuel Cortina; Mexico | Angus Mortimer; Canada | Edson Silva; Brazil |

=== K-1 1000 metres ===
| Games | Gold | Silver | Bronze |
|---|---|---|---|
| 1987 | Greg Barton; United States | Jorge García; Cuba | Atilio Vásquez; Argentina |
| 1991 | Mike Herbert; United States | Ángel Pérez; Cuba | Peter Giles; Canada |
| 1995 | Abelardo Sztrum; Argentina | Peter Newton; United States | Sebastián Cuattrin; Brazil |
| 1999 | Javier Correa; Argentina | Sebastián Cuattrin; Brazil | Adrian Richardson; Canada |
| 2003 | Javier Correa; Argentina | Sebastián Cuattrin; Brazil | Rami Zur; United States |
| 2007 | Angus Mortimer; Canada | Sebastián Cuattrin; Brazil | Jorge García; Cuba |
| 2011 | Jorge García; Cuba | Daniel Dal Bo; Argentina | Philippe Duchesneau; Canada |
| 2015 | Jorge García; Cuba | Daniel Dal Bo; Argentina | Adam van Koeverden; Canada |
| 2019 | Agustín Vernice; Argentina | Marshall Hughes; Canada | Vagner Souta; Brazil |
| 2023 | Agustín Vernice; Argentina | Jonas Ecker; United States | Valentín Rossi; Argentina |

=== K-2 200 metres ===
| Games | Gold | Silver | Bronze |
|---|---|---|---|
| 2011 | Canada; Ryan Cochrane; Hugues Fournel | Argentina; Miguel Correa; Rubén Rézola | Brazil; Givago Ribeiro; Gilvan Ribeiro |
| 2015 | Argentina; Ezequiel Di Giacomo; Rubén Rézola | Cuba; Fidel Vargas; Reiner Torres | Brazil; Hans Heinrich Mallmann; Edson Freitas da Silva |
| 2015 | Argentina; Ezequiel Di Giacomo; Rubén Rézola | Cuba; Fidel Vargas; Reiner Torres | Canada; Mark de Jonge; Pierre-Luc Poulin |

=== K-2 500 metres ===
| Games | Gold | Silver | Bronze |
|---|---|---|---|
| 1987 | United States | Cuba | Canada |
| 1991 | Cuba | United States | Argentina |
| 1995 | United States | Cuba | Argentina |
| 1999 | United States | Argentina | Brazil; Sebastián Cuattrin; Carlos Campos |
| 2003 | Brazil; Carlos Campos; Fábio Demarchi | Argentina; Miguel Correa; Fernando Redondo | Mexico; Manuel Cortina; Ricardo Reza |
| 2007 | Mexico; Jesús Váldez; Manuel Cortina | Cuba; Jorge García; Maikel Zulueta | Argentina; Pablo de Torres; Juan Pablo Bergero |
| 2023 | Canada; Ian Gaudet; Simon McTavish | Argentina; Gonzalo Lo Moro; Agustín Vernice | United States; Jonas Ecker; Aaron Small |

=== K-2 1000 metres ===
| Games | Gold | Silver | Bronze |
|---|---|---|---|
| 1987 | United States | Cuba | Canada |
| 1991 | Cuba | Argentina | Canada |
| 1995 | Argentina | Cuba | Brazil; Sebastián Cuattrin; Álvaro Koslowski |
| 1999 | Argentina | Brazil; Sebastián Cuattrin; Carlos Campos | Cuba |
| 2003 | Cuba; Lancy Martínez; Yoel Mendoza | United States; Benjie Lewis; Brandon Woods | Brazil; Roger Caumo; Fábio Demarchi |
| 2007 | Mexico; Jesús Váldez; Manuel Cortina | Argentina; Pablo de Torres; Juan Pablo Bergero | Venezuela; José Ramos; Gabriel Rodríguez |
| 2011 | Canada; Steven Jorens; Richard Dessureault-Dober | Cuba; Reiner Torres; Jorge Antonio Garcia | Argentina; Pablo de Torres; Roberto Geringer Sallette |
| 2015 | Cuba; Jorge Garcia; Reiner Torres | Argentina; Pablo de Torres; Gonzalo Carreras | Brazil; Celso Oliveira; Vagner Souta |
| 2019 | Argentina; Manuel Lascano; Agustín Vernice | Canada; Jacob Steele; Jarret Kenke | Mexico; Oabaldo Fuentes; Mauricio Figueroa |

=== K-4 500 metres ===
| Games | Gold | Silver | Bronze |
|---|---|---|---|
| 1991 | Cuba | United States | Argentina |
| 1995 | Cuba | United States | Argentina |
| 2019 | Argentina; Manuel Lascano; Juan Ignacio Cáceres; Ezequiel Di Giacomo; Gonzalo Carreras | Cuba; Reinier Carrera; Renier Mora; Robert Benítez; Fidel Antonio Vargas | Mexico; Javier López; Juan Rodríguez; Mauricio Figueroa; Osbaldo Fuentes |
| 2023 | Argentina; Agustín Vernice; Manuel Lascano; Gonzalo Lo Moro; Gonzalo Carreras | Canada; Nicholas Matveev; Pierre-Luc Poulin; Laurent Lavigne; Simon McTavish | United States; Nathan Humberston; Sean Talbert; Cole Jones; Augustus Cook |

=== K-4 1000 metres ===
| Games | Gold | Silver | Bronze |
|---|---|---|---|
| 1987 | United States | Cuba | Argentina |
| 1991 | Cuba | United States | Canada |
| 1995 | Cuba | United States | Argentina |
| 1999 | United States | Cuba | Brazil; Sebastián Cuattrin; Carlos Campos; André Lúcio Kaye; Roger Caumo |
| 2003 | Cuba; Oslay Calzadilla; Andi Sicilia; Lancy Martínez; Yoel Mendoza | Brazil; Sebastian Szubski; Carlos Campos; André Caye; Sebastián Cuattrin | Argentina; Damian Dossena; Rodrigo Caffa; Fernando Redondo; Miguel Correa |
| 2007 | Brazil; Roberto Maheler; Carlos Campos; Sebastián Cuattrin; Edson Silva | Canada; Chris Pellini; Angus Mortimer; Mark de Jonge; Jeremy Bordeleau | Cuba; Eliecer Rodríguez; Maikel Zulueta; Jorge García; Carlos Montalvo |
| 2011 | Cuba; Osvaldo Labrada; Jorge Antonio Garcia; Reiner Torres; Maikel Daniel Zulueta | Canada; Richard Dessureault-Dober; Philippe Duchesneau; Steven Jorens; Connor Taras | Brazil; Celso Oliveira; Roberto Maheler; Gilvan Ribeiro; Givago Ribeiro |
| 2015 | Cuba; Jorge Garcia; Renier Mora; Reiner Torres; Alex Menendez | Brazil; Roberto Maehler; Vagner Souta; Celso Oliveira; Gilvan Ribeiro | Argentina; Daniel Dal Bo; Juan Ignacio Cáceres; Pablo de Torres; Gonzalo Carreras |

=== C-1 Slalom ===
| Games | Gold | Silver | Bronze |
|---|---|---|---|
| 2015 | Casey Eichfeld; United States | Cameron Smedley; Canada | Felipe Borges; Brazil |
| 2019 | Zachary Lokken; United States | Sebastián Rossi; Argentina | Felipe Borges; Brazil |
| 2023 | Zachary Lokken; United States | Kauã da Silva; Brazil | Leonardo Curcel; Paraguay |

=== C-2 Slalom ===
| Games | Gold | Silver | Bronze |
|---|---|---|---|
| 2015 | United States; Devin McEwan; Casey Eichfeld | Brazil; Charles Corrêa; Anderson Oliveira | Argentina; Lucas Rossi; Sebastián Rossi |

=== K-1 Slalom ===
| Games | Gold | Silver | Bronze |
|---|---|---|---|
| 2015 | Michal Smolen; United States | Pepe Gonçalves; Brazil | Ben Hayward; Canada |
| 2019 | Pepe Gonçalves; Brazil | Lucas Rossi; Argentina | Keenan Simpson; Canada |
| 2023 | Joshua Joseph; United States | Pepe Gonçalves; Brazil | Mael Rivard; Canada |

=== K-1 Extreme Slalom ===
| Games | Gold | Silver | Bronze |
|---|---|---|---|
| 2019 | Pepe Gonçalves; Brazil | Joshua Joseph; United States | Keenan Simpson; Canada |

=== K-1 Kayak Cross ===
| Games | Gold | Silver | Bronze |
|---|---|---|---|
| 2023 | Guilherme Mapelli; Brazil | Alex Baldoni; Canada | Eriberto Gutiérrez; Peru |

== Women's events ==
=== C-1 200 metres ===
| Games | Gold | Silver | Bronze |
|---|---|---|---|
| 2015 | Laurence Vincent Lapointe; Canada | Anggie Avegno; Ecuador | Valdenice Conceição; Brazil |
| 2019 | Nevin Harrison; United States | María Mailliard; Chile | Mayvihanet Borges; Cuba |
| 2023 | Yarisleidis Cirilo; Cuba | María Mailliard; Chile | Sophia Jensen; Canada |

=== C-2 500 metres ===
| Games | Gold | Silver | Bronze |
|---|---|---|---|
| 2019 | Cuba; Mayvihanet Borges; Katherin Nuevo | Chile; Karen Roco; María Mailliard | Canada; Anne Lavoie-Parent; Rowan Hardy-Kavanagh |
| 2023 | Canada; Sloan MacKenzie; Katie Vincent | Chile; María Mailliard; Paula Gómez | Colombia; Madison Velásquez; Manuela Gómez |

=== K-1 200 metres ===
| Games | Gold | Silver | Bronze |
|---|---|---|---|
| 2011 | Carrie Johnson; United States | Darisleydis Amador; Cuba | Sabrina Ameghino; Argentina |
| 2015 | Yusmari Mengana; Cuba | Michelle Russell; Canada | Sabrina Ameghino; Argentina |
| 2019 | Sabrina Ameghino; Argentina | Andréanne Langlois; Canada | Beatriz Briones; Mexico |

=== K-1 500 metres ===
| Games | Gold | Silver | Bronze |
|---|---|---|---|
| 1987 | Traci Phillips; United States | Erika Revesz; Canada | Verónica Arbo; Argentina |
| 1991 | Corrina Kennedy; Canada | Tatiana Valdés; Cuba | Megan Duffy; United States |
| 1995 | Alexandra Harbold; United States | Erika Duron; Mexico | Anmary López; Cuba |
| 1999 | Karen Furneaux; Canada | Kathryn Colin; United States | Mariela Suárez; Cuba |
| 2003 | Ruth Nortje; United States | Fernanda Lauro; Argentina | Jillian D'Alessio; Canada |
| 2007 | Jillian D'Alessio; Canada | Fernanda Lauro; Argentina | Anca Mateescu; Mexico |
| 2011 | Carrie Johnson; United States | Émilie Fournel; Canada | Alexandra Keresztesi; Argentina |
| 2015 | Yusmari Mengana; Cuba | Michelle Russell; Canada | Ana Paula Vergutz; Brazil |
| 2019 | Beatriz Briones; Mexico | Andréanne Langlois; Canada | Ana Paula Vergutz; Brazil |
| 2023 | Michelle Russell; Canada | Brenda Rojas; Argentina | Beatriz Briones; Mexico |

=== K-2 500 metres ===
| Games | Gold | Silver | Bronze |
|---|---|---|---|
| 1987 | United States | Canada | Argentina; Corina Martín; María Miliauro |
| 1991 | Canada | United States | Cuba |
| 1995 | United States | Canada | Mexico; Renata Hernández; Sandra Rojas |
| 1999 | Canada | United States | Cuba |
| 2003 | United States; Ruth Nortje; Kathryn Colin | Canada; Émilie Fournel; Victoria Tuttle | Argentina; Sabrina Ameghino; María Romano |
| 2007 | Canada; Kia Byers; Marie-Christine Schmidt | Cuba; Yulitza Meneses; Lianet Álvarez | Venezuela; Ladymar Hernández; Eliana Escalona |
| 2011 | Cuba; Dayexi Gandarela; Yulitza Meneses | Argentina; Sabrina Ameghino; Alexandra Keresztesi | United States; Maggie Hogan; Kaitlyn McElroy |
| 2015 | Cuba; Yusmari Mengana; Yurieni Guerra | Argentina; Sabrina Ameghino; Alexandra Keresztesi | Mexico; Karina Alanis; Maricela Montemayor |
| 2019 | Canada; Andréanne Langlois; Alanna Bray-Lougheed | Argentina; Brenda Rojas; Maria Garro | Mexico; Beatriz Briones; Karina Alanís |
| 2023 | Mexico; Beatriz Briones; Karina Alanis | Argentina; Brenda Rojas; Maria Garro | Canada; Courtney Stott; Madeline Schmidt |

=== K-4 500 metres ===
| Games | Gold | Silver | Bronze |
|---|---|---|---|
| 1987 | United States | Canada | Cuba |
| 1991 | Cuba | Canada | United States |
| 1995 | Canada; Canada | United States of America; United States | Cuba; Cuba |
| 1999 | Canada; Canada | Cuba; Cuba | United States of America; United States |
| 2003 | Canada; Jennifer Adamson; Jillian D'Alessio; Émilie Fournel; Victoria Tuttle | United States; Kathryn Colin; Sonrisa Reed; Ruth Nortje; Kari-Jean McKenzie | Argentina; Mari Ducrett; Vanesia Pittao; Sabrina Ameghino; María Romano |
| 2007 | Cuba; Darisleydis Amador; Yulitza Meneses; Lianet Álvarez; Dayexi Gandarela | Venezuela; Eliana Escalona; Vanessa Silva; Ladymar Hernández; Zulmarys Sánchez | Canada; Jillian D'Alessio; Kia Byers; Camille Tessier-Bussières; Marie-Christine Schmidt |
| 2011 | Canada; Kathleen Fraser; Kristin Ann Gauthier; Alexa Irvin; Una Lounder | Mexico; Anais Abraham; Karina Alanis; Alicia Guluarte; Maricela Montemayor | Cuba; Darisleydis Amador; Yulitza Meneses; Dayexi Gandarela; Yusmari Mengana |
| 2015 | Canada; Émilie Fournel; Kathleen Fraser; Michelle Russell; Hannah Vaughan | Cuba; Daniela Martin; Yurieni Guerra; Lisandra Torres; Jessica Hernandez | Argentina; Maria Magdalena Garro; Sabrina Ameghino; Alexandra Keresztesi; Brenda Rojas |
| 2019 | Canada; Andréanne Langlois; Alexa Irvin; Alanna Bray-Lougheed; Anna Negulic | Mexico; Beatriz Briones; Karina Alanís; Brenda Gutiérrez; Maricela Montemayor | Argentina; Maria Garro; Micaela Maslein; Brenda Rojas; Sabrina Ameghino |
| 2023 | Mexico; Karina Alanis; Brenda Gutiérrez; Beatriz Briones; Maricela Montemayor | Canada; Courtney Stott; Natalie Davison; Riley Melanson; Toshka Besharah-Hrebacka | Argentina; Candelaria Sequeira; Lucia Dalto; Martina Isequilla; Sabrina Ameghino |

=== C-1 Slalom ===
| Games | Gold | Silver | Bronze |
|---|---|---|---|
| 2015 | Ana Sátila; Brazil | Colleen Hickey; United States | Haley Daniels; Canada |
| 2019 | Ana Sátila; Brazil | Lois Betteridge; Canada | Michaela Corcoran; United States |
| 2023 | Ana Sátila; Brazil | Lois Betteridge; Canada | Ana Paula Fernandes; Paraguay |

=== K-1 Slalom ===
| Games | Gold | Silver | Bronze |
|---|---|---|---|
| 2015 | Jazmyne Denhollander; Canada | Ana Sátila; Brazil | Ashley Nee; United States |
| 2019 | Evy Leibfarth; United States | Nadia Riquelme; Argentina | Sofía Reinoso; Mexico |
| 2023 | Evy Leibfarth; United States | Omira Estácia Neta; Brazil | Léa Baldoni; Canada |

=== K-1 Extreme Slalom ===
| Games | Gold | Silver | Bronze |
|---|---|---|---|
| 2019 | Ana Sátila; Brazil | Evy Leibfarth; United States | Sofía Reinoso; Mexico |

=== K-1 Kayak Cross ===
| Games | Gold | Silver | Bronze |
|---|---|---|---|
| 2023 | Ana Sátila; Brazil | Lois Betteridge; Canada | Evy Leibfarth; United States |
