= Canoeing at the 1987 Pan American Games =

The 1987 Pan American Games was the first to hold canoeing events.

== Medal table ==
Place	Nation	Gold medal	Silver medal	Bronze medal	Total
1	United States	10	1	1	12
2	Cuba	1	6	3	10
3	Canada	1	5	4	10
4	Argentina	0	0	4	4
Total		12	12	12	36

== Men's events ==
Event	Gold	Silver	Bronze
C-1 500 metres	Jim Terrell; United States	Stephen Wasteneys; Canada	Jorge Montero; Cuba
C-2 500 metres	Cuba; Juan Aballi; Jorge Montero	Canada; Jack Chubaty; Max Tracy	United States; Rod McLain; Bruce Merritt
C-1 1000 metres	Bruce Merritt; United States	Armando Silega; Cuba	Stephen Wasteneys; Canada
C-2 1000 metres	Canada; Jack Chubaty; Max Tracy	United States; Rod McLain; Jim Terrell	Cuba; Juan Aballi; Jorge Delgado
K-1 500 metres	Norman Bellingham; United States	Luis Pérez; Cuba	Jeff Houser; Canada
K-2 500 metres	United States; Mike Herbert; Terry Kent	Cuba; Marlo Marcheco; Jorge Méndez	Canada; Tom Ladanyi; Eric Myles
K-1 1000 metres	Greg Barton; United States	Jorge García; Cuba	Atilio Vásquez; Argentina
K-2 1000 metres	United States; Greg Barton; Norman Bellingham	Cuba; Marlo Marcheco; Jorge Méndez	Canada; Jeff Houser; Liam Jewell
K-4 1000 metres	United States; Curt Bader; Michael Harbold; Terry White; Mike Herbert	Cuba; Luís Fernández; Marlo Marcheco; Jorge García; Jorge Méndez	Argentina; José Luis Marello; Gustavo Cirillo; Juan Labrin; Fernando Chaparro

== Women's events ==
Event	Gold	Silver	Bronze
K-1 500 metres	Traci Phillips; United States	Erika Revesz; Canada	Verónica Arbo; Argentina
K-2 500 metres	United States; Shirley Dery-Batlik; Sheila Conover	Canada; Louise Hine; Cindy Leonard	Argentina; Corina Martín; María Miliauro
K-4 500 metres	United States; Sheila Conover; Shirley Dery-Batlik; Traci Phillips; Jojo Toeppner	Canada; Louise Hine; Erika Revesz; Cindy Leonard; Alexandra Rubinger	Cuba; Paula Grisel Rivas; Elisa Zaldívar; Vilma Lao; Belkis Martínez
