= Canoeing at the 1987 Pan American Games – Men's K-2 500 metres =

Men's K-2 500 metres at the 1987 Pan American Games
- Venue: Eagle Creek Park
- Dates: 9 August
- Competitors: 14 from 7 nations
- Winning time: 1.38.97

Medalists
Gold medal	Mike Herbert; Terry Kent	United States
Silver medal	Marlo Marcheco; Jorge Méndez	Cuba
Bronze medal	Tom Ladanyi; Eric Myles	Canada

The men's K-2 500 metres canoeing event at the 1987 Pan American Games was held at the Eagle Creek Park in Indianapolis.

== Results ==
=== Final ===
Rank	Athletes	Country	Time	Notes
1st place, gold medalist(s)	Mike Herbert; Terry Kent	United States	1.38.97	
2nd place, silver medalist(s)	Marlo Marcheco; Jorge Méndez	Cuba	1.42.74	
3rd place, bronze medalist(s)	Tom Ladanyi; Eric Myles	Canada	1.44.61	
4	José Luis Marello; Gustavo Cirillo	Argentina	1.45.84	
5	Juan Ortiz; Felipe Romero	Mexico	1.52.30	
6	Jesús Spagnolo; Victor Ayzaguer	Uruguay	1.56.45	
7	Serge Baker; Alejo Pacheco	Costa Rica	2.14.45	
