= Mexico at the 2007 Pan American Games =

- IOC code: MEX
- NOC: Comité Olímpico Mexicano (in Spanish)

in Rio de Janeiro 13–29 July 2007
- Competitors: 400
- Flag bearer: Iridia Salazar
- Medals: Gold 18 Silver 24 Bronze 31 Total 73

Pan American Games appearances (overview)
- 1951; 1955; 1959; 1963; 1967; 1971; 1975; 1979; 1983; 1987; 1991; 1995; 1999; 2003; 2007; 2011; 2015; 2019; 2023; 2027

The 15th Pan American Games were held in Rio de Janeiro, Brazil from 13 to 29 July 2007. Mexico participated with 400 athletes and 218 staff members (delegates, officials, medical and auxiliary staff).

== Goals ==
Mexican athletes achieved the Mexican Olympic Committee goal for the National representation as they ended up placed at the 5th place in general medal count, same place obtained at the 14th Pan American Games.

== Medals ==
=== Gold ===
==== Athletics ====
(gold) María Romary Rifka – Women's high jump
(gold) Ana Gabriela Guevara Espinoza – Women's 400m
(gold) José David Galván – Men's 10000m

==== Boxing ====
(gold) Carlos Cuadras Quiroa – Men's bantamweight 54 kg

==== Canoeing ====
(gold) (gold) José Cristóbal Quirino – Men's C1 1000m and 500 categories.
(gold) (gold) Manuel Cortina and Jesús Valdez – Men's K2 1000m and 500m categories.
(gold) Manuel Cortina – Men's K1 500m

==== Diving ====
(gold) (gold) Paola Espinosa – Women's 10m platform and 3m springboard categories.
(gold) Paola Espinosa and Laura Sánchez – Women's 3m synch springboard

==== Judo ====
(gold) Vanessa Zambotti – Women's over 78 kg

==== Squash ====
(gold) Erick Gálvez – Men's individual.

==== Taekwondo ====
(gold) Alejandra Gaal – Women's up to 49 kg
(gold) Iridia Salazar – Women's from 49 to 57 kg
(gold) María del Rosario Espinoza – Women's above 67 kg

==== Weightlifting ====
(gold) Carolina Valencia – Women's up to 48 kg category (First Gold medal for Mexico at the 2007 Pan American Games).

=== Silver ===
==== Athletics ====
(silver) Dulce María Rodríguez de la Cruz – Women's 10,000m
(silver) (silver) Juan Luis Barrios – Men's 5000m and 1500m categories.
(silver) Horacio Nava – Men's 50 km walk
(silver) Giovanni Lanaro – Men's pole vault
(silver) Talis Apud – Women's 3000m steeplechase
(silver) Ana Gabriela Guevara Espinoza, Gabriela E. Medina, Zudykey Rodríguez and María Teresa Rugeiro – Women's 4x400m relay

==== Archery ====
(silver) Aida Román – Women's individual.

==== Canoeing ====
(silver) José Cristóbal Quirino and Gilberto Soriano – Men's C2 500m

==== Cycling ====
(silver) Alexandra Giuseppina Grassi – Women's individual pursuit
(silver) Belem Guerrero Méndez – Women's road race

==== Diving ====
(silver) Paola Espinosa and Tatiana Ortiz Galicia – Women's 10m synch platform
(silver) Laura Sánchez – Women's 3m springboard
(silver) Rommel Pacheco – Men's 10m platform

==== Rhythmic gymnastics ====
(silver) Cynthia Yazmin Valdez Pérez – Women's individual all-around
(silver) Ruth Castillo Galindo – Women's individual apparatus, hoop

==== Karate ====
(silver) Bertha Gutiérrez – Women's under 60 kg

==== Rowing ====
(silver) Analicia Ramírez and Lila Pérez – Women's lightweight double sculls

==== Sailing ====
(silver) Tania Elías Calles Wolf – Women's one person dinghy, laser radial

==== Swimming ====
(silver) (silver) Patricia Midori Castañeda Miyamoto – Women's 400m and 800m freestyle categories.

==== Weightlifting ====
(silver) Cinthya Domínguez – Women's up to 69 kg
(silver) Damaris Aguirre – Women's up to 75 kg

=== Bronze ===
==== Archery ====
Jorge Chapoy, Juan René Serrano and Eduardo Vélez – Men's team

==== Athletics ====
María Esther Sánchez – Women's 20 km walk
Alejandro Suárez – Men's 10000m
Nora Leticia Rocha – Women's 5000m
Omar Cepeda de León – Men's 50 km walk
Procopio Franco – Men's marathon.

==== Baseball ====
(bronze) Mexican and Nicaraguan men's national teams, Bronze medal in Baseball, the game was cancelled due to rain, and the Organizing Committee decided to award the medal to both teams.

==== Beach Volleyball ====
(bronze) Bibiana Candelas and Mayra García – Women's beach volleyball.

==== Boxing ====
(bronze) Braulio Ávila Juárez – Men's fly 51 kg

==== Bowling ====
(bronze) Sandra Góngora and Adriana Pérez – Women's doubles.

==== Canoeing ====
(bronze) Anca Ionela Mateescu – Women's K1 500m

==== Cycling ====
(bronze) Laura Lorenza Morfin Macouzet – Women's mountain bike
(bronze) Belem Guerrero Méndez – women's points race

==== Football ====
(bronze) Mexico men's national team.

==== Rhythmic gymnastics ====
(bronze) Ruth Castillo Galindo – Women's individual all-around
(bronze) (bronze) (bronze) Cynthia Yasmín Valdez Pérez – Women's individual apparatus, rope, clubs and ribbon categories.
(bronze) Blajaith Aguilar Rojas, Sofía Díaz de León Lastras, Marienne Montserrat Martínez Medina, Ana Cristina Ortega Benítez, Citlaly Quinta Álvarez and Sara Elizabeth Reyes Rodríguez – Women's all-around

==== Sailing ====
(bronze) David Mier y Terán – Men's Windsurfer, Neil Pryde RS:X
(bronze) Andrés Akle Carranza and Jorge Xavier Murrieta – Men's double-handed dinghy, snipe

==== Shooting ====
(bronze) José Roberto Elías Orozco – Men's 10m air rifle
(bronze) Alix Moncada – Women's 10m air rifle
(bronze) Ariel Mauricio Flores Gómez – Men's skeet

==== Squash ====
(bronze) Samantha Terán – Women's Squash.
(bronze) Samantha Terán, Karina Herrera Zúñiga and Nayelly Hernández – Women's team
(bronze) Erick Gálvez, Jorge Baltazar and Marcos Méndez – Men's team

==== Swimming ====
(bronze) Juan Veloz – Men's 200m butterfly

==== Taekwondo ====
(bronze) José Luis Ramírez – Men's from 68 to 80 kg

==== Tennis ====
(bronze) Santiago González and Víctor Romero – Men's team

==== Wrestling ====
(bronze) Oscar Aguilar – Men's Greco-Roman 96 kg

== Revoked medals ==
=== Artistic gymnastics ===
(bronze) The Pan American Games Organizing Committee decided to revoke the Bronze medal obtained by the Mexican Women's gymnastics team (Marisela Arizmendi Torres, Maricela Cantú Mata, Yesenia Estrada Martínez, Érika Mariene García Aguiñaga, Elsa García Rodríguez Blancas and Yeny Ibarra Valdez); Marisela Arizmendi Torres had an accreditation as an official ("As" accreditation) instead of being registered as an athlete ("Ao" accreditation), therefore the PASO Executive Committee decided to revoke the bronze medal and award it to the Canadian Women's team, who came up as 4th during the competition.

== Results by event ==
=== Basketball ===
==== Women's team competition ====
- Team Roster

- Jennifer Arriola
- Veronica Carmona
- Alejandra Delgado
- Abril Selene García
- Erika Gomez
- Fernanda Gutierrez
- Lourdes Machuca
- Taine Ramírez
- Sandra Ramos
- Zazil Salman
- Brisa Silva
- Melendez Villavicencio

=== Triathlon ===
==== Men's Competition ====
- Arturo Garza

- 1:53:43.51 – 9th place

- Leonardo Saucedo

- 1:56:26.50 – 18th place

- Javier Rosas Sierra

- 1:56:49.99 – 19th place

==== Women's Competition ====
- Melody Angel Ramírez

- 2:00:44.24 – 5th place

- Adriana Corona

- 2:01:00.46 – 7th place

- Dunia Gómez Tirado

- 2:04:20.30 – 15th place

== See also ==
- Mexico at the 2008 Summer Olympics
- Events at the 2007 Pan American Games
