= Canoeing at the 1987 Pan American Games – Men's K-4 1000 metres =

Men's K-4 1000 metres at the 1987 Pan American Games
- Venue: Eagle Creek Park
- Dates: 9 August
- Competitors: 20 from 5 nations
- Winning time: 3.02.90

Medalists
Gold medal	Curt Bader; Michael Harbold; Terry White; Mike Herbert	United States
Silver medal	Luís Fernández; Marlo Marcheco; Jorge García; Jorge Méndez	Cuba
Bronze medal	José Luis Marello; Gustavo Cirillo; Juan Labrin; Fernando Chaparro	Argentina

The men's K-4 1000 metres canoeing event at the 1987 Pan American Games was held at the Eagle Creek Park in Indianapolis.

== Results ==
=== Final ===
Rank	Athletes	Country	Time	Notes
1st place, gold medalist(s)	Curt Bader; Michael Harbold; Terry White; Mike Herbert	United States	3.02.90	
2nd place, silver medalist(s)	Luís Fernández; Marlo Marcheco; Jorge García; Jorge Méndez	Cuba	3.08.65	
3rd place, bronze medalist(s)	José Luis Marello; Gustavo Cirillo; Juan Labrin; Fernando Chaparro	Argentina	3.12.51	
4	Tom Ladanyi; Liam Jewell; Jeff Houser; Eric Myles	Canada	3.17.48	
5	Serge Baker; Peter Ossenbach; Alejo Pacheco; Thomas Ossenbach	Costa Rica	4.09.99	
