= Brookfield High School (Ottawa) =

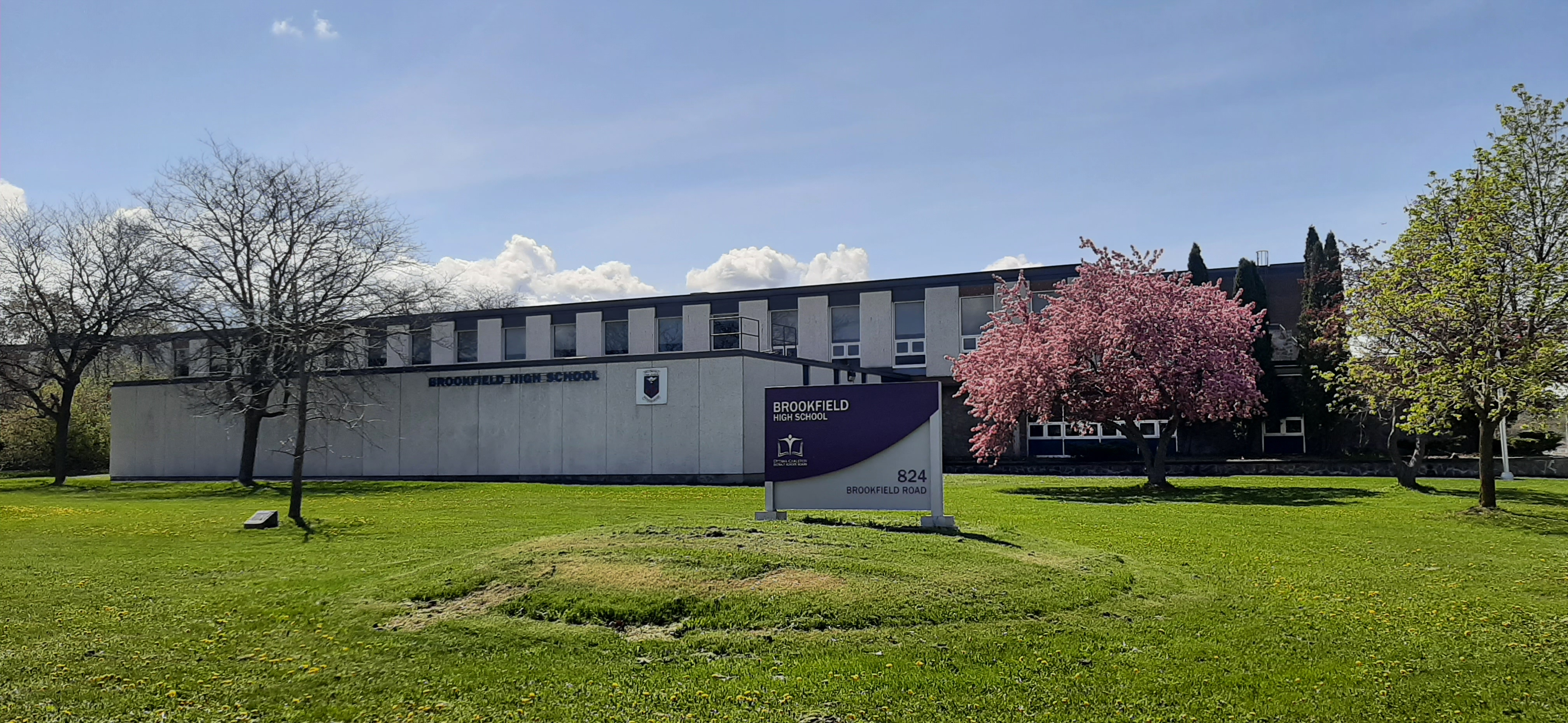

Location
- 824 Brookfield Road; Ottawa, Ontario, K1V 6J3; Canada; 45°22′20″N 75°41′05″W

Information
- Motto: Progrediamur (May We Move Forward Together)
- Founded: 1962
- School board: Ottawa Carleton District School Board
- Superintendent: Reg Lavergne
- Area trustee: Matthew Lee
- Principal: Ashley Shaw
- Grades: 9-12
- Enrollment: ▲558 (2023)
- Capacity: 1218
- Language: English, French
- Campus type: Suburban
- Colours: Blue, White and Red
- Mascot: Blue the French Bulldog
- Team name: Blues
- Website: brookfieldhs.ocdsb.ca

Brookfield High School is an Ottawa-Carleton District School Board high school in the Riverside Park neighbourhood of Ottawa, Ontario, Canada. It officially opened in 1962. Like most schools in Ottawa, Brookfield is composite and semestered. The school is well known for its successful language classes, athletic teams, music program, and special education department.

== Academics and arts ==
Brookfield High School specializes in a French immersion program as well as ESL classes and is one of the few schools in Ottawa to offer instruction in Arabic and Spanish.

Many specialized courses are offered at Brookfield including design technology, communication technology, food and nutrition, peer tutoring, and cooperative education as well as numerous special education classes. In 2008, Brookfield was recognized by the George Lucas Foundation for their outstanding achievements in the integration of technology across the curriculum.

The school has well-established arts programs offering music, drama, and visual arts classes up to grade 12. Brookfield's concert band, jazz band, and choir have been successful in local and national music competitions including MusicFest Canada and Kiwanis Music Festival. In 2009, the music program received a $10,000 grant from the MusiCounts Band Aid Program. On July 8, 2014, the Brookfield Choir performed "I Want to Know What Love Is" onstage with Foreigner during their performance at Ottawa Bluesfest. The school's drama department has been part of several Cappies productions.

== Athletics ==
Brookfield is home to several successful sports teams, many of which have earned high rankings at municipal and provincial championships. Brookfield has the following varsity sports teams: badminton, baseball, basketball, cross country running, curling, golf, hockey, Nordic skiing, rugby, soccer, tennis, touch football, track & field, ultimate, volleyball, and wrestling.

== Notable alumni ==
- Rick Brant (middle-distance runner)
- Riley Brockington (politician)
- Jim Buchanan (long jumper)
- Randall Dark (director, producer, and HDTV pioneer)
- Bruce Deacon (long-distance runner)
- Jon Dore (comedian, actor)
- Scott Gordon (football player)
- Kristina Groves (speed skater)
- Sue Holloway (Nordic skier and canoeist)
- Claudia Hunt (canoeist)
- Sean Kaley (long-distance runner)
- John Kricfalusi (animator)
- Mike MacDonald (comedian)
- Stuart McGregor (paralympian)
- Bob McKeown (football player, journalist)
- Marc Methot (hockey player)
- Emma Miskew (curler)
- Angus Mortimer (kayaker)
- Ian Mortimer (canoeist)
- Jim Peplinski (hockey player)
- Chris Robinson (writer, author, artistic director of Ottawa International Animation Festival)
- Seyi Smith (sprinter)
- Dan Tudin (hockey player)

== See also ==
- Education in Ontario
- List of schools of the Ottawa-Carleton District School Board
- List of schools in Ottawa
- List of high schools in Ontario
