= Canoeing at the 2023 Pan American Games – Men's K-2 500 metres =

Men's K-2 500 metres at the 2023 Pan American Games
- Venue: Laguna Grande
- Dates: November 1 and November 3
- Competitors: 18 from 9 nations
- Winning time: 1:30.45

Medalists
Gold medal	Ian Gaudet; Simon McTavish	Canada
Silver medal	Gonzalo Benassi; Agustín Vernice	Argentina
Bronze medal	Jonas Ecker; Aaron Small	United States

The men's K-2 500 metres competition of the canoeing events at the 2023 Pan American Games was held on November 1 and 3 at the Laguna Grande in San Pedro de la Paz, Chile.

The men's K-2 event was changed from 1000 metres, as it was contested during the previous games, to 500 metres.

== Schedule ==
Date	Time	Round
November 1, 2023	09:20	Heats
November 1, 2023	11:20	Semifinals
November 3, 2023	09:20	Final

== Results ==
=== Heats ===
The best two score of each heat advance directly to the final, while the rest advance to the semifinal.

==== Heat 1 ====
Rank	Name	Nation	Time	Notes
1	Gonzalo Benassi; Agustín Vernice	Argentina	1:31.59	F
2	Jonas Ecker; Aaron Small	United States	1:33.66	F
3	Robert Benítez; Yan López	Cuba	1:38.84	SF
4	Erick Cabrera; Matías Otero	Uruguay	1:48.79	SF
5	Eddy Barranco; Rodrigo González	Puerto Rico	1:51.49	SF

==== Heat 2 ====
Rank	Name	Nation	Time	Notes
1	Ian Gaudet; Simon McTavish	Canada	1:32.50	F
2	Camilo Valdés; Marcelo Godoy	Chile	1:33.24	F
3	Heuer Silva Rodrigues; Roberto Maehler	Brazil	1:34.87	SF
4	Juan Rodríguez; Alberto Briones	Mexico	1:35.76	SF

=== Semifinals ===
The best four scores advance to the final.

Rank	Name	Nation	Time	Notes
1	Robert Benítez; Yan López	Cuba	1:36.73	F
2	Juan Rodríguez; Alberto Briones	Mexico	1:38.66	F
3	Heuer Silva Rodrigues; Roberto Maehler	Brazil	1:40.10	F
4	Erick Cabrera; Matías Otero	Uruguay	1:44.29	F
5	Eddy Barranco; Rodrigo González	Puerto Rico	1:50.43	

=== Final ===
The results for the finals were as follows:

Rank	Name	Nation	Time	Notes
1st place, gold medalist(s)	Ian Gaudet; Simon McTavish	Canada	1:30.45	
2nd place, silver medalist(s)	Gonzalo Benassi; Agustín Vernice	Argentina	1:31.25	
3rd place, bronze medalist(s)	Jonas Ecker; Aaron Small	United States	1:31.48	
4	Erick Cabrera; Matías Otero	Uruguay	1:32.85	
5	Camilo Valdés; Marcelo Godoy	Chile	1:34.54	
6	Heuer Silva Rodrigues; Roberto Maehler	Brazil	1:34.79	
7	Juan Rodríguez; Alberto Briones	Mexico	1:35.71	
8	Robert Benítez; Yan López	Cuba	1:36.94	
