= Canoeing at the 1987 Pan American Games – Men's K-2 1000 metres =

Men's K-2 1000 metres at the 1987 Pan American Games
- Venue: Eagle Creek Park
- Dates: 9 August
- Competitors: 14 from 7 nations
- Winning time: 3.22.30

Medalists
Gold medal	Greg Barton; Norman Bellingham	United States
Silver medal	Marlo Marcheco; Jorge Méndez	Cuba
Bronze medal	Jeff Houser; Liam Jewell	Canada

The men's K-2 1000 metres canoeing event at the 1987 Pan American Games was held at the Eagle Creek Park in Indianapolis.

== Results ==
=== Final ===
Rank	Athletes	Country	Time	Notes
1st place, gold medalist(s)	Greg Barton; Norman Bellingham	United States	3.22.30	
2nd place, silver medalist(s)	Marlo Marcheco; Jorge Méndez	Cuba	3.33.95	
3rd place, bronze medalist(s)	Jeff Houser; Liam Jewell	Canada	3.35.38	
4	Atilio Vásquez; Juan Labrin	Argentina	3.35.94	
5	Juan Ortiz; Felipe Romero	Mexico	3.54.45	
6	Jesús Spagnolo; Victor Ayzaguer	Uruguay	4.03.24	
7	Fernando Castañeda; Juan Castañeda	Costa Rica	4.42.85	
