= List of canoe/kayak athletes by country =

== Australia ==
Kayak

- Nathan Baggaley, two Olympic silver medal
- Grant Kenny
- Clint Robinson, three-time Olympic medalist
- Anna Wood, Women's World K2 500 and K2 1000 Champion 1998, Olympic bronze 1996
- Ken Wallace, 2008 Beijing & 2016 Rio Olympics – Bronze K1 1000, Bronze K2 1000 and Gold K1 500

Paracanoe

- Curtis McGrath (kayaker & va'a canoe), four Paralympic gold medals - 2016, 2020, 2024

== Belarus ==
Kayak

- Aliaksei Abalmasau
- Volha Khudzenka
- Vadzim Makhneu
- Iryna Pamialova
- Nadzeya Papok
- Raman Piatrushenka
- Maryna Pautaran
- Dziamyan Turchyn

== Bulgaria ==
Canoe

- Nikolay Bukhalov
- Ivan Burtchin
- Fedia Damianov
- Lyubomir Lyubenov

Kayak

- Vanja Gesheva-Tsvetkova
- Borislava Ivanova
- Milko Kazanov
- Petar Merkov
- Diana Paliiska
- Ognyana Petrova

== Canada ==
Canoe

- Attila Buday
- Tamas Buday Jr.
- Larry Cain, two Olympic medals
- Richard Dalton, participant in 2004 Summer Olympics
- Steve Giles, bronze medalist in 2000 Summer Olympics
- Ian Mortimer
- Michael Scarola
- Gavin Maxwell, participant in 1996 Summer Olympics

Kayak

- Mylanie Barre
- Caroline Brunet, two silver and one bronze Olympic medals
- Jillian D'Alessio
- Karen Furneaux
- Kamini Jain
- Carrie Lightbound
- Angus Mortimer, participant in 2008 Summer Olympics
- Adam van Koeverden, Olympic champion in K-1 500m sprint in the 2004 Summer Olympics

== China ==
Canoe

- Meng Guanliang
- Yang Wenjun

Kayak

- Wang Lei

== Croatia ==
Canoe

- Emanuel Horvatiček
- Matija Ljubek

== Cuba ==
Canoe

- Ibrahim Rojas Blanco
- Ledis Frank Balceiro Pajon

== Czech Republic ==
Canoe

- Martin Doktor, two Olympic gold medals

== Denmark ==
Canoe

- Henning Lynge Jakobsen
- Christian Frederiksen
- Ivan Burtchin
- Peer Nielsen
- John Sørensen

Kayak

- Karen Hoff
- Tove Søby

== France ==
Kayak

- Babak Amir Tahmasseb
- Philippe Colin
- Cyrille Carré

== Germany ==
Canoe

- Andreas Dittmer, three gold, one silver and one bronze Olympic medals
- Christian Gille
- Tomasz Wylenzek
- Robert Nuck
- Stefan Holtz
- Stephan Breuing
- Thomas Lück

Kayak

- Katrin Wagner-Augustin, four gold and one bronze Olympic medals
- Björn Bach
- Birgit Fischer
- Andreas Ihle
- Ronald Rauhe
- Stefan Ulm
- Tim Wieskötter
- Mark Zabel

== Great Britain ==
Kayak

- Tim Brabants
- Ed McKeever
- Ian Wynne

== Hungary ==
Canoe

- György Kolonics, two gold and two bronze Olympic Medals
- György Kozmann
- Attila Vajda, one Olympic bronze

Kayak

- István Beé
- Zoltán Benkő
- Kinga Bóta
- Natasa Janics
- Zoltán Kammerer
- Rita Kőbán
- Roland Kökény
- Katalin Kovács
- Danuta Kozák
- Gábor Horváth
- Botond Storcz
- Szilvia Szabó
- Ákos Vereckei
- Erzsébet Viski

== Israel ==
Kayak

- Michael Kolganov

== Italy ==
Kayak

- Beniamino Bonomi
- Andrea Facchin
- Josepha Idem
- Antonio Rossi
- Daniele Scarpa

== Latvia ==
Canoe

- Ivans Klementjevs

== Lithuania ==
Canoe

- Jevgenij Shuklin
- Raimundas Labuckas

Kayak

- Egidijus Balčiūnas
- Alvydas Duonėla

== Mexico ==
Canoe

- Everardo Cristóbal
- Antonio Romero
- Ramón Ferrer
- Benjamín Castaneda

== Netherlands ==
Kayak

- Annemiek Derckx
- Mieke Jaapies
- Alida van der Anker-Doedens

== New Zealand ==
Kayak

- Lisa Carrington
- Ian Ferguson
- Steven Ferguson
- Cory Hutchings
- Ben Fouhy

== Norway ==
Kayak

- Nils Olav Fjeldheim
- Eirik Verås Larsen
- Knut Holmann

== Poland ==
Canoe

- Paweł Baraszkiewicz
- Marek Dopierała
- Daniel Jędraszko
- Marek Łbik
- Michał Śliwiński

Kayak

- Izabela Dylewska
- Maciej Freimut
- Grzegorz Kotowicz
- Tomasz Mendelski
- Wojciech Kurpiewski
- Aneta Pastuszka
- Karolina Sadalska
- Adam Seroczyński
- Beata Sokołowska-Kulesza
- Marek Twardowski
- Marek Witkowski
- Adam Wysocki

== Portugal ==
- Fernando Pimenta
- Emanuel Silva

== Romania ==
Canoe

- Ionel Averian
- Antonel Borșan
- Serghei Covaliov
- Gheorghe Danielov
- Florin Georgian Mironcic, current European champion in C-1 1000m
- Marcel Glăvan
- Ivan Patzaichin, most canoe medals in the history of the Summer Olympics
- Florin Popescu
- Leon Rotman
- Silviu Simioncencu
- Gheorghe Simionov

Kayak

- Agafia Constantin
- Viorica Dumitru
- Nastasia Ionescu
- Hilde Lauer
- Tecla Marinescu
- Maria Nichiforov
- Cornelia Sideri
- Maria Ştefan

== Russia ==
Canoe

- Maksim Opalev, bronze and silver Olympic medals
- Alexander Kostoglod
- Ivan Shtyl
- Aleksandr Kovalyov

Kayak

- Alexander Dyachenko
- Yury Postrigay
- Anatoly Tishchenko

== Serbia ==
Canoe

- Mirko Nišović

Kayak

- Milan Đenadić
- Ognjen Filipovic
- Milan Janić
- Nikolina Moldovan
- Olivera Moldovan
- Antonija Nađ
- Marko Novaković
- Dalma Ružičić-Benedek
- Bora Sibinkić
- Dragan Zoric

== Slovakia ==
Kayak

- Juraj Bača
- Róbert Erban
- Michal Riszdorfer
- Richard Riszdorfer
- Erik Vlček

== Slovenia ==
Kayak

- Špela Ponomarenko Janić

== South Africa ==
- Hank McGregor
- Bridgitte Hartley

== Spain ==
Canoe

- David Cal, gold and silver medallist at the 2004 Summer Olympics

Kayak

- Saúl Craviotto
- Carlos Pérez

== Sweden ==
Kayak

- Henrik Nilsson
- Markus Oscarsson
- Gert Fredriksson
- Susanne Gunnarsson

See more Swedish canoers in Category:Swedish canoeists

== Switzerland ==
Kayak

- Daniela Baumer
- Sabine Eichenberger
- Ingrid Haralamow
- Gabi Müller

== Ukraine ==
Canoe

- Yuriy Cheban
- Maksym Prokopenko

Kayak

- Olena Cherevatova
- Hanna Balabanova
- Inna Osypenko-Radomska
- Tetyana Semykina

== United States ==
Canoe

- Jordan Malloch
- Nathan Johnson

== See also ==
- Canoeing at the Olympics
