= Hemmens =

Hemmens is a surname. Notable people with the surname include:

- DeAnne Hemmens (born 1964), American sprint canoeist
- Heather Hemmens (born 1988), American actress, director, and producer

== See also ==
- Hemmen
