= Canoeing at the 1987 Pan American Games – Men's C-1 500 metres =

Men's C-1 500 metres at the 1987 Pan American Games
- Venue: Eagle Creek Park
- Dates: 9 August
- Competitors: 5 from 5 nations
- Winning time: 2.06.25

Medalists
Gold medal	Jim Terrell	United States
Silver medal	Stephen Wasteneys	Canada
Bronze medal	Jorge Montero	Cuba

The men's C-1 500 metres canoeing event at the 1987 Pan American Games was held at the Eagle Creek Park in Indianapolis.

== Results ==
=== Final ===
Rank	Athletes	Country	Time	Notes
1st place, gold medalist(s)	Jim Terrell	United States	2.06.25	
2nd place, silver medalist(s)	Stephen Wasteneys	Canada	2.07.94	
3rd place, bronze medalist(s)	Jorge Montero	Cuba	2.12.47	
4	José Altamirano	Mexico	2.12.61	
5	Leopoldo Sanzi	Argentina	2.21.64	
