= Canoeing at the 2010 South American Games – Women's K-2 500 metres =

The Women's K-2 500m event at the 2010 South American Games was held March 28, 2010 at 10:00.

== Medalists ==
| Gold | Silver | Bronze |
|---|---|---|
| Aura María Ospina; Tatiana Muñoz; Colombia | Juliana Domingos; Naiane Pereira; Brazil | Maria Cecilia Collueque; Maria Fernanda Lauro; Argentina |

== Results ==
| Rank | Athlete | Time |
|---|---|---|
| 1st place, gold medalist(s) | Colombia; Aura María Ospina; Tatiana Muñoz | 1:48.60 |
| 2nd place, silver medalist(s) | Brazil; Juliana Domingos; Naiane Pereira | 1:49.13 |
| 3rd place, bronze medalist(s) | Argentina; Maria Cecilia Collueque; Maria Fernanda Lauro | 1:49.84 |
| 4 | Chile; Barbara Alejandra Gomez; Fabiola Alejandra Pavez | 1:50.91 |
| 5 | Venezuela; Eliana Escalona; Vanessa Yorsel Silva | 1:53.83 |
