= Canoeing at the 2010 South American Games – Women's K-4 500 metres =

The Women's K-4 500m event at the 2010 South American Games was held over March 28 at 11:00.

== Medalists ==
Gold	Silver	Bronze
Juliana Domingos; Bruna Gama; Naiane Pereira; Ariela Pinto; Brazil	Barbara Alejandra Gomez; Ysumy Omayra Trigo; Yanara Alejandra Santander; Fabiola Alejandra Pavez; Chile	Eliana Escalona; Yuleidis Coromoto Ramos; Andreina Silva; Vanessa Yorsel Silva; Venezuela

== Results ==
Rank	Athlete	Time
1st place, gold medalist(s)	Brazil; Juliana Domingos; Bruna Gama; Naiane Pereira; Ariela Pinto	1:49.94
2nd place, silver medalist(s)	Chile; Barbara Alejandra Gomez; Ysumy Omayra Trigo; Yanara Alejandra Santander; Fabiola Alejandra Pavez	1:50.34
3rd place, bronze medalist(s)	Venezuela; Eliana Escalona; Yuleidis Coromoto Ramos; Andreina Silva; Vanessa Yorsel Silva	1:51.55
4	Argentina; Maria Cecilia Collueque; Natalin Fontanini; Maria Magdalena Garro; Antonela Santos	1:52.69
5	Colombia; Aura María Ospina; Tatiana Muñoz; Ruth Niño; María Santacruz	1:54.67
