= Canoeing at the 2010 South American Games – Women's K-1 500 metres =

Event at the 2010 South American Games

The Women's K-1 500m event at the 2010 South American Games was held over March 28 at 9:00.

== Medalists ==
Gold	Silver	Bronze
Maria Fernanda Lauro; Argentina	Tatiana Muñoz; Colombia	Naiane Pereira; Brazil

== Results ==
Rank	Athlete	Time
1st place, gold medalist(s)	Maria Fernanda Lauro (ARG)	1:56.66
2nd place, silver medalist(s)	Tatiana Muñoz (COL)	1:58.33
3rd place, bronze medalist(s)	Naiane Pereira (BRA)	2:00.64
4	Eliana Escalona (VEN)	2:01.25
5	Stefanie Marilin Vinces (ECU)	2:05.03
6	Yanara Santander (CHI)	2:15.42
