= Bordeleau =

Bordeleau is a French-language surname.

People with the surname include:

- Alain Bordeleau (born 1956), Canadian long-distance runner
- Bruno Bordeleau (1868–1929), Canadian politician
- Charles Bordeleau, Canadian police chief
- Christian Bordeleau (born 1947), Canadian hockey player
- J. P. Bordeleau (born 1949), Canadian hockey player
- Jeremy Bordeleau (born 1987), Canadian canoeist
- Patrick Bordeleau (born 1986), Canadian hockey player
- Paulin Bordeleau (born 1953), Canadian-born French hockey player
- Sébastien Bordeleau (born 1975), Canadian-born French hockey player
- Thomas Bordeleau (born 2002) American ice hockey player
- Yvan Bordeleau (born 1942), Canadian politician
