= Canoeing at the 2010 South American Games – Women's K-1 200 metres =

Event at the 2010 South American Games

The Women's K-1 200m event at the 2010 South American Games was held over March 29 at 9:00.

== Medalists ==
Gold	Silver	Bronze
Maria Fernanda Lauro; Argentina	Tatiana Muñoz; Colombia	Eliana Escalona; Venezuela

== Results ==
Rank	Athlete	Time
1st place, gold medalist(s)	Maria Fernanda Lauro (ARG)	45.57
2nd place, silver medalist(s)	Tatiana Muñoz (COL)	46.94
3rd place, bronze medalist(s)	Eliana Escalona (VEN)	47.88
4	Naiane Pereira (BRA)	48.04
5	Stefanie Marilin Vinces (ECU)	51.57
6	Yanara Santander (CHI)	57.63
