= Canoeing at the 2010 South American Games – Women's K-4 1000 metres =

The Women's K-4 1000m event at the 2010 South American Games was held over March 27 at 11:00.

== Medalists ==
Gold	Silver	Bronze
Juliana Domingos; Bruna Gama; Naiane Pereira; Ariela Pinto; Brazil	Aura María Ospina; Tatiana Muñoz; Ruth Niño; María Santacruz; Colombia	Barbara Alejandra Gomez; Ysumy Omayra Trigo; Yanara Alejandra Santander; Fabiola Alejandra Pavez; Chile

== Results ==
Rank	Athlete	Time
1st place, gold medalist(s)	Brazil; Juliana Domingos; Bruna Gama; Naiane Pereira; Ariela Pinto	3:33.70
2nd place, silver medalist(s)	Colombia; Aura María Ospina; Tatiana Muñoz; Ruth Niño; María Santacruz	3:34.03
3rd place, bronze medalist(s)	Chile; Barbara Alejandra Gomez; Ysumy Omayra Trigo; Yanara Alejandra Santander; Fabiola Alejandra Pavez	3:36.99
4	Argentina; Maria Cecilia Collueque; Natalin Fontanini; Maria Magdalena Garro; Antonela Santos	3:38.20
5	Venezuela; Eliana Escalona; Yuleidis Coromoto Ramos; Andreina Silva; Vanessa Yorsel Silva	3:38.65
