= Canoeing at the 2023 Pan American Games – Men's K-1 1000 metres =

Men's K-1 1000 metres at the 2023 Pan American Games
- Venue: Laguna Grande
- Dates: November 2 and November 4
- Competitors: 15 from 14 nations
- Winning time: 3:29.73

Medalists
| Gold medal | Agustín Vernice | Argentina |
| Silver medal | Jonas Ecker | United States |
| Bronze medal | Valentín Rossi | Argentina |

The men's K-1 1000 metres competition of the canoeing events at the 2023 Pan American Games was held on November 2 and 4 at the Laguna Grande in San Pedro de la Paz, Chile.

== Schedule ==
| Date | Time | Round |
|---|---|---|
| November 2, 2023 | 09:00 | Heats |
| November 2, 2023 | 11:00 | Semifinals |
| November 4, 2023 | 09:00 | Final |

== Results ==
=== Heats ===
The best two score of each heat advance directly to the final, while the rest advance to the semifinals.

==== Heat 1 ====
| Rank | Name | Nation | Time | Notes |
|---|---|---|---|---|
| 1 | Agustín Vernice | Argentina | 3:38.33 | FA |
| 2 | Matías Otero | Uruguay | 3:47.65 | FA |
| 3 | Daniel Ledesma | Mexico | 3:49.68 | SFA |
| 4 | Reyler Patterson | Cuba | 3:58.33 | SFB |
| 5 | Amado Cruz | Belize | 3:58.58 | SFB |
| 6 | Miguel Valencia | Chile | 3:59.23 | SFA |
| 7 | Esteven Hidalgo | Peru | 4:02.67 | SFA |
| 8 | José Miguel Jiménez | Dominican Republic | 4:26.34 | SFB |

==== Heat 2 ====
| Rank | Name | Nation | Time | Notes |
|---|---|---|---|---|
| 1 | Valentín Rossi | Argentina | 3:40.58 | FA |
| 2 | Jonas Ecker | United States | 3:42.45 | FA |
| 3 | Cameron Low | Canada | 3:46.44 | SFB |
| 4 | Roberto Maehler | Brazil | 3:47.17 | SFA |
| 5 | Ray Acuña | Venezuela | 4:08.78 | SFA |
| 6 | Eddy Barranco | Puerto Rico | 4:10.03 | SFB |
| 7 | Nicholas Robinson | Trinidad and Tobago | 4:23.27 | SFB |

=== Semifinals ===
The best four scores advance to the Final A, while the rest advance to the Final B.

==== Semifinal A ====
| Rank | Name | Nation | Time | Notes |
|---|---|---|---|---|
| 1 | Daniel Ledesma | Mexico | 3:50.39 | FA |
| 2 | Roberto Maehler | Brazil | 3:52.49 | FA |
| 3 | Miguel Valencia | Chile | 3:56.18 | FB |
| 4 | Ray Acuña | Venezuela | 3:56.53 | FB |
| 5 | Esteven Hidalgo | Peru | 4:00.75 | FB |

==== Semifinal B ====
| Rank | Name | Nation | Time | Notes |
|---|---|---|---|---|
| 1 | Cameron Low | Canada | 3:47.13 | FA |
| 2 | Reyler Patterson | Cuba | 3:56.50 | FA |
| 3 | Amado Cruz | Belize | 3:56.51 | FB |
| 4 | Eddy Barranco | Puerto Rico | 4:02.78 | FB |
| 5 | Nicholas Robinson | Trinidad and Tobago | 4:19.10 | FB |
| 6 | José Miguel Jiménez | Dominican Republic | 4:19.88 | FB |

=== Finals ===
The results for the finals were as follows:

==== Final B ====
| Rank | Name | Nation | Time | Notes |
|---|---|---|---|---|
| 9 | Amado Cruz | Belize | 3:51.69 | |
| 10 | Miguel Valencia | Chile | 3:51.88 | 10 |
| 11 | Eddy Barranco | Puerto Rico | 3:53.49 | |
| 12 | Esteven Hidalgo | Peru | 3:%4.96 | |
| 13 | Ray Acuña | Venezuela | 3:56.32 | |
| 14 | José Miguel Jiménez | Dominican Republic | 4:14.05 | |
| 15 | Nicholas Robinson | Trinidad and Tobago | 4:15.69 | |

==== Final A ====
| Rank | Name | Nation | Time | Notes |
|---|---|---|---|---|
| 1st place, gold medalist(s) | Agustín Vernice | Argentina | 3:29.73 | |
| 2nd place, silver medalist(s) | Jonas Ecker | United States | 3:34.25 | |
| 3rd place, bronze medalist(s) | Valentín Rossi | Argentina | 3:35.49 | |
| 4 | Matías Otero | Uruguay | 3:40.03 | |
| 5 | Daniel Ledesma | Mexico | 3:41.68 | |
| 6 | Cameron Low | Canada | 3:44.69 | |
| 7 | Roberto Maehler | Brazil | 3:48.46 | |
| 8 | Reyler Patterson | Cuba | 3:56.59 | |
