= Ian Mortimer =

Ian Mortimer may refer to:

- Ian Mortimer (historian) (born 1967), British historian and writer of historical fiction
- Ian Mortimer (canoeist) (born 1983), Canadian sprint canoer
