= Canoeing at the 2010 South American Games – Women's K-2 1000 metres =

The Women's K-2 1000m event at the 2010 South American Games was held over March 27 at 10:00.

== Medalists ==
Gold	Silver	Bronze
Barbara Alejandra Gomez; Fabiola Alejandra Pavez; Chile	Aura María Ospina; Tatiana Muñoz; Colombia	Juliana Domingos; Naiane Pereira; Brazil

== Results ==
Rank	Athlete	Time
1st place, gold medalist(s)	Chile; Barbara Alejandra Gomez; Fabiola Alejandra Pavez	3:51.89
2nd place, silver medalist(s)	Colombia; Aura María Ospina; Tatiana Muñoz	3:52.75
3rd place, bronze medalist(s)	Brazil; Juliana Domingos; Naiane Pereira	3:54.05
4	Argentina; Maria Cecilia Collueque; Maria Fernanda Lauro	3:54.97
5	Venezuela; Eliana Escalona; Vanessa Yorsel Silva	4:00.00
