= Canoeing at the 2006 Central American and Caribbean Games =

Cartagena, Colombia

- Location: Cartagena
- Dates: 15-30 July

The Bowling competition at the 2006 Central American and Caribbean Games was held in Cartagena, Colombia. The tournament was scheduled to be held from 15–30 July 2006.

== Medal summary ==
=== Men's events ===
Event	Gold		Silver		Bronze	
K1 500 m	Mexico; Manuel Cortina	1:38.910	Venezuela; Marcel Bennett	1:39.850	Cuba; Maikel Zulueta	1:44.330
K1 1000 m	Cuba; Maikel Zilieta	3:38.380	Venezuela; José Giovanni Ramos	3:40.350	Guatemala; Luis Estrada	3:48.570
K2 500 m	Venezuela; José Giovanni Ramos; Gabriel Rodriguez	1:29.420	Mexico; Ricardo Reza; Manuela Cortina	1:31.310	Cuba; Ernesto Delgado; Maikel Zulueta	1:32.590
K2 1000 m	Cuba; Maikel Zulueta; Jorge Garcia	3:15.830	Venezuela; Marcel Bennett; Marcos Perez	3:17.450	Mexico; Manuel Cortina; Ricardo Reza	3:29.170
K4 1000 m	Cuba; Maikel Zulueta; Jorge Garcia; Carlos Montalvo; Reinier Torres	2:55.510	Mexico; Manuel Cortina; Carlos Garcia; Agustin Medinilla; Jesus Valdez	3:00.630	Venezuela; Marcel Bennett; José Giovanni Ramos; Jesus Colmenares; Gabriel Rodriguez	3:12.190
C1 500 m	Cuba; Aldo Pruna	1:48.070	Mexico; Jose Quirino	1:48.420	Venezuela; Ronny Ratia	1:56.660
C1 1000 m	Mexico; Jose Quirino	4:01.840	Cuba; Serguey Torres	4:07.770	Venezuela; Jose Silva	4:28.090
C2 500 m	Cuba; Karel Aguilar; Serguey Torres	1:39.980	Mexico; Gabriel Castillo; Leslyn Rodriguez	1:42.410	Venezuela; Eduard Paredes; Jose Ribas	1:45.410
C2 1000 m	Cuba; Karel Aguilar; Serguey Torres	3:39.920	Mexico; Francisco Capultitla; Gabriel Castillo	3:45.470	Venezuela; Ronny Ratia; Jose Silva	3:54.810

=== Women's events ===
Event	Gold		Silver		Bronze	
K1 500 m	Cuba; Yulitza Meneses	1:54.150	Mexico; Denisse Olivella	1:55.310	Colombia; Aura María Ospina	1:56.660
K2 500 m	Cuba; Yulitza Meneses; Arasay Andino	1:44.480	Venezuela; Ladimar Hernandez; Andreina Silva	1:46.970	Mexico; Bertha Garcia; Anca Ionela	1:47.950
K4 500 m	Cuba; Lianet Alvarez; Arasay Andino; Yulitza Meneses; Annes Penate	1:36.830	Venezuela; Andreina Silva; Eliana Escalona; Ladimar Hernandez; Andreina Colmenares	1:38.030	Mexico; Anais Abraham; Bertha Garcia; Anca Ionela; Carla Salinas	1:40.580

== Medal table ==
* Host nation (Colombia)

Rank	Nation	Gold	Silver	Bronze	Total
1	Cuba	9	1	2	12
2	Mexico	2	6	3	11
3	Venezuela	1	5	5	11
4	Colombia*	0	0	1	1
4	Guatemala	0	0	1	1
Totals (5 entries)		12	12	12	36
