= Canoeing at the 2007 Pan American Games =

Canoeing at the 2007 Pan American Games took place at the Lagoa Rodrigo de Freitas, the same venue that hosted the Rowing and Water Skiing. Although the initial intention of the Organizing Committee was to have the whole Olympic program at the Pan American Games, the slalom competitions were abandoned due to the few number of probable participating countries.

The competition in Flatwater Racing comprised the twelve Olympic Events. In the 2003 Pan American Games, Cuba lead the medal tally with five gold medals, with the United States in second (three golds, one silver and one bronze) and Argentina and Canada tied in third with two golds, two silvers and three bronzes.

The 1.000m events' heats and semifinals took place on July 26 and the heats and semifinals of the 500m events on July 27. The 1.000m finals (and the Women's K-4 500m final) were held on July 27 and the other 500m finals on July 28.

== Medal table ==
* Host nation (Brazil)

Rank	Nation	Gold	Silver	Bronze	Total
1	Mexico	5	1	1	7
2	Cuba	3	4	2	9
3	Canada	3	2	2	7
4	Brazil*	1	2	3	6
5	Argentina	0	2	1	3
6	Venezuela	0	1	3	4
Totals (6 entries)		12	12	12	36

== Medalists ==
=== Men's events ===
Event	Gold	Silver	Bronze
C-1 500 metres	José Cristóbal; Mexico	Aldo Pruna; Cuba	Nivalter Santos; Brazil
C-1 1000 metres	José Cristóbal; Mexico	Reydel Ramos; Cuba	Benjamin Russell; Canada
C-2 500 metres	Cuba; Karel Aguilar; Serguey Torres	Mexico; Gilberto Soriano; José Cristóbal	Brazil; Vilson Nascimento; Wladimir Moreno
C-2 1000 metres	Cuba; Karel Aguilar; Serguey Torres	Brazil; Vilson Nascimento; Wladimir Moreno	Venezuela; Eduard Paredes; José Silva
K-1 500 metres	Manuel Cortina; Mexico	Angus Mortimer; Canada	Edson Isaias; Brazil
K-1 1000 metres	Angus Mortimer; Canada	Sebastian Cuattrin; Brazil	Jorge García; Cuba
K-2 500 metres	Mexico; Jesús Váldez; Manuel Cortina	Cuba; Jorge García; Maikel Zulueta	Argentina; Pablo de Torres; Juan Pablo Bergero
K-2 1000 metres	Mexico; Jesús Váldez; Manuel Cortina	Argentina; Pablo de Torres; Juan Pablo Bergero	Venezuela; José Giovanni Ramos; Gabriel Rodríguez
K-4 1000 metres	Brazil; Roberto Maehler; Carlos Campos; Sebastian Cuattrin; Edson Isaias	Canada; Chris Pellini; Angus Mortimer; Mark de Jonge; Jeremy Bordeleau	Cuba; Eliecer Rodríguez; Maikel Zulueta; Jorge García; Carlos Montalvo

=== Women's events ===
Event	Gold	Silver	Bronze
K-1 500 metres	Jillian D'Alessio; Canada	Fernanda Lauro; Argentina	Anca Ionela Mateescu; Mexico
K-2 500 metres	Canada; Kia Byers; Marie-Christine Schmidt	Cuba; Yulitza Meneses; Lianet Álvarez	Venezuela; Ladymar Hernández; Eliana Escalona
K-4 500 metres	Cuba; Darisleydis Amador; Yulitza Meneses; Lianet Álvarez; Dayexi Gandarela	Venezuela; Eliana Escalona; Vanessa Silva; Ladymar Hernández; Zulmarys Sánchez	Canada; Jillian D'Alessio; Kia Byers; Camille Tessier-Bussières; Marie-Christine Schmidt
