= Mark de Jonge =

Canadian sprint canoeist

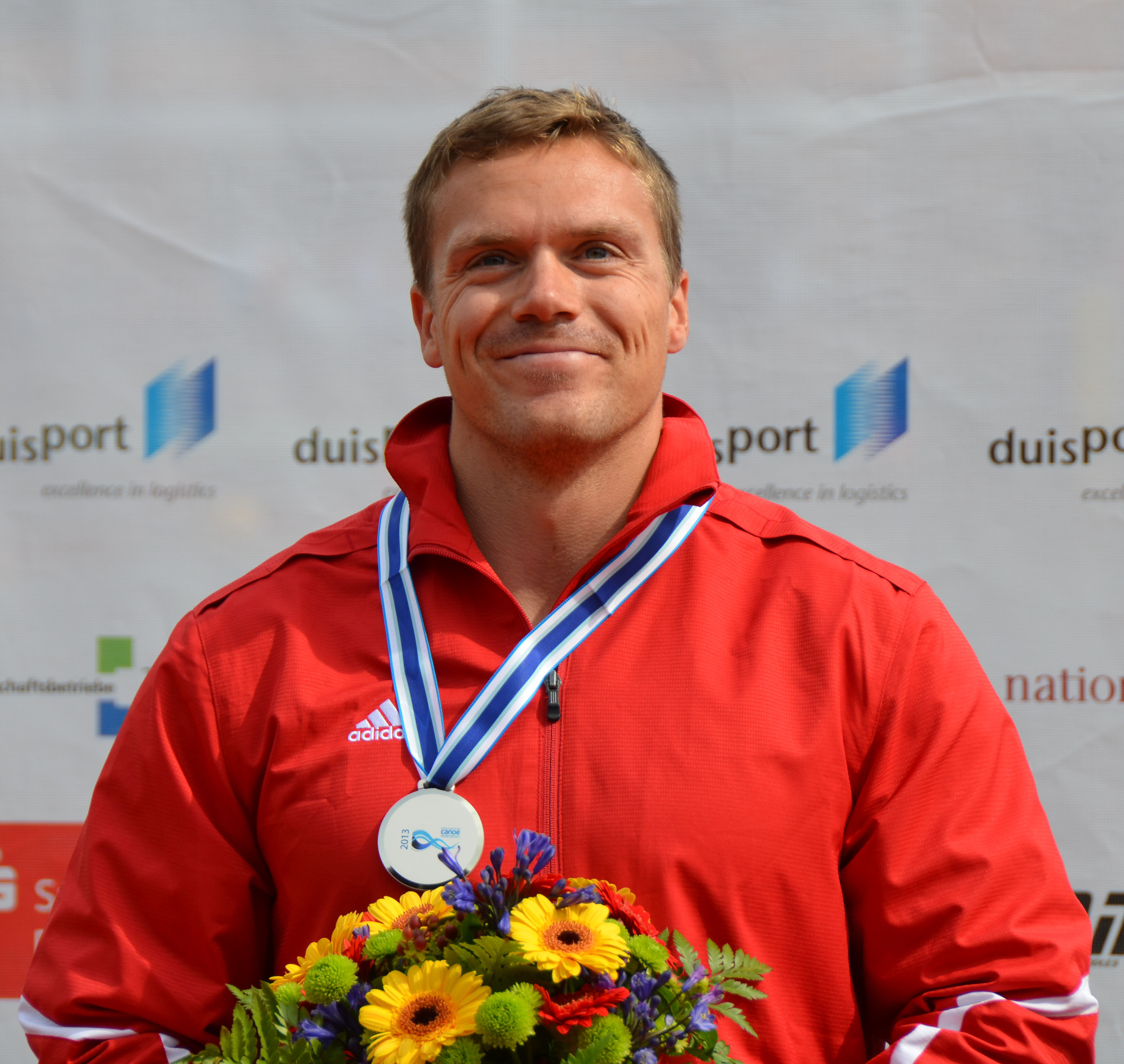
- De Jonge at the 2013 World Championships

Personal information
- Born: February 15, 1984 (age 42) Calgary, Alberta, Canada
- Home town: Halifax, Nova Scotia, Canada
- Height: 180 cm (5 ft 11 in)
- Weight: 91 kg (201 lb)

Sport
- Sport: Kayaking
- Event: 200 m
Medal record
Men's canoe sprint
Representing Canada
Olympic Games
Bronze medal – third place	2012 London	K-1 200 m
World Championships
Gold medal – first place	2014 Moscow	K-1 200 m
Gold medal – first place	2015 Milan	K-1 200 m
Silver medal – second place	2013 Duisburg	K-1 200 m
Pan American Games
Gold medal – first place	2015 Toronto	K-1 200 m
Silver medal – second place	2007 Rio de Janeiro	K-4 1,000 m
Bronze medal – third place	2003 Santo Domingo	K-1 500 m
Bronze medal – third place	2015 Toronto	K-2 200 m

Mark de Jonge (born 15 February 1984) is a Canadian male sprint canoeist, primarily specializing the 200 m kayak event. De Jonge won a bronze medal in the K-1 200 m at the 2012 Summer Olympics in London. He is the two time reigning world champion in same event having also won a silver medal at the ICF Canoe Sprint World Championships in 2013. He is also the current Pan American champion in the 200 having won gold in Toronto at the 2015 Pan American Games in Toronto, where he also won an additional bronze, and a silver and bronze at previous editions of the Pan Am Games. He was named the Air Canada Athlete of the Year in 2015 for Canada.

== Career ==
Born in Calgary in 1984, de Jonge moved to Halifax in 1997 where he started kayaking. His parents enrolled him in the popular local sport at the Maskwa Aquatics Club as a way of getting to know other children in the area.

Despite being a competitive kayaker he missed out on the 2004 and 2008 editions of the Summer Olympics. He did win a silver medal at the 2007 Pan American Games in the men's K-4 1,000 metres event, alongside Angus Mortimer, Jeremy Bordeleau and Chris Pellini.

In the 2012 Summer Olympics he won bronze in the K-1 200 metres event. When the quick sprint 200 m event was added to the Olympics de Jonge saw his opportunities flourish, as the event suited his skill set aptly. Yet he missed out on most of the qualifying events after he dropped an 80lb weight on his finger training in 2012. Despite the injury he still managed to win the national trials and qualify for the 2012 Summer Olympics. There he won a bronze in the inaugural event. After he said "Obviously, I did want gold. But I was never thinking about the result. I’m happy with the bronze. I’m really happy that I had an awesome race out there, three really good races at the Olympics. I’m proud that, when the time came, I was really ready to go."

De Jonge built off the Olympic success winning his first world cup medal the following year, he then won a silver in the 200 at the 2013 ICF Canoe Sprint World Championships. At the 2014 ICF Canoe Sprint World Championships he won his first world championships title while also setting the world record in the semi-finals on his way to the title. With the win in Moscow he said that "For years I've sort of dreamed of this moment." de Jonge repeated as world champion at the 2015 world championships and in December was named the 2015 Air Canada athlete of the year through an online voting process.

In May 2021, de Jonge was named to Canada's 2020 Olympic team.

== Personal ==
De Jonge graduated from Dalhousie University in Halifax with a degree in civil engineering in 2009. He worked full-time for three years with Stantec Consulting as an engineer-in-training before he took a leave of absence to focus on kayaking before the 2012 Olympics.

In 2018 he was named one of the greatest 15 athletes in Nova Scotia's history.
