= Canoeing at the 1991 Pan American Games =

Canoeing at the 1991 Pan American Games took place in Havana, Cuba.

== Medal table ==
Place	Nation	Gold medal	Silver medal	Bronze medal	Total
1	Cuba	10	3	0	13
2	Canada	2	4	6	12
3	United States	1	3	5	9
4	Mexico	0	2	1	3
5	Argentina	0	1	1	2
Total		13	13	13	39

== Men's events ==
Event	Gold	Silver	Bronze
C-1 500 metres	Armando Silega; Cuba	Paul Pageau; Canada	José Ferrer; Mexico
C-2 500 metres	Cuba; Juan Aballí; Fernando Zamora	Mexico; Juan Martínez; Alfredo Morales	Canada; Gavin Maxwell; James O'Leary
C-1 1000 metres	Armando Silega; Cuba	Paul Pageau; Canada	Fred Spaulding; United States
C-2 1000 metres	Cuba; Juan Aballí; Fernando Zamora	Mexico; José Antonio Romero; José Ferrer	Canada; Gavin Maxwell; James O'Leary
K-1 500 metres	Ángel Pérez; Cuba	Mike Herbert; United States	Scott Kerrigan; Canada
K-2 500 metres	Cuba; Angel Pérez; Luís Fernández	United States; Mark Hamilton; Peter Newton	Argentina; Maurício Vergauven; José Luis Marello
K-1 1000 metres	Mike Herbert; United States	Ángel Pérez; Cuba	Peter Giles; Canada
K-2 1000 metres	Cuba; Marlo Marcheco; Luís Estévez	Argentina; Maurício Vergauven; José Luis Marello	Canada; Peter Giles; Alan Gibb
K-4 500 metres	Cuba; Angel Pérez; Luís Fernández; Marlo Marcheco; Luís Estévez	Canada; Scott Kerrigan; Jason Moffat; Jeff Allbon; Ashley McColgan	United States; Mitch Kahn; Chris Barlow; Curt Bader; Patrick Richardson
K-4 1000 metres	Cuba; Angel Pérez; Luís Fernández; Marlo Marcheco; Luís Estévez	United States; Mitch Kahn; Chris Barlow; Curt Bader; Patrick Richardson	Canada; Scott Kerrigan; Jason Moffat; Jeff Allbon; Ashley McColgan

== Women's events ==
Event	Gold	Silver	Bronze
K-1 500 metres	Corrina Kennedy; Canada	Tatiana Valdés; Cuba	Megan Duffy; United States
K-2 500 metres	Canada; Tessa Desouza; Corrina Kennedy	Cuba; Tatiana Valdés; Mirlenis Aguilera	United States; Sharon Attlesey; DeAnne Hemmens
K-4 500 metres	Cuba; Tatiana Valdés; Mirlenis Aguilera; Elisa Zaldívar; Yamilé Ley	Canada; Tessa Desouza; Corrina Kennedy; Lucy Slade; Leslie Young	United States; Lori Schick; Sharon Attlesey; DeAnne Hemmens; Helen Collins
