= Chris Pellini =

Canadian sprint kayaker

Personal information
- Born: February 10, 1984 (age 42) Mississauga, Canada

Sport
- Sport: Canoeing
Medal record
Representing Canada
Men's canoe sprint
Pan American Games
Silver medal – second place	2007 Rio de Janeiro	K-4 1000 m

Christopher Pellini (born February 10, 1984) is a Canadian sprint kayaker. He won a silver medal at the 2007 Pan American Games in the men's K-4 1,000 metres event, alongside Angus Mortimer, Jeremy Bordeleau and Mark de Jonge.

He also competed at the 2008 Summer Olympics in Beijing, finishing ninth in the K-4 1000 m event.
