= Jeremy Bordeleau =

Canadian canoeist

Personal information
- Born: April 30, 1987 (age 39) Trois-Rivières, Quebec, Canada
Medal record
Men's Canoeing
Representing Canada
Pan American Games
Silver medal – second place	2007 Rio de Janeiro	K-4 1,000 m

Jeremy Bordeleau (born April 30, 1987, in Trois-Rivières, Quebec) is a male athlete who competes in canoeing. He won a silver medal at the 2007 Pan American Games in the men's K-4 1,000 metres event, along with Angus Mortimer, Mark de Jonge and Chris Pellini.

== See also ==
- List of canoe/kayak athletes by country
