= Marie-Christine Schmidt =

Canadian sprint kayaker

Personal information
- Born: August 19, 1986 (age 39)
Medal record
Women's Canoeing
Representing Canada
Pan American Games
Gold medal – first place	2007 Rio de Janeiro	K-2 500 m

Marie-Christine Schmidt (born August 19, 1986 in LaSalle, Quebec) is a Canadian sprint kayaker. She won a gold medal at the 2007 Pan American Games in the women's K-2 500 metres event, alongside Kia Byers.

== See also ==
- List of Canoe/Kayak athletes by Country
