= Corrina Kennedy =

Canadian sprint kayaker (born 1970)

Personal information
- Born: November 30, 1970 (age 55) Saskatoon, Saskatchewan, Canada

Sport
- Sport: Canoeing
Medal record
Representing Canada
World Championships
Gold medal – first place	1995 Duisburg	K-2 200 m
Gold medal – first place	1995 Duisburg	K-4 200 m
Silver medal – second place	1997 Dartmouth	K-4 200 m
Bronze medal – third place	1994 Mexico City	K-4 200 m
Pan American Games
Gold medal – first place	1991 Havana	K-1 500 m
Gold medal – first place	1991 Havana	K-2 500 m
Silver medal – second place	1991 Havana	K-4 500 m

Corrina Kennedy (born November 30, 1970) is a Canadian sprint kayaker who competed in the mid-to-late 1990s. She won four medals at the ICF Canoe Sprint World Championships with two golds (K-2 200 m and K-4 200 m: both 1995), a silver (K-4 200 m: 1997) and a bronze (K-4 200 m: 1994).

Kennedy also competed at the 1996 Summer Olympics in Atlanta, finishing fifth both the K-2 500 m and the K-4 500 m events.
