= Jonas Ecker =

American canoeist (born 2002)

Personal information
- Born: October 26, 2002 (age 23)
- Home town: Bellingham, Washington, U.S.
- Education: University of Washington
- Height: 6 ft (183 cm)

Sport
- Country: United States
- Sport: Sprint kayak
- Events: K-1 1000 m, K-1 500m, K-2 500 m, K-4 500m
- Club: Bellingham Canoe and Kayak Sprint Team
Medal record
Representing United States
Pan American Games
Silver medal – second place	2023 Santiago	K-1 1000 m
Bronze medal – third place	2023 Santiago	K-2 500 m
ICF Junior and U23 World Championships
Bronze medal – third place	2022 Szeged	K-2 500m
Gold medal – first place	2024 Plovdiv	K-1 1000m
Gold medal – first place	2025 Montemor-o-Velho	K-1 1000m
Gold medal – first place	2025 Montemor-o-Velho	K-1 500m
COPAC Pan American Championships
Gold medal – first place	2022 Halifax	K-2 500m
Bronze medal – third place	2022 Halifax	K-1 1000m
Gold medal – first place	2024 Sarasota	K-2 500m
Silver medal – second place	2024 Sarasota	K-1 1000m
Gold medal – first place	2026 Montreal	K-1 500m
Silver medal – second place	2026 Montreal	K-4 500m

Jonas Ecker (born October 26, 2002) is an American sprint kayaker. He qualified to represent the United States at the 2024 Summer Olympics. He also won two medals at the 2023 Pan American Games, a silver in the K-1 1000 meters event and a bronze in the K-2 500 meters event.

== Biography ==
Ecker was born on October 26, 2002. He grew up in Bellingham, Washington. He attended Bellingham's Sehome High School and later attended the University of Washington, where he majored in marine biology.

Ecker started paddling at age 12 with the Bellingham Canoe and Kayak Sprint Team. He participated at the National Sprint Championships and reached the finals of his age group in 2016. He also competed at the Junior Ski to Sea Race several times and began competing at the main event in 2018. He became a member of the United States national sprint canoeing team in 2018. He won the national sprint canoe championship in 2021 and 2022 while also winning the 2022 U.S. Canoe Spring National Team Trials.

Ecker partnered with Aaron Small in 2022 for K-2 canoeing events. He competed at the 2023 Pan American Games in Santiago, Chile, and won two medals: winning silver in the K-1 1000 meters event and winning bronze with Small at the K-2 500 meters event. In 2024, he competed at the Canoe Sprint Americas Continental Olympic Qualifier with Small and they won in the finals in the K-2 500 meters event, securing a place at the 2024 Summer Olympics in Paris. In 2025, he competed at the ICF Junior and U23 World Championships, winning gold in both the K-1 1000m and the K-1 500m.
