= Events at the 2007 Pan American Games =

This is a list of the sporting events that took place at the 2007 Panamerican Games, held in Rio de Janeiro, from July 13–29, 2007.

== Archery ==
- Men's
  - Individual competition
  - Team competition
- Women's
  - Individual competition
  - Team competition

== Aquatics ==
=== Diving ===
- Men's
  - 3 m Springboard
  - 10 m Platform
  - 3 m Synchronized Springboard
  - 10 m Synchronized Platform
- Women's
  - 3 m Springboard
  - 10 m Platform
  - 3 m Synchronized Springboard
  - 10 m Synchronized Platform

=== Open water swimming ===
- Men's
  - 10 km
- Women's
  - 10 km

=== Swimming ===
- Men's
  - 50 m Freestyle
  - 100 m Freestyle
  - 200 m Freestyle
  - 400 m Freestyle
  - 1,500 m Freestyle
  - 100 m Backstroke
  - 200 m Backstroke
  - 100 m Breaststroke
  - 200 m Breaststroke
  - 100 m Butterfly
  - 200 m Butterfly
  - 200 m Individual Medley
  - 400 m Individual Medley
  - 4 × 100 m Freestyle Relay
  - 4 × 200 m Freestyle Relay
  - 4 × 100 m Medley Relay
- Women's
  - 50 m Freestyle
  - 100 m Freestyle
  - 200 m Freestyle
  - 400 m Freestyle
  - 800 m Freestyle
  - 100 m Backstroke
  - 200 m Backstroke
  - 100 m Breaststroke
  - 200 m Breaststroke
  - 100 m Butterfly
  - 200 m Butterfly
  - 200 m Individual Medley
  - 400 m Individual Medley
  - 4 × 100 m Freestyle Relay
  - 4 × 200 m Freestyle Relay
  - 4 × 100 m Medley Relay

=== Synchronized swimming ===
- Women's
  - Duet
  - Team

=== Water polo ===
- Men's
  - 8-Team Event
- Women's
  - 6-Team Event

== Athletics ==
- Men's
  - 100 m
  - 200 m
  - 400 m
  - 800 m
  - 1,500 m
  - 5,000 m
  - 10,000 m
  - 110 m hurdles
  - 400 m hurdles
  - 3,000 m Steeplechase
  - Marathon
  - 20 km Walk
  - 50 km Walk
  - 4 × 100 m Relay
  - 4 × 400 m Relay
  - Long jump
  - Triple jump
  - High jump
  - Pole vault
  - Shot put
  - Discus throw
  - Javelin throw
  - Hammer throw
  - Decathlon
- Women's
  - 100 m
  - 200 m
  - 400 m
  - 800 m
  - 1,500 m
  - 5,000 m
  - 10,000 m
  - 110 m hurdles
  - 400 m hurdles
  - 3,000 m Steeplechase
  - Marathon
  - 20 km Walk
  - 4 × 100 m Relay
  - 4 × 400 m Relay
  - Long jump
  - Triple jump
  - High jump
  - Pole vault
  - Shot put
  - Discus throw
  - Javelin throw
  - Hammer throw
  - Heptathlon

== Badminton ==
- Men's
  - Individual Event
  - Doubles Event
- Women's
  - Individual Event
  - Doubles Event
- Mixed
  - Mixed Doubles Event

== Baseball ==
- Men's
  - 8-Team Event

== Basketball ==
- Men's
  - 8-Team Event
- Women's
  - 8-Team Event

== Beach volleyball ==
- Men's
  - Men's Competition
- Women's
  - Women's Competition

== Bowling ==
- Men's
  - Individual Event
  - Doubles Event
- Women's
  - Individual Event
  - Doubles Event

== Boxing ==
- Men's
  - Light flyweight (-48 kg)
  - Flyweight (48–51 kg)
  - Bantamweight (51–54 kg)
  - Featherweight (54–57 kg)
  - Lightweight (57–60 kg)
  - Light welterweight (60–64 kg)
  - Welterweight (64–69 kg)
  - Middleweight (69–75 kg)
  - Light heavyweight (75–81 kg)
  - Heavyweight (81–91 kg)
  - Super heavyweight (+91 kg)

== Canoe racing ==
- Men's
  - K-1 500 m
  - K-2 500m
  - K-1 1,000 m
  - K-2 1,000 m
  - K-4 1,000 m
  - C-1 500m
  - C-2 500 m
  - C-1 1,000 m
  - C-2 1,000 m
- Women's
  - K-1 500 m
  - K-2 500m
  - K-4 500 m

== Cycling ==
=== BMX ===
- Men's
  - Men's Competition
- Women's
  - Women's Competition

=== Mountain bike ===
- Men's
  - Men's Competition
- Women's
  - Women's Competition

=== Road ===
- Men's
  - Mass Start
  - Individual Time Trial
- Women's
  - Mass Start
  - Individual Time Trial

=== Track ===
- Men's
  - Sprint
  - Team Sprint
  - Individual Pursuit
  - Team Pursuit
  - Madison
  - Keirin
  - Points Race
- Women's
  - Sprint
  - Individual Pursuit
  - Points Race

== Equestrian ==
=== Eventing ===
- Mixed
  - Individual 3-Day Event
  - Team 3-Day Event

=== Dressage ===
- Mixed
  - Individual Dressage
  - Team Dressage

=== Show jumping ===
- Mixed
  - Individual Jumping
  - Team Jumping

== Fencing ==
- Men's
  - Individual Epee
  - Individual Foil
  - Individual Sabre
  - Team Épée
  - Team Sabre
- Women's
  - Individual Épée
  - Individual Foil
  - Individual Sabre
  - Team Foil
  - Team Sabre

== Football ==
- Men's
  - 12-Team Event
- Women's
  - 10-Team Event

== Futsal ==
- Men's
  - Men's Competition

== Gymnastics ==
=== Artistic ===
- Men's
  - Team All-Around
  - Individual All-Around
  - Floor
  - Pommel Horse
  - Rings
  - Vault
  - Parallel Bars
  - Horizontal Bar
- Women's
  - Team All-Around
  - Individual All-Around
  - Vault
  - Uneven Bars
  - Balance Beam
  - Floor

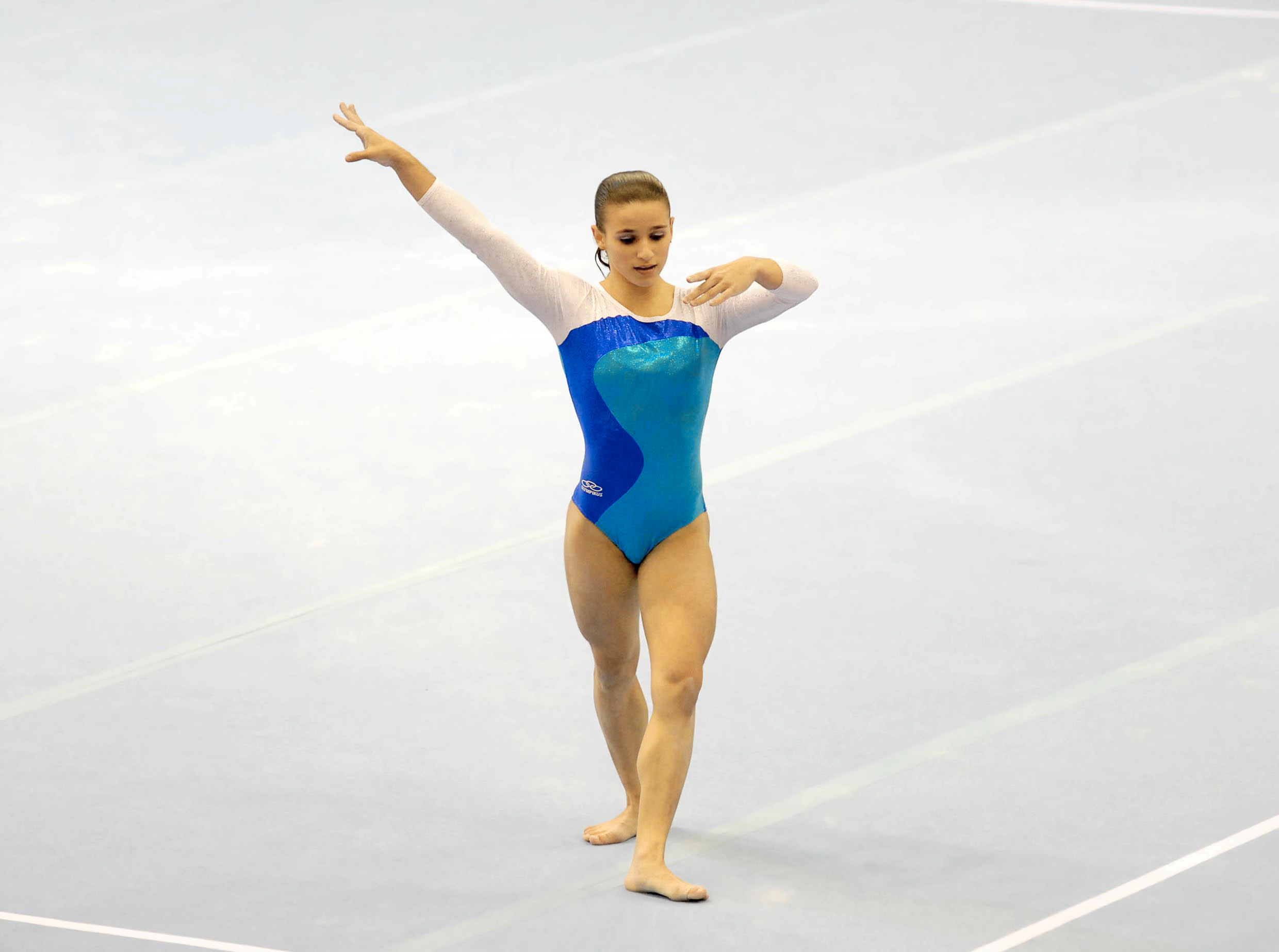
Brazilian artistic gymnast Jade Barbosa during her floor routine at the 2007 Pan American Games.

=== Rhythmic ===
- Women's
  - Individual All-Around
  - Group All-Around
  - Individual Apparatus 1
  - Individual Apparatus 2
  - Individual Apparatus 3
  - Individual Apparatus 4
  - Group Apparatus 1
  - Group Apparatus 2

=== Trampolining ===
- Men's
  - Individual
- Women's
  - Individual

== Handball ==
- Men's
  - 8-Team Event
- Women's
  - 8-Team Event

== Field hockey ==
- Men's
  - 8-Team Event
- Women's
  - 8-Team Event

== Judo ==
- Men's
  - 60 kg
  - 66 kg
  - 73 kg
  - 81 kg
  - 90 kg
  - 100 kg
  - Over 100 kg
- Women's
  - 48 kg
  - 52 kg
  - 57 kg
  - 63 kg
  - 70 kg
  - 78 kg
  - Over 78 kg

== Karate ==
- Men's
  - 60 kg
  - 65 kg
  - 70 kg
  - 75 kg
  - 80 kg
  - Over 80 kg
- Women's
  - 53 kg
  - 60 kg
  - Over 60 kg

== Modern pentathlon ==
- Men's
  - Individual Competition
- Women's
  - Individual Competition

== Rowing ==
- Men's
  - Single Sculls
  - Pairs
  - Double Sculls
  - Fours
  - Quadruple Sculls
  - Eights
  - Double Sculls Lightweight
  - Fours Lightweight
- Women's
  - Single Sculls
  - Double Sculls
  - Quadruple Sculls
  - Double Sculls Lightweight

== Sailing ==
- Men's
  - Neil Pryde RS:X
  - Laser
- Women's
  - Neil Pryde RS:X
  - Laser Radial
- Mixed
  - Sunfish
  - Snipe
  - Hobie Cat 16
  - Lightning
  - J/24

== Shooting ==
- Men's
  - 10 m Air Pistol
  - 25 m Rapid Fire Pistol
  - 50m Pistol
  - 10 m Air Rifle
  - 50m Rifle Three Positions
  - 50m Rifle Prone
  - Trap
  - Double Trap
  - Skeet
- Women's
  - 10 m Air Pistol
  - 25m Sport Pistol
  - 10 m Air Rifle
  - 50m Rifle Three Positions
  - Trap
  - Skeet

== Skating ==
=== Speed skating ===
- Men's
  - Combined Sprint
  - Combined Distance
- Women's
  - Combined Sprint
  - Combined Distance

=== Figure skating ===
- Men's
  - Individual Competition
- Women's
  - Individual Competition

== Softball ==
- Women's
  - 8-Team Event

== Squash ==
- Men's
  - Individual Competition
  - Team Competition
- Women's
  - Individual Competition
  - Team Competition

== Table tennis ==
- Men's
  - Individual Competition
  - Team Competition
- Women's
  - Individual Competition
  - Team Competition

== Taekwondo ==
- Men's
  - 58 kg
  - 68 kg
  - 80 kg
  - Over 80 kg
- Women's
  - 49 kg
  - 57 kg
  - 67 kg
  - Over 67 kg

== Tennis ==
- Men's
  - Individual Competition
  - Doubles Competition
- Women's
  - Individual Competition
  - Doubles Competition

== Triathlon ==
- Men's
  - Individual Competition
- Women's
  - Individual Competition

== Volleyball ==
- Men's
  - 8-Team Event
- Women's
  - 8-Team Event

== Water skiing ==
- Men's
  - Slalom
  - Jump
  - Tricks
  - Wakeboard
- Women's
  - Slalom
  - Jump
  - Tricks

== Weightlifting ==
- Men's
  - 56 kg
  - 62 kg
  - 69 kg
  - 77 kg
  - 85 kg
  - 94 kg
  - 105 kg
  - Over 105 kg
- Women's
  - 48 kg
  - 53 kg
  - 58 kg
  - 63 kg
  - 69 kg
  - 75 kg
  - Over 75 kg

== Wrestling ==
=== Freestyle ===
- Men's
  - 55 kg
  - 60 kg
  - 66 kg
  - 74 kg
  - 84 kg
  - 96 kg
  - 120 kg

=== Greco-Roman ===
- Men's
  - 55 kg
  - 60 kg
  - 66 kg
  - 74 kg
  - 84 kg
  - 96 kg
  - 120 kg

=== Women's ===
- Women's
  - 48 kg
  - 55 kg
  - 63 kg
  - 72 kg
