= Traci Phillips =

American canoeist (born 1962)

Personal information
- Born: Tracey Elizabeth Phillips; August 1, 1962 (age 63) Honolulu, Hawaii
Medal record
Women's Canoeing
Representing United States
Pan American Games
Gold medal – first place	1987 Indianapolis	K-1 500 m
Gold medal – first place	1987 Indianapolis	K-4 500 m

Tracey Elizabeth "Traci" Phillips (born August 1, 1962) is an American sprint canoer who competed from the late 1980s to the mid-1990s. Competing in three Summer Olympics, she earned her best finish of sixth in the K-1 500 m event at Seoul in 1988. At the time, her height was 5 ft 3.5 in (161.3 cm) and weight was 121 lb (55 kg)
