= Curt Bader =

American canoeist (born 1961)

Personal information
- Born: January 5, 1961 (age 65) Bloomfield, Iowa, United States

Sport
- Sport: Canoeing
Medal record
Representing United States
Pan American Games
Gold medal – first place	1987 Indianapolis	K-4 1000m
Silver medal – second place	1991 Havana	K-4 500m
Silver medal – second place	1995 Mar del Plata	K-500m
Bronze medal – third place	1991 Havana	K-500m

Curtis Jay "Curt" Bader (born January 5, 1961) is an American sprint canoer who competed from the late 1980s to the mid-1990s. He was eliminated in the semifinals of the K-4 1000 m event at the 1988 Summer Olympics in Seoul. Eight years later in Atlanta, Bader was eliminated in the semifinals of the same event.
