= Gavin Maxwell (canoeist) =

Canadian canoeist

Personal information
- Born: August 28, 1970 (age 55) Mississauga, Ontario, Canada

Sport
- Sport: Canoeing
Medal record
Representing Canada
Pan American Games
Bronze medal – third place	1991 Havana	C-2 500m
Bronze medal – third place	1991 Havana	C-2 1000m

Gavin Maxwell (born August 28, 1970) is a Canadian sprint canoer who competed in the mid-1990s. He was eliminated in the semifinals of the C-1 1000 m event at the 1996 Summer Olympics in Atlanta. He is now a chiropractor in Mississauga, Ontario.
