= DeAnne Hemmens =

American canoeist (born 1964)

Personal information
- Born: July 2, 1964 (age 61) San Francisco, California, United States

Sport
- Sport: Canoeing
Medal record
Representing United States
Pan American Games
Gold medal – first place	1995 Mar del Plata	K-2 500m
Silver medal – second place	1995 Mar del Plata	K-4 500m
Bronze medal – third place	1991 Havana	K-2 500m
Bronze medal – third place	1991 Havana	K-4 500m

DeAnne Hemmens (born July 2, 1964) is an American sprint kayak who competed in the mid-1990s. At the 1996 Summer Olympics in Atlanta, she was eliminated in the semifinals of both the K-2 500 m and the K-4 500 m events.

She later competed in both surf ski and lifesaving events.
