= José Giovanni Ramos =

Venezuelan canoeist (born 1983)

Personal information
- Born: 12 April 1983 (age 43) El Tocuyo, Venezuela

Sport
- Sport: Canoeing
Medal record
Representing Venezuela
Pan American Games
Bronze medal – third place	2007 Rio de Janeiro	K-2 1000 m
Central American and Caribbean Games
Gold medal – first place	2006 Cartagena	K-2 500 m
Silver medal – second place	2006 Cartagena	K-2 1000 m
Bronze medal – third place	2006 Cartagena	K-4 1000 m
Bronze medal – third place	2006 Cartagena	K-4 1000 m

José Giovanni Ramos (born April 12, 1983) is a Venezuelan sprint canoer who competed in the late 2000s. At the 2008 Summer Olympics in Beijing, he was eliminated in the semifinals of both the K-2 500 m and the K-2 1000 m events.
