= Karel Aguilar Chacón =

Cuban canoeist (born 1980)

Karel Aguilar
Personal information
- Full name: Karel Aguilar Chacón
- Born: 5 April 1980 (age 46) Camagüey, Cuba
Medal record
Men's canoe sprint
Representing Cuba
World Championships
Silver medal – second place	2005 Zagreb	C-2 1000 m
Silver medal – second place	2007 Duisburg	C-2 1000 m
Bronze medal – third place	2005 Zagreb	C-2 200 m
Bronze medal – third place	2005 Zagreb	C-2 500 m
Pan American Games
Gold medal – first place	2003 Santo Domingo	C-1 500 m
Gold medal – first place	2007 Rio de Janeiro	C-2 500 m
Gold medal – first place	2007 Rio de Janeiro	C-2 1000 m
Central American and Caribbean Games
Gold medal – first place	2006 Cartagena	C-2 500 m
Gold medal – first place	2006 Cartagena	C-2 1000 m

Karel Aguilar Chacón (born 5 April 1980) is an athlete from Cuba. He competes in sprint canoeing.

His first major success came in 2003 when he won the C-1 500 m gold medal at the Pan American Games in Santo Domingo, Dominican Republic. Two weeks later, at the world championships in Gainesville, USA he reached two finals, finishing fourth in the C-1 500 m and eight in the C-1 1000 m.

Chacon competed at the 2004 Summer Olympics, this time in the C-1 1000 m. He placed third in his initial heat with a time of 3:54.250, qualifying for the semifinals. There, he placed second, this time at 3:52.260 to qualify for the final. In the final, Chacon placed eighth with a time of 3:54.957.

After the 2004 Olympics, he and Serguey Torres were chosen as Cuba's new C-2 pairing for international competitions. Replacing the former world champions and Olympic medallists Ibrahim Rojas and Ledys Frank Balceiro was no easy task but Aguilar and Torres enjoyed immediate success at the 2005 World Championships in Zagreb, Croatia. They won medals in all three C-2 races - silver in the 1000 m and bronze in the 200 m and 500 m events. The pair also won another silver in the C-2 1000 m event at the 2007 championships and earned their best finish in the same event at the 2008 Summer Olympics.
