= Fernanda Lauro =

Argentine canoeist (born 1978)

Personal information
- Born: December 2, 1978 (age 47) Resistencia, Chaco, Argentina

Sport
- Sport: Canoeing
Medal record
Representing Argentina
Pan American Games
Silver medal – second place	2003 Santo Domingo	K-1 500m
Silver medal – second place	2007 Rio de Janeiro	K-1 500m

María Fernanda Lauro (born December 2, 1978) is an Argentine sprint canoer. She competed in the mid-2000s.

At the 2004 Summer Olympics in Athens, Lauro was eliminated in the semifinals of the K-1 500 m event.
