= Terry Kent (canoeist) =

American canoeist (born 1962)

Personal information
- Born: August 8, 1962 (age 64) Lake Placid, New York, United States

Sport
- Sport: Canoeing
Medal record
Representing United States
World Championships
Silver medal – second place	1990 Poznań	K-2 500 m
Pan American Games
Gold medal – first place	1987 Indianapolis	K-2 500m
Summer Universiade
Gold medal – first place	1987 Zagreb	K-1 500m

Terry "Olney" Kent III (born August 8, 1962) is an American sprint canoer who competed from the mid-1980s to the early 1990s. He won a silver medal in the K-2 500 m event at the 1990 ICF Canoe Sprint World Championships in Poznań.

Kent also competed in three Summer Olympics, earning his best finish of fourth in the K-2 1000 m event at Los Angeles in 1984.

A native of Lake Placid, New York, Kent served as a venue announcer at The Whistler Sliding Centre for the 2010 Winter Olympics in Vancouver in the bobsleigh, luge, and skeleton events. He had also served as a venue announcer for the 2002 Winter Olympics, 2004 Summer Olympics, and 2008 Summer Olympics.

Terry has two children, the eldest being Halle Kent (born July 18, 1994) and the youngest Cassandra Kent (born June 21, 1996).
