= Randall Dark =

American film producer

Randall P. Dark is a Canadian writer, director, and producer recognized as an early proponent of HDTV.

== Career ==
In 1995, Dark and his company, HD Vision, were involved with the United Nations 50th Anniversary where they shot, in HDTV, President Bill Clinton's speech in San Francisco. In 1999, Dark and HD Vision produced a documentary for PBS about the Albuquerque Balloon Festival. This program aired in HDTV in June 1999.

Much of Dark's work involves sweeping nature cinematography including Trinity River Raft Ride featuring Eddie Bracken. One of the 3D projects Dark directed in 2010 was 3 Cities in 3D, which was shot with the Panasonic 3D camera. The cities featured were Gatlinburg, Tennessee, Sevierville and Pigeon Forge, Tennessee. Randall also worked on HD projects with Julie Andrews, Willie Nelson, Harry Connick Jr., Lyle Lovett, Sting, Bill Clinton, Leonard Nimoy and Stephen Hawking

Dark was listed in the Studio Daily Top 50 Independent Category as a creative and technologist. He is also on the advisory board for the Caucus Foundation.
