= Kia Byers =

Canadian sprint kayaker (born 1987)

Personal information
- Born: October 6, 1987 (age 38) Regina, Saskatchewan, Canada

Sport
- Sport: Canoeing
Medal record
Representing Canada
World Championships
Bronze medal – third place	2009 Dartmouth	K-1 4 x 200 m
Pan American Games
Gold medal – first place	2007 Rio de Janeiro	K-2 500 m

Kia Byers (born October 6, 1987) is a Canadian sprint kayaker who has competed since 2000. She won a bronze medal in the K-1 4 x 200 m event at the 2009 ICF Canoe Sprint World Championships in Dartmouth.

Byers also won a gold medal at the 2007 Pan American Games in the women's K-2 500 m event, alongside Marie-Christine Schmidt.

Kia has been a carded member of the Canadian National team since 2006 competing at the World Championships since 2009. She has been number one in the K-1 200m event since 2009, racing it at each World Championships since.
