= Fernando Chaparro =

Argentine canoeist

Medal record
Representing Argentina
Pan American Games
Bronze medal – third place	1987 Indianapolis	K-4 1000m

Fernando Chaparro (born July 30, 1964) is an Argentine sprint canoer who competed in the late 1980s. He was eliminated in the repechages of the K-4 1000 m event at the 1988 Summer Olympics in Seoul. Four years later in Barcelona, Chaparro was eliminated in the repechages of the K-2 500 m event and the semifinals of the K-4 1000 m event.
