= Michael Harbold =

American sprint kayaker

Personal information
- Full name: Michael Everett Harbold
- Born: May 22, 1968 (age 58) Honolulu, Hawaii, U.S.
Medal record
Men's canoe sprint
Representing the United States
Pan American Games
Gold medal – first place	1987 Indianapolis	K-4 1000m
Silver medal – second place	1995 Mar del Plata	K-4 500m
Silver medal – second place	1995 Mar del Plata	K-4 1000m

Michael Everett Harbold (born May 22, 1968) is an American sprint kayaker who competed from the late 1980s to the mid-1990s. Competing in three Summer Olympics, he earned his best finish of eighth in the K-2 500 m event at Barcelona in 1992.
