= Angel Pérez (canoeist) =

Cuban-born American Sprint Kayaker (born 1971)

Personal information
- Born: February 2, 1971 (age 55) Havana, Cuba

Sport
- Sport: Canoeing
Medal record
Representing Cuba
Pan American Games
Gold medal – first place	1991 Havana	K-1 500m
Gold medal – first place	1991 Havana	K-2 500m
Gold medal – first place	1991 Havana	K-4 500m
Gold medal – first place	1991 Havana	K-4 1000m
Silver medal – second place	1991 Havana	K-1 1000m
Central American and Caribbean Games
Gold medal – first place	1990 Mexico City	K-1 500m
Gold medal – first place	1990 Mexico City	K-1 1000m
Gold medal – first place	1990 Mexico City	K-2 1000m
Gold medal – first place	1990 Mexico City	K-4 10,000m

Ángel Pérez Medina (born February 2, 1971, in Havana) is a Cuban-born American sprint kayaker who competed from the early 1990s to the mid-2000s.

In 1991, he won 4 golds and 1 silver in kayak sprint in Havana, Cuba. At the 1992 Summer Olympics in Barcelona, Spain, for Cuba, he was a semifinalist of both the K-1 500 m and the K-2 1000 m events.

In 1993 he and two other Cuban athletes sneaked away from an altitude training center in Mexico City, and sought asylum in Miami. In 1996, while already a resident of the US and being a qualified Olympic US Canoe and Kayak Team member, he was not able to participate in the 1996 Olympic Games because he was not yet a US citizen.

Four years later at the 2000 Summer Olympics in Sydney, Australia, for the United States, US citizen Pérez finished sixth in both the K-2 500 m and the K-4 1000 m events. Angel Perez was able to compete in Sydney, Australia despite a legal battle in the Olympic Court of Arbitrations, as Cuba fought in International Courts not to allow his former athlete to compete for the USA. A few hours before the start of the Sydney Games, Perez was legally allowed to compete.

In 2004 he retired to pursue other careers. Angel Perez, a Certified General Contractor, currently resides with his wife, Mari, and two children, Andres Roberto (b. 1996) and Marcos Alejandro (b. 2009)in Miami, Florida.
