= Ladymar Hernández =

Venezuelan sprint canoer

Sport
- Country: Venezuela
- Sport: Canoe sprint
Medal record
Canoe sprint
Pan American Games
Silver medal – second place	2007 Rio de Janeiro	K-4 500m

Ladymar Hernández is a Venezuelan sprint canoe kayaker. Hernández appeared in the canoeing competition at the 2007 Pan American Games, competing in a four-person kayak boat as part of the Venezuelan team with Zulmarys Sánchez, Eliana Escalona and Vanessa Silva. The boat won the silver medal over 500 m.
