= Canoeing at the Pan American Games =

- No. of events: 18 (men: 9; women: 9)

Canoeing first appeared at the Pan American Games at the 1987 edition. For the first time ever at the 2015 Pan American Games, canoe slalom, the only Olympic discipline to never have been held at the Games, will be making its debut, meaning for the first time ever the entire Olympic sports program will be contested. Furthermore, both canoe disciplines will have C-1 events for women for the first time ever.

== All-time medal table ==
=== Sprint canoeing ===
Men's and women's events (1987–2023)

Updated after the 2023 Pan American Games.

| Rank | Nation | Gold | Silver | Bronze | Total |
|---|---|---|---|---|---|
| 1 | Cuba | 40 | 25 | 17 | 82 |
| 2 | Canada | 29 | 33 | 25 | 87 |
| 3 | United States | 23 | 14 | 15 | 52 |
| 4 | Argentina | 14 | 17 | 23 | 54 |
| 5 | Mexico | 9 | 10 | 17 | 36 |
| 6 | Brazil | 5 | 14 | 17 | 36 |
| 7 | Ecuador | 1 | 2 | 1 | 4 |
| 8 | Chile | 0 | 5 | 1 | 6 |
| 9 | Venezuela | 0 | 1 | 4 | 5 |
| 10 | Colombia | 0 | 0 | 1 | 1 |
| 10 | Uruguay | 0 | 0 | 1 | 1 |
| Totals (11 entries) | | 121 | 121 | 122 | 364 |

=== Slalom canoeing ===
Men's and women's events (2015–2023)

Updated after the 2023 Pan American Games.

| Rank | Nation | Gold | Silver | Bronze | Total |
|---|---|---|---|---|---|
| 1 | Brazil | 8 | 6 | 2 | 16 |
| 2 | United States | 8 | 3 | 3 | 14 |
| 3 | Canada | 1 | 5 | 6 | 12 |
| 4 | Argentina | 0 | 3 | 1 | 4 |
| 5 | Mexico | 0 | 0 | 2 | 2 |
| 5 | Paraguay | 0 | 0 | 2 | 2 |
| 7 | Peru | 0 | 0 | 1 | 1 |
| Totals (7 entries) | | 17 | 17 | 17 | 51 |

=== Combined total ===
Updated after the 2023 Pan American Games.

| Rank | Nation | Gold | Silver | Bronze | Total |
|---|---|---|---|---|---|
| 1 | Cuba | 40 | 25 | 17 | 82 |
| 2 | United States | 31 | 17 | 18 | 66 |
| 3 | Canada | 30 | 38 | 31 | 99 |
| 4 | Argentina | 14 | 20 | 24 | 58 |
| 5 | Brazil | 13 | 20 | 19 | 52 |
| 6 | Mexico | 9 | 10 | 19 | 38 |
| 7 | Ecuador | 1 | 2 | 1 | 4 |
| 8 | Chile | 0 | 5 | 1 | 6 |
| 9 | Venezuela | 0 | 1 | 4 | 5 |
| 10 | Paraguay | 0 | 0 | 2 | 2 |
| 11 | Colombia | 0 | 0 | 1 | 1 |
| 11 | Peru | 0 | 0 | 1 | 1 |
| 11 | Uruguay | 0 | 0 | 1 | 1 |
| Totals (13 entries) | | 138 | 138 | 139 | 415 |

== See also ==
- List of Pan American Games medalists in canoeing
