= Zulmarys Sánchez =

Venezuelan sprint canoer (born 1987)

Personal information
- Full name: Zulmarys Caroline Sánchez Mendoza
- Born: 24 April 1987 (age 39) El Tocuyo, Venezuela

Sport
- Country: Venezuela
- Sport: Canoe sprint
Medal record
Canoe sprint
Pan American Games
| Silver medal – second place | 2007 Rio de Janeiro | K-4 500m |
South American Games
| Bronze medal – third place | 2006 Buenos Aires | 200m kayak sprint |

Zulmarys Caroline Sánchez Mendoza (born 24 April 1987 in El Tocuyo) is a Venezuelan sprint canoe kayaker who competed in the 2000s and 2010s. She was the first woman to represent Venezuela in canoeing at the Olympic Games, which she did in 2008.

== Career ==
At the 2006 South American Games, Sánchez won a bronze medal in the 200 m kayak sprint.

Sánchez appeared in the canoeing competition at the 2007 Pan American Games, competing in a four-person kayak boat as part of the Venezuelan team with Eliana Escalona, Vanessa Silva and Ladymar Hernández. The boat won the silver medal over 500 m. Sánchez was also the Venezuelan representative in the single sprint over the same distance at the competition, placing fifth.

At the 2008 Summer Olympics in Beijing, Venezuela sent athletes to compete in the canoe events for the first time, with Sánchez the only woman included in the canoe delegation. She was also the only Latina woman competing in her category, the 500 m kayak sprint. She made it to the semi-finals, but was eliminated when she finished last in her group. There was criticism from some sectors of the Venezuelan public levelled at their athletes competing in Beijing; upon the delegation's return to Venezuela, Sánchez responded and was quoted by the government press service as saying that their critics were probably unaware of the life and choices of elite athletes and that, above all, the athletes "give everything for our family, for our country."

When the Bolivarian Games added a Beach Games tournament in 2012, Sánchez competed in the 200 m kayak sprint, placing second. In the same category at the 2015 Pan American Games, Sánchez took what Analítica called a "meritorious" fourth place. She continued to focus on the 200 m, in which she was entered when competing in the 2016 Pan American Sprint Qualifier, part of the selection for the 2016 Summer Olympics. At the qualifying event, she took the bronze medal with a good time, finishing 0.03 seconds behind Stefanie Perdomo in second place, but was not selected.

At the 2018 Central American and Caribbean Games, Sánchez returned to the 500 m kayak sprint, this time in a doubles boat with Angélica Jiménez. The pair finished the race in last place, crossing the line seven seconds behind the winners. Sánchez finished off the podium but still among the top finishers in the 200 m individual sprint.
