= Carlos Montalvo =

Cuban canoeist

Sport
- Sport: Canoeing
Medal record
Representing Cuba
Men's canoe sprint
World Championships
Bronze medal – third place	2009 Dartmouth	K-2 1000 m
Central American and Caribbean Games
Gold medal – first place	2006 Cartagena	K-4 1000 m
Pan American Games
Bronze medal – third place	2007 Rio de Janeiro	K-4 1000m

Carlos Montalvo García is a Cuban sprint canoer who has competed since the late first decade of the 21st century. He won a bronze medal in the K-2 1000 m event at the 2009 ICF Canoe Sprint World Championships in Dartmouth.
