= Jim Terrell =

American sprint canoer (born 1965)

Personal information
- Full name: James Ross Terrell
- Born: April 20, 1965 (age 61) Cincinnati, Ohio, U.S.
- Height: 5 ft 10 in (178 cm)
- Weight: 161 lb (73 kg)
Medal record
Men's Canoeing
Representing United States
Pan American Games
Gold medal – first place	1987 Indianapolis	C-1 500m
Gold medal – first place	1995 Mar del Plata	C-1 500m
Silver medal – second place	1987 Indianapolis	C-2 1000m
Bronze medal – third place	1999 Winnipeg	C-1 500m

James Ross Terrell (born April 20, 1965) is an American sprint canoer who competed from the late 1980s to the mid-1990s. He was eliminated in the semifinals of the C-1 500 m event at the 1988 Summer Olympics in Seoul. Four years later in Barcelona, Terrell was eliminated in the semifinals of the C-2 500 m event. At his third and final Summer Olympics in Atlanta, Terrell was eliminated in the semifinals of the C-1 500 m event.

In 1998, a town park in his hometown of Milford, Ohio was named after him.
