= Juan Labrin =

Argentine canoeist

Medal record
Representing Argentina
Pan American Games
Bronze medal – third place	1987 Indianapolis	K-4 1000m
Bronze medal – third place	1995 Mar del Plata	K-4 1000m

Juan Labrin (born November 24, 1956) is an Argentine sprint canoer. He competed in the early 1990s.

At the 1992 Summer Olympics in Barcelona, Labrin was eliminated in the repechages of the K-2 500 m event and the semifinals of the K-4 1000 m event.
