= José Luis Marello =

Argentine canoeist

Personal information
- Born: September 8, 1965
- Died: January 25, 1999 (aged 33) Las Grutas, Rio Negro, Argentina

Sport
- Sport: Canoeing
Medal record
Representing Argentina
Pan American Games
Silver medal – second place	1991 Havana	K-2 1000m
Bronze medal – third place	1987 Indianapolis	K-4 1000m
Bronze medal – third place	1991 Havana	K-2 500m

José Luis Marello Suso (September 8, 1965 – January 25, 1999) was an Argentine sprint canoer. He competed in the late 1980s and early 1990s. At the 1988 Summer Olympics in Seoul, Marello was eliminated in the repechages of both the K-2 500 m and K-4 1000 m events. Four years later in Barcelona, he was eliminated in the semifinals of the K-4 1000 m event.

Marello and his partner Gabriela Cassano died in a road traffic accident in Las Grutas by a drunk driver.
