= Ian Gaudet =

Canadian sprint kayaker

Personal information
- Born: August 18, 2003 (age 22) Halifax, Canada
- Home town: Dartmouth, Nova Scotia

Sport
- Sport: Kayaking
Medal record
Men's canoe sprint
Representing Canada
Pan American Games
Gold medal – first place	2023 Santiago	K2 500 m
ICF World Junior Championships
Bronze medal – third place	2021 Montemor-o-Velho	K1 500 m
ICF U23 Canoe Sprint World Championships
Bronze medal – third place	2024 Plovdiv	K1 500 m

Ian Gaudet (born August 18, 2003) is a Canadian male sprint kayaker. His home club is Banook Canoe Club on Lake Banook in Dartmouth, Nova Scotia.

Gaudet won gold together with Simon McTavish in the K2 500 m event at the 2023 Pan American Games in Santiago.

== Career ==
Gaudet began kayaking in the summer of 2015 at the age of 11, at Abenaki Aquatic Club. He transferred to his current club, Banook Canoe Club in 2016.

In 2018 he competed at the Olympic Hopes Regatta in Poznań, Poland at the age of 15, winning 3 medals (2 silver and 1 gold), which put him on the pathway to a summer Olympics hopeful.

Gaudet also raced for Canada at the 2019 Olympic Hopes Regatta in Bratislava, Slovakia winning a bronze medal in the K1 200m event.

At the 2021 ICF World Junior Championships he won bronze in the K1 500 m event, Canada's only men's kayak medal at the event.

Gaudet competed for Nova Scotia at the 2022 Canada Summer Games where he won two golds in the K2 500 m and 1,000 m events, while adding three silver in the K1 200m, K4 200 m and K4 500 m events.

He also competed at the 2022 ICF U23 World Championships in Szeged, Hungary and at the 2023 ICF U23 World Championships in Auronzo, Italy where he finished fifth in the K1 500 m and 11th in the K2 500 m.

At the 2023 Pan American Games, Gaudet and Simon McTavish won gold together in the K2 500 m event in Santiago.

In May 2024, Gaudet competed in his first ICF World Cup in Szeged, Hungary, placing 15th in K2 500m with partner Vincent Jourdenais.

In July 2024, Gaudet competed at the 2024 ICF U23 World Championships in Plovdiv, Bulgaria, where he won his first U23 medal, a bronze in K1 500m. Gaudet is the first Canadian men's kayak athlete to win a U23 men's kayak medal. Ian also placed 5th in K2 1000m with partner Jason Burkholder and 15th in K4 500m.

Gaudet is a 14 time Canadian Champion.

== Personal ==
He attends Saint Mary's University where he is working towards completing his Bachelor of Science degree in geology.
