= Gilberto Soriano =

Mexican canoeist (born 1945)

Personal information
- Born: May 13, 1945 (age 81)

Sport
- Sport: Canoeing
Medal record
Representing Mexico
Pan American Games
Silver medal – second place	2007 Rio de Janeiro	C-2 500m

Gilberto Soriano Ramirez (born May 13, 1945) is a Mexican sprint canoer who competed in the early 1970s. He was eliminated in the repechages of both the K-2 1000 m and K-4 1000 m events at the 1972 Summer Olympics in Munich.
