= Gustavo Cirillo =

Argentine canoeist (born 1961)

Medal record
Representing Argentina
Pan American Games
Bronze medal – third place	1987 Indianapolis	K-4 1000m

Gustavo Cirillo (born April 23, 1961) is an Argentine sprint canoer who competed in the late 1980s. At the 1988 Summer Olympics in Seoul, he was eliminated in the repechages of both the K-2 500 m and K-4 1000 m events.
