= Liam Jewell =

Canadian canoeist (born 1968)

Medal record
Representing Canada
Pan American Games
Bronze medal – third place	1987 Indianapolis	K-2 1000m

Liam Jewell (born March 19, 1968 in Toronto) is a Canadian sprint canoer who competed in the mid-1990s. He finished seventh in the K-4 1000 m event at the 1996 Summer Olympics in Atlanta.
