= Manuel Cortina =

Mexican canoeist (born 1983)

Personal information
- Born: 21 July 1983 (age 42) Tuxpan, Veracruz, Mexico

Sport
- Sport: Canoeing
Medal record
Men's canoe sprint
Representing Mexico
Pan American Games
| Gold medal – first place | 2007 Rio de Janeiro | K-1 500 m |
| Gold medal – first place | 2007 Rio de Janeiro | K-2 500 m |
| Gold medal – first place | 2007 Rio de Janeiro | K-2 1000 m |
| Bronze medal – third place | 2003 Santo Domingo | K-2 500 m |
Central American and Caribbean Games
| Gold medal – first place | 2002 San Salvador | K-1 500 m |
| Gold medal – first place | 2006 Cartagena | K-1 500 m |
| Gold medal – first place | 2020 Mayaguez | K-1 200 m |
| Gold medal – first place | 2010 Mayaguez | K-2 200 m |
| Silver medal – second place | 2002 San Salvador | K-2 500 m |
| Silver medal – second place | 2002 San Salvador | K-4 500 m |
| Silver medal – second place | 2006 Cartagena | K-2 500 m |
| Silver medal – second place | 2006 Cartagena | K-4 500 m |
| Silver medal – second place | 2010 Mayaguez | K-2 1000 m |
| Bronze medal – third place | 2006 Cartagena | K-2 1000 m |

Manuel Cortina Martínez (born July 21, 1983) is a Mexican canoeist. He participated in the 2007 Pan American Games and obtained three gold medals in canoe sprint.

Martínez also competed at the 2008 Summer Olympics in Beijing, but was eliminated in the semifinals of both the K-1 500 m and the K-1 1000 m events.
