= Anca Mateescu =

Mexican canoeist (born 1981)

Personal information
- Born: 1981 (age 44–45)

Sport
- Sport: Canoeing
Medal record
Women's canoe sprint
Representing Mexico
Pan American Games
Bronze medal – third place	2007 Rio de Janeiro	K-1 500 m

Anca Ionela Mateescu (born 1981) is a Mexican canoeist. She participated in the 2007 Pan American Games and earned a bronze medal for her country in the Women's K1 500m canoe sprint event.
