= Marlo Marcheco =

Cuban canoeist (born 1963)

Personal information
- Born: March 8, 1963 (age 63)

Sport
- Sport: Canoeing
Medal record
Representing Cuba
Pan American Games
Gold medal – first place	1991 Havana	K-2 1000m
Gold medal – first place	1991 Havana	K-4 500m
Gold medal – first place	1991 Havana	K-4 1000m
Silver medal – second place	1987 Indianapolis	K-2 500m
Silver medal – second place	1987 Indianapolis	K-2 1000m
Silver medal – second place	1987 Indianapolis	K-4 1000m
Central American and Caribbean Games
Gold medal – first place	1990 Mexico City	K-2 500m
Gold medal – first place	1990 Mexico City	K-2 10,000m
Gold medal – first place	1990 Mexico City	K-4 500m
Gold medal – first place	1993 Ponce	K-1 1000m
Gold medal – first place	1993 Ponce	K-2 500m
Gold medal – first place	1993 Ponce	K-2 1000m
Gold medal – first place	1993 Ponce	K-4 200m
Gold medal – first place	1993 Ponce	K-4 500m

Mario Mariano "Marlo" Marcheco Rodríguez (born March 8, 1963) is a Cuban sprint canoer who competed in the early 1990s. At the 1992 Summer Olympics in Barcelona, he was eliminated in the semifinals of the K-2 1000 m event. He has also won eight gold medals in two Central American and Caribbean Games (1990-1993).
