= Mike Herbert =

American canoeist (born 1960)

Personal information
- Born: September 30, 1960 (age 66) Belleville, Illinois, United States

Sport
- Sport: Canoeing
Medal record
Representing United States
World Championships
Silver medal – second place	1990 Poznań	K-1 500 m
Silver medal – second place	1990 Poznań	K-2 500 m
Bronze medal – third place	1989 Plovdiv	K-1 500 m
Pan American Games
Gold medal – first place	1987 Indianapolis	K-2 500m
Gold medal – first place	1987 Indianapolis	K-4 1000m
Gold medal – first place	1991 Havana	K-1 1000m
Silver medal – second place	1991 Havana	K-1 500m
Silver medal – second place	1995 Mar del Plata	K-4 500m
Silver medal – second place	1995 Mar del Plata	K-4 1000m

Michael Adam "Mike" Herbert (born September 30, 1960) is an American sprint canoer who competed from the late 1980s to the late 1990s. He won three medals at the ICF Canoe Sprint World Championships with two silvers (K-1 500 m and K-2 500 m: both 1990) and a bronze (K-1 500 m: 1989).

Herbert also competed in three Summer Olympics, earning his best finish of fourth in the K-1 500 m event at Seoul in 1988.
