= Jillian D'Alessio =

Canadian sprint kayaker

Personal information
- Born: April 5, 1985 (age 41) Middle Sackville, Nova Scotia, Canada

Sport
- Sport: Canoeing
Medal record
Representing Canada
Pan American Games
Gold medal – first place	2003 Santo Domingo	K-4 500 m
Gold medal – first place	2007 Rio de Janeiro	K-1 500 m
Bronze medal – third place	2003 Santo Domingo	K-1 500 m
Bronze medal – third place	2007 Rio de Janeiro	K-4 500 m

Jillian D'Alessio (born April 5, 1985) is a Canadian sprint kayaker. She was part of the Canadian women's K-4 500 m event who finished eighth at the 2004 Summer Olympics. Jillian also competed in the 2003 Pan American Games in the Dominican Republic where she won a gold medal in the K-4 500 m and a bronze medal in the K-1 500 m. At the 2007 Pan American Games in Rio de Janeiro, D'Alessio won a gold medal in the K-1 500 m and bronze in the K-4 500 m.

D'Alessio is a lawyer with McInnes Cooper in Halifax, Nova Scotia. Her practice focuses on insurance litigation, sport law, governance, safe sport, and dispute resolution. She leads the firm's Sport Law Group and advises sport organizations, boards, and insurers across Canada.

== Coaching ==
D'Alessio coached at Banook Canoe Club in Dartmouth, Nova Scotia for Peewee Boys and Girls in the Summer of 2012.
