= Roberto Maehler =

Brazilian canoeist (born 1985)

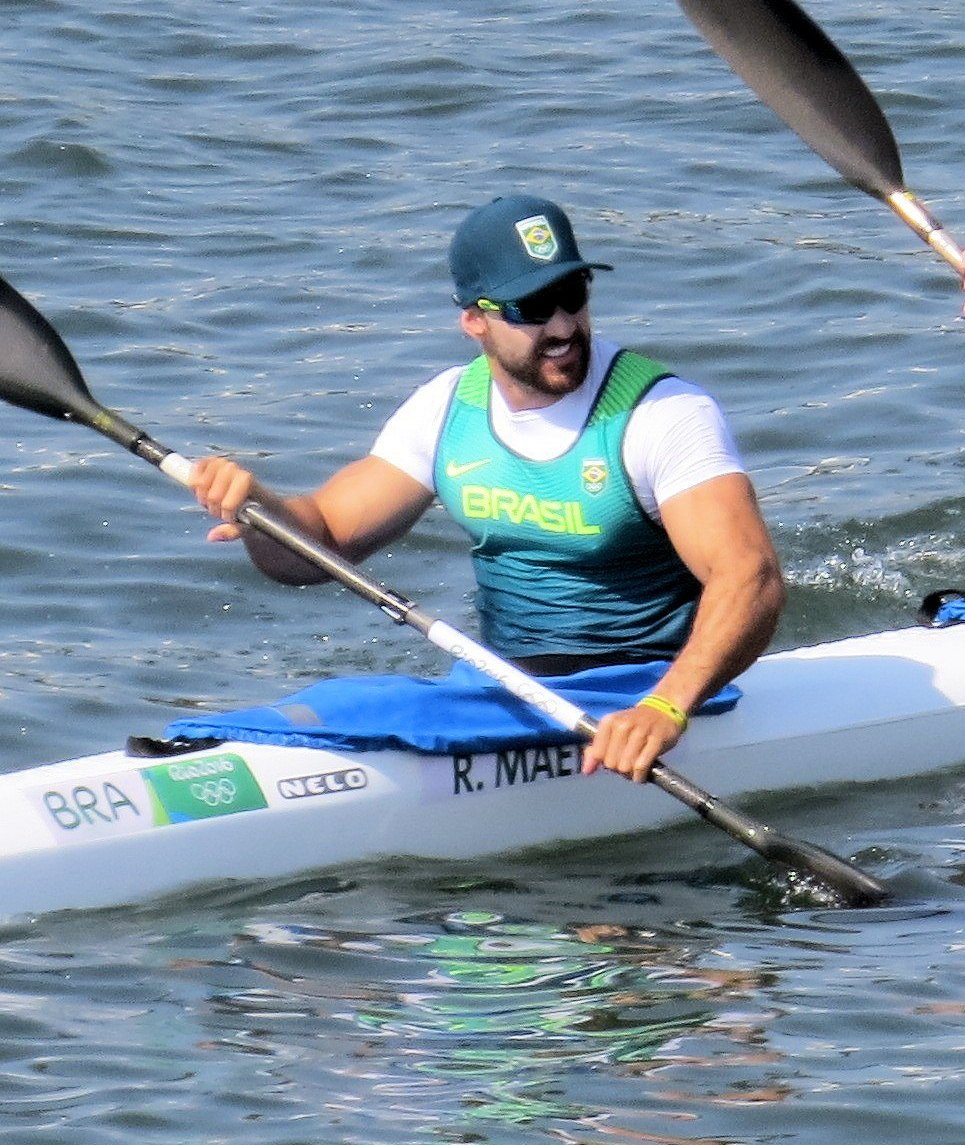
- Maehler at the 2016 Summer Olympics

Personal information
- Born: 25 January 1985 (age 41)

Sport
- Sport: Canoe sprint
Medal record
Men's sprint canoeing
Representing Brazil
Pan American Games
| Gold medal – first place | 2007 Rio de Janeiro | K-4 1000 m |
| Silver medal – second place | 2015 Toronto | K-4 1000 m |
| Bronze medal – third place | 2011 Guadalajara | K-4 1000 m |

Roberto Maehler (born 25 January 1985) is a Brazilian canoeist. He competed in the men's K-4 1000 metres event at the 2016 Summer Olympics.
