= Ian Mortimer (canoeist) =

Canadian canoeist (born 1983)

Personal information
- Born: 13 March 1983 (age 43)
Medal record
Men's Canoeing
Representing Canada
Pan American Games
Bronze medal – third place	2003 Santo Domingo	C-2 500 m

Ian Mortimer (born 13 March 1983) is a Canadian sprint canoer who has competed in the World Canoe Championships and trains with the sprint canoe national team of Canada. Mortimer is a member of the Rideau Canoe Club in Ottawa, Ontario, along with his brother Angus, who is also a national team member, but in kayaking.

Mortimer competed for Team Canada at the 2005 ICF Flatwater Racing World Championships, in Zagreb, Croatia, where his team finished fifth in the four-man 1000 meter event, four-tenths of a second from the bronze medal, and ninth in the four-man 500 meter event. He has also won a gold medal at the Canadian Junior Championship (two-man 500 meter), and won a World Cup event in Rezice during the 2004 season.

== See also ==
- List of canoe/kayak athletes by country
