= Everardo Cristóbal =

Mexican canoeist (born 1986)

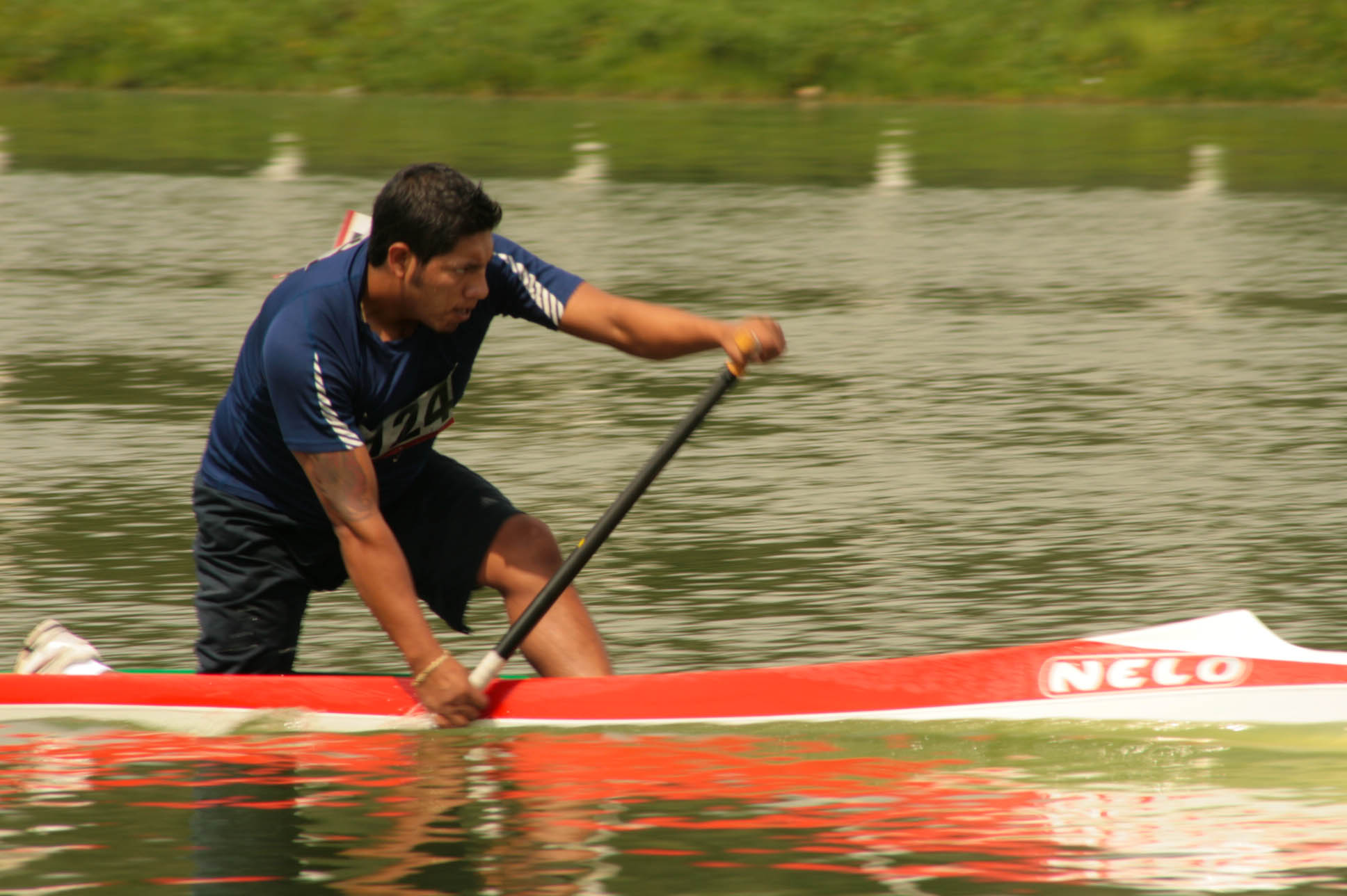

Personal information
- Born: 11 August 1986 (age 39) Urandén, Michoacán

Sport
- Sport: Canoe sprint
Medal record
Representing Mexico
World Championships
Gold medal – first place	2006 Szeged	C-1 1000 m
Pan American Games
Gold medal – first place	2007 Rio de Janeiro	C-1 500 m
Gold medal – first place	2007 Rio de Janeiro	C-1 1000 m
Gold medal – first place	2011 Guadalajara	C-1 1000 m
Bronze medal – third place	2015 Toronto	C-1 1000 m

José Everardo Cristóbal Quirino (born August 11, 1986) is a Mexican sprint canoeist who has been competing since 2005.

His first successful international performance was in 2006, when he won the gold medal in C-1 1000 m and the silver medal in C-1 500 m at the 2006 Central American and Caribbean Games. Later the same year, at the world championships, he surprisingly won the gold medal at C-1 1000 m, becoming the first Mexican to ever do this, defeating race favorite and Olympic medallist Andreas Dittmer, who finished second. For such performance he received the Premio Nacional del Deporte (National Sports Award), which is awarded annually by the Mexican Sports Committee (CONADE - in Spanish). In 2007, he won the gold medal both in C-1 500 m and C-1 1000 m at the 2007 Pan American Games.

Cristóbal competed at the 2008 Summer Olympics in Beijing in three events (C-1 1000 m, C-2 500 m, and C-2 1000 m), but was eliminated in the semifinal round in each event. His best finish was sixth in the C-1 1000 m semifinal. At the 2012 Summer Olympics, he competed in two events, the C-1 200 m and the C-1 1000 m, finishing in 20th and 10th positions, respectively.
