= Angus Mortimer =

Canadian canoeist

Personal information
- Born: September 4, 1985 (age 40) Ottawa, Ontario, Canada
Medal record
Men's canoe sprint
Pan American Games
Gold medal – first place	2007 Rio de Janeiro	K-1 1000m
Silver medal – second place	2007 Rio de Janeiro	K-1 500m
Silver medal – second place	2007 Rio de Janeiro	K-4 1000m

Angus Mortimer (born September 4, 1985) is a Canadian former sprint kayaker. He represented Canada at the 2008 Summer Olympics in Beijing, finishing ninth in the K-4 1000 m event. He won a gold medal in the 2007 Pan American Games K-1 1000m. He was banned from the sport after a 4-year investigation determined he engaged in grooming of children.

== Career ==
In 2005, Mortimer made his World Championship debut as a member of the K-4 that finished 14th over 500m. He won a gold medal in the 2007 Pan American Games K-1 1000m.

While attending Carleton University he paddled out of the Rideau Canoe Club. He represented Canada at the 2008 Summer Olympics in Beijing, finishing ninth in the K-4 1000 m event.

After failing to qualify for the 2012 Summer Olympics and 2016 Summer Olympics, Mortimer retired from paddling to spend more time with his family and coach.

A discipline panel determined that Angus Mortimer violated Canoe Kayak Canada's Discrimination and Harassment Policy for grooming teenage girls and coercing them into sexual acts from 2009 to 2013. Angus is permanently ineligible to participate in any capacity in any program, activity, event or competition sponsored by, organized by, or under the auspices of Canoe Kayak Canada and its members as of November 7, 2023.

== Personal life ==
His brother, Ian, is also a high-level paddler and Team Canada member in the canoe discipline.
