= Canoeing at the 2015 Pan American Games =

- Canoeing pictograms for the games
- Venues: Minden Wild Water Preserve (slalom); Welland Pan Am Flatwater Centre (sprint)
- Dates: July 11–19
- No. of events: 18 (11 men, 7 women)
- Competitors: 150 from 17 nations

Canoeing competitions at the 2015 Pan American Games surrounding Toronto were held in two disciplines: the sprint, from 11 to 14 July and the slalom, from 18 to 19 July. The slalom competition were held at the Minden Wild Water Preserve in Minden Hills. The sprint events were staged at the Welland Pan Am Flatwater Centre in Welland.

At the Pan American Sports Organization's 2013 general assembly in Jamaica, canoe slalom competitions were added to the program. This was the first time slalom was staged at the Pan American Games. Furthermore, women also competed in canoe races for the first time ever in both disciplines.

The winners of the five canoe slalom competitions (besides the C-1 women event, which is not an Olympic event) qualified for the 2016 Summer Olympics in Rio de Janeiro, Brazil. If Brazil, the host nation of the Olympics, won any events, the runner up qualified instead.

== Competition schedule ==
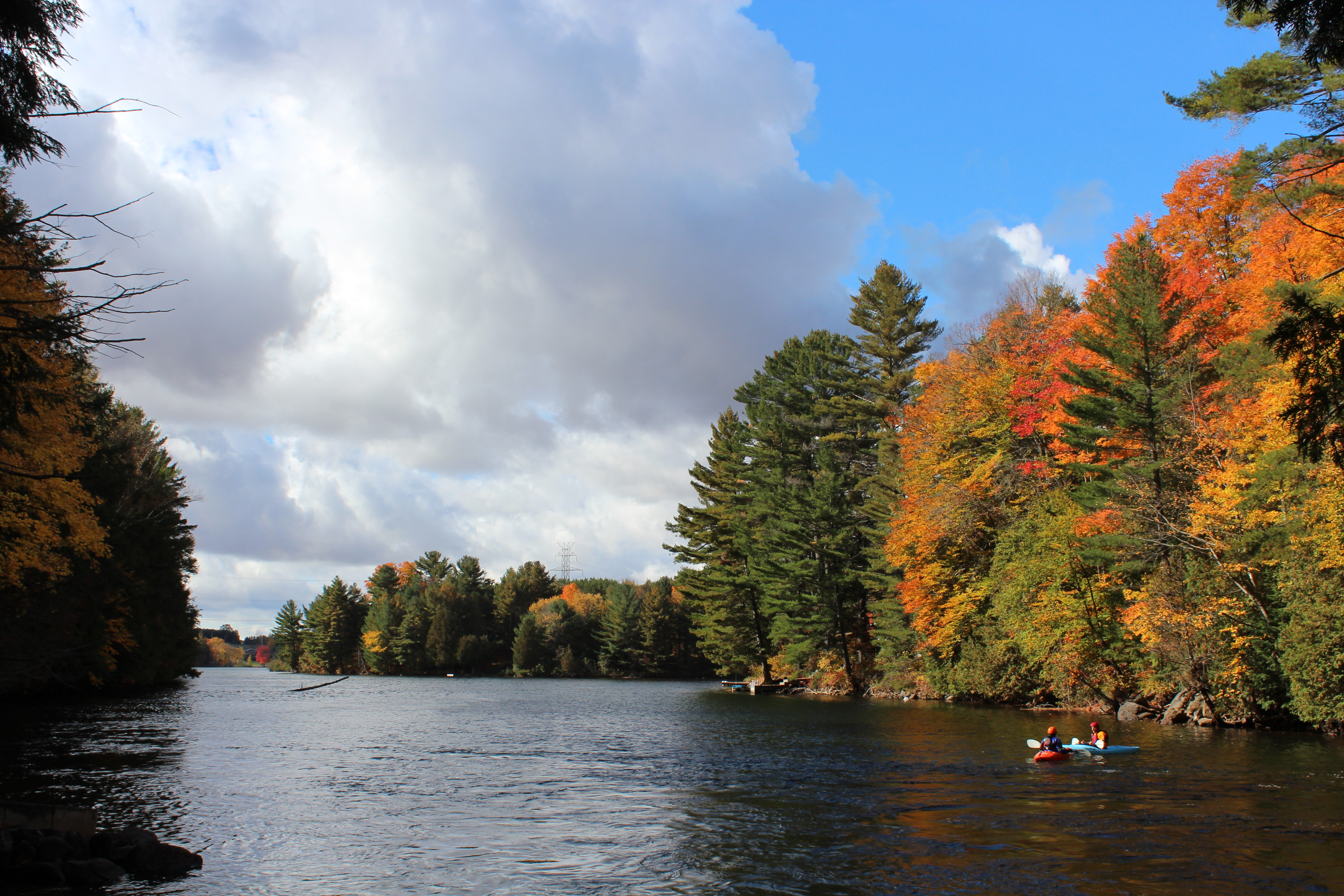
The Minden Wild Water Preserve, in Minden, is the venue for the slalom discipline.

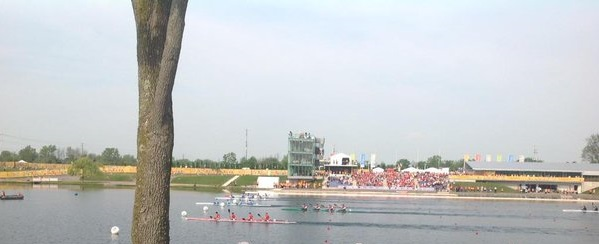
The Welland Pan Am Flatwater Centre, in Welland, was the venue for the sprint discipline.

The following is the competition schedule for the canoeing competitions:

H	Heats	½	Semifinals	F	Final

Slalom
Event↓/Date →	Sat 18	Sun 19	
Men's slalom C-1	H	½	F
Men's slalom C-2	H	½	F
Men's slalom K-1	H	½	F
Women's slalom C-1	H	½	F
Women's slalom K-1	H	½	F

Sprint
Event↓/Date →	Sat 11		Sun 12		Mon 13		Tue 14
Men's C-1 200 metres			H	½			F
Men's C-1 1000 metres	H	½			F		
Men's C-2 1000 metres	H	½			F		
Men's K-1 200 metres			H	½			F
Men's K-1 1000 metres	H	½			F		
Men's K-2 200 metres			H	½			F
Men's K-2 1000 metres	H	½			F		
Men's K-4 1000 metres			F				
Women's C-1 200 metres							F
Women's K-1 200 metres			H	½			F
Women's K-1 500 metres	H	½			F		
Women's K-2 500 metres					H	½	F
Women's K-4 500 metres	F						

== Medal table ==
* Host nation (Canada)

Rank	Nation	Gold	Silver	Bronze	Total
1	Cuba	6	2	2	10
2	Canada*	5	5	4	14
3	Brazil	3	6	5	14
4	United States	3	1	1	5
5	Argentina	1	3	4	8
6	Ecuador	0	1	1	2
7	Mexico	0	0	2	2
Totals (7 entries)		18	18	19	55

== Medalists ==
=== Slalom ===
Event	Gold	Silver	Bronze
Men's C-1	Casey Eichfeld; United States	Cameron Smedley; Canada	Felipe Borges; Brazil
Men's C-2	United States; Devin McEwan; Casey Eichfeld	Brazil; Charles Correa; Anderson Oliveira	Argentina; Lucas Rossi; Sebastián Rossi
Men's K-1	Michal Smolen; United States	Pedro Gonçalves; Brazil	Ben Hayward; Canada
Women's C-1	Ana Sátila; Brazil	Colleen Hickey; United States	Haley Daniels; Canada
Women's K-1	Jazmyne Denhollander; Canada	Ana Sátila; Brazil	Ashley Nee; United States

=== Sprint ===
Men

Event	Gold	Silver	Bronze
Men's C-1 200 m	Isaquias Queiroz; Brazil	Jason McCoombs; Canada	Arnold Rodriguez; Cuba
Men's C-1 1000 m	Isaquias Queiroz; Brazil	Mark Oldershaw; Canada	Everardo Cristóbal; Mexico
Men's C-2 1000 m	Canada; Benjamin Russell; Gabriel Beauchesne-Sévigny	Brazil; Erlon de Souza Silva; Isaquias Queiroz	Cuba; Serguey Torres; José Carlos Bulnes
Men's K-1 200 m	Mark de Jonge; Canada	Edson Silva; Brazil	César de Cesare; Ecuador
Men's K-1 1000 m	Jorge Garcia; Cuba	Daniel Dal Bo; Argentina	Adam van Koeverden; Canada
Men's K-2 200 m	Argentina; Ezequiel Di Giacomo; Rubén Rézola	Cuba; Fidel Vargas; Reinier Torres	Brazil; Hans Heinrich Mallmann; Edson Freitas da Silva
Men's K-2 200 m	Argentina; Ezequiel Di Giacomo; Rubén Rézola	Cuba; Fidel Vargas; Reinier Torres	Canada; Mark de Jonge; Pierre-Luc Poulin
Men's K-2 1000 m	Cuba; Jorge Garcia; Reinier Torres	Argentina; Pablo de Torres; Gonzalo Carreras	Brazil; Celso Dias de Oliveira Junior; Vagner Junior Souta
Men's K-4 1000 m	Cuba; Jorge Garcia; Renier Mora; Reinier Torres; Alex Menendez	Brazil; Roberto Maehler; Vagner Junior Souta; Celso Dias de Oliveira Junior; Gilvan Bitencourt Ribeiro	Argentina; Daniel Dal Bo; Juan Ignacio Caceres; Pablo de Torres; Gonzalo Carreras

Women

Event	Gold	Silver	Bronze
Women's C-1 200 m	Laurence Vincent Lapointe; Canada	Anggie Avegno; Ecuador	Valdenice Conceição; Brazil
Women's K-1 200 m	Yusmari Mengana; Cuba	Michelle Russell; Canada	Sabrina Ameghino; Argentina
Women's K-1 500 m	Yusmari Mengana; Cuba	Michelle Russell; Canada	Ana Paula Vergutz; Brazil
Women's K-2 500 m	Cuba; Yusmari Mengana; Yurieni Guerra	Argentina; Sabrina Ameghino; Alexandra Keresztesi	Mexico; Karina Alanís; Maricela Montemayor
Women's K-4 500 m	Canada; Émilie Fournel; Kathleen Fraser; Michelle Russell; Hannah Vaughan	Cuba; Daniela Martin; Yurieni Guerra; Lisandra Torres; Jessica Hernandez	Argentina; Maria Magdalena Garro; Sabrina Ameghino; Alexandra Keresztesi; Brenda Rojas

== Participating nations ==
A total of 17 countries have qualified athletes. The number of athletes a nation has entered is in parentheses beside the name of the country.

- Argentina (17)
- Brazil (19)
- Canada (19)
- Chile (10)
- Colombia (8)
- Costa Rica (2)
- Cuba (15)
- Dominican Republic (1)
- Ecuador (5)
- Guatemala (1)
- Mexico (16)
- Paraguay (1)
- Peru (1)
- Puerto Rico (2)
- United States (11)
- Uruguay (6)
- Venezuela (16)

== Qualification ==
A quota of 160 canoers (40 slalom and 120 sprint) were allowed to qualify. A maximum of fifteen athletes can compete for a nation in sprint, while a maximum of six can compete in slalom.

== See also ==
- Canoeing at the 2016 Summer Olympics
