= Canoeing at the 2019 Pan American Games – Men's K-4 500 metres =

Men's K-4 500 metres at the 2019 Pan American Games
- Venue: Albufera Medio Mundo
- Dates: 28 July
- Competitors: 28 from 7 nations
- Winning time: 1:22.106

Medalists
Gold medal	Manuel Lascano; Juan Caceres; Ezequiel Di Giacomo; Gonzalo Carreras	Argentina
Silver medal	Reinier Carrera; Renier Mora; Robert Benítez; Fidel Vargas	Cuba
Bronze medal	Javier Lopez; Juan Rodriguez; Mauricio Figueroa; Osbaldo Fuentes	Mexico

The men's K-4 500 metres kayaking event at the 2019 Pan American Games was held on 28 July at the Albufera Medio Mundo in the city of Huacho.

== Results ==
=== Final ===
Rank	Athletes	Country	Time
1st place, gold medalist(s)	Manuel Lascano; Juan Caceres; Ezequiel Di Giacomo; Gonzalo Carreras	Argentina	1:22.106
2nd place, silver medalist(s)	Reinier Carrera; Renier Mora; Robert Benítez; Fidel Vargas	Cuba	1:23.039
3rd place, bronze medalist(s)	Javier Lopez; Juan Rodriguez; Mauricio Figueroa; Osbaldo Fuentes	Mexico	1:23.106
4	Jarret Kenke; Eric Ellery; Dominik Crête; Marshall Hughes	Canada	1:23.871
5	Stanton Collins; Nathaniel Errez; Carl Crockett; Owen Farleyklacik	United States	1:25.011
6	Patrick Faustino; Edson Silva; Vagner Souta; Pedro Costa	Brazil	1:25.436
7	Sebastian Delgado; Matias Otero; Julian Cabrera; Jose Lopez	Uruguay	1:25.901
