= Canoeing at the 2010 South American Games – Men's K-4 1000 metres =

The Men's K-4 1000m event at the 2010 South American Games was held over March 27 at 11:20.

== Medalists ==
Gold	Silver	Bronze
Juan Pablo Bergero; Daniel Alfredo dal Bo; Pablo de Torres; Nelson Roberto Sallette; Argentina	Celso Oliveira; Roberto Maheler; Givago Ribeiro; Edson Silva; Brazil	Jesús Andrés Colmenzarez; Marcos Javier Pérez; Giovanny Ramos; Gabriel Rodríguez; Venezuela

== Results ==
Rank	Athlete	Time
1st place, gold medalist(s)	Argentina; Juan Pablo Bergero; Daniel Alfredo dal Bo; Pablo de Torres; Nelson Roberto Sallette	3:00.34
2nd place, silver medalist(s)	Brazil; Celso Oliveira; Roberto Maheler; Givago Ribeiro; Edson Silva	3:02.62
3rd place, bronze medalist(s)	Venezuela; Jesús Andrés Colmenzarez; Marcos Javier Pérez; Giovanny Ramos; Gabriel Rodríguez	3:05.65
4	Colombia; Edwin Serna; José Miller Acosta; Leocadio Pinto; Jimmy Urrego	3:11.61
5	Uruguay; Gonzalo Calandria; Marcelo D'Ambrosio; Martín Pérez; José Matías Silva	3:22.98
