= Canoeing at the 2010 South American Games – Men's K-2 500 metres =

The Men's K-2 500m event at the 2010 South American Games was held over March 28 at 10:40.

== Medalists ==
Gold	Silver	Bronze
Givago Ribeiro; Edson Silva; Brazil	Juan Pablo de Gesús; Pablo de Torres; Argentina	Giovanny Ramos; Gabriel Rodríguez; Venezuela

== Results ==
Rank	Athlete	Time
1st place, gold medalist(s)	Brazil; Givago Ribeiro; Edson Silva	1:37.07
2nd place, silver medalist(s)	Argentina; Juan Pablo de Gesús; Pablo de Torres	1:37.40
3rd place, bronze medalist(s)	Venezuela; Giovanny Ramos; Gabriel Rodríguez	1:40.35
4	Chile; Cristian Gonzalo Fierro; Cristian Rodrigo Núñez	1:46.93
5	Uruguay; Gonzalo Calandria; José Matías Silva	1:47.35
6	Colombia; Raúl Giraldo; Yojan Cano	1:48.52
7	Ecuador; Christian Albert Oyarzun; Paul Andrés Vinces	1:57.93
8	Bolivia; Juan Carlos Estrada; Sandro Cuevas	2:05.32
