= Canoeing at the 2015 Pan American Games – Men's K-2 1000 metres =

Men's K-2 1000 metres at the 2015 Pan American Games
- Venue: Welland Pan Am Flatwater Centre
- Dates: July 13
- Competitors: 14 from 7 nations
- Winning time: 3:25.932

Medalists
Gold medal	Jorge García; Reinier Torres	Cuba
Silver medal	Pablo de Torres; Gonzalo Carreras	Argentina
Bronze medal	Celso Dias De Oliveira Junior; Vagner Junior Souta	Brazil

The men's K-2 1000 metres canoeing event at the 2015 Pan American Games will be held between the 11 and 13 of July at the Welland Pan Am Flatwater Centre in Welland.

== Schedule ==
The following is the competition schedule for the event:

All times are Eastern Daylight Time (UTC−4)

Date	Time	Round
July 13, 2015	10:55	Final

== Results ==
=== Final ===
Rank	Athletes	Country	Time	Notes
1st place, gold medalist(s)	Jorge García; Reinier Torres	Cuba	3:25.932	
2nd place, silver medalist(s)	Pablo de Torres; Gonzalo Carreras	Argentina	3:27.240	
3rd place, bronze medalist(s)	Celso Dias De Oliveira Junior; Vagner Junior Souta	Brazil	3:30.104	
4	Javier López; Jesus Valdez	Mexico	3:30.560	
5	Brady Reardon; Andrew Jessop	Canada	3:30.726	
6	Julian Cabrera; Matias Otero	Uruguay	3:34.066	
7	Christopher Miller; Stanton Collins	United States	3:35.599	
