= Canoeing at the 2010 South American Games – Men's K-4 200 metres =

The Men's K-4 200m event at the 2010 South American Games was held over March 29 at 11:20.

== Medalists ==
Gold	Silver	Bronze
Celso Oliveira; Roberto Maheler; Gilvan Ribeiro; Edson Silva; Brazil	Juan Pablo Bergero; Joaquín Siriscevic; Rubén Resola; Daniel Alfredo dal Bo; Argentina	Jesús Andrés Colmenzarez; Marcos Javier Pérez; Giovanny Ramos; Gabriel Rodríguez; Venezuela

== Results ==
Rank	Athlete	Time
1st place, gold medalist(s)	Brazil; Celso Oliveira; Roberto Maheler; Gilvan Ribeiro; Edson Silva	31.46
2nd place, silver medalist(s)	Argentina; Juan Pablo Bergero; Joaquín Siriscevic; Rubén Resola; Daniel Alfredo dal Bo	31.86
3rd place, bronze medalist(s)	Venezuela; Jesús Andrés Colmenzarez; Marcos Javier Pérez; Giovanny Ramos; Gabriel Rodríguez	32.34
4	Colombia; Edwin Serna; Raúl Giraldo; José Miller Acosta; Jimmy Urrego	33.93
5	Uruguay; Gonzalo Calandria; Marcelo D'Ambrosio; Martín Pérez; José Matías Silva	34.52
