= Canoeing at the 2010 South American Games – Men's K-2 1000 metres =

The Men's K-2 1000m event at the 2010 South American Games was held over March 27 at 10:40.

== Medalists ==
Gold	Silver	Bronze
Michel Ferreira; Gilvan Ribeiro; Brazil	Jesus Andres Colmenarez; Marcos Javier Perez; Venezuela	Fernando Lohengrin Aguayo; Cristian Rodrigo Nunez; Chile

== Results ==
Rank	Athlete	Time
1st place, gold medalist(s)	Brazil; Michel Ferreira; Gilvan Ribeiro	3:23.40
2nd place, silver medalist(s)	Venezuela; Jesus Andres Colmenarez; Marcos Javier Perez	3:26.20
3rd place, bronze medalist(s)	Chile; Fernando Lohengrin Aguayo; Cristian Rodrigo Nunez	3:31.18
4	Colombia; Edwin Serna; Raúl Giraldo	3:34.09
5	Ecuador; Christian Albert Oyarzun; Paul Andres Vinces	3:45.70
6	Uruguay; Martin Perez; Jose Matias Silva	3:46.20
7	Bolivia; Juan Carlos Estrada; Sandro Cuevas	4:11.25
	Argentina; Juan Pablo Bergero; Pablo de Torres	DSQ
