= Canoeing at the 2015 Pan American Games – Men's K-1 200 metres =

Men's K-1 200 metres at the 2015 Pan American Games
- Venue: Welland Pan Am Flatwater Centre
- Dates: July 12–14
- Competitors: 11 from 11 nations
- Winning time: 35.733

Medalists
| Gold medal | Mark de Jonge | Canada |
| Silver medal | Edson Isaias Freitas Da Silva | Brazil |
| Bronze medal | César de Cesare | Ecuador |

The men's K-1 200 metres canoeing event at the 2015 Pan American Games will be held between the 12 and 14 of July at the Welland Pan Am Flatwater Centre in Welland.

== Schedule ==
The following is the competition schedule for the event:

All times are Eastern Daylight Time (UTC−4)

| Date | Time | Round |
|---|---|---|
| July 12, 2015 | 10:05 | Heat 1 |
| July 12, 2015 | 10:12 | Heat 2 |
| July 12, 2015 | 11:31 | Semi-finals |
| July 14, 2015 | 9:25 | Finals |

== Results ==
=== Heats ===
Qualification Rules: 1..3->Final, 4..7 and 8th best time->Semifinals, Rest Out

==== Heat 1 ====
| Rank | Athletes | Country | Time | Notes |
|---|---|---|---|---|
| 1 | Ruben Voisard Rezola | Argentina | 36.289 | F |
| 2 | Fidel Vargas | Cuba | 36.401 | F |
| 3 | Edson Isaias Freitas Da Silva | Brazil | 36.685 | F |
| 4 | Timothy Hornsby | United States | 37.740 | SF |
| 5 | Sebastian Romero | Uruguay | 39.109 | SF |
| 6 | Yojan Cano | Colombia | 41.882 | SF |

==== Heat 2 ====
| Rank | Athletes | Country | Time | Notes |
|---|---|---|---|---|
| 1 | Mark de Jonge | Canada | 35.681 | F |
| 2 | César de Cesare | Ecuador | 36.378 | F |
| 3 | Antonio Oropeza Suarez | Venezuela | 37.454 | F |
| 4 | Jordan Salazar | Mexico | 37.490 | SF |
| 5 | Edvin Buc Solorzano | Guatemala | 42.057 | SF |

=== Semifinal ===
Qualification Rules: 1..3->Final, Rest Out

| Rank | Athletes | Country | Time | Notes |
|---|---|---|---|---|
| 1 | Timothy Hornsby | United States | 38.519 | F |
| 2 | Sebastian Romero | Uruguay | 39.542 | F |
| 3 | Jordan Salazar | Mexico | 39.761 | F |
| 4 | Yojan Cano | Colombia | 43.837 | |
| 5 | Edvin Buc Solorzano | Guatemala | 45.752 | |

=== Final ===
| Rank | Athletes | Country | Time | Notes |
|---|---|---|---|---|
| 1st place, gold medalist(s) | Mark de Jonge | Canada | 35.733 | |
| 2nd place, silver medalist(s) | Edson Isaias Freitas Da Silva | Brazil | 36.239 | |
| 3rd place, bronze medalist(s) | César de Cesare | Ecuador | 36.431 | |
| 4 | Ruben Voisard Rezola | Argentina | 36.674 | |
| 5 | Fidel Vargas | Cuba | 37.103 | |
| 6 | Timothy Hornsby | United States | 37.356 | |
| 7 | Jordan Salazar | Mexico | 38.203 | |
| 8 | Sebastian Romero | Uruguay | 38.369 | |
| 9 | Antonio Oropeza Suarez | Venezuela | 41.591 | |
