= Canoeing at the 2015 Pan American Games – Men's K-4 1000 metres =

Men's K-4 1000 metres at the 2015 Pan American Games
- Venue: Welland Pan Am Flatwater Centre
- Dates: July 12
- Competitors: 32 from 8 nations
- Winning time: 3:01.744

Medalists
Gold medal	Jorge Garcia; Renier Mora; Reinier Torres; Alex Menendez	Cuba
Silver medal	Roberto Maehler; Vagner Junior Souta; Celso Dias De Oliveira Junior; Gilvan Bitencourt Ribeiro	Brazil
Bronze medal	Daniel dal Bo; Juan Ignacio Caceres; Pablo de Torres; Gonzalo Carreras	Argentina

The men's K-4 1000 metres canoeing event at the 2015 Pan American Games was held on July 12 at the Welland Pan Am Flatwater Centre in Welland. The defending Pan American Games champions are Osvaldo Labrada, Reinier Torres, Jorge García and Maikel Zulueta of Cuba.

== Qualification ==
The top five boats including the host nation of Canada at the 2014 Pan American Championships in Mexico City, Mexico qualified to compete at the games. All other countries that competed qualified through the reallocation process.

== Schedule ==
The following is the competition schedule for the event:

All times are Eastern Daylight Time (UTC−4)

Date	Time	Round
Sunday 12 July	9:05	Final

== Results ==
=== Final ===
Rank	Rowers	Country	Time	Notes
1st place, gold medalist(s)	Jorge Garcia; Renier Mora; Reinier Torres; Alex Menendez	Cuba	3:01.744	
2nd place, silver medalist(s)	Roberto Maehler; Vagner Junior Souta; Celso Dias De Oliveira Junior; Gilvan Bitencourt Ribeiro	Brazil	3:01.869	
3rd place, bronze medalist(s)	Daniel dal Bo; Juan Ignacio Caceres; Pablo de Torres; Gonzalo Carreras	Argentina	3:02.079	
4	Brady Reardon; Andrew Jessop; Pierre-Luc Poulin; Phil Duchesneau	Canada	3:03.482	
5	Javier Lopez; Jordan Salazar; Jesus Valdez; Osbaldo Fuentes	Mexico	3:05.046	
6	Julian Cabrera; Matias Otero; Sebastian Delgado; Sebastian Romero	Uruguay	3:11.176	
7	Ray Acuna Sanchez; Cristian Canache Cabeza; Juan Montoya Flores; Jesus Colmeneras Lizardo	Venezuela	3:13.484	
8	Jean Neira; Rene Susperreguy; Manuel Chacano; Fernando Nicolas	Chile	3:17.865	
