= Canoeing at the 2010 South American Games – Men's K-1 200 metres =

Event at the 2010 South American Games

The Men's K-1 200m event at the 2010 South American Games was held over March 29 at 9:40.

== Medalists ==
| Gold | Silver | Bronze |
|---|---|---|
| Edson Silva; Brazil | Jhonson Jose Vergara; Venezuela | Ruben Resola; Argentina |

== Results ==
| Rank | Athlete | Time |
|---|---|---|
| 1st place, gold medalist(s) | Edson Silva (BRA) | 37.56 |
| 2nd place, silver medalist(s) | Jhonson Jose Vergara (VEN) | 38.01 |
| 3rd place, bronze medalist(s) | Ruben Resola (ARG) | 38.63 |
| 4 | Marcelo D'Ambrosio (URU) | 39.03 |
| 5 | Christian Albert Oyarzun (ECU) | 40.25 |
| 6 | Jimmy Urrego (COL) | 41.58 |
| 7 | Juan Carlos Estrada (BOL) | 48.16 |
