= Canoeing at the 2010 South American Games – Men's K-4 500 metres =

The Men's K-4 500m event at the 2010 South American Games was held over March 29 at 11:20.

== Medalists ==
Gold	Silver	Bronze
Juan Pablo Bergero; Joaquín Siriscevic; Rubén Resola; Daniel Alfredo dal Bo; Argentina	Celso Oliveira; Roberto Maheler; Givago Ribeiro; Edson Silva; Brazil	Jesús Andrés Colmenzarez; Marcos Javier Pérez; Giovanny Ramos; Gabriel Rodríguez; Venezuela

== Results ==
Rank	Athlete	Time
1st place, gold medalist(s)	Argentina; Juan Pablo Bergero; Joaquín Siriscevic; Rubén Resola; Daniel Alfredo dal Bo	1:28.80
2nd place, silver medalist(s)	Brazil; Celso Oliveira; Roberto Maheler; Givago Ribeiro; Edson Silva	1:29.78
3rd place, bronze medalist(s)	Venezuela; Jesús Andrés Colmenzarez; Marcos Javier Pérez; Giovanny Ramos; Gabriel Rodríguez	1:29.97
4	Colombia; Edwin Serna; José Miller Acosta; Leocadio Pinto; Jimmy Urrego	1:35.41
5	Uruguay; Gonzalo Calandria; Marcelo D'Ambrosio; Martín Pérez; José Matías Silva	1:39.78
