= Canoeing at the 2010 South American Games – Men's K-2 200 metres =

The Men's K-2 200m event at the 2010 South American Games was held over March 29 at 10:40.

== Medalists ==
Gold	Silver	Bronze
Ricardo Barreto; Roberto Maheler; Brazil	Joaquín Siriscevic; Rubén Resola; Argentina	Giovanny Ramos; Gabriel Rodríguez; Venezuela

== Results ==
Rank	Athlete	Time
1st place, gold medalist(s)	Brazil; Ricardo Barreto; Roberto Maheler	33.67
2nd place, silver medalist(s)	Argentina; Joaquín Siriscevic; Rubén Resola	34.91
3rd place, bronze medalist(s)	Venezuela; Giovanny Ramos; Gabriel Rodríguez	35.62
4	Colombia; Raúl Giraldo; Jimmy Urrego	36.67
5	Uruguay; Marcelo D'Ambrosio; Martín Pérez	37.91
6	Chile; Fernando Lohengrin Aguayo; Cristian Rodrigo Núñez	38.94
7	Ecuador; Christian Albert Oyarzun; Paul Andrés Vinces	39.42
8	Bolivia; Juan Carlos Estrada; Sandro Cuevas	46.89
