= Canoeing at the 2015 Pan American Games – Men's K-2 200 metres =

Men's K-2 200 metres at the 2015 Pan American Games
- Venue: Welland Pan Am Flatwater Centre
- Dates: July 14
- Competitors: 14 from 7 nations
- Winning time: 33.955

Medalists
Gold medal	Ezequiel Di Giácomo; Rubén Rézola	Argentina
Silver medal	Fidel Vargas; Reinier Torres	Cuba
Bronze medal	Mark de Jonge; Pierre-Luc Poulin	Canada
Bronze medal	Hans Heinrich Mallmann; Edson Isaias Freitas Da Silva	Brazil

The men's K-2 200 metres canoeing event at the 2015 Pan American Games was held between the 12 and 14 of July at the Welland Pan Am Flatwater Centre in Welland.

== Schedule ==
The following is the competition schedule for the event:

All times are Eastern Daylight Time (UTC−4)

Date	Time	Round
July 14, 2015	10:55	Final

== Results ==
=== Final ===
Rank	Athletes	Country	Time	Notes
1st place, gold medalist(s)	Ezequiel Di Giácomo; Rubén Rézola	Argentina	33.955	
2nd place, silver medalist(s)	Fidel Vargas; Reinier Torres	Cuba	34.139	
3rd place, bronze medalist(s)	Mark de Jonge; Pierre-Luc Poulin	Canada	34.345	
3rd place, bronze medalist(s)	Hans Heinrich Mallmann; Edson Isaias Freitas Da Silva	Brazil	34.345	
5	José Giovanni Ramos; Antonio Oropeza Suarez	Venezuela	34.864	
6	Jordan Salazar; Osbaldo Fuentes	Mexico	37.072	
7	Mauro de Sosa; Edgardo Brum	Uruguay	39.276	
