= Canoeing at the 2012 Summer Olympics – Men's K-1 1000 metres =

Men's canoe sprint K-1 1,000 metres at the Games of the XXX Olympiad
- Venue: Eton Dorney
- Date: 6 to 8 August
- Competitors: 22 from 22 nations
- Winning time: 3:26.462

Medalists
1st place, gold medalist(s)		Eirik Verås Larsen	Norway
2nd place, silver medalist(s)		Adam van Koeverden	Canada
3rd place, bronze medalist(s)		Max Hoff	Germany

The men's canoe sprint K-1 1,000 metres at the 2012 Olympic Games in London took place between 6 and 8 August at Eton Dorney.

== Competition format ==
The competition comprised heats, semifinals, and a final round. The top five boats from each heat, and the fastest loser, advanced to the semifinals. The top four boats in each semifinal advanced to the "A" final, and competed for medals. A placing "B" final was held for the other semifinalists.

== Schedule ==
All times are British Summer Time (UTC+01:00)

Date	Time	Round
Monday 6 August 2012	09:30; 10:58	Heats; Semifinals
Wednesday 8 August 2012	09:30	Finals

== Results ==
=== Heats ===
The first five and the best 6th placed canoeists qualified for the semifinals.

==== Heat 1 ====
Rank	Canoer	Country	Time	Notes
1	Adam van Koeverden	Canada	3:28.697	Q
2	Marko Tomićević	Serbia	3:30.693	Q
3	Miroslav Kirchev	Bulgaria	3:30.768	Q
4	Jorge García	Cuba	3:30.852	Q
5	Tim Brabants	Great Britain	3:31.869	Q
6	Pavel Nikolaev	Russia	3:35.466	
7	Maximilian Benassi	Italy	3:35.543	
8	Joshua Utanga	Cook Islands	4:32.064	

==== Heat 2 ====
Rank	Canoer	Country	Time	Notes
1	Anders Gustafsson	Sweden	3:34.419	Q
2	Ben Fouhy	New Zealand	3:35.610	Q
3	Aleh Yurenia	Belarus	3:36.012	Q
4	Zhou Yubo	China	3:36.994	Q
5	Francisco Cubelos	Spain	3:37.791	Q
6	Ahmad Reza Talebian	Iran	3:39.504	
7	Mostafa Mansour	Egypt	4:09.651	

==== Heat 3 ====
Rank	Canoer	Country	Time	Notes
1	René Holten Poulsen	Denmark	3:30.284	Q
2	Max Hoff	Germany	3:30.709	Q
3	Eirik Verås Larsen	Norway	3:31.288	Q
4	Mohamed Mrabet	Tunisia	3:32.204	Q
5	Cyrille Carré	France	3:32.705	Q
6	Murray Stewart	Australia	3:32.768	q
7	Marek Krajčovič	Slovakia	3:39.649	

=== Semifinals ===
The fastest four canoeists in each semifinal qualify for the 'A' final (medal race). The slowest four canoeists in each semifinal qualify for the 'B' final (consolation race).

==== Semifinal 1 ====
Rank	Canoer	Country	Time	Notes
1	Adam van Koeverden	Canada	3:28.209	Q
2	Eirik Verås Larsen	Norway	3:29.547	Q
3	René Holten Poulsen	Denmark	3:30.247	Q
4	Tim Brabants	Great Britain	3:30.769	Q
5	Miroslav Kirchev	Bulgaria	3:30.818	
6	Ben Fouhy	New Zealand	3:32.572	
7	Zhou Yubo	China	3:36.163	
8	Cyrille Carré	France	3:38.981	

==== Semifinal 2 ====
Rank	Canoer	Country	Time	Notes
1	Max Hoff	Germany	3:29.294	Q
2	Aleh Yurenia	Belarus	3:29.825	Q
3	Anders Gustafsson	Sweden	3:31.149	Q
4	Francisco Cubelos	Spain	3:31.833	Q
5	Jorge García	Cuba	3:31.937	
6	Murray Stewart	Australia	3:32.975	
7	Marko Tomićević	Serbia	3:43.589	
8	Mohamed Mrabet	Tunisia	3:44.545	

=== Finals ===
==== Final B ====
Rank	Canoer	Country	Time
1	Jorge García	Cuba	3:29.938
2	Marko Tomićević	Serbia	3:30.754
3	Miroslav Kirchev	Bulgaria	3:33.051
4	Cyrille Carré	France	3:33.513
5	Mohamed Mrabet	Tunisia	3:33.515
6	Ben Fouhy	New Zealand	3:34.710
7	Zhou Yubo	China	3:36.110
8	Murray Stewart	Australia	3:40.834

==== Final A ====
Rank	Canoer	Country	Time
1st place, gold medalist(s)	Eirik Verås Larsen	Norway	3:26.462
2nd place, silver medalist(s)	Adam van Koeverden	Canada	3:27.170
3rd place, bronze medalist(s)	Max Hoff	Germany	3:27.759
4	René Holten Poulsen	Denmark	3:29.483
5	Anders Gustafsson	Sweden	3:29.919
6	Aleh Yurenia	Belarus	3:32.396
7	Francisco Cubelos	Spain	3:32.521
8	Tim Brabants	Great Britain	3:34.833
