= Canoeing at the 2019 Pan American Games – Men's K-1 200 metres =

Men's K-1 200 metres at the 2019 Pan American Games
- Venue: Albufera Medio Mundo
- Dates: July 28–30
- Competitors: 15 from 15 nations
- Winning time: 35.456

Medalists
Gold medal	Dominik Crête	Canada
Silver medal	César de Cesare	Ecuador
Bronze medal	Rubén Rézola	Argentina

The men's K-1 200 metres canoeing event at the 2019 Pan American Games was held between the 28 and 30 of July at the Albufera Medio Mundo in the city of Huacho.

== Results ==
=== Heats ===
Qualification Rules: 1..3->Final, 4..7 and 8th best time->Semifinals, Rest Out

==== Heat 1 ====
Rank	Athletes	Country	Time	Notes
1	César de Cesare	Ecuador	34.983	F
2	Dominik Crête	Canada	35.470	F
3	Stanton Collins	United States	37.313	F
4	Renier Mora	Cuba	38.578	SF
5	Eddy Barranco	Puerto Rico	39.245	SF
6	Nicholas Robinson	Trinidad and Tobago	41.328	SF
7	Jeffrey Gonzalez	Guatemala	42.030	SF
	Clive Greyson	Jamaica	DNS	

==== Heat 2 ====
Rank	Athletes	Country	Time	Notes
1	Rubén Rézola	Argentina	35.144	F
2	Edson Silva	Brazil	36.189	F
3	Miguel Valencia	Chile	36.856	F
4	Alberto Briones	Mexico	37.329	SF
5	Cristian Guerrero	Dominican Republic	38.219	SF
6	Julian Cabrera	Uruguay	39.051	SF
7	Amado Cruz	Belize	39.371	SF
8	Edwin Amaya	Colombia	42.179	

=== Semifinal ===
Qualification Rules: 1..2->Final, Rest Out

Rank	Athletes	Country	Time	Notes
1	Renier Mora	Cuba	37.516	F
2	Cristian Guerrero	Dominican Republic	37.703	F
3	Julian Cabrera	Uruguay	37.988	
4	Eddy Barranco	Puerto Rico	38.251	
5	Alberto Briones	Mexico	38.281	
6	Amado Cruz	Belize	39.083	
7	Nicholas Robinson	Trinidad and Tobago	40.613	
8	Jeffrey Gonzalez	Guatemala	42.968	

=== Final ===
Rank	Athletes	Country	Time	Notes
1st place, gold medalist(s)	Dominik Crête	Canada	35.456	
2nd place, silver medalist(s)	César de Cesare	Ecuador	35.906	
3rd place, bronze medalist(s)	Rubén Rézola	Argentina	35.996	
4	Edson Silva	Brazil	36.946	
5	Miguel Valencia	Chile	37.266	
6	Stanton Collins	United States	37.829	
7	Renier Mora	Cuba	39.799	
8	Cristian Guerrero	Dominican Republic	39.934	
