= Canoeing at the 2010 South American Games – Men's K-1 500 metres =

The Men's K-1 500m event at the 2010 South American Games was held over March 28 at 9:40.

== Medalists ==
Gold	Silver	Bronze
Gilvan Ribeiro; Brazil	Joaquin Siriscevic; Argentina	Jhonson Jose Vergara; Venezuela

== Results ==
Rank	Athlete	Time
1st place, gold medalist(s)	Gilvan Ribeiro (BRA)	1:42.21
2nd place, silver medalist(s)	Joaquin Siriscevic (ARG)	1:43.33
3rd place, bronze medalist(s)	Jhonson Jose Vergara (VEN)	1:46.80
4	Christian Albert Oyarzun (ECU)	1:47.96
5	Yojan Cano (COL)	1:48.55
6	Martin Perez (URU)	1:50.57
7	Juan Carlos Estrada (BOL)	2:00.00
