= Canoeing at the 2010 South American Games =

Canoeing at the 2010 South American Games in Medellín was held from March 27 to March 29. All games were played at Villa Náutica Embalse de Guatapé.

== Medal summary ==
=== Medal table ===
Rank	Nation	Gold	Silver	Bronze	Total
1	Brazil (BRA)	16	4	3	23
2	Argentina (ARG)	6	6	2	14
3	Colombia (COL)	1	5	5	11
4	Chile (CHI)	1	2	5	8
5	Venezuela (VEN)	0	6	9	15
6	Ecuador (ECU)	0	1	0	1
Totals (6 entries)		24	24	24	72

== Men ==
Event	Gold	Silver	Bronze
C-1 200 m	Nivalter Jesus; Brazil	Ronny Ratia; Venezuela	Álvaro Sario Raguileo; Chile
C-1 500 m	Nivalter Jesus; Brazil	Andrés Felipe Arana; Ecuador	Sergio Díaz; Colombia
C-1 1000 m	Wladimir Moreno; Brazil	Johnnathan Francisco Quitral; Chile	Edward Luciano Paredes; Venezuela
C-2 200 m	Ronilson Oliveira; Erlon Silva; Brazil	Eduyn Labarca; Edward Luciano Paredes; Venezuela	Johnnathan Francisco Quitral; Fabián Antonio Valdés; Chile
C-2 500 m	Ronilson Oliveira; Erlon Silva; Brazil	Eduyn Labarca; Edward Luciano Paredes; Venezuela	Anderson Ospina; Jesús Felipe Ospina; Colombia
C-2 1000 m	Ronilson Oliveira; Erlon Silva; Brazil	Eduyn Labarca; Edward Luciano Paredes; Venezuela	Johnnathan Francisco Quitral; Fabián Antonio Valdés; Chile
K-1 200 m	Edson Silva; Brazil	Jhonson José Vergara; Venezuela	Rubén Voisar Resola; Argentina
K-1 500 m	Gilvan Ribeiro; Brazil	Joaquín Siriscevic; Argentina	Jhonson José Vergara; Venezuela
K-1 1000 m	Daniel Alfredo dal Bo; Argentina	João Rodrigues; Brazil	Yojan Cano; Colombia
K-2 200 m	Ricardo Barreto; Roberto Maheler; Brazil	Joaquín Siriscevic; Rubén Resola; Argentina	Giovanny Ramos; Gabriel Rodríguez; Venezuela
K-2 500 m	Givago Ribeiro; Edson Silva; Brazil	Juan Pablo de Gesus; Pablo de Torres; Argentina	Giovanny Ramos; Gabriel Rodríguez; Venezuela
K-2 1000 m	Michel Ferreira; Gilvan Ribeiro; Brazil	Jesús Andrés Colmenarez; Marcos Javier Pérez; Venezuela	Fernando Lohengrin Aguayo; Cristian Rodrigo Núñez; Chile
K-4 200 m	Celso Oliveira; Roberto Maheler; Gilvan Ribeiro; Edson Silva; Brazil	Juan Pablo Bergero; Joaquín Siriscevic; Rubén Resola; Daniel Alfredo dal Bo; Argentina	Jesús Andrés Colmenzarez; Marcos Javier Pérez; Giovanny Ramos; Gabriel Rodríguez; Venezuela
K-4 500 m	Juan Pablo Bergero; Joaquín Siriscevic; Rubén Resola; Daniel Alfredo dal Bo; Argentina	Celso Oliveira; Roberto Maheler; Givago Ribeiro; Edson Silva; Brazil	Jesús Andrés Colmenzarez; Marcos Javier Pérez; Giovanny Ramos; Gabriel Rodríguez; Venezuela
K-4 1000 m	Juan Pablo Bergero; Daniel Alfredo dal Bo; Pablo de Torres; Nelson Roberto Sallette; Argentina	Celso Oliveira; Roberto Maheler; Givago Ribeiro; Edson Silva; Brazil	Jesús Andrés Colmenzarez; Marcos Javier Pérez; Giovanny Ramos; Gabriel Rodríguez; Venezuela

== Women ==
Event	Gold	Silver	Bronze
K-1 200 m	María Fernanda Lauro; Argentina	Tatiana Muñoz; Colombia	Eliana Escalona; Venezuela
K-1 500 m	María Fernanda Lauro; Argentina	Tatiana Muñoz; Colombia	Naiane Pereira; Brazil
K-1 1000 m	María Fernanda Lauro; Argentina	Tatiana Muñoz; Colombia	Naiane Pereira; Brazil
K-2 200 m	Juliana Domingos; Naiane Pereira; Brazil	María Fernanda Lauro; Maria Magdalena Garro; Argentina	Aura María Ospina; Tatiana Muñoz; Colombia
K-2 500 m	Aura María Ospina; Tatiana Muñoz; Colombia	Juliana Domingos; Naiane Pereira; Brazil	María Cecilia Collueque; María Fernanda Lauro; Argentina
K-2 1000 m	Bárbara Alejandra Gómez; Fabiola Alejandra Pavez; Chile	Aura María Ospina; Tatiana Muñoz; Colombia	Juliana Domingos; Naiane Pereira; Brazil
K-4 200 m	Daniela Alvarez; Juliana Domingos; Naiane Pereira; Ariela Pinto; Brazil	Natalin Fontanini; Maria Magdalena Garro; María Fernanda Lauro; María Cecilia Collueque; Argentina	Aura María Ospina; Tatiana Muñoz; Ruth Niño; Ivonne Fonseca; Colombia
K-4 500 m	Juliana Domingos; Bruna Gama; Naiane Pereira; Ariela Pinto; Brazil	Bárbara Alejandra Gómez; Ysumy Omayra Trigo; Yanara Alejandra Santander; Fabiola Alejandra Pavez; Chile	Eliana Escalona; Yuleidis Coromoto Ramos; Andreina Silva; Vanessa Yorsel Silva; Venezuela
K-4 1000 m	Juliana Domingos; Bruna Gama; Naiane Pereira; Ariela Pinto; Brazil	Aura María Ospina; Tatiana Muñoz; Ruth Niño; María Santacruz; Colombia	Bárbara Alejandra Gómez; Ysumy Omayra Trigo; Yanara Alejandra Santander; Fabiola Alejandra Pavez; Chile
