= Celso Oliveira =

Brazilian canoeist (born 1988)

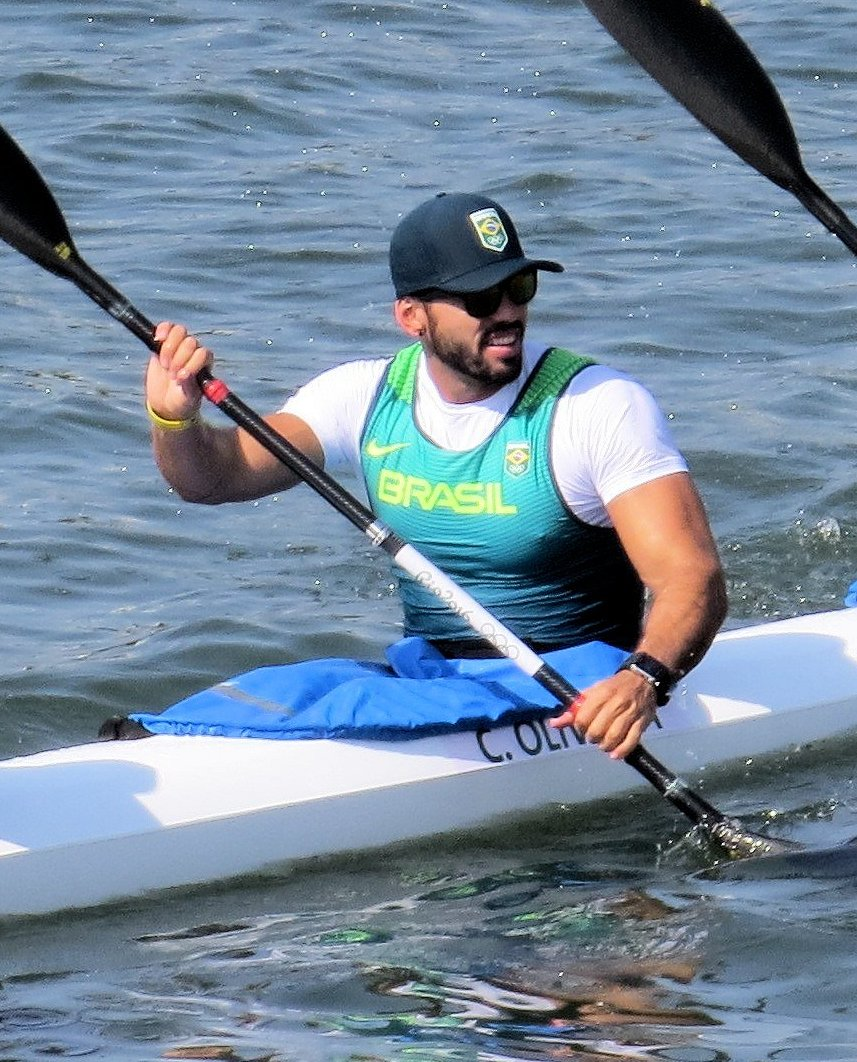
- Oliveira at the 2016 Summer Olympics

Personal information
- Full name: Celso Dias de Oliveira Júnior
- Born: 28 October 1988 (age 37) São Paulo, Brazil
- Height: 188 cm (6 ft 2 in)
- Weight: 88 kg (194 lb)
Medal record
Men's canoe sprint
Representing Brazil
Pan American Games
Silver medal – second place	2015 Toronto	K–4 1000 m
Bronze medal – third place	2015 Toronto	K–2 1000 m
Bronze medal – third place	2011 Guadalajara	K–4 1000 m
South American Games
Gold medal – first place	2010 Medellín	K–4 200 m
Silver medal – second place	2010 Medellín	K–4 500 m
Silver medal – second place	2010 Medellín	K–4 1000 m

Celso Dias de Oliveira Júnior (born 28 October 1988) is a Brazilian canoeist. He competed in the men's K-4 1000 metres event at the 2016 Summer Olympics.
