= Kasper Bleibach =

Danish sprint canoer

Medal record

World Championships
Bronze medal – third place	2011 Szeged	K-1 4 x 200 m

European Championships
Gold medal – first place	2008 Rome	K-1 500 m
Gold medal – first place	2009 Brandenburg	K-1 4 x 200 m
Gold medal – first place	2012 Zagreb	K-4 1000 m
Bronze medal – third place	2011 Belgrade	K-1 500 m

Kasper Bleibach (born 1 March 1984) is a Danish sprint canoeist who competed in the late 2000s. At the 2008 Summer Olympics in Beijing, he was eliminated in the semifinals of the K-1 500 m event. In 2008 he also won the K1 500m at Canoe Sprint European Championships. At the 2012 Summer Olympics, he was eliminated in the semi-finals of the K-1 200 m event, but reached the final of the K-4 1000 m event, finishing in fifth. That year, he was also part of the winning team the K-4 1000 m at the European Championships.
