= Canoeing at the 2015 Pan American Games – Men's C-1 200 metres =

Men's C-1 200 metres at the 2015 Pan American Games
- Venue: Welland Pan Am Flatwater Centre
- Dates: July 12–14
- Competitors: 10 from 10 nations
- Winning time: 39.991

Medalists
Gold medal	Isaquias Queiroz	Brazil
Silver medal	Jason McCoombs	Canada
Bronze medal	Arnold Rodríguez	Cuba

The men's C-1 200 metres canoeing event at the 2015 Pan American Games will be held between the 12 and 14 of July at the Welland Pan Am Flatwater Centre in Welland.

== Schedule ==
The following is the competition schedule for the event:

All times are Eastern Daylight Time (UTC−4)

Date	Time	Round
July 12, 2015	10:30	Heat 1
July 12, 2015	10:37	Heat 2
July 12, 2015	11:36	Semi-finals
July 14, 2015	9:35	Finals

== Results ==
=== Heats ===
Qualification Rules: 1..3->Final, 4..7 and 8th best time->Semifinals, Rest Out

==== Heat 1 ====
Rank	Athletes	Country	Time	Notes
1	Isaquias Queiroz	Brazil	40.189	F
2	Ronny Ratia	Venezuela	42.354	F
3	Johnnathan Tafra	Chile	43.670	F
4	Jonathan Ballina	Mexico	44.377	SF
5	Sergio Díaz	Colombia	45.675	SF

==== Heat 2 ====
Rank	Athletes	Country	Time	Notes
1	Jason McCoombs	Canada	41.002	F
2	Arnold Rodríguez	Cuba	41.683	F
3	Jordan González Branda	Ecuador	43.659	F
4	Ariel Jimenéz	Dominican Republic	44.923	SF
5	Facundo Pagiola	Argentina	46.315	SF

=== Semifinal ===
Qualification Rules: 1..3->Final, Rest Out

Rank	Athletes	Country	Time	Notes
1	Jonathan Ballina	Mexico	44.566	F
2	Sergio Díaz	Colombia	45.259	F
3	Ariel Jiménez	Dominican Republic	45.333	F
4	Facundo Pagiola	Argentina	46.585	

=== Final ===
Rank	Athletes	Country	Time	Notes
1st place, gold medalist(s)	Isaquias Queiroz	Brazil	39.991	
2nd place, silver medalist(s)	Jason McCoombs	Canada	41.333	
3rd place, bronze medalist(s)	Arnold Rodríguez	Cuba	41.459	
4	Jordan González Branda	Ecuador	42.925	
5	Ronny Ratia	Venezuela	42.931	
6	Johnnathan Tafra	Chile	44.242	
7	Jonathan Ballina	Mexico	44.911	
8	Ariel Jiménez	Dominican Republic	45.145	
9	Sergio Díaz	Colombia	45.942	
