= Maxime Richard =

Belgian sprint canoeist

Personal information
- Born: 14 April 1988 (age 38) Dinant, Belgium
- Height: 178 cm (5 ft 10 in)
- Weight: 75 kg (165 lb)

Sport
- Country: Belgium
- Sport: Canoe sprint

Maxime Richard (born 14 April 1988 in Dinant) is a Belgian sprint canoeist. At the 2012 Summer Olympics, he competed in the Men's K-1 200 metres.
