= Pavel Nikolaev =

Russian canoeist

Personal information
- Born: 14 November 1984 (age 41) Moscow
- Height: 191 cm (6 ft 3 in)
- Weight: 91 kg (201 lb)

Sport
- Country: Russia
- Sport: Canoe sprint

Pavel Nikolaev (Павел Николаев, born 14 November 1984) is a Russian sprint canoeist. At the 2012 Summer Olympics, he competed in the Men's K-1 1000 metres.
