= Zhou Yubo =

Chinese canoeist

Medal record

Men's sprint canoe

Representing China

Asian Championships
Gold medal – first place	2011 Tehran	K-4 1000 m
Silver medal – second place	2011 Tehran	K-1 500 m

Zhou Yubo is a Chinese sprint canoeist. At the 2012 Summer Olympics, he competed in the Men's K-1 200 metres, and Men's K-1 1000 metres.
