= Canoeing at the 2012 Summer Olympics – Men's K-1 200 metres =

Men's canoe sprint K-1 200 metres at the Games of the XXX Olympiad
- Venue: Eton Dorney
- Date: 10 to 11 August
- Competitors: 20 from 20 nations
- Winning time: 36.246

Medalists
1st place, gold medalist(s)		Ed McKeever	Great Britain
2nd place, silver medalist(s)		Saúl Craviotto	Spain
3rd place, bronze medalist(s)		Mark de Jonge	Canada

The men's canoe sprint K-1 200 metres competition at the 2012 Olympic Games in London took place between 10 and 11 August at Eton Dorney.

Great Britain's Ed McKeever won the gold medal, ahead of Saúl Craviotto from Spain who won silver. Mark de Jonge from Canada took bronze.

== Competition format ==
The competition comprised heats, semifinals, and a final round. The top five boats from each heat, and the fastest loser, advanced to the semifinals. The top four boats in each semifinal advanced to the "A" final, and competed for medals. A placing "B" final was held for the other semifinalists.

== Schedule ==
All times are British Summer Time (UTC+01:00)

Date	Time	Round
Friday 10 August 2012	09:30; 11:02	Heats; Semifinals
Saturday 11 August 2012	09:30	Finals

== Results ==
=== Heats ===
The five best placed boats in each heat and the fastest sixth placed both qualify for the semifinals.

==== Heat 1 ====
Rank	Canoer	Country	Time	Notes
1	Mark de Jonge	Canada	35.396	Q
2	Piotr Siemionowski	Poland	35.990	Q
3	Momotaro Matsushita	Japan	36.096	Q
4	Egidijus Balčiūnas	Lithuania	36.173	Q
5	César de Cesare	Ecuador	36.181	Q
6	Murray Stewart	Australia	37.202	
7	Mohamed Mrabet	Tunisia	38.291	

==== Heat 2 ====
Rank	Canoer	Country	Time	Notes
1	Ed McKeever	Great Britain	35.087	Q, OB
2	Marko Novaković	Serbia	35.212	Q
3	Miklós Dudás	Hungary	35.323	Q
4	Yevgeny Salakhov	Russia	35.652	Q
5	Maxime Richard	Belgium	36.125	Q
6	Tim Hornsby	United States	36.560	q
7	Mostafa Mansour	Egypt	40.507	

==== Heat 3 ====
Rank	Canoer	Country	Time	Notes
1	Saúl Craviotto	Spain	35.552	Q
2	Maxime Beaumont	France	35.571	Q
3	Kasper Bleibach	Denmark	36.610	Q
4	Ronald Rauhe	Germany	36.817	Q
5	Zhou Yubo	China	38.316	Q
6	Joshua Utanga	Cook Islands	38.966	

=== Semifinals ===
The fastest four canoeists in each semifinal qualify for the 'A' final. The slowest four canoeists in each semifinal qualify for the 'B' final.

==== Semifinal 1 ====
Rank	Canoer	Country	Time	Notes
1	Mark de Jonge	Canada	35.595	Q
2	Saúl Craviotto	Spain	35.597	Q
3	Marko Novaković	Serbia	36.293	Q
4	Yevgeny Salakhov	Russia	36.312	Q
5	Kasper Bleibach	Denmark	36.667	
6	César de Cesare	Ecuador	36.975	
7	Momotaro Matsushita	Japan	37.201	
8	Zhou Yubo	China	39.042	

==== Semifinal 2 ====
Rank	Canoer	Country	Time	Notes
1	Ed McKeever	Great Britain	35.619	Q
2	Maxime Beaumont	France	35.814	Q
3	Miklós Dudás	Hungary	35.993	Q
4	Ronald Rauhe	Germany	36.183	Q
5	Egidijus Balčiūnas	Lithuania	36.495	
6	Piotr Siemionowski	Poland	36.507	
7	Maxime Richard	Belgium	37.029	
8	Tim Hornsby	United States	37.660	

=== Finals ===
==== Final B ====
Rank	Canoer	Country	Time	Notes
1	Kasper Bleibach	Denmark	37.802	
2	Egidijus Balčiūnas	Lithuania	37.995	
3	Momotaro Matsushita	Japan	38.040	
4	César de Cesare	Ecuador	38.075	
5	Maxime Richard	Belgium	38.435	
6	Piotr Siemionowski	Poland	38.585	
7	Tim Hornsby	United States	39.370	
8	Zhou Yubo	China	40.157	

==== Final A ====
Rank	Canoer	Country	Time	Notes
1st place, gold medalist(s)	Ed McKeever	Great Britain	36.246	
2nd place, silver medalist(s)	Saúl Craviotto	Spain	36.540	
3rd place, bronze medalist(s)	Mark de Jonge	Canada	36.657	
4	Maxime Beaumont	France	36.688	
5	Yevgeny Salakhov	Russia	36.825	
6	Miklós Dudás	Hungary	36.830	
7	Marko Novaković	Serbia	37.094	
8	Ronald Rauhe	Germany	37.553	
