= Gilvan Ribeiro =

Brazilian canoeist (born 1989)

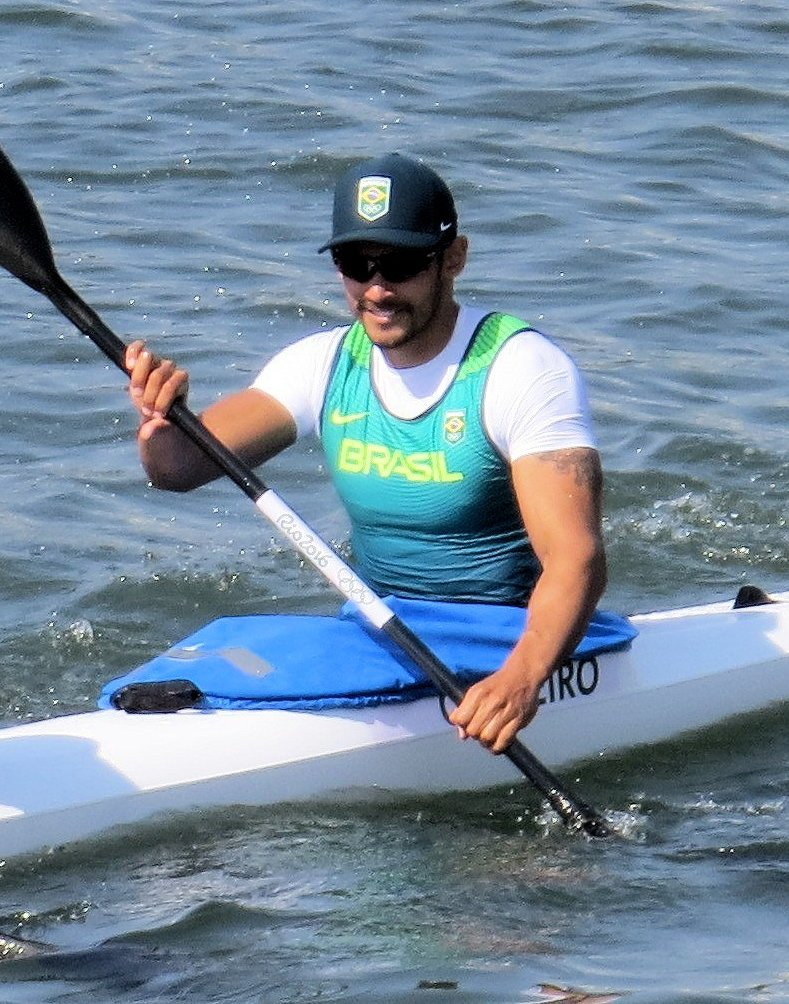
- Ribeiro at the 2016 Summer Olympics

Personal information
- Full name: Gilvan Bitencourt Ribeiro
- Born: 8 May 1989 (age 37) Cruz Alta, Rio Grande do Sul
- Height: 180 cm (5 ft 11 in)
- Weight: 83 kg (183 lb)
Medal record
Men's canoe sprint
Representing Brazil
Pan American Games
Silver medal – second place	2015 Toronto	K–4 1000 m
Bronze medal – third place	2011 Guadalajara	K–4 1000 m
South American Games
Gold medal – first place	2010 Medellín	K–1 500 m
Gold medal – first place	2010 Medellín	K–2 500 m
Gold medal – first place	2010 Medellín	K–4 200 m

Gilvan Bitencourt Ribeiro (born 8 May 1989) is a Brazilian canoeist. He competed in the men's K-2 200 metres event at the 2016 Summer Olympics.
