= Ed McKeever =

British kayak athlete (born 1983)

Ed McKeever MBE
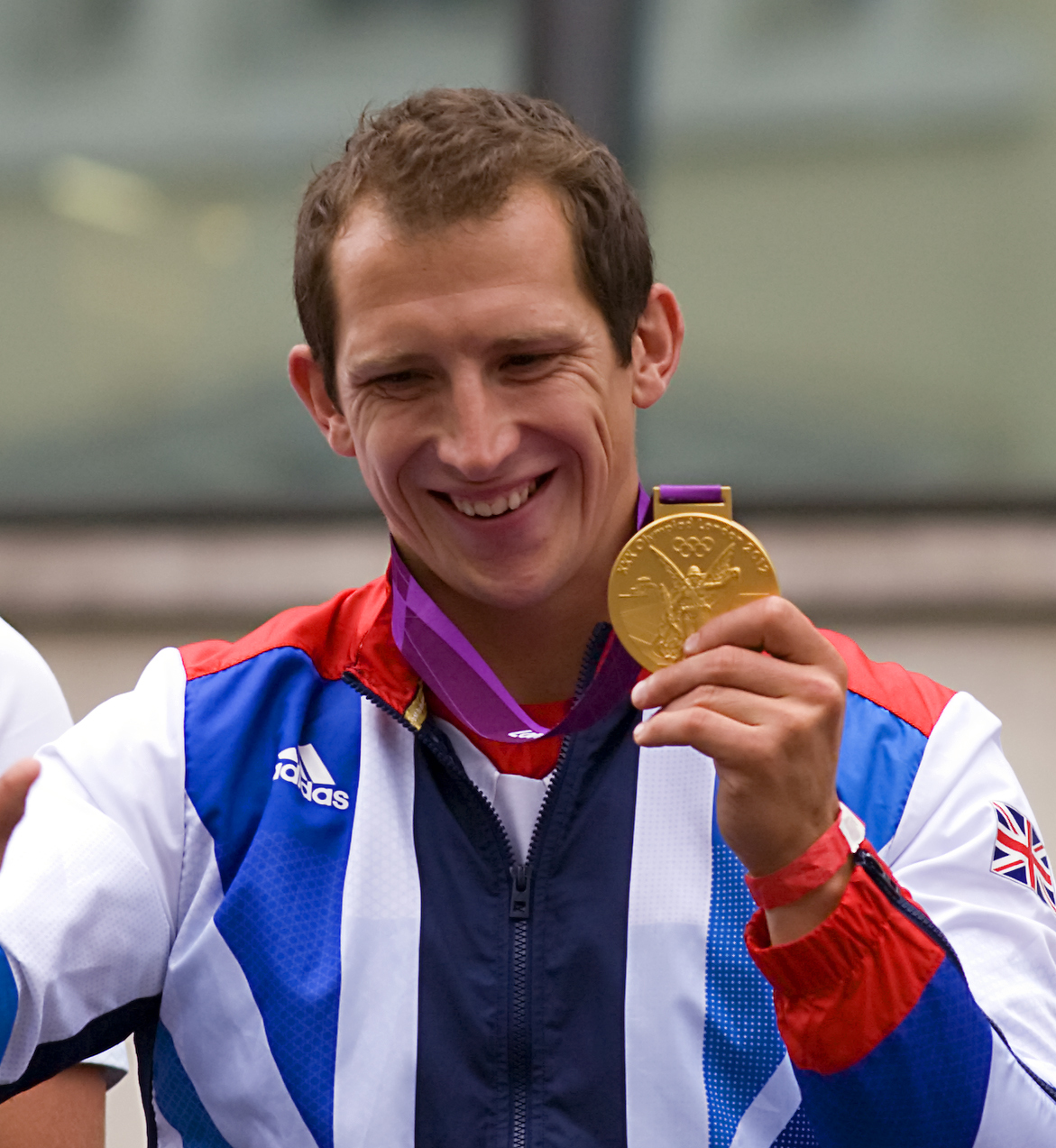
- Born: 27 August 1983 (age 43); Bath, Somerset, England
- Education: Kingston University
- Occupation: Part Qualified Accountant With ACCA
- Agent: Alexander Nikonorov
- Height: 1.73 m (5 ft 8 in)
- Website: Official website

Ed McKeever
Medal record

Men's canoe sprint

Olympic Games
Gold medal – first place	2012 London	K-1 200 m

World Championships
Gold medal – first place	2010 Poznań	K-1 200 m
Silver medal – second place	2010 Poznań	K-1 4 × 200 m
Silver medal – second place	2011 Szeged	K-1 200 m
Bronze medal – third place	2014 Moscow	K-1 200 m
Bronze medal – third place	2014 Moscow	K-1 4x200 m

European Games
Silver medal – second place	2015 Baku	K-1 200 m

European Championships
Gold medal – first place	2010 Trasona	K-1 200 m
Silver medal – second place	2014 Brandenburg	K-1 200 m
Bronze medal – third place	2011 Belgrade	K-1 200 m
Bronze medal – third place	2012 Zagreb	K-1 200 m

Edward Daniel McKeever MBE (born 27 August 1983) is a British kayak athlete. He is a former European, World and Olympic champion.

McKeever won the gold medal at the 2012 Olympic Games in the K-1 200m event.

He won two medals at the 2010 ICF Canoe Sprint World Championships in Poznań with a gold in the K-1 200 m and a silver in the K-1 4 × 200 m events, and a further silver in the K-1 200m at the 2011 event in Szeged.

== World Championships ==
In 2012 McKeever won the K1 200m event at the World Cup in Poznan he also won the K1 200m at the European Championships in 2010 Trasona, Spain and the kayak World Cup race in Szeged, Hungary. McKeever still competes for the Bradford on Avon rowing club, despite moving to south Buckinghamshire to train at the 2012 Olympic race venue of Dorney lake.

In 2012, McKeever won gold medal in the K1 200m event, in Canoe sprint World Cup.

== Olympics 2012 ==
He competed in the canoe sprint team for London Olympics 2012 in the Men’s K1 200m. He qualified for the K1 200m final after achieving a new Olympic best of 35.087 seconds in the heats and on 11 August he won the gold medal in the event.

McKeever was appointed Member of the Order of the British Empire (MBE) in the 2013 New Year Honours for services to kayaking.

== See also ==
- 2012 Olympics gold post boxes in the United Kingdom
