= Vagner Souta =

Brazilian canoeist

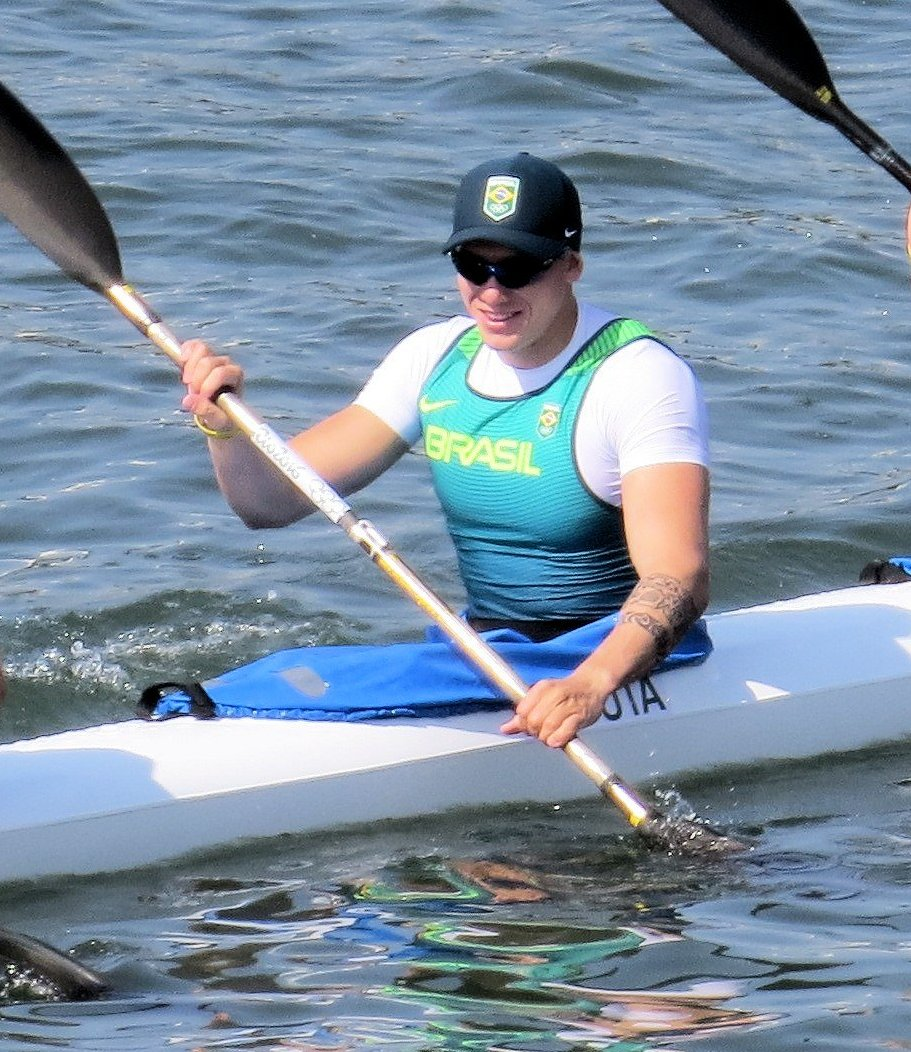
- Souta at the 2016 Summer Olympics

Personal information
- Full name: Vagner Júnior Souta
- Born: 10 February 1991 (age 35) Guarantã do Norte, Brazil
- Height: 187 cm (6 ft 2 in)
- Weight: 84 kg (185 lb)
Medal record
Men's canoe sprint
Representing Brazil
Pan American Games
Silver medal – second place	2015 Toronto	K–4 1000 m
Bronze medal – third place	2015 Toronto	K–2 1000 m
Bronze medal – third place	2019 Lima	K–1 1000 m
Bronze medal – third place	2026 Santa Fe	Mixed K-2 500 m

Vagner Júnior Souta (born 10 February 1991) is a Brazilian canoeist. He competed in the men's K-4 1000 metres events at the 2016 Summer Olympics. He also competed at the 2020 Summer Olympics and the 2024 Summer Olympics.
