= Dominik Crête =

Canadian kayaker

Personal information
- Nationality: Canadian
- Born: Cap-de-la-Madeleine, Quebec
- Height: 1.80 m (5 ft 11 in)
- Weight: 88 kg (194 lb)

Sport
- Sport: Sprint kayak
- Event: K-1 200
Medal record
Men's canoe sprint
Representing Canada
Pan American Games
Gold medal – first place	2019 Lima	K-1 200 m

Dominik Crête is a Canadian kayaker who competes primarily in the sprint distances.

== Kayaking career ==
Crête is the reigning Pan American Games champion in the K-1 200 m distance.

He started kayaking at the age of 11 but quit to focus on football.

A meeting with Olympian Richard Dober Jr. in 2015 convinced him to return to the sport of kayaking.
