= César de Cesare =

Ecuadorian canoeist

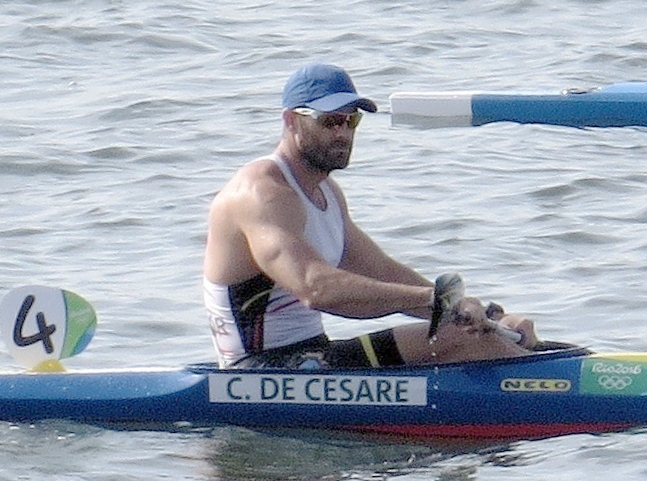
- Cesare at the 2016 Olympics

Personal information
- Born: 12 July 1980 (age 45) Morón, Buenos Aires, Argentina
- Height: 190 cm (6 ft 3 in)
- Weight: 92 kg (203 lb)

Sport
- Sport: Canoe sprint
- Coached by: Sebastian de Cesare (brother)
Medal record
Representing Ecuador
Pan American Games
Gold medal – first place	2011 Guadalajara	K-1 200 m
Silver medal – second place	2019 Lima	K-1 200 m
Bronze medal – third place	2015 Toronto	K-1 200 m

César Ernesto de Cesare (born 12 July 1980) is an Argentine-born Ecuadorian sprint canoeist. He won the K-1 200 m event at the 2011 Pan American Games and finished third in 2015; he also had a fourth-place finish at the 2013 World Championships. He placed 11th–12th at the 2012 and 2016 Olympics and served as the Olympic flag bearer for Ecuador in 2012.

Cesare is married to Mayra and has two daughters, Luana and Maia. He took up kayaking in Argentina around 1990, and semi-retired for ten years in 1999 due to a shoulder injury. During that time he worked as a taxi and truck driver to support his family. In 2009, he immigrated to Ecuador to help his younger brother Sebastian, who coached the Ecuadorian canoe team. In Ecuador he resumed competing, and received Ecuadorian citizenship the day before leaving for the 2011 World Championships. In December 2011 he was named Athlete of the Month by the International Canoe Federation.

Olympic Games
Preceded by Alexandra Escobar	Flagbearer for Ecuador; London 2012	Succeeded by Estefania García
