= Joshua Utanga =

Cook Islands canoeist (born 1988)

Joshua Utanga (born 7 June 1988) is a Cook Islands sprint canoeist convicted of assault against a female. At the 2012 Summer Olympics, he competed in the Men's K-1 200 metres.

== Personal life ==
Utanga was raised in Tauranga, New Zealand, by parents Nga and Sandra. When he was 18, he left home and lived in Gold Coast.

Utanga was convicted of two counts of assault on his ex partner on 27 July 2023 in the High Court, Rarotonga.

== Career ==
Utanga first competed at an international level in the canoe sprint at the 2009 world championships in Canada. He later participated at the 2012 Summer Olympics as part of the Cook Islands team.
