= Fidel Antonio Vargas =

Cuban canoeist (born 1992)

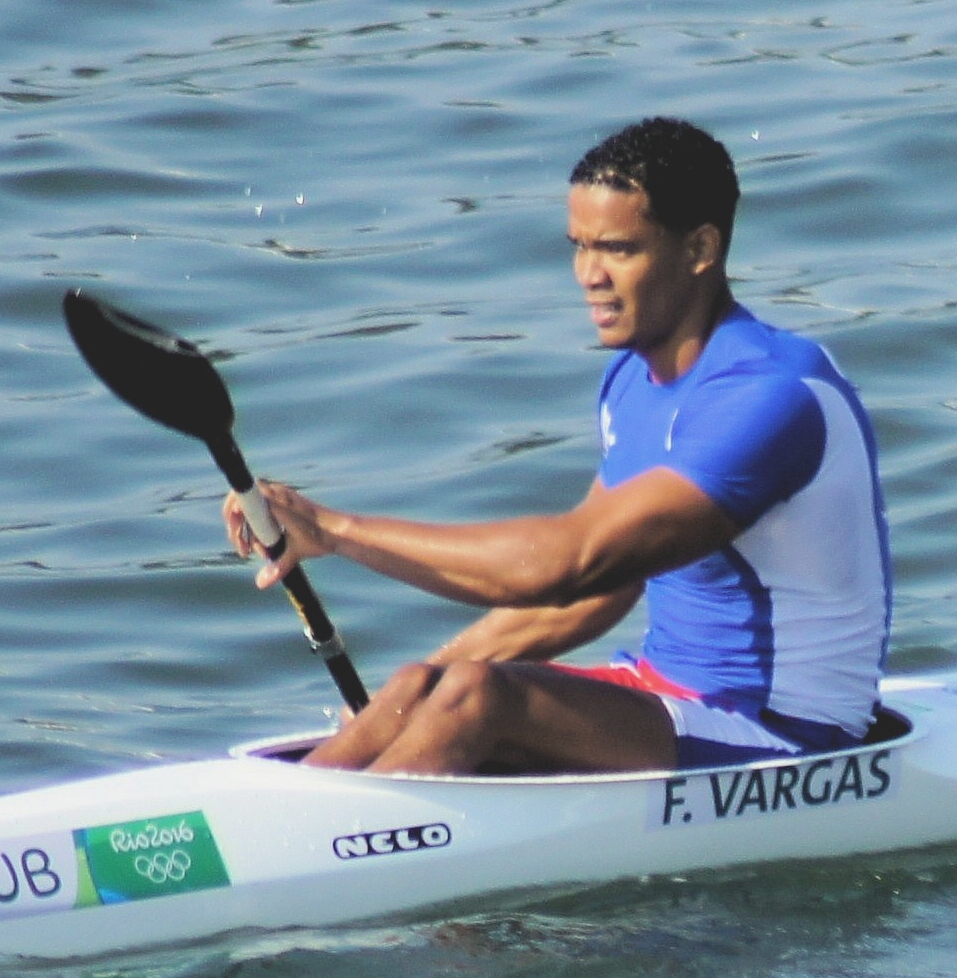
- Vargas at the 2016 Olympics

Personal information
- Born: 28 July 1992 (age 34) Santiago, Cuba
- Height: 186 cm (6 ft 1 in)
- Weight: 91 kg (201 lb)

Sport
- Sport: Canoe sprint
Medal record
Representing Cuba
Pan American Games
Silver medal – second place	2015 Toronto	K-2 200 m
Silver medal – second place	2019 Lima	K-4 500 m

Fidel Antonio Vargas (born 28 July 1992) is a Cuban canoeist who won a silver medal in the K-2 200 m event at the 2015 Pan American Games, together with Reiner Torres. He competed in the individual 200 m at the 2016 Summer Olympics, but failed to reach the final.
