= Jason McCoombs =

Canadian canoeist (born 1993)

Personal information
- Born: April 24, 1993 (age 33) Dartmouth, Nova Scotia, Canada

Sport
- Sport: Canoeing
- Event(s): C-1 500m, C-1 200m
- Club: Banook Canoe Club
Medal record
World Championships
Bronze medal – third place	2013 Duisburg	4 x C–1 200 m
U23 World Championships
Silver medal – second place	2013 Niagara	C-1 200 m
Pan American Games
Silver medal – second place	2015 Toronto	C-1 200 m
Junior Pan American Championships
Gold medal – first place	2010 Mexico	C-1 200 m
Gold medal – first place	2010 Mexico	C-1 500 m
Gold medal – first place	2010 Mexico	C-2 200 m
Silver medal – second place	2010 Mexico	C-1 1000 m
Silver medal – second place	2010 Mexico	C-4 1000 m
Canada Games
Gold medal – first place	2009 Charlottetown	C-1 200 m
Gold medal – first place	2009 Charlottetown	C-1 500 m
Gold medal – first place	2009 Charlottetown	C-2 1000 m

Jason McCoombs (born April 24, 1993) is a Canadian sprint canoeist.

His home club is the Banook Canoe Club in Dartmouth, Nova Scotia, Canada. As a 16-year-old at the 2009 Canada Games McCoombs represented Nova Scotia where he won three gold medals, two individually in the 200 and 500 m, as well as one in the C-2 1000 m. He won another three gold medals at the 2010 Junior Pan American Canoe Championships in Mexico in the C-1 200m, 500m and the C-2 200m. In addition he won two silver medals in the C-1 1000m and C-4 1000m.

McCoombs competed at the 2012 Summer Olympics in the C-1 200 metres event placing 12th. At the 2013 Under-23 World Championships in Niagara he claimed the silver medal in the C-1 200m.
