= Juan Ignacio Cáceres =

Argentine canoeist (born 1992)

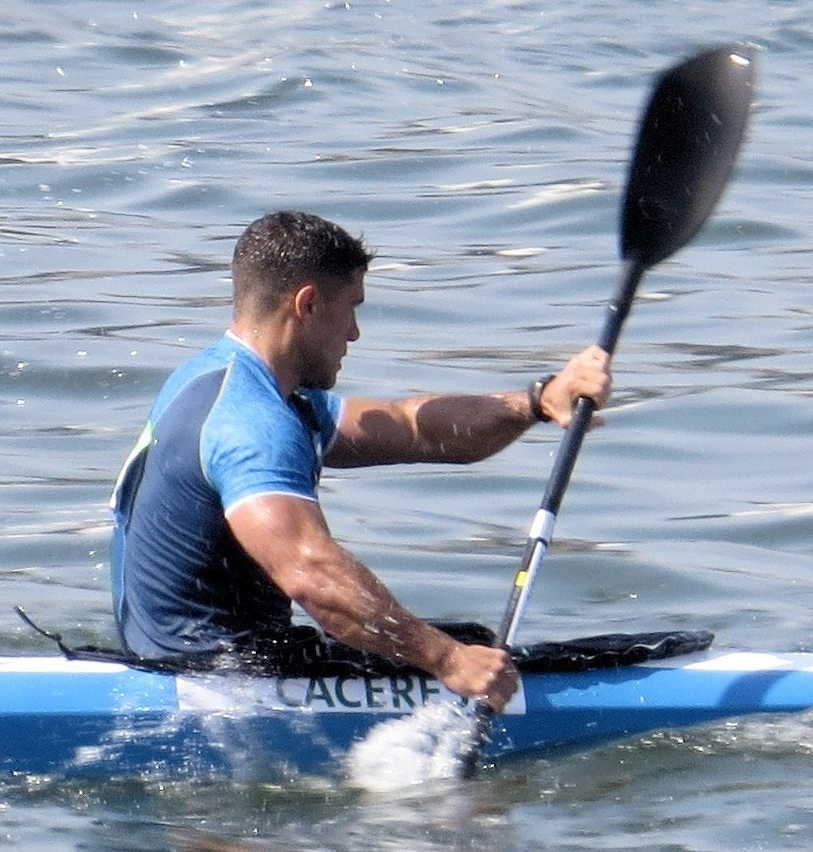
- Cáceres at the 2016 Olympics

Personal information
- Born: 31 January 1992 (age 34)
- Height: 168 cm (5 ft 6 in)
- Weight: 75 kg (165 lb)

Sport
- Sport: Canoe sprint
- Club: Canotaje Las Flores
- Coached by: Diego Canepa
Medal record
Representing Argentina
Pan American Games
Gold medal – first place	2019 Lima	K-4 500 m
Bronze medal – third place	2015 Toronto	K-4 1000 m

Juan Ignacio Cáceres (born 31 January 1992) is an Argentine sprint canoeist who mostly competes in the four-man K-4 1000 m event. He won a bronze medal at the 2015 Pan American Games and placed 12th at the 2016 Olympics. He won the gold medal in the K-4 500m event at the 2019 Pan American Games.

Cáceres took up kayaking in 2003, and in 2012 was named Sportsperson of the Year in Las Flores, Argentina.
