= Tim Hornsby =

American canoeist

Personal information
- Born: 20 July 1986 (age 39) Atlanta, Georgia, United States

Sport
- Sport: Canoeing; Sailing

Tim Hornsby (born July 20, 1986, in Atlanta, Georgia) is a professional sailor, America's Cup sailor, and world champion that currently lives in Halifax, Canada. He competed with American Magic in the 36th America's cupHe continued with American Magic for the 37th America’s Cup.

In 2022 Tim joined Canada SailGP Team for season 3,4,5 and 6, and with nine podiums including a win in Christchurch, New Zealand and a win in Los Angeles. Outside of his sailing roles, Tim is also the Technical Director of the NorthStar SailGP Team.

In 2023 he became Maxi 72 World Champion and 2024 European Champion as a part of the crew of “Bella Mente.”

Prior to his sailing career he was as an American sprint kayaker. At the 2012 Summer Olympics, he competed in the Men's K-1 200 metres.

He is a 10x World championship team member, 3x Olympic trials winner, American record holder, Pan am games medalist, and many time national champion.

His 2012 qualification was through a long and difficult route. He won the Men’s K1 200m event at the 2011 Sprint National Championships in Gainesville, Georgia on August 6. However, US teammate Ryan Dolan had achieved the result that gave the US an Olympic canoeing quota slot for the U.S. at the 2011 Pan American Games in Guadalajara, Mexico on October 28.

Hornsby then won the 2012 U.S. Olympic Team Trials in Oklahoma City on April 20, forcing a race-off between the two at the first two 2012 World Cups. Hornsby then achieved a 14th-place finish at the 2012 World Cup No. 2 in Duisburg, Germany, on May 27, clinching the US K-1 200 m Olympic place for himself as his result was better than Dolan's.

Hornsby's home club is the Lanier Canoe and Kayak Club. Lake Lanier hosted the canoe, kayak and rowing events at the Atlanta Olympics, but Hornsby is the first Olympian they have produced.

== Kayak career highlights ==
- 2016 USA Olympic Trials in Gainesville, Georgia: 1st in K1 200m
- 2015 World Cup: 8th in K1-200m
- 2014 World Championships: 11th in K1 200M
- 2013 World Cup No. 2: 6th in K1 200m
- 2013 U.S. National Team Trials in Oklahoma City, Okla.: 1st in K1 200m
- 2012 U.S. Olympic Team Trials: 1st in K1 200m
- 2011 Pan American Games: 5th in K2 200m
- 2011 World Cup No. 3: 14th in K2 200m
- 2011 National Championships: 1st K1 200m
- 2010 Vichy World Cup: 11th in K1 200m
- 2008 Olympic training partner
- 2008 USA Olympic Trials in Oklahoma, City: 1st K2 500m, 1st K4 1000m
- 2008 Szeged World Cup: 4th in K1 200m, 8th in K2 500m, 8th in K2 1000m
- 2006 Pan American Championships: 3rd in K1 200m
- 2004 Olympic Trials: 4th K4 1000m
- 2003 Jr. World Championships: 11th K2-1000m
