= Gonzalo Carreras =

Argentinean canoeist

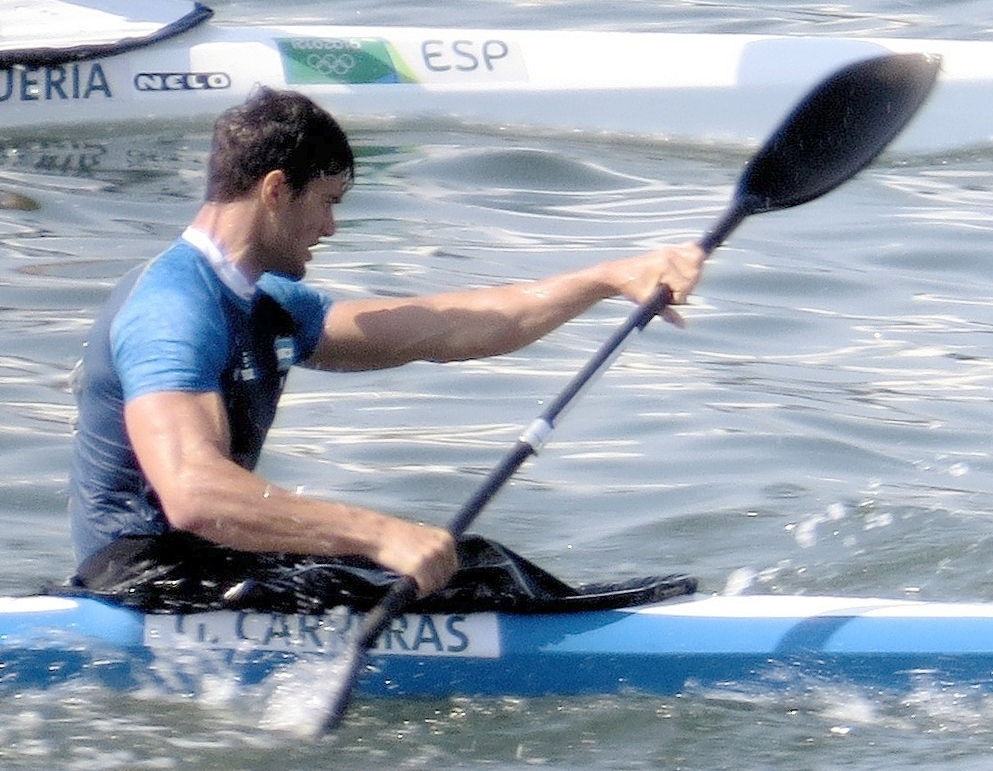
- Carreras at the 2016 Olympics

Personal information
- Born: 26 October 1989 (age 37) Baradero, Buenos Aires, Argentina
- Height: 186 cm (6 ft 1 in)
- Weight: 88 kg (194 lb)

Sport
- Sport: Canoe sprint
- Club: Club Nautico San Pedro
- Coached by: Diego Canepa
Medal record
Representing Argentina
Pan American Games
Gold medal – first place	2019 Lima	K-4 500 m
Gold medal – first place	2023 Santiago	K-4 500m
Silver medal – second place	2015 Toronto	K-2 1000 m
Bronze medal – third place	2015 Toronto	K-4 1000 m
South American Games
Gold medal – first place	2026 Santa Fe	K-2 500 m
Gold medal – first place	2026 Santa Fe	K-4 500 m

Gonzalo Carreras (born 26 October 1989) is an Argentine sprint canoeist who won two medals at the 2015 Pan American games. His four-man team placed 12th in the K-4 1000 m event at the 2016 Summer Olympics.
