= Jesús Valdez =

Dominican baseball player (born 1984)

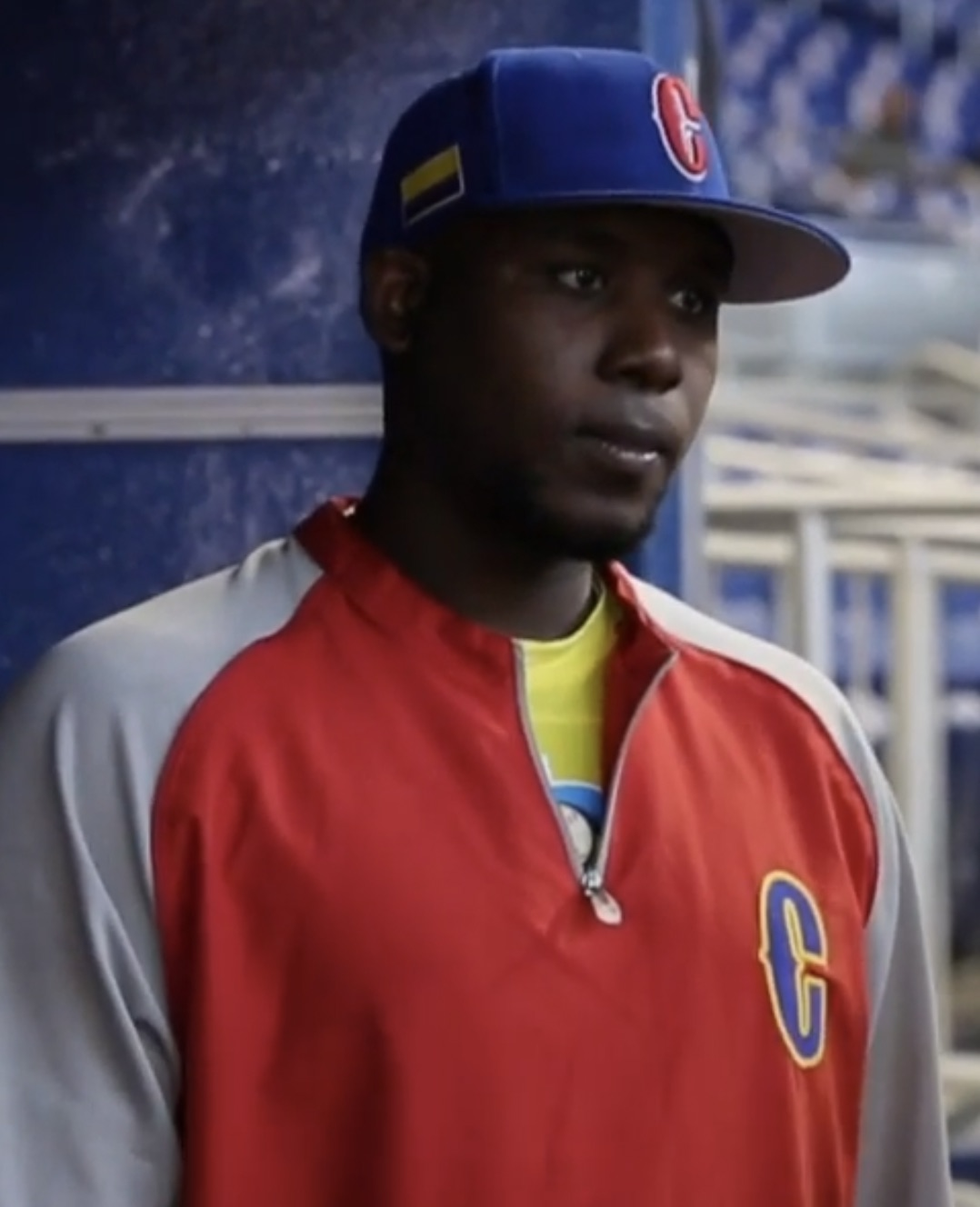
- Valdez at the 2017 World Baseball Classic

El Águila de Veracruz
- Outfielder / Coach
- Born: November 2, 1984 (age 41); San Cristóbal, Dominican Republic
- Bats: Right Throws: Right
- Stats at Baseball Reference

Career highlights and awards
- Mexican League batting champion (2015)

Jesús Alexander Valdez Mejia (Cacao) (born November 2, 1984) is a Dominican former professional baseball outfielder who currently serves as the interim manager for El Águila de Veracruz of the Mexican League. Valdez was selected to the roster for the Colombia national baseball team at the 2017 World Baseball Classic.

== Playing career ==
=== Chicago Cubs ===
Valdez signed with the Chicago Cubs as an international free agent in 2003, and made his professional debut with the rookie-level Arizona League Cubs. He missed the entire 2004 campaign due to an injury. Valdez returned to action in 2005, hitting .244 with five home runs and 38 RBI in 61 games for the Low-A Boise Hawks. He made 130 appearances for the Single-A Peoria Chiefs in 2006, slashing .302/.340/.384 with five home runs and 61 RBI.

Valdez was released by the Cubs organization partway through the 2007 season, having posted a .250/.300/.326 batting line with one home run and 26 RBI in 83 games for the High-A Daytona Cubs. He finished the year with the Rio Grande Valley WhiteWings of United League Baseball, and went 0-for-6 in 3 games.

=== Washington Nationals ===
On January 5, 2008, Valdez signed a minor league contract with the Washington Nationals organization. He split the season between the Low-A Vermont Lake Monsters and Single-A Hagerstown Suns, playing in 51 games and hitting a cumulative .311/.359/.435 with four home runs and 29 RBI. In 2009, Valdez played for the rookie-level Gulf Coast League Nationals and High-A Potomac Nationals. In 94 appearances, he accumulated a .297/.342/.465 batting line with 12 home runs and 60 RBI.

Valdez split the 2011 campaign between the Double-A Harrisburg Senators and Triple-A Syracuse Chiefs, batting a combined .269/.315/.395 with 12 home runs and 76 RBI across 133 appearances. On November 2, 2011, Valdez elected free agency, but re-signed with the Nationals on a new minor league contract on November 7.

Valdez spent 2012 back with Harrisburg and Syracuse, playing in 120 games and hitting .282/.318/.431 with 10 home runs and 60 RBI. He elected free agency following the season on November 2, 2012.

=== Leones de Yucatán ===
On March 27, 2015, Valdez was assigned to the Leones de Yucatán of the Mexican League. He played in 107 games for the club, batting .363/.407/.551 with 17 home runs and 98 RBI. Valdez played in 105 contests for Yucatán during the 2016 season, slashing .308/.365/.518 with 18 home runs and 83 RBI. Valdez made 65 appearances for the Leones in 2017, hitting .368/.424/.557 with eight home runs and 35 RBI.

=== Vaqueros Unión Laguna ===
On July 4, 2017, Valdez was traded to the Vaqueros Unión Laguna. In 30 games with Laguna, he batted .351/.411/.649 with eight home runs and 26 RBI.

=== Leones de Yucatán (second stint) ===
On October 20, 2017, Valdez was traded back to the Leones de Yucatán. In 53 games for the Leones, he slashed .364/.418/.588 with eight home runs and 42 RBI. Valdez was released by Yucatán on July 3, 2018.

=== Toros de Tijuana ===
On April 4, 2019, Valdez signed with the Toros de Tijuana. In 103 games for the Toros, he batted .315/.359/.532 with 19 home runs and 59 RBI. Valdez did not play in a game in 2020 due to the cancellation of the Mexican League season because of the COVID-19 pandemic.

=== El Águila de Veracruz ===
On February 12, 2021, Valdez's rights were secured by El Águila de Veracruz of the Mexican League, and he later signed with them for the 2021 season.

In 57 games for Veracruz, Valdez batted .235/.294/.345 with five home runs and 28 RBI. On December 2, 2024, Valdez was released by the team.

== Coaching career ==
On March 24, 2025, Valdez was hired to serve as the assistant hitting coach for El Águila de Veracruz of the Mexican League. On May 9, following the firing of manager Nomar Rojas, Valdez was named interim manager alongside Enrique Sánchez.

== Personal life ==
Valdez's older brother, Merkin, played in MLB from 2004 to 2011.
