= Edson Silva (canoeist) =

Brazilian canoeist

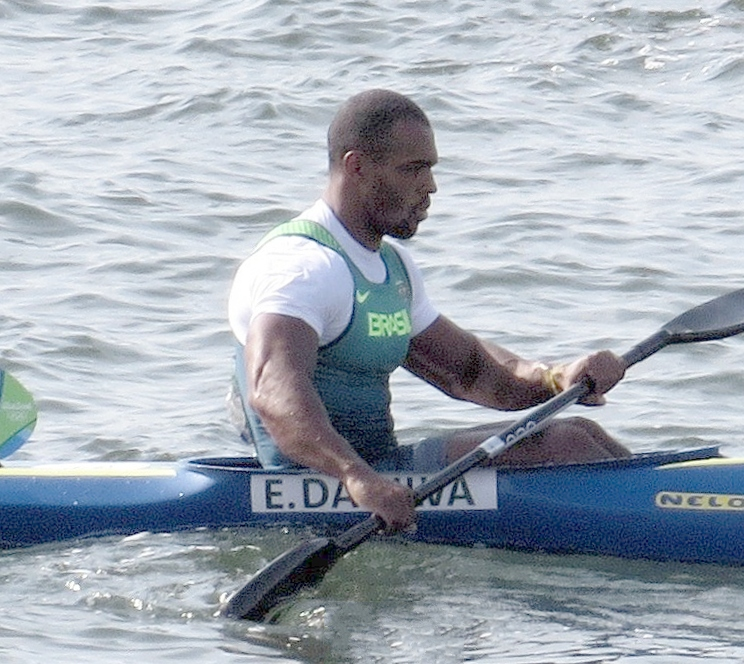
- Silva at the 2016 Olympics

Personal information
- Full name: Edson Isaías Freitas da Silva
- Born: 25 March 1982 (age 44) Porto Alegre, Brazil
- Height: 170 cm (5 ft 7 in)
- Weight: 83 kg (183 lb)

Sport
- Sport: Canoe sprint
- Club: Guahyba Associacao de Canoagem
- Coached by: Nilvion Schmitt (club); Rui Fernandes (national)
Medal record
Men's canoe sprint
Representing Brazil
Pan American Games
Gold medal – first place	2007 Rio de Janeiro	K4 1000 m
Silver medal – second place	2015 Toronto	K1 200 m
Bronze medal – third place	2015 Toronto	K2 200 m
South American Games
Gold medal – first place	2010 Medellín	K–4 200 m
Silver medal – second place	2010 Medellín	K–4 500 m
Silver medal – second place	2010 Medellín	K–4 1000 m

Edson Isaías Freitas da Silva (born 25 March 1982) is a Brazilian canoeist who won a gold, a silver and a bronze medal in different events at the Pan American Games in 2007 and 2015. He competed in the K-1 200 metres and K-2 200 metres events at the 2016 Summer Olympics, but failed to reach the finals.
