= Pablo de Torres (canoeist) =

Argentine kayaker

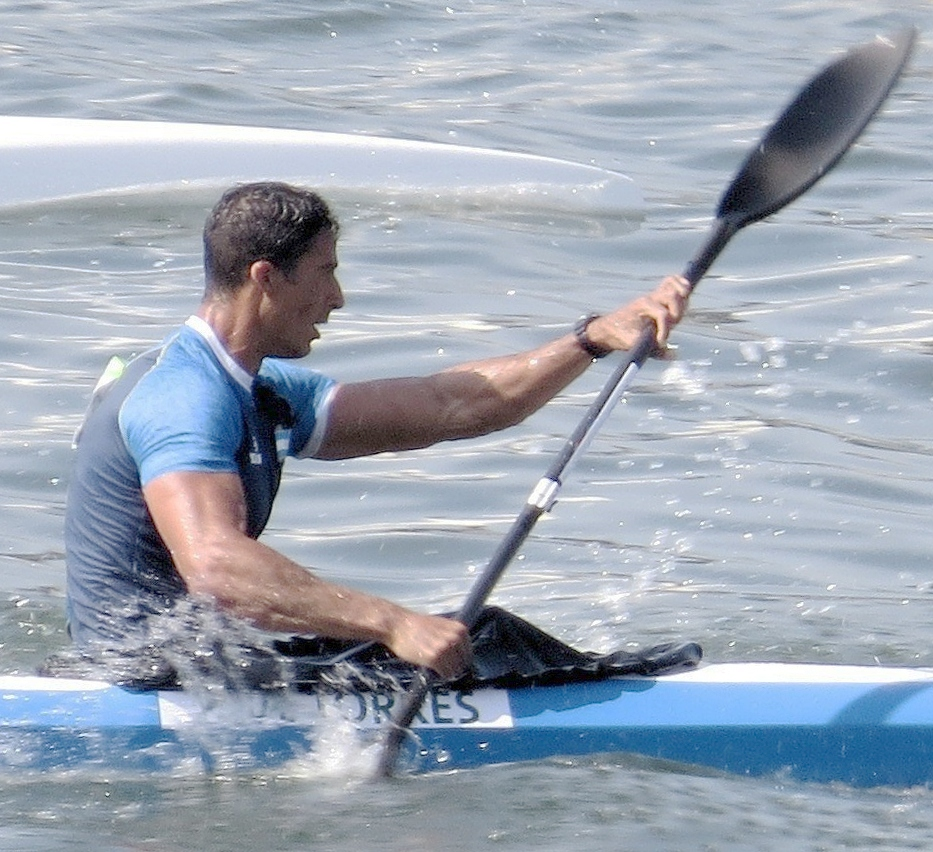
- Torres at the 2016 Olympics

Personal information
- Born: 14 April 1984 (age 42)
- Height: 190 cm (6 ft 3 in)
- Weight: 86 kg (190 lb)

Sport
- Sport: Canoe sprint
- Club: Club San Fernando
- Coached by: Diego Canepa
Medal record
Representing Argentina
Pan American Games
Silver medal – second place	2007 Rio de Janeiro	K-2 1000 m
Bronze medal – third place	2007 Rio de Janeiro	K-2 500 m
Bronze medal – third place	2011 Guadalajara	K-2 1000 m
Silver medal – second place	2015 Toronto	K-2 1000 m
Bronze medal – third place	2015 Toronto	K-4 1000 m
South American Games
Gold medal – first place	2010 Medellín	K-4 1000 m
Silver medal – second place	2010 Medellín	K-2 500 m

Pablo de Torres (born 14 April 1984) is an Argentinean sprint canoer. Between 2007 and 2015 he won five medals at the Pan American Games in two-man (K-2) and four man (K-4) events. He competed in the K-4 1000 m event at the 2016 Summer Olympics, but failed to reach the final.

Torres has a degree from the University of Buenos Aires and works as an instructor at a kayak school in San Fernando. He has one son.
