= Marcelo D'Ambrosio =

Uruguayan sprint canoer

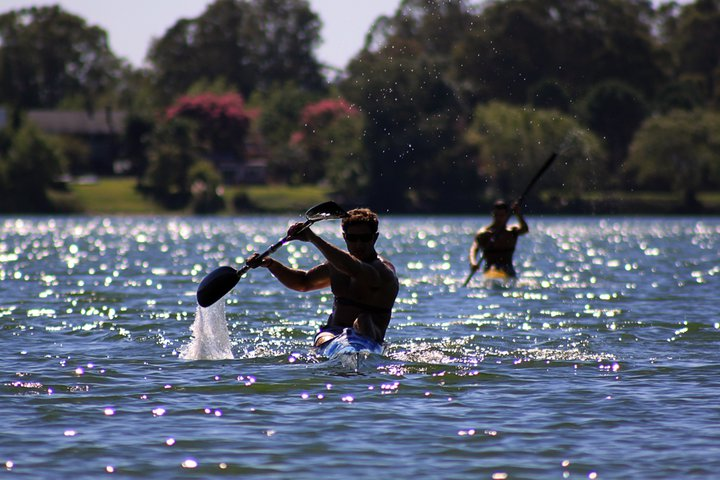

Marcelo D'Ambrosio is a former Uruguayan sprint canoer. He has won the K-1 200, 500 and 1000 meters events of the Uruguay Canoeing National Championships several times. He competed for the last time in 2014. He paddled for Acal Náutico Club and is now a hockey coach for Club Náutico in Uruguay.
