= Reinier Torres =

Cuban sprint canoer (born 1990)

Reiner Torres
Personal information
- Born: February 15, 1990 (age 36)

Sport
- Country: Cuba
- Sport: Canoe sprint
Medal record
Men's canoe sprint
World Championships
Bronze medal – third place	2009 Dartmouth	K-2 1000 m

Reiner Torres is a Cuban sprint canoer who has competed since the late 2000s. He won a bronze medal in the K-2 1000 m event at the 2009 ICF Canoe Sprint World Championships in Dartmouth.
