= Welland International Flatwater Centre =

Canadian water sports facility

- Welland Pan Am Flatwater Centre
- Interactive map of Welland International Flatwater Centre
- Location: 16 Townline Tunnel Road (Highway 58A) at Canal Bank Street, Welland, Ontario
- Coordinates: 42°57′50.1″N 79°15′18.3″W
- Capacity: 500 (1,500 with temporary seating)

Construction
- Opened: July 10th, 2013
- Renovated: 2012-2013

Tenants
- 2013 ICF Junior and U23 Canoe Sprint World Championships; 2015 Pan American Games; 2015 IDBF World Dragon Boat Racing Championships; 2018 ICF Canoe Polo World Championships

The Welland International Flatwater Centre is a current canoeing, kayaking and rowing facility in Welland, Ontario, Canada and was used for the 2013 ICF Junior and U23 Canoe Sprint World Championships and the 2015 Pan American Games. The facility was renovated in 2013, before the U23 championships began.

== Renovations ==
For the Championships and the Pan American Games, improvements to the venue included widening of the canal to bring the venue up to conditions and meet international standards, and also included the addition of buildings along the course. The facility's improvements cost about $10 million Canadian dollars.

The facility has hosted many competitions in many sports among them canoeing, open water swimming and dragon boat racing. After the games the facility reverted to a public use canal.

The facility was the host site for the 2018 Canoe Polo World Championships.

== In popular culture ==
The Welland International Flatwater Centre was featured on Season 9, Episode 6 of The Amazing Race Canada. Teams had to row a double scull along a 200-metre (660 ft) course on the Welland Canal within two minutes in order to receive their next clue from local rower, Rhonda Chopin. The episode aired August 15, 2023.

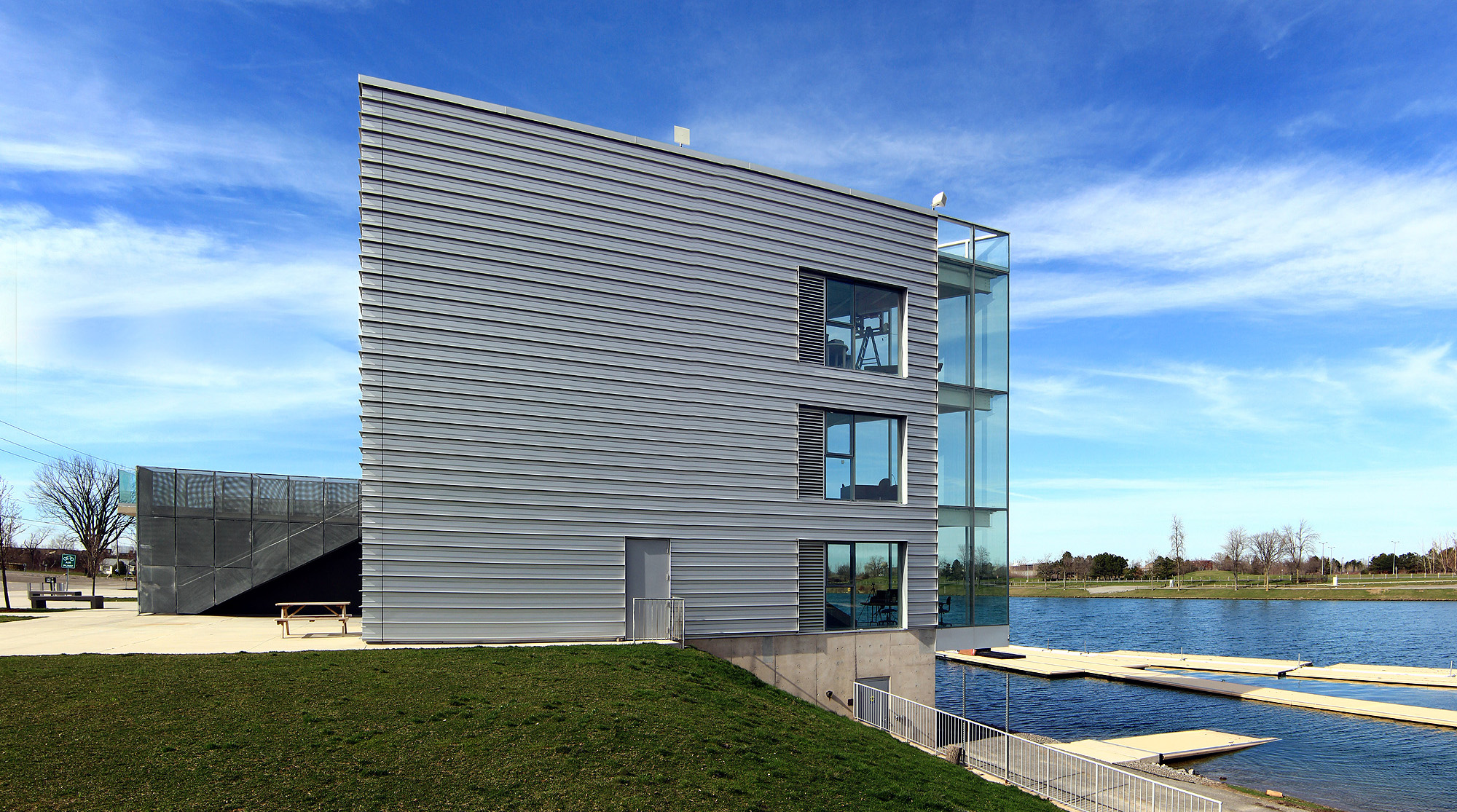
Welland International Flatwater Centre

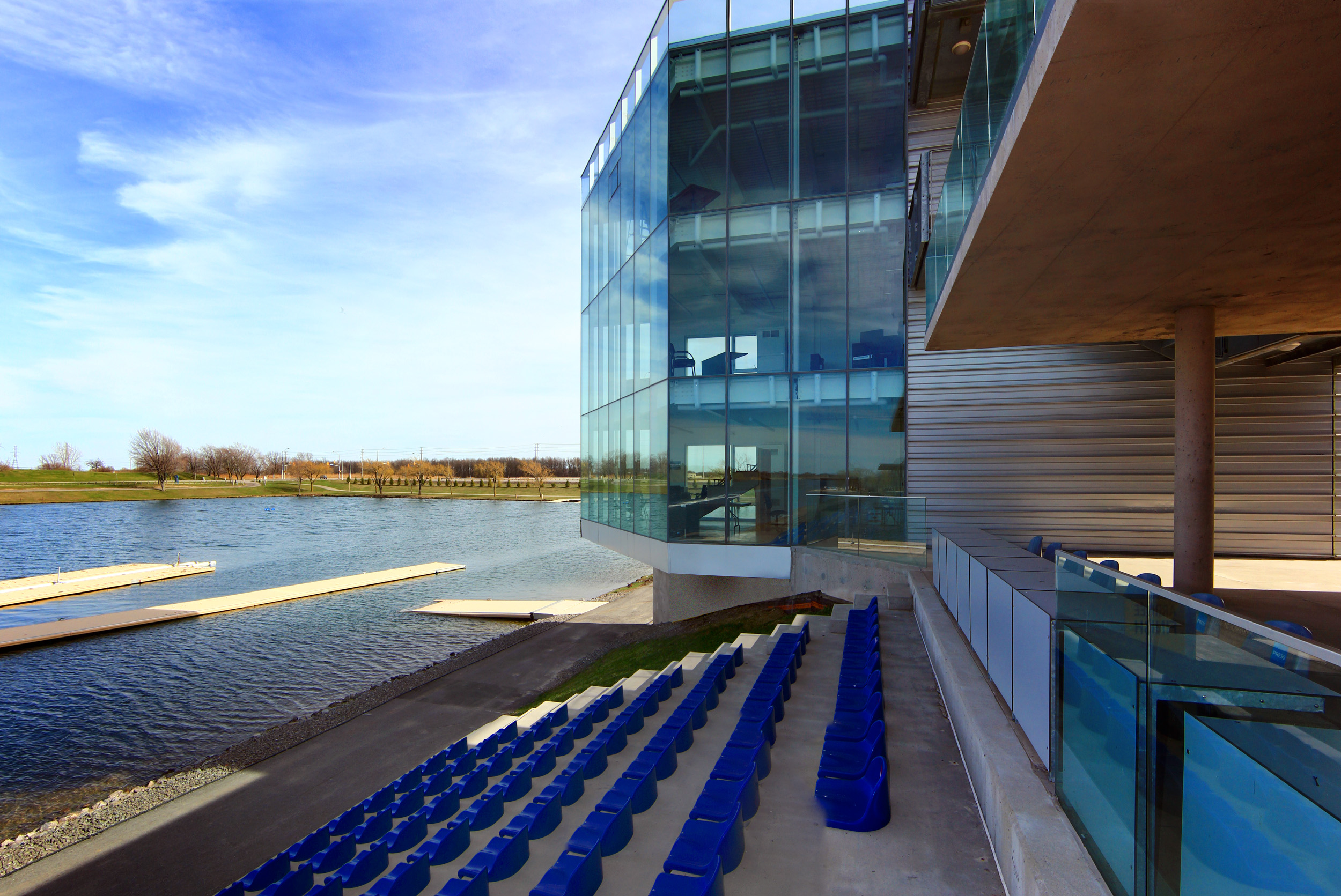
Welland International Flatwater Centre

== See also ==
- Venues of the 2015 Pan American and Parapan American Games
