= Gabriel Rodríguez (canoeist) =

Venezuelan canoeist (born 1979)

Personal information
- Born: August 7, 1979 (age 46) Valencia, Venezuela

Sport
- Sport: Canoeing
Medal record
Men's canoe sprint
Representing Venezuela
Pan American Games
Bronze medal – third place	2007 Rio de Janeiro	K-2 1000 m
Central American and Caribbean Games
Gold medal – first place	2002 San Salvador	K-2 500 m
Gold medal – first place	2002 San Salvador	K-2 1000 m
Gold medal – first place	2002 San Salvador	K-4 500m
Gold medal – first place	2006 Cartagena	K-2 500 m
Bronze medal – third place	2006 Cartagena	K-4 1000 m
South American Games
Bronze medal – third place	2010 Medellin	K-2 200 m
Bronze medal – third place	2010 Medellin	K-2 500 m
Bronze medal – third place	2010 Medellin	K-4 200 m
Bronze medal – third place	2010 Medellin	K-4 500 m
Bronze medal – third place	2010 Medellin	K-4 1000 m

Gabriel Leonardo Rodríguez Pérez (born August 7, 1979) is a Venezuelan sprint canoer. He competed in the late 2000s. At the 2008 Summer Olympics in Beijing, he was eliminated in the semifinals of both the K-2 500 m and the K-2 1000 m events.
