= 2019 ICF Canoe Sprint World Championships – Women's K-4 500 metres =

Women's K-4 500 metres at the 2019 ICF Canoe Sprint World Championships
- Venue: Olympic Centre of Szeged
- Location: Szeged, Hungary
- Dates: 22–25 August
- Competitors: 100 from 25 nations
- Winning time: 1:32.91

Medalists
gold medal	Dóra Bodonyi; Erika Medveczky; Tamara Csipes; Alida Dóra Gazsó	Hungary
silver medal	Maryna Litvinchuk; Volha Khudzenka; Nadzeya Liapeshka; Marharyta Makhneva	Belarus
bronze medal	Karolina Naja; Anna Puławska; Katarzyna Kołodziejczyk; Helena Wiśniewska	Poland

The women's K-4 500 metres competition at the 2019 ICF Canoe Sprint World Championships in Szeged took place at the Olympic Centre of Szeged.

== Schedule ==
The schedule was as follows:

Date	Time	Round
Thursday 22 August 2019	17:39	Heats
Saturday 24 August 2019	17:06	Semifinals
Sunday 25 August 2019	10:44	Final B
Sunday 25 August 2019	13:11	Final A

All times are Central European Summer Time (UTC+2)

== Results ==
=== Heats ===
Heat winners advanced directly to the A final.
The next six fastest boats in each heat advanced to the semifinals.

==== Heat 1 ====
Rank	Kayakers	Country	Time	Notes
1	Maryna Litvinchuk; Volha Khudzenka; Nadzeya Liapeshka; Marharyta Makhneva	Belarus	1:28.58	QA
2	Karolina Naja; Anna Puławska; Katarzyna Kołodziejczyk; Helena Wiśniewska	Poland	1:30.97	QS
3	Michelle Russell; Courtney Stott; Lisa Bissonnette; Natalie Davison	Canada	1:32.52	QS
4	Emma Jørgensen; Julie Funch; Pernille Knudsen; Line Langelund	Denmark	1:32.75	QS
5	Karina Alanís; Maricela Montemayor; Brenda Gutiérrez; Beatriz Briones	Mexico	1:32.84	QS
6	Teresa Portela; Joana Vasconcelos; Francisca Laia; Francisca Carvalho	Portugal	1:34.49	QS
7	Asumi Ōmura; Hideka Tatara; Ayame Hara; Yuka Ono	Japan	1:34.85	QS
8	Sabrina Ameghino; Magdalena Garro; Brenda Rojas; Micaela Maslein	Argentina	1:35.07	
9	Kaitlyn McElroy; Samantha Barlow; Renae Jackson; Alina Urs	United States	1:40.74	

==== Heat 2 ====
Rank	Kayakers	Country	Time	Notes
1	Dóra Bodonyi; Erika Medveczky; Tamara Csipes; Alida Dóra Gazsó	Hungary	1:29.06	QA
2	Tina Dietze; Franziska John; Sabrina Hering-Pradler; Caroline Arft	Germany	1:31.23	QS
3	Alyce Burnett; Jo Brigden-Jones; Jaime Roberts; Alyssa Bull	Australia	1:31.75	QS
4	Inna Hryshchun; Mariia Kichasova-Skoryk; Mariya Povkh; Anastasiia Todorova	Ukraine	1:32.62	QS
5	Angela Hannah; Hannah Brown; Deborah Kerr; Emily Lewis	Great Britain	1:33.69	QS
6	Nikolina Moldovan; Milica Starović; Kristina Bedeč; Marija Dostanić	Serbia	1:34.59	QS
7	Anna Kožíšková; Eliška Betlachová; Anežka Paloudová; Štěpánka Sobíšková	Czech Republic	1:35.75	QS
8	Chou Ju-chuan; Liu Hui-chi; Tsai An-chi; Chen Hsin-shuang	Chinese Taipei	1:42.19	

==== Heat 3 ====
Rank	Kayakers	Country	Time	Notes
1	Lisa Carrington; Aimee Fisher; Caitlin Ryan; Kayla Imrie	New Zealand	1:29.00	QA
2	Sarah Guyot; Léa Jamelot; Sarah Troël; Manon Hostens	France	1:31.62	QS
3	Ma Qing; Huang Jieyi; Zhou Yu; Li Dongyin	China	1:32.14	QS
4	Anastasia Panchenko; Kira Stepanova; Kristina Kovnir; Anastasiia Dolgova	Russia	1:33.38	QS
5	Florida Ciută; Mălina Trifescu; Georgiana Manofu-Vucea; Roxana Ciur	Romania	1:34.93	QS
6	Isabel Contreras; Sara Ouzande; Begoña Lazkano; Natalia García	Spain	1:35.06	QS
7	Moa Wikberg; Karin Johansson; Melina Andersson; Julia Lagerstam	Sweden	1:35.36	QS
8	Kristiane Spikkeland; Anna Sletsjøe; Kristine Amundsen; Maria Virik	Norway	1:37.50	

=== Semifinals ===
Qualification was as follows:

The fastest three boats in each semi advanced to the A final.
The next four fastest boats in each semi, plus the fastest remaining boat advanced to the B final.

==== Semifinal 1 ====
Rank	Kayakers	Country	Time	Notes
1	Karolina Naja; Anna Puławska; Katarzyna Kołodziejczyk; Helena Wiśniewska	Poland	1:31.20	QA
2	Anastasia Panchenko; Kira Stepanova; Kristina Kovnir; Anastasiia Dolgova	Russia	1:31.86	QA
3	Alyce Burnett; Jo Brigden-Jones; Jaime Roberts; Alyssa Bull	Australia	1:32.12	QA
4	Ma Qing; Huang Jieyi; Zhou Yu; Li Dongyin	China	1:32.46	QB
5	Isabel Contreras; Sara Ouzande; Begoña Lazkano; Natalia García	Spain	1:33.81	QB
6	Angela Hannah; Hannah Brown; Deborah Kerr; Emily Lewis	Great Britain	1:35.15	QB
7	Emma Jørgensen; Julie Funch; Pernille Knudsen; Line Langelund	Denmark	1:35.44	QB
8	Anna Kožíšková; Eliška Betlachová; Anežka Paloudová; Štěpánka Sobíšková	Czech Republic	1:36.74	qB
9	Teresa Portela; Joana Vasconcelos; Francisca Laia; Francisca Carvalho	Portugal	1:36.82	

==== Semifinal 2 ====
Rank	Canoeists	Country	Time	Notes
1	Inna Hryshchun; Mariia Kichasova-Skoryk; Mariya Povkh; Anastasiia Todorova	Ukraine	1:31.45	QA
2	Sarah Guyot; Léa Jamelot; Sarah Troël; Manon Hostens	France	1:32.30	QA
3	Tina Dietze; Franziska John; Sabrina Hering-Pradler; Caroline Arft	Germany	1:32.52	QA
4	Michelle Russell; Courtney Stott; Lisa Bissonnette; Natalie Davison	Canada	1:35.11	QB
5	Nikolina Moldovan; Milica Starović; Kristina Bedeč; Marija Dostanić	Serbia	1:35.22	QB
6	Asumi Ōmura; Hideka Tatara; Ayame Hara; Yuka Ono	Japan	1:36.34	QB
7	Karina Alanís; Maricela Montemayor; Brenda Gutiérrez; Beatriz Briones	Mexico	1:36.81	QB
8	Moa Wikberg; Karin Johansson; Melina Andersson; Julia Lagerstam	Sweden	1:36.86	
9	Florida Ciută; Mălina Trifescu; Georgiana Manofu-Vucea; Roxana Ciur	Romania	1:39.09	

=== Finals ===
==== Final B ====
Competitors in this final raced for positions 10 to 18.

Rank	Kayakers	Country	Time
1	Ma Qing; Huang Jieyi; Zhou Yu; Li Dongyin	China	1:37.98
2	Emma Jørgensen; Julie Funch; Pernille Knudsen; Line Langelund	Denmark	1:38.63
3	Michelle Russell; Courtney Stott; Lisa Bissonnette; Natalie Davison	Canada	1:40.29
4	Angela Hannah; Hannah Brown; Deborah Kerr; Emily Lewis	Great Britain	1:40.56
5	Asumi Ōmura; Hideka Tatara; Ayame Hara; Yuka Ono	Japan	1:41.03
6	Isabel Contreras; Sara Ouzande; Begoña Lazkano; Natalia García	Spain	1:41.71
7	Anna Kožíšková; Eliška Betlachová; Anežka Paloudová; Štěpánka Sobíšková	Czech Republic	1:43.11
8	Karina Alanís; Maricela Montemayor; Brenda Gutiérrez; Beatriz Briones	Mexico	1:43.23
9	Nikolina Moldovan; Milica Starović; Kristina Bedeč; Marija Dostanić	Serbia	1:44.79

==== Final A ====
Competitors raced for positions 1 to 9, with medals going to the top three.

Rank	Kayakers	Country	Time
1st place, gold medalist(s)	Dóra Bodonyi; Erika Medveczky; Tamara Csipes; Alida Dóra Gazsó	Hungary	1:32.91
2nd place, silver medalist(s)	Maryna Litvinchuk; Volha Khudzenka; Nadzeya Liapeshka; Marharyta Makhneva	Belarus	1:33.69
3rd place, bronze medalist(s)	Karolina Naja; Anna Puławska; Katarzyna Kołodziejczyk; Helena Wiśniewska	Poland	1:34.77
4	Lisa Carrington; Aimee Fisher; Caitlin Ryan; Kayla Imrie	New Zealand	1:35.35
5	Sarah Guyot; Léa Jamelot; Sarah Troël; Manon Hostens	France	1:37.08
6	Tina Dietze; Franziska John; Sabrina Hering-Pradler; Caroline Arft	Germany	1:37.10
7	Alyce Burnett; Jo Brigden-Jones; Jaime Roberts; Alyssa Bull	Australia	1:37.29
8	Inna Hryshchun; Mariia Kichasova-Skoryk; Mariya Povkh; Anastasiia Todorova	Ukraine	1:37.69
9	Anastasia Panchenko; Kira Stepanova; Kristina Kovnir; Anastasiia Dolgova	Russia	1:38.59
