= Canoeing at the 2020 Summer Olympics – Women's K-4 500 metres =

Olympic canoeing event

Women's K-4 500 metres at the Games of the XXXII Olympiad
- Canoeing pictogram
- Venue: Sea Forest Waterway
- Dates: 6 August 2021 (heats); 7 August 2021 (semifinal & final)
- Competitors: 48 (12 boats) from 12 nations
- Winning time: 1:35.463

Medalists
1st place, gold medalist(s)		Danuta Kozák; Tamara Csipes; Anna Kárász; Dóra Bodonyi	Hungary
2nd place, silver medalist(s)		Marharyta Makhneva; Nadzeya Papok; Volha Khudzenka; Maryna Litvinchuk	Belarus
3rd place, bronze medalist(s)		Karolina Naja; Anna Puławska; Justyna Iskrzycka; Helena Wiśniewska	Poland

The women's K-4 500 metres sprint canoeing event at the 2020 Summer Olympics took place on 6 and 7 August 2021 at the Sea Forest Waterway. 48 canoeists (12 boats of 4) from 10 nations competed.

== Background ==
This was the 10th appearance of the event, having appeared at every Summer Olympics since 1984.

The reigning World Champions were Dóra Bodonyi, Erika Medveczky, Tamara Csipes, and Alida Dóra Gazsó of Hungary. The 2016 Olympic champions were also from Hungary: Gabriella Szabó, Danuta Kozák, Csipes, and Krisztina Fazekas.

== Qualification ==
A National Olympic Committee (NOC) could qualify one place in the event. A total of 10 qualification places were available, all awarded through the 2019 ICF Canoe Sprint World Championships. There were required to be boats from 4 continents qualified. Thus, the top 7 at the World Championships were guaranteed to qualify, with the 8th, 9th, and 10th spots potentially being reserved for continental qualifiers. Additional places resulted from reallocation of quota spots when individual canoeists were in multiple classes of qualifying boats at the World Championships (10 spots were available, allowing the ROC and Denmark boats to qualify, but were not sufficient to qualify Great Britain).

Qualifying places were awarded to the NOC, not to the individual canoeist who earned the place.

The World Championships places were allocated as follows:

Rank	Kayaker	Nation	Qualification	Selected competitors
1	Dóra Bodonyi; Erika Medveczky; Tamara Csipes; Alida Dóra Gazsó	Hungary	Quota #1 (Continent #1)	
2	Maryna Litvinchuk; Volha Khudzenka; Nadzeya Liapeshka; Marharyta Makhneva	Belarus	Quota #2	
3	Karolina Naja; Anna Puławska; Katarzyna Kołodziejczyk; Helena Wiśniewska	Poland	Quota #3	
4	Lisa Carrington; Aimee Fisher; Caitlin Regal; Kayla Imrie	New Zealand	Quota #4 (Continent #2)	
5	Sarah Guyot; Léa Jamelot; Sarah Troël; Manon Hostens	France	Quota #5	
6	Tina Dietze; Franziska John; Sabrina Hering-Pradler; Caroline Arft	Germany	Quota #6	
7	Alyce Burnett; Jo Brigden-Jones; Jaime Roberts; Alyssa Bull	Australia	Quota #7	
8	Inna Hryshchun; Mariia Kichasova-Skoryk; Mariya Povkh; Anastasiia Todorova	Ukraine	Quota #8	
9	Anastasia Panchenko; Kira Stepanova; Kristina Kovnir; Anastasiia Dolgova	ROC	4 reallocated places	
10	Ma Qing; Huang Jieyi; Zhou Yu; Li Dongyin	China	Quota #9 (Continent #3)	
11	Emma Jørgensen; Julie Funch; Pernille Knudsen; Line Langelund	Denmark	3 reallocated places	
12	Michelle Russell; Courtney Stott; Lisa Bissonnette; Natalie Davison	Canada	Quota #10 (Continent #4)	
13	Angela Hannah; Hannah Brown; Deborah Kerr; Emily Lewis	Great Britain	Not qualified; 3 of 4 places available	—

== Competition format ==
Sprint canoeing uses a four-round format for events with 12 boats, with heats, quarterfinals semifinals, and finals. The specifics of the progression format depend on the number of boats ultimately entered.

- Heats: 2 heats of 6 boats each. The top 2 in each heat (4 boats total) advance directly to the semifinals. The remaining 8 boats compete in the quarterfinal.
- Quarterfinal: 1 heat of 8 boats. The top 6 advance to the semifinals. The remaining 2 boats compete in Final B, out of medal contention.
- Semifinals: 2 heats of 5 boats each. The top 4 in each heat (8 boats total) advance to Final A; the remaining 2 boats compete in Final B, out of medal contention.
- Final: 2 heats. Final A has the top 8 boats, awarding the medals and 4th through 8th place. Final B has the remaining 4 boats, ranking them 9th through 12th.

The course is a flatwater course 9 metres wide. The name of the event describes the particular format within sprint canoeing. The "K" format means a kayak, with the canoeist sitting, using a double-bladed paddle to paddle, and steering with a foot-operated rudder (as opposed to a canoe, with a kneeling canoeist, single-bladed paddle, and no rudder). The "4" is the number of canoeists in each boat. The "500 metres" is the distance of each race.

== Schedule ==
The event was held over two consecutive days, with two rounds per day. All sessions started at 9:30 a.m. local time, though there are multiple events with races in each session.

Legend
H	Heats	¼	Quarter-finals	½	Semi-finals	F	Final

Sprint
Event↓/Date →	Mon 2	Tue 3	Wed 4	Thu 5	Fri 6	Sat 7	
Women's K-4 500 m					H	½	F

== Canoers per team ==
Number	Rowers	Nation
1	Jaime Roberts - Jo Brigden-Jones - Shannon Reynolds - Catherine McArthur	Australia
2	Marharyta Makhneva - Nadzeya Papok - Volha Khudzenka - Maryna Litvinchuk	Belarus
3	Andréanne Langlois - Michelle Russell - Alanna Bray-Lougheed - Madeline Schmidt	Canada
4	Li Dongyin - Zhou Yu - Ma Qing - Wang Nan	China
5	Emma Jørgensen - Julie Funch - Sara Milthers - Bolette Nyvang Iversen	Denmark
6	Manon Hostens - Vanina Paoletti - Sarah Guyot - Léa Jamelot	France
7	Sabrina Hering-Pradler - Melanie Gebhardt - Jule Hake - Tina Dietze	Germany
8	Danuta Kozák - Tamara Csipes - Anna Kárász - Dóra Bodonyi	Hungary
9	Lisa Carrington - Alicia Hoskin - Caitlin Regal - Teneale Hatton	New Zealand
10	Karolina Naja - Anna Puławska - Justyna Iskrzycka - Helena Wiśniewska	Poland
11	Natalia Podolskaya - Anastasiia Dolgova - Kira Stepanova - Svetlana Chernigovskaya	ROC
12	Mariia Kichasova-Skoryk - Liudmyla Kuklinovska - Anastasiia Todorova - Mariya Povkh	Ukraine

== Results ==
=== Heats ===
Progression System: 1st-2nd to SF, rest to QF.

==== Heat 1 ====
Rank	Lane	Country	Time	Notes
1	4	Hungary	1:33.335	SF
2	2	New Zealand	1:33.959	SF
3	5	Belarus	1:34.785	QF
4	7	Canada	1:38.971	QF
5	3	France	1:39.032	QF
6	6	Ukraine	1:39.224	QF

==== Heat 2 ====
Rank	Lane	Country	Time	Notes
1	3	Poland	1:33.468	SF
2	4	Germany	1:34.681	SF
3	6	China	1:36.249	QF
4	1	Australia	1:37.407	QF
5	2	Denmark	1:38.453	QF
6	5	ROC	1:39.166	QF

=== Quarterfinal ===
Progression System: 1st-6th to SF, rest to Final B.

Rank	Lane	Country	Time	Notes
1	5	Belarus	1:35.534	SF
2	4	China	1:36.379	SF
3	1	Ukraine	1:36.948	SF
4	7	France	1:37.138	SF
5	6	Australia	1:37.601	SF
6	2	Denmark	1:37.682	SF
7	8	ROC	1:38.372	FB
8	3	Canada	1:38.537	FB

=== Semifinals ===
Progression System: 1st-4th to Final A, rest to Final B.

==== Semifinal 1 ====
Rank	Lane	Country	Time	Notes
1	5	Hungary	1:36.529	FA
2	3	Belarus	1:36.672	FA
3	4	Germany	1:36.737	FA
4	2	Australia	1:38.170	FA
5	6	France	1:38.202	FB

==== Semifinal 2 ====
Rank	Lane	Country	Time	Notes
1	5	Poland	1:36.078	FA
2	4	New Zealand	1:36.293	FA
3	3	China	1:36.697	FA
4	2	Denmark	1:37.386	FA
5	6	Ukraine	1:38.489	FB

=== Finals ===
==== Final A ====
Rank	Lane	Country	Time	Notes
1st place, gold medalist(s)	5	Hungary	1:35.463	
2nd place, silver medalist(s)	3	Belarus	1:36.073	
3rd place, bronze medalist(s)	4	Poland	1:36.445	
4	6	New Zealand	1:37.168	
5	7	Germany	1:37.243	
6	2	China	1:38.121	
7	1	Australia	1:39.797	
8	8	Denmark	1:41.141	

==== Final B ====
Rank	Lane	Country	Time	Notes
9	5	France	1:38.346	
10	4	Ukraine	1:39.276	
11	6	Canada	1:39.946	
12	3	ROC	1:40.951	
