= 2017 ICF Canoe Sprint World Championships – Women's K-4 500 metres =

Women's K-4 500 metres at the 2017 ICF Canoe Sprint World Championships
- Venue: Sportcentrum Račice
- Location: Račice, Czech Republic
- Dates: 25–27 August
- Competitors: 80 from 20 nations
- Winning time: 1:29.784

Medalists
gold medal	Tamara Takács; Erika Medveczky; Krisztina Fazekas-Zur; Ninetta Vad	Hungary
silver medal	Tina Dietze; Franziska Weber; Steffi Kriegerstein; Sabrina Hering	Germany
bronze medal	Aimee Fisher; Caitlin Ryan; Kayla Imrie; Lisa Carrington	New Zealand

The women's K-4 500 metres competition at the 2017 ICF Canoe Sprint World Championships in Račice took place at the Sportcentrum Račice.

== Schedule ==
The schedule was as follows:

Date	Time	Round
Friday 25 August 2017	12:14	Heats
Saturday 26 August 2017	17:07	Semifinals
Sunday 27 August 2017	09:31	Final B
Sunday 27 August 2017	11:47	Final A

All times are Central European Summer Time (UTC+2)

== Results ==
=== Heats ===
Heat winners advanced directly to the A final. The next six fastest boats in each heat advanced to the semifinals.

==== Heat 1 ====
Rank	Kayakers	Country	Time	Notes
1	Tamara Takács; Erika Medveczky; Krisztina Fazekas-Zur; Ninetta Vad	Hungary	1:31.961	QA
2	Sarah Guyot; Manon Hostens; Sarah Troël; Léa Jamelot	France	1:33.084	QS
3	Mariia Kichasova; Mariya Povkh; Anastasiia Todorova; Inna Hryshchun	Ukraine	1:33.361	QS
4	Arina Anoshkina; Varvara Baranova; Svetlana Chernigovskaya; Kira Stepanova	Russia	1:36.711	QS
5	María Magdalena Garro; Brenda Rojas; Martina Isequilla; Micaela Maslein	Argentina	1:39.723	QS
6	Kseniya Kalinina; Natalya Kazantseva; Kseniya Kochnev; Yulia Borzova	Uzbekistan	1:39.867	QS
7	Soh Sze Ying; Geraldine Lee; Stephenie Chen Jiexian; Sarah Chen Jiemei	Singapore	1:40.461	QS

==== Heat 2 ====
Rank	Kayakers	Country	Time	Notes
1	Aimee Fisher; Caitlin Ryan; Kayla Imrie; Lisa Carrington	New Zealand	1:30.439	QA
2	Tina Dietze; Franziska Weber; Steffi Kriegerstein; Sabrina Hering	Germany	1:33.078	QS
3	Joana Vasconcelos; Francisca Laia; Teresa Portela; Márcia Aldeias	Portugal	1:34.278	QS
4	Nikolina Moldovan; Milica Starović; Kristina Bedeč; Olivera Moldovan	Serbia	1:35.578	QS
5	Mette Gravesen; Julie Funch; Ida Villumsen; Pernille Knudsen	Denmark	1:36.345	QS
6	Courtney Stott; Lisa Bissonnette; Alanna Bray-Lougheed; Natalie Davison	Canada	1:36.478	QS
7	Choi Min-ji; Lee Sun-ja; Kim Guk-joo; Yeom Inhwa	South Korea	1:42.162	QS

==== Heat 3 ====
Rank	Kayakers	Country	Time	Notes
1	Dominika Włodarczyk; Anna Puławska; Beata Mikołajczyk; Katarzyna Kołodziejczyk	Poland	1:32.589	QA
2	Sara Ouzande; Alicia Heredia; Isabel Contreras; Begoña Lazkano	Spain	1:34.817	QS
3	Emily Lewis; Deborah Kerr; Rebeka Simon; Amy Turner	Great Britain	1:35.195	QS
4	Mălina Trifescu; Irina Lauric; Florida Ciută; Florentina Caminescu	Romania	1:39.195	QS
5	Eliška Betlachová; Jana Krpatova; Kateřina Slivanská; Lucie Krpatova	Czech Republic	1:39.373	QS
6	Ragina Kiro; Sandhya Kispotta; Veerpal Kaur; Nanao Devi Ahongshangbam	India	1:55.128	QS

=== Semifinals ===
Qualification was as follows:

The fastest three boats in each semi advanced to the A final.
The next four fastest boats in each semi, plus the fastest remaining boat advanced to the B final.

==== Semifinal 1 ====
Rank	Kayakers	Country	Time	Notes
1	Mariia Kichasova; Mariya Povkh; Anastasiia Todorova; Inna Hryshchun	Ukraine	1:32.917	QA
2	Nikolina Moldovan; Milica Starović; Kristina Bedeč; Olivera Moldovan	Serbia	1:33.567	QA
3	Sara Ouzande; Alicia Heredia; Isabel Contreras; Begoña Lazkano	Spain	1:34.645	QA
4	Joana Vasconcelos; Francisca Laia; Teresa Portela; Márcia Aldeias	Portugal	1:35.939	QB
5	Courtney Stott; Lisa Bissonnette; Alanna Bray-Lougheed; Natalie Davison	Canada	1:37.256	QB
6	María Magdalena Garro; Brenda Rojas; Martina Isequilla; Micaela Maslein	Argentina	1:39.400	QB
7	Kseniya Kalinina; Natalya Kazantseva; Kseniya Kochnev; Yulia Borzova	Uzbekistan	1:39.956	QB
8	Mălina Trifescu; Irina Lauric; Florida Ciută; Florentina Caminescu	Romania	1:42.017	qB

==== Semifinal 2 ====
Rank	Kayakers	Country	Time	Notes
1	Sarah Guyot; Manon Hostens; Sarah Troël; Léa Jamelot	France	1:33.540	QA
2	Tina Dietze; Franziska Weber; Steffi Kriegerstein; Sabrina Hering	Germany	1:34.295	QA
3	Emily Lewis; Deborah Kerr; Rebeka Simon; Amy Turner	Great Britain	1:36.090	QA
4	Arina Anoshkina; Varvara Baranova; Svetlana Chernigovskaya; Kira Stepanova	Russia	1:36.206	QB
5	Mette Gravesen; Julie Funch; Ida Villumsen; Pernille Knudsen	Denmark	1:37.362	QB
6	Choi Min-ji; Lee Sun-ja; Kim Guk-joo; Yeom Inhwa	South Korea	1:40.167	QB
7	Eliška Betlachová; Jana Krpatova; Kateřina Slivanská; Lucie Krpatova	Czech Republic	1:42.006	QB
8	Soh Sze Ying; Geraldine Lee; Stephenie Chen Jiexian; Sarah Chen Jiemei	Singapore	1:42.212	
9	Ragina Kiro; Sandhya Kispotta; Veerpal Kaur; Nanao Devi Ahongshangbam	India	1:55.317	

=== Finals ===
==== Final B ====
Competitors in this final raced for positions 10 to 18.

Rank	Kayakers	Country	Time
1	Joana Vasconcelos; Francisca Laia; Teresa Portela; Márcia Aldeias	Portugal	1:35.130
2	Courtney Stott; Lisa Bissonnette; Alanna Bray-Lougheed; Natalie Davison	Canada	1:36.230
3	Arina Anoshkina; Varvara Baranova; Svetlana Chernigovskaya; Kira Stepanova	Russia	1:36.780
4	Mette Gravesen; Julie Funch; Ida Villumsen; Pernille Knudsen	Denmark	1:37.252
5	María Magdalena Garro; Brenda Rojas; Martina Isequilla; Micaela Maslein	Argentina	1:39.008
6	Choi Min-ji; Lee Sun-ja; Kim Guk-joo; Yeom Inhwa	South Korea	1:39.597
7	Kseniya Kalinina; Natalya Kazantseva; Kseniya Kochnev; Yulia Borzova	Uzbekistan	1:39.924
8	Mălina Trifescu; Irina Lauric; Florida Ciută; Florentina Caminescu	Romania	1:40.491
9	Eliška Betlachová; Jana Krpatova; Kateřina Slivanská; Lucie Krpatova	Czech Republic	1:42.191

==== Final A ====
Competitors in this final raced for positions 1 to 9, with medals going to the top three.

Rank	Kayakers	Country	Time
1st place, gold medalist(s)	Tamara Takács; Erika Medveczky; Krisztina Fazekas-Zur; Ninetta Vad	Hungary	1:29.784
2nd place, silver medalist(s)	Tina Dietze; Franziska Weber; Steffi Kriegerstein; Sabrina Hering	Germany	1:30.084
3rd place, bronze medalist(s)	Aimee Fisher; Caitlin Ryan; Kayla Imrie; Lisa Carrington	New Zealand	1:30.215
4	Sarah Guyot; Manon Hostens; Sarah Troël; Léa Jamelot	France	1:31.873
5	Mariia Kichasova; Mariya Povkh; Anastasiia Todorova; Inna Hryshchun	Ukraine	1:32.031
6	Dominika Włodarczyk; Anna Puławska; Beata Mikołajczyk; Katarzyna Kołodziejczyk	Poland	1:32.105
7	Nikolina Moldovan; Milica Starović; Kristina Bedeč; Olivera Moldovan	Serbia	1:34.431
8	Sara Ouzande; Alicia Heredia; Isabel Contreras; Begoña Lazkano	Spain	1:35.384
9	Emily Lewis; Deborah Kerr; Rebeka Simon; Amy Turner	Great Britain	1:35.715
