= 2018 ICF Canoe Sprint World Championships – Women's K-4 500 metres =

Canoeing event

Women's K-4 500 metres at the 2018 ICF Canoe Sprint World Championships
- Venue: Centro de Alto Rendimento de Montemor-o-Velho
- Location: Montemor-o-Velho, Portugal
- Dates: 25–26 August
- Competitors: 68 from 17 nations
- Winning time: 1:33.761

Medalists
gold medal	Anna Kárász; Erika Medveczky; Danuta Kozák; Dóra Bodonyi	Hungary
silver medal	Lisa Carrington; Aimee Fisher; Kayla Imrie; Caitlin Ryan	New Zealand
bronze medal	Karolina Naja; Helena Wiśniewska; Anna Puławska; Katarzyna Kolodziejczyk	Poland

The women's K-4 500 metres competition at the 2018 ICF Canoe Sprint World Championships in Montemor-o-Velho took place at the Centro de Alto Rendimento de Montemor-o-Velho.

== Schedule ==
The schedule was as follows:

Date	Time	Round
Saturday 25 August 2018	16:41	Heats
Saturday 25 August 2018	18:06	Semifinal
Sunday 26 August 2018	13:17	Final

All times are Western European Summer Time (UTC+1)

== Results ==
=== Heats ===
The fastest three boats in each heat advanced directly to the final. The next four fastest boats in each heat, plus the fastest remaining boat advanced to the semifinal.

==== Heat 1 ====
Rank	Kayakers	Country	Time	Notes
1	Anna Kárász; Erika Medveczky; Danuta Kozák; Dóra Bodonyi	Hungary	1:37.234	QF
2	Mariya Povkh; Anastasiia Todorova; Mariia Kichasova-Skoryk; Inna Hryshchun	Ukraine	1:37.611	QF
3	Pernille Knudsen; Line Langelund; Julie Funch; Bolette Iversen	Denmark	1:37.734	QF
4	Alina Svita; Nadzeya Liapeshka; Maryna Litvinchuk; Volha Khudzenka	Belarus	1:38.864	QS
5	Manon Hostens; Sarah Troël; Gabrielle Tuleu; Léa Jamelot	France	1:39.874	QS
6	Emily Lewis; Amy Turner; Deborah Kerr; Hannah Brown	Great Britain	1:40.734	QS
7	Irene Burgo; Sofia Campana; Cristina Petracca; Agata Fantini	Italy	1:41.751	QS
8	Teresa Portela; Joana Vasconcelos; Francisca Laia; Francisca Carvalho	Portugal	1:41.988	
9	María Magdalena Garro; Sabrina Ameghino; Brenda Rojas; Micaela Maslein	South Africa	1:44.011	

==== Heat 2 ====
Rank	Kayakers	Country	Time	Notes
1	Lisa Carrington; Aimee Fisher; Kayla Imrie; Caitlin Ryan	New Zealand	1:35.602	QF
2	Franziska Weber; Steffi Kriegerstein; Tina Dietze; Conny Waßmuth	Germany	1:36.195	QF
3	Karolina Naja; Helena Wiśniewska; Anna Puławska; Katarzyna Kolodziejczyk	Poland	1:36.645	QF
4	Kira Stepanova; Vera Sobetova; Svetlana Chernigovskaya; Anastasia Panchenko	Russia	1:37.152	QS
5	Alyssa Bull; Jaime Roberts; Alyce Burnett; Jo Brigden-Jones	Australia	1:39.839	QS
6	Beatriz Fragoza; Brenda Rodríguez; Karina Morales; Maricela Rodríguez	Mexico	1:39.936	QS
7	Courtney Stott; Michelle Russell; Lisa Bissonnette; Madeline Schmidt	Canada	1:40.286	QS
8	Sara Ouzande; Isabel Contreras; Alicia Heredia; Begoña Lazkano	Spain	1:41.842	qS

=== Semifinal ===
The fastest three boats advanced to the final.

Rank	Kayakers	Country	Time	Notes
1	Alyssa Bull; Jaime Roberts; Alyce Burnett; Jo Brigden-Jones	Australia	1:35.266	QF
2	Alina Svita; Nadzeya Liapeshka; Maryna Litvinchuk; Volha Khudzenka	Belarus	1:35.496	QF
3	Courtney Stott; Michelle Russell; Lisa Bissonnette; Madeline Schmidt	Canada	1:36.169	QF
4	Kira Stepanova; Vera Sobetova; Svetlana Chernigovskaya; Anastasia Panchenko	Russia	1:36.486	
5	Manon Hostens; Sarah Troël; Gabrielle Tuleu; Léa Jamelot	France	1:36.999	
6	Emily Lewis; Amy Turner; Deborah Kerr; Hannah Brown	Great Britain	1:38.166	
7	Beatriz Fragoza; Brenda Rodríguez; Karina Morales; Maricela Rodríguez	Mexico	1:39.719	
8	Sara Ouzande; Isabel Contreras; Alicia Heredia; Begoña Lazkano	Spain	1:40.226	
9	Irene Burgo; Sofia Campana; Cristina Petracca; Agata Fantini	Italy	1:42.656	

=== Final ===
Competitors raced for positions 1 to 9, with medals going to the top three.

Rank	Kayakers	Country	Time
1st place, gold medalist(s)	Anna Kárász; Erika Medveczky; Danuta Kozák; Dóra Bodonyi	Hungary	1:33.761
2nd place, silver medalist(s)	Lisa Carrington; Aimee Fisher; Kayla Imrie; Caitlin Ryan	New Zealand	1:33.771
3rd place, bronze medalist(s)	Karolina Naja; Helena Wiśniewska; Anna Puławska; Katarzyna Kolodziejczyk	Poland	1:34.568
4	Alina Svita; Nadzeya Liapeshka; Maryna Litvinchuk; Volha Khudzenka	Belarus	1:34.885
5	Franziska Weber; Steffi Kriegerstein; Tina Dietze; Conny Waßmuth	Germany	1:36.298
6	Mariya Povkh; Anastasiia Todorova; Mariia Kichasova-Skoryk; Inna Hryshchun	Ukraine	1:36.515
7	Alyssa Bull; Jaime Roberts; Alyce Burnett; Jo Brigden-Jones	Australia	1:37.385
8	Pernille Knudsen; Line Langelund; Julie Funch; Bolette Iversen	Denmark	1:39.245
9	Courtney Stott; Michelle Russell; Lisa Bissonnette; Madeline Schmidt	Canada	1:39.645
