= Canoe sprint at the 2015 European Games – Women's K-4 500 metres =

Women's K-4 500 metres at the 2015 European Games
- Venue: Kur Sport and Rowing Centre, Mingachevir
- Date: 14–15 June
- Competitors: 52 from 13 nations
- Winning time: 1:32.417

Medalists
gold medal	Gabriella Szabó; Anna Kárász; Danuta Kozák; Ninetta Vad	Hungary
silver medal	Franziska Weber; Verena Hantl; Conny Waßmuth; Tina Dietze	Germany
bronze medal	Karolina Naja; Ewelina Wojnarowska; Edyta Dzieniszewska-Kierkla; Beata Mikołajczyk	Poland

The women's K-4 500 metres canoe sprint competition at the 2015 European Games in Baku took place between 14 and 15 June at the Kur Sport and Rowing Centre in Mingachevir.

== Schedule ==
The schedule was as follows:

Date	Time	Round
Sunday 14 June 2015	10:00	Heats
Sunday 14 June 2015	17:12	Semifinals
Monday 15 June 2015	10:32	Finals

All times are Azerbaijan Summer Time (UTC+5)

== Results ==
=== Heats ===
The fastest three boats in each heat advanced directly to the final. The next four fastest boats in each heat, plus the fastest remaining boat advanced to the semifinal.

==== Heat 1 ====
Rank	Kayakers	Country	Time	Notes
1	Franziska Weber; Verena Hantl; Conny Waßmuth; Tina Dietze	Germany	1:34.937	QF, GB
2	Lani Belcher; Hayleigh Mason; Angela Hannah; Louisa Sawers	Great Britain	1:35.191	QF
3	Mariia Kichasova; Anastasiia Todorova; Mariya Povkh; Inna Hryshchun	Ukraine	1:35.613	QF
4	Léa Jamelot; Gabrielle Tuleu; Amandine Lhote; Sarah Troël	France	1:37.069	QS
5	Joana Vasconcelos; Beatriz Gomes; Francisca Laia; Helena Rodrigues	Portugal	1:37.910	QS
6	Linnea Stensils; Karin Johansson; Moa Wikberg; Klara Andersson	Sweden	1:38.337	QS
7	Federica Nole; Norma Murabito; Irene Burgo; Sofia Campana	Italy	1:39.840	QS

==== Heat 2 ====
Rank	Kayakers	Country	Time	Notes
1	Gabriella Szabó; Anna Kárász; Danuta Kozák; Ninetta Vad	Hungary	1:33.709	QF, GB
2	Nikolina Moldovan; Dalma Ružičić-Benedek; Milica Starović; Olivera Moldovan	Serbia	1:34.019	QF
3	Karolina Naja; Ewelina Wojnarowska; Edyta Dzieniszewska-Kierkla; Beata Mikołajczyk	Poland	1:34.463	QF
4	Roxana Borha; Iuliana Ţăran; Elena Meroniac; Irina Lauric	Romania	1:35.836	QS
5	Yuliana Salakhova; Kira Stepanova; Elena Aniushina; Svetlana Chernigovskaya	Russia	1:36.757	QS
6	Lucie Matoušková; Anna Kožíšková; Monika Machová; Michaela Mlezivová	Czech Republic	1:39.346	QS

=== Semifinal ===
The fastest three boats advanced to the final.

Rank	Kayakers	Country	Time	Notes
1	Roxana Borha; Iuliana Ţăran; Elena Meroniac; Irina Lauric	Romania	1:30.594	QF, GB
2	Yuliana Salakhova; Kira Stepanova; Elena Aniushina; Svetlana Chernigovskaya	Russia	1:30.969	QF
3	Léa Jamelot; Gabrielle Tuleu; Amandine Lhote; Sarah Troël	France	1:31.596	QF
4	Linnea Stensils; Karin Johansson; Moa Wikberg; Klara Andersson	Sweden	1:31.946	
5	Joana Vasconcelos; Beatriz Gomes; Francisca Laia; Helena Rodrigues	Portugal	1:32.169	
6	Lucie Matoušková; Anna Kožíšková; Monika Machová; Michaela Mlezivová	Czech Republic	1:33.308	
7	Federica Nole; Norma Murabito; Irene Burgo; Sofia Campana	Italy	1:36.004	

=== Final ===
Competitors in this final raced for positions 1 to 9, with medals going to the top three.

Rank	Kayakers	Country	Time
1st place, gold medalist(s)	Gabriella Szabó; Anna Kárász; Danuta Kozák; Ninetta Vad	Hungary	1:32.417
2nd place, silver medalist(s)	Franziska Weber; Verena Hantl; Conny Waßmuth; Tina Dietze	Germany	1:33.312
3rd place, bronze medalist(s)	Karolina Naja; Ewelina Wojnarowska; Edyta Dzieniszewska-Kierkla; Beata Mikołajczyk	Poland	1:33.979
4	Roxana Borha; Iuliana Ţăran; Elena Meroniac; Irina Lauric	Romania	1:34.084
5	Nikolina Moldovan; Dalma Ružičić-Benedek; Milica Starović; Olivera Moldovan	Serbia	1:34.398
6	Mariia Kichasova; Anastasiia Todorova; Mariya Povkh; Inna Hryshchun	Ukraine	1:35.325
7	Yuliana Salakhova; Kira Stepanova; Elena Aniushina; Svetlana Chernigovskaya	Russia	1:35.627
8	Lani Belcher; Hayleigh Mason; Angela Hannah; Louisa Sawers	Great Britain	1:36.439
9	Léa Jamelot; Gabrielle Tuleu; Amandine Lhote; Sarah Troël	France	1:37.825
