= 2017 ICF Canoe Sprint World Championships – Women's K-2 500 metres =

Women's K-2 500 metres at the 2017 ICF Canoe Sprint World Championships
- Venue: Sportcentrum Račice
- Location: Račice, Czech Republic
- Dates: 24–26 August
- Competitors: 50 from 25 nations
- Winning time: 1:38.687

Medalists
gold medal	Caitlin Ryan; Lisa Carrington	New Zealand
silver medal	Tina Dietze; Franziska Weber	Germany
bronze medal	Špela Ponomarenko Janić; Anja Ostermann	Slovenia

The women's K-2 500 metres competition at the 2017 ICF Canoe Sprint World Championships in Račice took place at the Sportcentrum Račice.

== Schedule ==
The schedule was as follows:

Date	Time	Round
Thursday 24 August 2017	11:20	Heats
Thursday 24 August 2017	17:32	Semifinals
Saturday 26 August 2017	10:04	Final B
Saturday 26 August 2017	11:47	Final A

All times are Central European Summer Time (UTC+2)

== Results ==
=== Heats ===
Heat winners advanced directly to the A final. The next six fastest boats in each heat advanced to the semifinals.

==== Heat 1 ====
Rank	Kayakers	Country	Time	Notes
1	Tamara Takács; Ninetta Vad	Hungary	1:42.073	QA
2	Alyssa Bull; Alyce Burnett	Australia	1:45.795	QS
3	Joana Vasconcelos; Francisca Laia	Portugal	1:47.562	QS
4	Susanna Cicali; Francesca Genzo	Italy	1:47.806	QS
5	Line Langelund; Bolette Nyvang	Denmark	1:48.973	QS
6	Karina Alanís; Maricela Montemayor	Mexico	1:49.912	QS
7	Hannah Brown; Angela Hannah	Great Britain	1:51.056	QS
8	Laura Skukauska; Sabine Cirsa	Latvia	1:54.501	
9	Ragina Kiro; Sandhya Kispotta	India	2:07.028	

==== Heat 2 ====
Rank	Kayakers	Country	Time	Notes
1	Špela Ponomarenko Janić; Anja Ostermann	Slovenia	1:43.749	QA
2	Lize Broekx; Hermien Peters	Belgium	1:46.071	QS
3	Moa Wikberg; Karin Johansson	Sweden	1:46.549	QS
4	Arina Anoshkina; Kira Stepanova	Russia	1:48.016	QS
5	Andréanne Langlois; Michelle Russell	Canada	1:48.266	QS
6	Camila Morison; Laia Pelachs	Spain	1:49.027	QS
7	Nikolina Moldovan; Olivera Moldovan	Serbia	1:49.582	QS
8	Stevani Maysche Ibo; Masripah Masripah	Indonesia	1:55.649	

==== Heat 3 ====
Rank	Kayakers	Country	Time	Notes
1	Caitlin Ryan; Lisa Carrington	New Zealand	1:41.371	QA
2	Tina Dietze; Franziska Weber	Germany	1:43.832	QS
3	Mariya Povkh; Liudmyla Kuklinovska	Ukraine	1:44.993	QS
4	Manon Hostens; Sarah Troël	France	1:45.415	QS
5	Anna Puławska; Beata Mikołajczyk	Poland	1:46.977	QS
6	Ana Roxana Lehaci; Viktoria Schwarz	Austria	1:48.677	QS
7	Geraldine Lee; Stephenie Chen Jiexian	Singapore	1:50.277	QS
8	Choi Min-ji; Yeom Inhwa	South Korea	1:52.315	

=== Semifinals ===
Qualification was as follows:

The fastest three boats in each semi advanced to the A final.
The next four fastest boats in each semi, plus the fastest remaining boat advanced to the B final.

==== Semifinal 1 ====
Rank	Kayakers	Country	Time	Notes
1	Tina Dietze; Franziska Weber	Germany	1:42.397	QA
2	Manon Hostens; Sarah Troël	France	1:44.064	QA
3	Moa Wikberg; Karin Johansson	Sweden	1:44.470	QA
4	Joana Vasconcelos; Francisca Laia	Portugal	1:45.797	QB
5	Line Langelund; Bolette Nyvang	Denmark	1:47.264	QB
6	Camila Morison; Laia Pelachs	Spain	1:47.464	QB
7	Arina Anoshkina; Kira Stepanova	Russia	1:48.064	QB
8	Karina Alanís; Maricela Montemayor	Mexico	1:48.670	qB
9	Geraldine Lee; Stephenie Chen Jiexian	Singapore	1:51.431	

==== Semifinal 2 ====
Rank	Kayakers	Country	Time	Notes
1	Mariya Povkh; Liudmyla Kuklinovska	Ukraine	1:43.863	QA
2	Anna Puławska; Beata Mikołajczyk	Poland	1:44.141	QA
3	Alyssa Bull; Alyce Burnett	Australia	1:44.980	QA
4	Nikolina Moldovan; Olivera Moldovan	Serbia	1:45.941	QB
5	Lize Broekx; Hermien Peters	Belgium	1:46.407	QB
6	Ana Roxana Lehaci; Viktoria Schwarz	Austria	1:46.791	QB
7	Andréanne Langlois; Michelle Russell	Canada	1:48.574	QB
8	Hannah Brown; Angela Hannah	Great Britain	1:49.202	
9	Susanna Cicali; Francesca Genzo	Italy	1:49.235	

=== Finals ===
==== Final B ====
Competitors in this final raced for positions 10 to 18.

Rank	Kayakers	Country	Time
1	Lize Broekx; Hermien Peters	Belgium	1:42.429
2	Ana Roxana Lehaci; Viktoria Schwarz	Austria	1:44.118
3	Nikolina Moldovan; Olivera Moldovan	Serbia	1:44.718
4	Andréanne Langlois; Michelle Russell	Canada	1:45.512
5	Joana Vasconcelos; Francisca Laia	Portugal	1:45.762
6	Camila Morison; Laia Pelachs	Spain	1:45.818
7	Line Langelund; Bolette Nyvang	Denmark	1:46.540
8	Arina Anoshkina; Kira Stepanova	Russia	1:46.568
9	Karina Alanís; Maricela Montemayor	Mexico	1:46.873

==== Final A ====
Competitors in this final raced for positions 1 to 9, with medals going to the top three.

Rank	Kayakers	Country	Time
1st place, gold medalist(s)	Caitlin Ryan; Lisa Carrington	New Zealand	1:38.687
2nd place, silver medalist(s)	Tina Dietze; Franziska Weber	Germany	1:40.582
3rd place, bronze medalist(s)	Špela Ponomarenko Janić; Anja Ostermann	Slovenia	1:40.804
4	Mariya Povkh; Liudmyla Kuklinovska	Ukraine	1:41.115
5	Tamara Takács; Ninetta Vad	Hungary	1:41.365
6	Anna Puławska; Beata Mikołajczyk	Poland	1:41.382
7	Alyssa Bull; Alyce Burnett	Australia	1:42.571
8	Moa Wikberg; Karin Johansson	Sweden	1:43.904
9	Manon Hostens; Sarah Troël	France	1:44.637
