= Canoeing at the 2016 Summer Olympics – Women's K-4 500 metres =

Women's canoe sprint K-4 500 metres at the Games of the XXXI Olympiad
- Venue: Lagoa Stadium
- Date: 19–20 August 2016
- Competitors: 56 from 14 nations
- Winning time: 1:34.482

Medalists
| 1st place, gold medalist(s) | | Gabriella Szabó; Danuta Kozák; Tamara Csipes; Krisztina Fazekas | Hungary |
| 2nd place, silver medalist(s) | | Sabrina Hering; Franziska Weber; Steffi Kriegerstein; Tina Dietze | Germany |
| 3rd place, bronze medalist(s) | | Marharyta Makhneva; Nadzeya Liapeshka; Volha Khudzenka; Maryna Litvinchuk | Belarus |

The women's canoe sprint K-4 500 metres at the 2016 Olympic Games in Rio de Janeiro took place between 19 and 20 August at Lagoa Stadium.

The medals were presented by Pál Schmitt, IOC member, Hungary and Cecilia Farias, Board Member of the ICF.

== Competition format ==
The competition comprised heats, semifinals, and a final round.

== Schedule ==
All times are Brasilia Time (UTC-03:00)

| Date | Time | Round |
|---|---|---|
| Friday, 19 August 2016 | 9:37; 10:37 | Heats; Semifinals |
| Saturday, 20 August 2016 | 9:40 | Finals |

== Results ==
=== Heats ===
The first boat from each heat qualified for the final, with the remainder going to the semi-finals.

==== Heat 1 ====
| Rank | Canoer | Country | Time | Notes |
|---|---|---|---|---|
| 1 | Marharyta Makhneva; Nadzeya Liapeshka; Volha Khudzenka; Maryna Litvinchuk | Belarus | 1:30.320 | FA |
| 2 | Marta Walczykiewicz; Edyta Dzieniszewska; Karolina Naja; Beata Mikołajczyk | Poland | 1:33.020 | SF |
| 3 | Jaimee Lovett; Kayla Imrie; Aimee Fisher; Caitlin Ryan | New Zealand | 1:33.782 | SF |
| 4 | Inna Klinova; Irina Podoinikova; Natalya Sergeyeva; Zoya Ananchenko | Kazakhstan | 1:36.127 | SF |
| 5 | Jess Walker; Rachel Cawthorn; Rebii Simon; Louisa Gurski | Great Britain | 1:36.853 | SF |
| 6 | Manon Hostens; Amandine Lhote; Léa Jamelot; Sarah Troel | France | 1:37.038 | SF |
| 7 | Magdalena Garro; Brenda Rojas; Sabrina Ameghino; Alexandra Keresztesi | Argentina | 1:37.645 | SF |

==== Heat 2 ====
| Rank | Canoer | Country | Time | Notes |
|---|---|---|---|---|
| 1 | Gabriella Szabó; Danuta Kozák; Tamara Csipes; Krisztina Fazekas | Hungary | 1:29.497 | FA |
| 2 | Mariya Povkh; Svitlana Akhadova; Anastasia Todorova; Inna Hryshchun | Ukraine | 1:31.727 | SF |
| 3 | Sabrina Hering; Franziska Weber; Steffi Kriegerstein; Tina Dietze | Germany | 1:33.185 | SF |
| 4 | Andréanne Langlois; Émilie Fournel; Genevieve Orton; Kathleen Fraser | Canada | 1:34.269 | SF |
| 5 | Emma Jørgensen; Amalie Thomsen; Ida Villumsen; Henriette Engel Hansen | Denmark | 1:36.675 | SF |
| 6 | Ren Wenjun; Ma Qing; Li Yue; Liu Haiping | China | 1:38.730 | SF |
| 7 | Nikolina Moldovan; Milica Starović; Dalma Ružičić-Benedek; Olivera Moldovan | Serbia | 1:39.316 | SF |

=== Semifinals ===
The top three boats qualified for the final.

==== Semifinal 1 ====
| Rank | Canoer | Country | Time | Notes |
|---|---|---|---|---|
| 1 | Jaimee Lovett; Kayla Imrie; Aimee Fisher; Caitlin Ryan | New Zealand | 1:34.778 | FA |
| 2 | Mariya Povkh; Svitlana Akhadova; Anastasia Todorova; Inna Hryshchun | Ukraine | 1:35.512 | FA |
| 3 | Emma Jørgensen; Amalie Thomsen; Ida Villumsen; Henriette Engel Hansen | Denmark | 1:36.302 | FA |
| 4 | Ren Wenjun; Ma Qing; Li Yue; Liu Haiping | China | 1:37.055 | FB |
| 5 | Inna Klinova; Irina Podoinikova; Natalya Sergeyeva; Zoya Ananchenko | Kazakhstan | 1:37.423 | FB |
| 6 | Magdalena Garro; Brenda Rojas; Sabrina Ameghino; Alexandra Keresztesi | Argentina | 1:38.579 | FB |

==== Semifinal 2 ====
| Rank | Canoer | Country | Time | Notes |
|---|---|---|---|---|
| 1 | Sabrina Hering; Franziska Weber; Steffi Kriegerstein; Tina Dietze | Germany | 1:34.710 | FA |
| 2= | Andréanne Langlois; Émilie Fournel; Genevieve Orton; Kathleen Fraser | Canada | 1:36.254 | FA |
| 2= | Jess Walker; Rachel Cawthorn; Rebii Simon; Louisa Gurski | Great Britain | 1:36.254 | FA |
| 4 | Marta Walczykiewicz; Edyta Dzieniszewska; Karolina Naja; Beata Mikołajczyk | Poland | 1:36.532 | FB |
| 5 | Nikolina Moldovan; Milica Starović; Dalma Ružičić-Benedek; Olivera Moldovan | Serbia | 1:38.398 | FB |
| 6 | Manon Hostens; Amandine Lhote; Léa Jamelot; Sarah Troel | France | 1:39.069 | FB |

=== Finals ===
==== Final B ====
| Rank | Canoer | Country | Time |
|---|---|---|---|
| 9 | Marta Walczykiewicz; Edyta Dzieniszewska; Karolina Naja; Beata Mikołajczyk | Poland | 1:37.658 |
| 10 | Inna Klinova; Irina Podoinikova; Natalya Sergeyeva; Zoya Ananchenko | Kazakhstan | 1:39.419 |
| 11 | Ren Wenjun; Ma Qing; Li Yue; Liu Haiping | China | 1:40.071 |
| 12 | Manon Hostens; Amandine Lhote; Léa Jamelot; Sarah Troel | France | 1:41.069 |
| 13 | Magdalena Garro; Brenda Rojas; Sabrina Ameghino; Alexandra Keresztesi | Argentina | 1:41.394 |
| 14 | Nikolina Moldovan; Milica Starović; Dalma Ružičić-Benedek; Olivera Moldovan | Serbia | 1:42.818 |

==== Final A ====
| Rank | Canoer | Country | Time |
|---|---|---|---|
| 1st place, gold medalist(s) | Gabriella Szabó; Danuta Kozák; Tamara Csipes; Krisztina Fazekas | Hungary | 1:34.482 |
| 2nd place, silver medalist(s) | Sabrina Hering; Franziska Weber; Steffi Kriegerstein; Tina Dietze | Germany | 1:35.383 |
| 3rd place, bronze medalist(s) | Marharyta Makhneva; Nadzeya Liapeshka; Volha Khudzenka; Maryna Litvinchuk | Belarus | 1:36.908 |
| 4 | Mariya Povkh; Svitlana Akhadova; Anastasia Todorova; Inna Hryshchun | Ukraine | 1:37.214 |
| 5 | Jaimee Lovett; Kayla Imrie; Aimee Fisher; Caitlin Ryan | New Zealand | 1:38.198 |
| 6 | Emma Jørgensen; Amalie Thomsen; Ida Villumsen; Henriette Engel Hansen | Denmark | 1:39.057 |
| 7 | Jess Walker; Rachel Cawthorn; Rebii Simon; Louisa Gurski | Great Britain | 1:40.043 |
| 8 | Andréanne Langlois; Émilie Fournel; Genevieve Orton; Kathleen Fraser | Canada | 1:40.733 |
