= Canoeing at the 2016 Summer Olympics =

Canoeing at the Games of the XXXI Olympiad
- Pictograms for the Slalom (left) and Sprint (right)
- Venue: Olympic Whitewater Stadium (slalom); Lagoa Rodrigo de Freitas (sprint)
- Dates: 7–11 August 2016 for Slalom; 15–20 August 2016 for Sprint
- No. of events: 16
- Competitors: 334 from 53 nations

Canoeing at the 2016 Summer Olympics in Rio de Janeiro was contested in two main disciplines: canoe slalom, from 7 to 11 August, and canoe sprint, from 15 to 20 August. The slalom competition was held at the Olympic Whitewater Stadium; whereas the sprint events were staged at Lagoa Rodrigo de Freitas in Copacabana. The location for canoeing events was a source of concern for athletes since the Brazilian federal government's Oswaldo Cruz Foundation lab has found the genes of drug-resistant super bacteria in Rodrigo de Freitas lagoon.

Around 330 athletes participated in 16 events.

== Qualification ==
A new qualification system had been created for both slalom and sprint canoeing at the 2016 Olympic Games. The quotas were set for each event by the International Canoe Federation in August 2014.

== Competition schedule ==
H	Heats	½	Semifinals	F	Final

Slalom
Event↓/Date →	Sun 7	Mon 8	Tue 9		Wed 10		Thu 11	
Men's C-1	H		½	F				
Men's C-2		H					½	F
Men's K-1	H				½	F		
Women's K-1		H					½	F

Sprint
Event↓/Date →	Mon 15		Tue 16	Wed 17		Thu 18	Fri 19		Sat 20
Men's C-1 200 m				H	½	F			
Men's C-1 1000 m	H	½	F						
Men's C-2 1000 m							H	½	F
Men's K-1 200 m							H	½	F
Men's K-1 1000 m	H	½	F						
Men's K-2 200 m				H	½	F			
Men's K-2 1000 m				H	½	F			
Men's K-4 1000 m							H	½	F
Women's K-1 200 m	H	½	F						
Women's K-1 500 m				H	½	F			
Women's K-2 500 m	H	½	F						
Women's K-4 500 m							H	½	F

== Participating ==
=== Participating nations ===
- Argentina (10)
- Australia (18)
- Austria (2)
- Azerbaijan (4)
- Belarus (12)
- Belgium (1)
- Brazil (13)
- Bulgaria (2)
- Canada (9)
- China (10)
- Cook Islands (2)
- Cuba (6)
- Czech Republic (12)
- Denmark (5)
- Ecuador (1)
- Egypt (2)
- France (17)
- Georgia (1)
- Germany (16)
- Great Britain (11)
- Hungary (18)
- Italy (4)
- Japan (5)
- Kazakhstan (13)
- Latvia (2)
- Lebanon (1)
- Lithuania (6)
- Moldova (1)
- Morocco (1)
- Mexico (1)
- Mozambique (2)
- New Zealand (9)
- Nigeria (1)
- Palau (1)
- Poland (15)
- Portugal (7)
- Romania (8)
- Russia (19)
- Samoa (1)
- São Tomé and Príncipe (1)
- Senegal (3)
- Serbia (10)
- Slovakia (12)
- Slovenia (6)
- South Africa (1)
- South Korea (2)
- Spain (11)
- Sweden (5)
- Tunisia (3)
- Turkey (1)
- Ukraine (9)
- United States (5)
- Uzbekistan (4)

== Medal summary ==
=== By event ===
==== Slalom ====
Games	Gold	Silver	Bronze
Men's C-1	Denis Gargaud Chanut; France	Matej Beňuš; Slovakia	Takuya Haneda; Japan
Men's C-2	Ladislav Škantár; Peter Škantár; Slovakia	David Florence; Richard Hounslow; Great Britain	Gauthier Klauss; Matthieu Péché; France
Men's K-1	Joe Clarke; Great Britain	Peter Kauzer; Slovenia	Jiří Prskavec; Czech Republic
Women's K-1	Maialen Chourraut; Spain	Luuka Jones; New Zealand	Jessica Fox; Australia

==== Sprint ====
Men

Games	Gold	Silver	Bronze
C-1 200 metres	Yuriy Cheban; Ukraine	Valentin Demyanenko; Azerbaijan	Isaquias Queiroz; Brazil
C-1 1000 metres^{[a]}	Sebastian Brendel; Germany	Isaquias Queiroz; Brazil	Ilia Shtokalov; Russia
C-2 1000 metres	Sebastian Brendel; Jan Vandrey; Germany	Erlon Silva; Isaquias Queiroz; Brazil	Dmytro Ianchuk; Taras Mishchuk; Ukraine
K-1 200 metres	Liam Heath; Great Britain	Maxime Beaumont; France	Saúl Craviotto; Spain; Ronald Rauhe; Germany
K-1 1000 metres	Marcus Walz; Spain	Josef Dostál; Czech Republic	Roman Anoshkin; Russia
K-2 200 metres	Saúl Craviotto; Cristian Toro; Spain	Liam Heath; Jon Schofield; Great Britain	Aurimas Lankas; Edvinas Ramanauskas; Lithuania
K-2 1000 metres	Max Rendschmidt; Marcus Gross; Germany	Marko Tomićević; Milenko Zorić; Serbia	Ken Wallace; Lachlan Tame; Australia
K-4 1000 metres	Germany; Max Rendschmidt; Tom Liebscher; Max Hoff; Marcus Gross	Slovakia; Denis Myšák; Erik Vlček; Juraj Tarr; Tibor Linka	Czech Republic; Daniel Havel; Lukáš Trefil; Josef Dostál; Jan Štěrba

- ^{Men's C-1 1000 metres} Serghei Tarnovschi of Moldova finished third, but was stripped of his bronze medal due to a failed doping test.

Women

Games	Gold	Silver	Bronze
K-1 200 metres	Lisa Carrington; New Zealand	Marta Walczykiewicz; Poland	Inna Osypenko-Radomska; Azerbaijan
K-1 500 metres	Danuta Kozák; Hungary	Emma Jørgensen; Denmark	Lisa Carrington; New Zealand
K-2 500 metres	Gabriella Szabó; Danuta Kozák; Hungary	Franziska Weber; Tina Dietze; Germany	Beata Mikołajczyk; Karolina Naja; Poland
K-4 500 metres	Hungary; Gabriella Szabó; Danuta Kozák; Tamara Csipes; Krisztina Fazekas	Germany; Sabrina Hering; Franziska Weber; Steffi Kriegerstein; Tina Dietze	Belarus; Marharyta Makhneva; Nadzeya Liapeshka; Volha Khudzenka; Maryna Litvinchuk

=== By nation ===
Key

* Host nation (Brazil)

Rank	Nation	Gold	Silver	Bronze	Total
1	Germany	4	2	1	7
2	Spain	3	0	1	4
3	Hungary	3	0	0	3
4	Great Britain	2	2	0	4
5	Slovakia	1	2	0	3
6	France	1	1	1	3
6	New Zealand	1	1	1	3
8	Ukraine	1	0	1	2
9	Brazil*	0	2	1	3
10	Czech Republic	0	1	2	3
11	Azerbaijan	0	1	1	2
11	Poland	0	1	1	2
13	Denmark	0	1	0	1
13	Serbia	0	1	0	1
13	Slovenia	0	1	0	1
16	Australia	0	0	2	2
16	Russia	0	0	2	2
18	Belarus	0	0	1	1
18	Japan	0	0	1	1
18	Lithuania	0	0	1	1
Totals (20 entries)		16	16	17	49

== See also ==
- Paracanoeing at the 2016 Summer Paralympics
