= Canoe sprint at the 2015 European Games =

- Venue: Kur Sport and Rowing Centre, Mingachevir
- Dates: 14–16 June 2015
- Competitors: 350

Canoeing was contested at the 2015 European Games between 14 and 16 June 2015.

No canoe slalom events were held in Baku. A total of fifteen medal events were held, three for men only in canoe, and 12 events in kayak across both genders, all on flat water.

Despite the sport being described in official literature as canoe sprint, in line with Olympic practice, a canoe marathon, a 5000-metre non-Olympic event, was included for each gender.

== Qualification ==
Each National Olympic Committee (NOC) is restricted to one boat per event, a maximum of fifteen boats, and therefore a maximum of 26 qualified athletes. Azerbaijan, as host, is guaranteed entry of three athletes, in three boats; K1-1000 metres and C1-1000 metres for men, and the K1-500 metres for women.

The bulk of qualification (all places other than host and 'universality' places) will be awarded by virtue of performance in the 2014 European Canoe Sprint Championships. Places will be awarded to NOCs rather than individual athletes. Each event has a quota of places available as set out below:

| Event | Quota (boats/athletes) | Event | Quota (boats/athletes) |
|---|---|---|---|
| Men | | Women | |
| K1-200m | 23(23) | K1-200m | 18(18) |
| K1-1000m | 23(23) | K1-500m | 18(18) |
| K1-5000m | 13(13) | K1-5000m | 13(13) |
| K2-200m | 14(28) | K2-200m | 14(28) |
| K2-1000m | 14(28) | K2-500m | 14(28) |
| K4-1000m | 10(40) | K4-1000m | 10(40) |
| C1-200m | 15(15) | | |
| C1-1000m | 15(15) | | |
| C2-1000m | 10(20) | | |

In the event an athlete qualifies in two boats (e.g. K1-1000m and K2-1000m), he or she will be allowed to compete in both events, but will only take up the quota place in the larger boat; the unused quota place in the smaller boat will then be redistributed. Where a boat qualifies in two events of the same boat size but over two distances (e.g. 200m and 1000m in K2), that boat will be allowed to compete in both events, but will only take up the quota place in the longer event; the unused quota place in the shorter event will then be redistributed. In both cases this will allow for more boats to compete in a particular event than there are quota places.

== Timetable ==
| OC | Opening ceremony | T | Training day | ● | Event competitions | 1 | Event finals | CC | Closing ceremony |

| June | 12th Fri | 13th Sat | 14th Sun | 15th Mon | 16th Tue | 17th Wed | 18th Thu | 19th Fri | 20th Sat | 21st Sun | 22nd Mon | 23rd Tue | 24th Wed | 25th Thu | 26th Fri | 27th Sat | 28th Sun | Events |
|---|---|---|---|---|---|---|---|---|---|---|---|---|---|---|---|---|---|---|
| Canoe sprint | OC | | ● | 5 | 10 | | | | | | | | | | | | CC | 15 |

== Medalists ==
=== Men ===
| Event | Gold | Silver | Bronze |
|---|---|---|---|
| C-1 200m | Henrikas Žustautas; Lithuania | Valentin Demyanenko; Azerbaijan | Martin Fuksa; Czech Republic |
| C-1 1000m | Sebastian Brendel; Germany | Martin Fuksa; Czech Republic | Attila Vajda; Hungary |
| C-2 1000m | Belarus; Andrei Bahdanovich; Aliaksandr Bahdanovich | Russia; Alexey Korovashkov; Ilya Pervukhin | Germany; Peter Kretschmer; Michael Mueller |
| K-1 200m^{1} | Petter Menning; Sweden | Ed McKeever; Great Britain | Aleksejs Rumjancevs; Latvia Marko Dragosavljević; Serbia |
| K-1 1000m | Max Hoff; Germany | Fernando Pimenta; Portugal | Rene Holten Poulsen; Denmark |
| K-1 5000m | Max Hoff; Germany | Fernando Pimenta; Portugal | Cyrille Carré; France |
| K-2 200m | Serbia; Nebojša Grujić; Marko Novaković | Germany; Ronald Rauhe; Tom Liebscher | Hungary; Sándor Tótka; Péter Molnár |
| K-2 1000m | Hungary; Zoltán Kammerer; Tamás Szalai | Germany; Max Rendschmidt; Marcus Gross | Belarus; Vitaliy Bialko; Raman Piatrushenka |
| K-4 1000m | Hungary; Zoltán Kammerer; Dávid Tóth; Tamás Kulifai; Dániel Pauman | Russia; Alexandr Sergeev; Vasily Pogreban; Anton Ryakhov; Vladislav Blintcov | Belarus; Pavel Miadzvedzeu; Aleh Yurenia; Vitaliy Bialko; Raman Piatrushenka |

Notes

1. Miklós Dudás of Hungary originally won the gold medal, but were later disqualified due to doping violations.

=== Women ===
| Event | Gold | Silver | Bronze |
|---|---|---|---|
| K-1 200m | Marta Walczykiewicz; Poland | Natalia Podolskaya; Russia | Danuta Kozák; Hungary |
| K-1 500m | Danuta Kozák; Hungary | Yvonne Schuring; Austria | Ewelina Wojnarowska; Poland |
| K-1 5000m | Maryna Litvinchuk; Belarus | Lani Belcher; Great Britain | Renáta Csay; Hungary |
| K-2 200m | Belarus; Marharyta Makhneva; Maryna Litvinchuk | Serbia; Nikolina Moldovan; Olivera Moldovan | Ukraine; Mariya Povkh; Anastasiia Todorova |
| K-2 500m | Serbia; Milica Starović; Dalma Ružičić-Benedek | Romania; Roxana Borha; Elena Meroniac | Hungary; Anna Kárász; Ninetta Vad |
| K-4 500m | Hungary; Gabriella Szabó; Anna Kárász; Danuta Kozák; Ninetta Vad | Germany; Franziska Weber; Verena Hantl; Conny Wassmuth; Tina Dietze | Poland; Karolina Naja; Ewelina Wojnarowska; Edyta Dzieniszewska-Kierkla; Beata Mikołajczyk |

== Medal table ==
* Host nation (Azerbaijan)

| Rank | Nation | Gold | Silver | Bronze | Total |
|---|---|---|---|---|---|
| 1 | Hungary | 4 | 0 | 5 | 9 |
| 2 | Germany | 3 | 3 | 1 | 7 |
| 3 | Belarus | 3 | 0 | 2 | 5 |
| 4 | Serbia | 2 | 1 | 1 | 4 |
| 5 | Poland | 1 | 0 | 2 | 3 |
| 6 | Lithuania | 1 | 0 | 0 | 1 |
| 6 | Sweden | 1 | 0 | 0 | 1 |
| 8 | Russia | 0 | 3 | 0 | 3 |
| 9 | Great Britain | 0 | 2 | 0 | 2 |
| 9 | Portugal | 0 | 2 | 0 | 2 |
| 11 | Czech Republic | 0 | 1 | 1 | 2 |
| 12 | Austria | 0 | 1 | 0 | 1 |
| 12 | Azerbaijan* | 0 | 1 | 0 | 1 |
| 12 | Romania | 0 | 1 | 0 | 1 |
| 15 | Denmark | 0 | 0 | 1 | 1 |
| 15 | France | 0 | 0 | 1 | 1 |
| 15 | Latvia | 0 | 0 | 1 | 1 |
| 15 | Ukraine | 0 | 0 | 1 | 1 |
| Totals (18 entries) | | 15 | 15 | 16 | 46 |
