= 2013 Canoe Sprint European Championships =

International canoeing and kayaking event

The 2013 Canoe Sprint European Championships were the 25th edition of the Canoe Sprint European Championships, an international canoe and kayak sprint event organised by the European Canoe Association, and the 15th edition since its revival in 1997. They were held for the first time in Portugal, at the Center for High Performance in Montemor-o-Velho, between 14 and 16 June 2013. As in the previous edition, the competition comprised 26 events, of which 16 were for men and 10 for women.

== Medal overview ==
=== Men ===
Event	Gold	Time	Silver	Time	Bronze	Time
C-1 200 m	Jevgenij Shuklin (LTU)	41.676	Valentin Demyanenko (AZE)	41.726	Andrii Kraitor (RUS)	42.136
C-1 500 m	Martin Fuksa (CZE)	1:51.693	Dzianis Harazha (BLR)	1:51.763	Marcin Grzybowski (POL)	1:52.693
C-1 1000 m	Martin Fuksa (CZE)	3:52.046	Mathieu Goubel (FRA)	3:53.741	Marcin Grzybowski (POL)	3:54.421
C-1 5000 m	Sebastian Brendel (GER)	22:57.583	Marcin Grzybowski (POL)	23:07.102	Florin Comănici (ROU)	23:16.729
C-2 200 m	Russia; Aleksandr Kovalenko; Nikolay Lipkin	37.364	Belarus; Dzmitry Rabchanka; Aleksandr Vauchetskiy	37.784	Germany; Robert Nuck; Stefan Holtz	38.219
C-2 500 m	Russia; Alexey Korovashkov; Ivan Shtyl	1:42.206	Romania; Alexandru Dumitrescu; Victor Mihalachi	1:44.771	Poland; Tomasz Kaczor; Vincent Słomiński	1:45.426
C-2 1000 m	Russia; Alexey Korovashkov; Ilya Pervukhin	3:33.548	Hungary; Henrik Vasbányai; Róbert Mike	3:33.898	Romania; Alexandru Dumitrescu; Victor Mihalachi	3:36.453
C-4 1000 m	Belarus; Dzmitry Rabchanka; Dzianis Harazha; Dzmitry Vaitsishkin; Aleksandr Vauchetskiy	3:23.773	Romania; Florin Comănici; Gabriel Gheoca; Cătălin Costache; Josif Chirilă	3:24.498	Ukraine; Vitaliy Vergeles; Denys Kovalenko; Denys Kamerylov; Eduard Shemetylo	3:24.628
K-1 200 m	Petter Öström (SWE)	35.217	Marko Dragosavljević (SRB)	35.537	Tom Liebscher (GER)	35.742
K-1 500 m	René Holten Poulsen (DEN)	1:41.506	Miklós Dudás (HUN)	1:42.496	Max Hoff (GER)	1:42.696
K-1 1000 m	René Holten Poulsen (DEN)	3:27.225	Max Hoff (GER)	3:28.435	Josef Dostál (CZE)	3:28.910
K-1 5000 m	Max Hoff (GER)	19:52.304	Fernando Pimenta (POR)	19:57.982	René Holten Poulsen (DEN)	20:05.102
K-2 200 m	Russia; Yury Postrigay; Alexander Dyachenko	31.994	Germany; Ronald Rauhe; Jonas Ems	32.564	France; Sébastien Jouve; Maxime Beaumont	32.654
K-2 500 m	Germany; Max Rendschmidt; Marcus Gross	1:32.389	Serbia; Simo Boltić; Marko Dragosavljević	1:33.089	Poland; Paweł Szandrach; Mariusz Kujawski	1:33.144
K-2 1000 m	Germany; Max Rendschmidt; Marcus Gross	3:10.337	Russia; Ilya Medvedev; Anton Ryakhov	3:10.512	Czech Republic; Daniel Havel; Jan Štěrba	3:11.687
K-4 1000 m	Czech Republic; Daniel Havel; Josef Dostál; Lukáš Trefil; Jan Štěrba	2:55.806	Portugal; Fernando Pimenta; Emanuel Silva; João Ribeiro; David Fernandes	2:56.856	Hungary; Zoltán Kammerer; Tamás Kulifai; Dávid Tóth; Dániel Pauman	2:57.711

=== Women ===
Event	Gold	Time	Silver	Time	Bronze	Time
C-1 200 m	Maria Kazakova (RUS)	51.709	Staniliya Stamenova (BUL)	51.814	Kincső Takács (HUN)	52.469
C-2 500 m	Hungary; Zsanett Lakatos; Kincső Takács	2:09.316	Russia; Natalia Marasanova; Anastasia Ganina	2:10.581	Ukraine; Nataliya Zhiliuk; Dariya Motova	2:23.281
K-1 200 m	Marta Walczykiewicz (POL)	42.549	María Teresa Portela (ESP)	42.594	Natasa Dusev-Janics (HUN)	42.809
K-1 500 m	Dalma Ružičić-Benedek (SRB)	1:52.758	Danuta Kozák (HUN)	1:53.133	Katrin Wagner-Augustin (GER)	1:53.698
K-1 1000 m	Dalma Ružičić-Benedek (SRB)	3:54.225	Henriette Hansen (DEN)	3:57.680	Erika Medveczky (HUN)	3:58.305
K-1 5000 m	Renáta Csay (HUN)	22:49.691	Louisa Sawers (GBR)	22:53:360	Eva Barrios (ESP)	23:07.192
K-2 200 m	Hungary; Katalin Kovács; Natasa Dusev-Janics	39.363	Poland; Karolina Naja; Magdalena Krukowska	39.418	Romania; Roxana Borha; Iuliana Taran	39.543
K-2 500 m	Poland; Karolina Naja; Beata Mikołajczyk	1:44.674	Germany; Franziska Weber; Tina Dietze	1:45.484	Hungary; Katalin Kovács; Natasa Dusev-Janics	1:45.849
K-2 1000 m	Poland; Karolina Naja; Beata Mikołajczyk	3:36.410	Germany; Carolin Leonhardt; Conny Waßmuth	3:37.245	Romania; Irina Lauric; Bianca Plesca	3:38.835
K-4 500 m	Hungary; Anna Kárász; Katalin Kovács; Danuta Kozák; Natasa Dusev-Janics	1:31.114	Germany; Franziska Weber; Katrin Wagner-Augustin; Verena Hantl; Tina Dietze	1:32.509	Belarus; Aleksandra Grishina; Volha Khudzenka; Nadzeya Papok; Marharyta Tsishkevich	1:32.524

== Paracanoe ==
=== Medal events ===
Non-Paralympic classes

Event	Gold		Silver		Bronze	
Men's K–1 A	Jakub Tokarz (POL)	54.625	Ian Marsden (GBR)	57.350	Adrián Castaño (ESP)	58.385
Men's K–1 TA	Markus Swoboda (AUT)	43.456	Tomasz Mozdzierski (POL)	48.176	János Bencze (HUN)	48.721
Men's K–1 LTA	Iulian Șerban (ROU)	42.071	Tom Kierey (GER)	43.221	Robert Oliver (GBR)	44.391
Men's V–1 A	Jakub Tokarz (POL)	1:07.277	Daniel Hopwood (GBR)	1:09.157	Stefano Chiozzotto (ITA)	1:22.307
Men's V–1 TA	Nicholas Heald (GBR)	54.141	Javier Reja Muñoz (ESP)	54.981	Ronan Bernard (FRA)	55.276
Men's V–1 LTA	Martin Tweedy (GBR)	56.010	Konstantin Borkut (RUS)	57.150	Mirosław Rosiński (POL)	57.590
Women's K–1 TA	Emma Wiggs (GBR)	57.783	Nataliia Lagutenko (UKR)	1:10.708	Katalin Kajdi (HUN)	1:21.553
Women's K–1 LTA	Anne Dickins (GBR)	56.645	Mihaela Lulea (ROU)	58.590	Cindy Moreau (FRA)	59.410
Women's V–1 LTA	Jeanette Chippington (GBR)	1:01.892	Brit Gottschalk (GER)	1:09.282	Paulina Rutkowska (POL)	1:22.452

== Medal table ==
Medals:

=== Canoe ===
Rank	Nation	Gold	Silver	Bronze	Total
1	Russia	5	2	1	8
2	Germany	4	5	4	13
3	Hungary	4	3	5	12
4	Poland	3	2	4	9
5	Czech Republic	3	0	2	5
6	Serbia	2	2	0	4
7	Denmark	2	1	1	4
8	Belarus	1	2	1	4
9	Lithuania	1	0	0	1
9	Sweden	1	0	0	1
11	Romania	0	2	4	6
12	Portugal	0	2	0	2
13	France	0	1	1	2
13	Spain	0	1	1	2
15	Azerbaijan	0	1	0	1
15	Bulgaria	0	1	0	1
15	Great Britain	0	1	0	1
18	Ukraine	0	0	2	2
Totals (18 entries)		26	26	26	78

=== Para Canoe ===
Results:

Rank	Nation	Gold	Silver	Bronze	Total
1	Great Britain	5	2	1	8
2	Poland	2	1	2	5
3	Romania	1	1	0	2
4	Austria	1	0	0	1
5	Germany	0	2	0	2
6	Spain	0	1	1	2
7	Russia	0	1	0	1
7	Ukraine	0	1	0	1
9	France	0	0	2	2
9	Hungary	0	0	2	2
11	Italy	0	0	1	1
Totals (11 entries)		9	9	9	27
