= Henriette Engel Hansen =

Danish canoeist

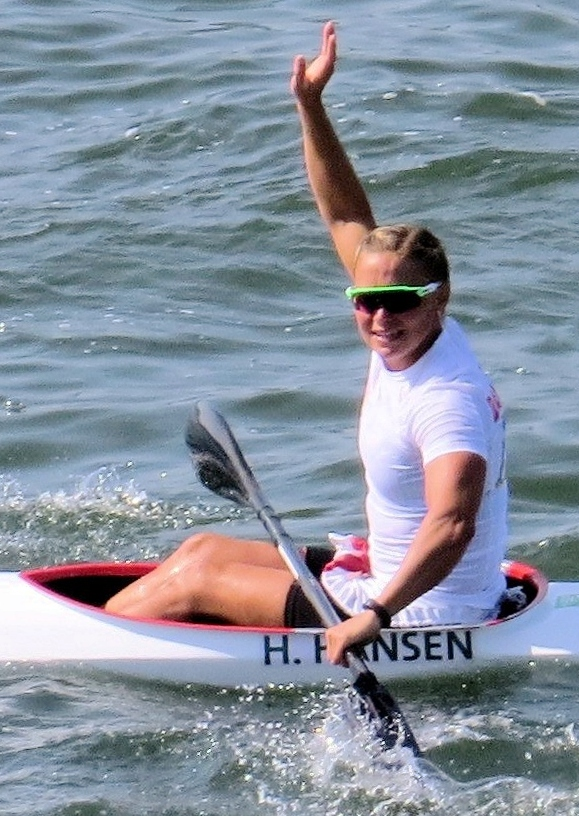
- Hansen at the 2016 Olympics

Personal information
- Born: 15 April 1982 (age 44) Hillerød, Denmark
- Height: 176 cm (5 ft 9 in)
- Weight: 80 kg (176 lb)

Sport
- Sport: Canoe sprint
- Club: 361 Kano- og Kajakklub
- Coached by: Zoltán Bakó (national)
Medal record
Women's canoe sprint
Representing Denmark
World Championships
Gold medal – first place	2014 Moscow	K-2 1000 m
European Championships
Silver medal – second place	2013 Montemor-o-Velho	K-1 1000 m
Bronze medal – third place	2009 Brandenburg	K-1 1000 m
Women's canoe marathon
World Championships
Gold medal – first place	2007 Győr	K-2
Gold medal – first place	2008 Týn nad Vltavou	K-2
Gold medal – first place	2009 Gala	K-2
Gold medal – first place	2013 Copenhagen	K-2

Henriette Engel Hansen (born 15 April 1982) is a world champion Danish canoe sprinter and marathon canoeist. She and team-mate Emma Aastrand Jørgensen won the K-2 1000 m title at the 2014 World Championships.

== Career ==
At the 2008 Summer Olympics, she was eliminated in the K-1 500 m semifinals. At the 2012 Summer Olympics, she was eliminated in the K-1 200 m semifinals and placed seventh in the K-1 500 m event. At the 2016 Olympics she competed in the K-1 200 m and K-4 500 m and placed sixth in the latter event.
