= Florin Comănici =

Romanian sprint canoer

Medal record

Men's sprint canoeing

Representing Romania

World Championships
Silver medal – second place	2010 Poznań	C-4 1000 m
Silver medal – second place	2011 Szeged	C-4 1000 m

European Championships
Gold medal – first place	2012 Zagreb	C-1 5000 m
Silver medal – second place	2012 Zagreb	C-4 1000 m
Silver medal – second place	2013 Montemor-o-Velho	C-4 1000 m
Bronze medal – third place	2013 Montemor-o-Velho	C-1 5000 m

Florin Comănici is a Romanian sprint canoer who has been competing since the late 2000s. He won a silver medal in the C-4 1000 m event at the 2010 ICF Canoe Sprint World Championships in Poznań.
