= Jaimee Lovett =

New Zealand canoeist

Jaimee Lovett (born 5 May 1988, in Whakatāne) is a New Zealand canoeist.

== Career ==
She represented New Zealand at the 2016 Summer Olympics. She competed alongside Caitlin Ryan, Kayla Imrie and Aimee Fisher in the Women's K-4 500 metres event. After having trained together for just 18 months, the young crew achieved a fifth place in the medal race.

== Personal life ==
Of Māori descent, Lovett affiliates to Waikato Tainui and Ngāti Raukawa.
