= Caitlin Regal =

New Zealand canoeist

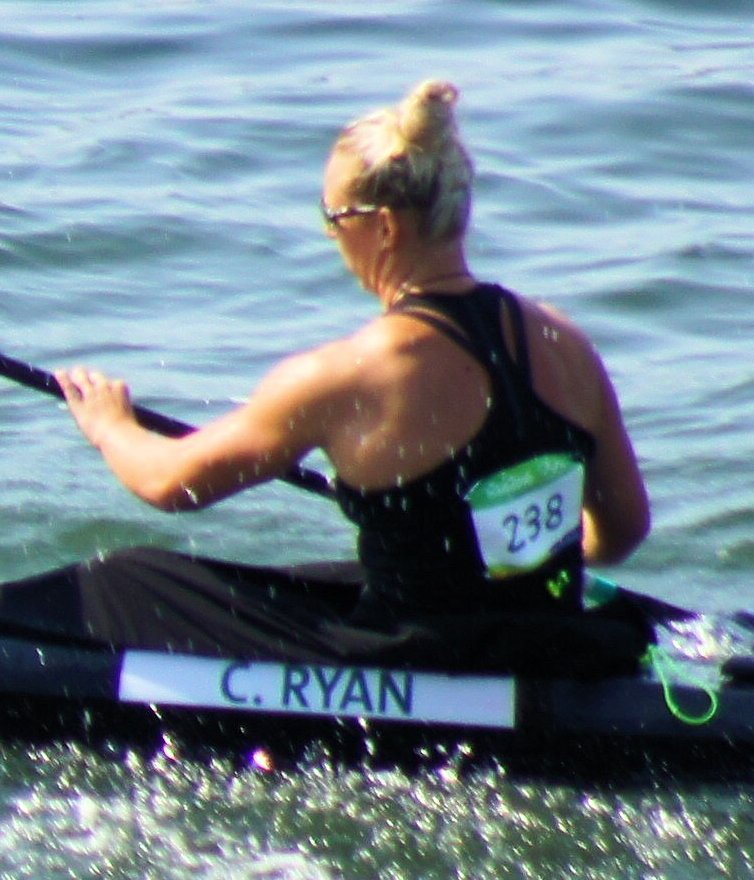
- Regal at the 2016 Summer Olympics

Personal information
- Nationality: New Zealand
- Born: Caitlin Ryan; 9 February 1992 (age 34) Takapuna, New Zealand
- Height: 1.78 m (5 ft 10 in)
- Weight: 95 kg (209 lb)

Sport
- Country: New Zealand
- Sport: Canoe sprint
Medal record
Women's canoe sprint
Representing New Zealand
Olympic Games
Gold medal – first place	2020 Tokyo	K-2 500 m
World Championships
Gold medal – first place	2017 Račice	K-2 500 m
Silver medal – second place	2018 Montemor-o-Velho	K-2 500 m
Silver medal – second place	2018 Montemor-o-Velho	K-4 500 m
Bronze medal – third place	2017 Račice	K-4 500 m

Caitlin Regal (née Ryan; born 9 February 1992) is a New Zealand canoeist. On 3 August 2021 she won a gold medal alongside Lisa Carrington in the K-2 500 metres event.

== Early life ==
Regal was born on 9 February 1992 in Takapuna, a suburb of North Shore. Aged 5, she joined the Red Beach Surf Life Saving & Squash Club on the Hibiscus Coast north of Auckland, where she later competed in surf competition. By age 14, she had qualified as a life guard. She has won numerous titles at the New Zealand Surf Life Saving Championships.

== Canoeing ==
At the 2015 Canoe World Cup in Portugal, she won gold in the Women's K-4 500 metres event, and silver in the Women's K-2 500 metres event. She represented New Zealand at the 2016 Summer Olympics finishing fifth in the Women's K-4 500 metres alongside Jaimee Lovett, Kayla Imrie and Aimee Fisher.

At the 2020 Summer Olympics in Tokyo, she once again represented New Zealand. She competed in the Women's K-1 500 metres, Women's K-2 500 metres, and Women's K-4 500 metres.

== Personal life ==
Regal married her partner, Nick Regal, in early 2021.
