= Amandine Lhote =

French canoeist

Personal information
- Born: 22 December 1986 (age 39) Cambrai, France

Sport
- Sport: Canoe sprint

Amandine Lhote (born 22 December 1986) is a French canoeist. She competed in the women's K-4 500 metres event at the 2016 Summer Olympics.
