= Iuliana Țăran =

Romanian sprint canoeist (born 1995)

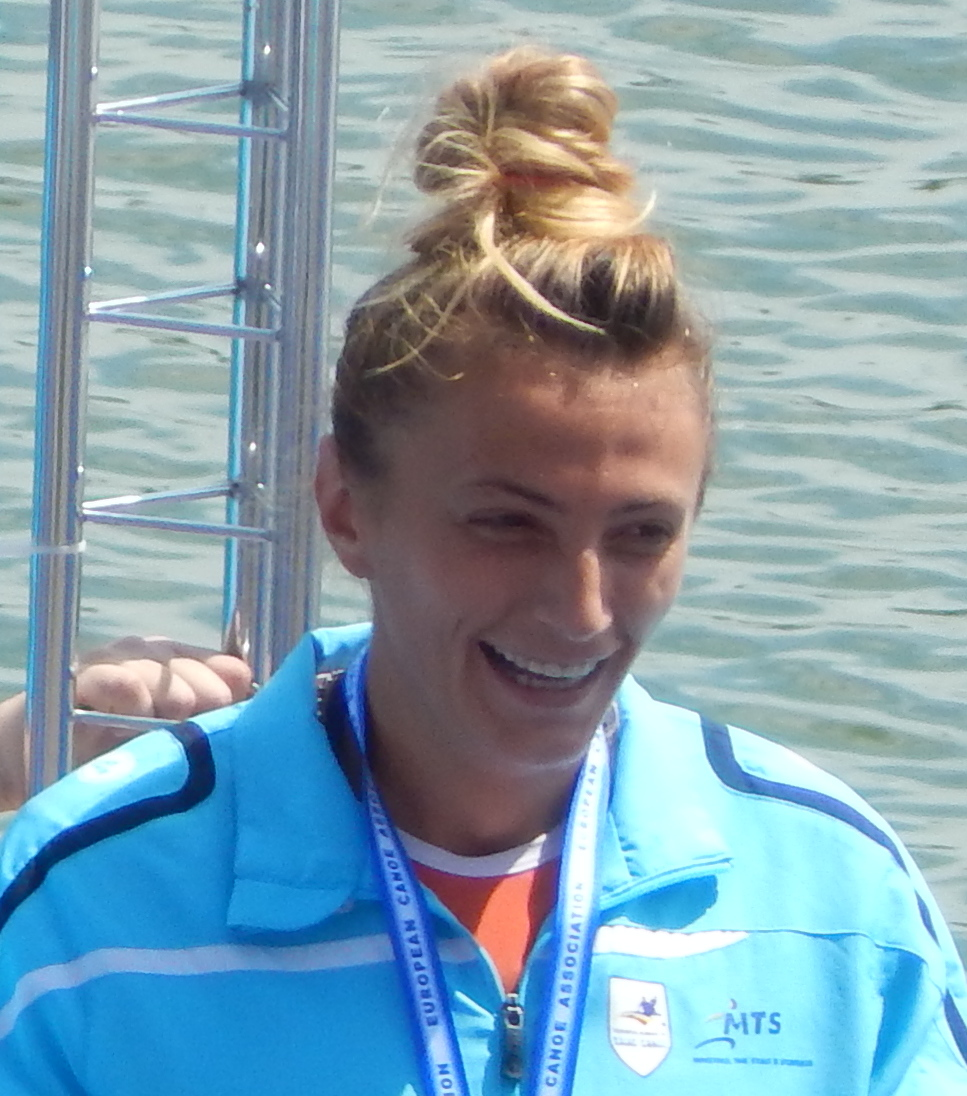
- Țăran in 2016

Personal information
- National team: Romania
- Born: 14 May 1995 (age 30)

Sport
- Sport: Canoe sprint

Iuliana Țăran (born 14 May 1995) is a Romanian sprint canoeist. She won a bronze medal at the 2013 Canoe Sprint European Championships and has competed at the European Games and Summer Olympics.

== Career ==
At the 2011 Junior World Championships in Brandenburg, Germany, Țăran won gold in the single kayak 200m event.

At the 2013 Canoe Sprint European Championships in Montemor-o-Velho, Portugal, Țăran won a bronze medal in the 200m double kayak event with Roxana Borha with a time of 39.54 seconds. The duo had come sixth in the event the previous year.

At the 2015 European Games in Baku, Azerbaijan, Țăran competed in the 500m kayak event with Borha, Irina Lauric and Elena Meroniac, placing fourth with a time of 1 minute 34 seconds. They came first in their heat stage ahead of the French and Russian teams.

Țăran competed as part of the Romanian Olympic team at the 2016 Summer Olympics in Rio de Janeiro, Brazil.
