= Anastasiia Dolgova =

Russian canoeist

Personal information
- Full name: Anastasiia Sergeyevna Dolgova
- Nationality: Russian
- Born: 14 February 2000 (age 26) Sevastopol, Ukraine

Sport
- Country: Russia
- Sport: Sprint kayak
Medal record
Women's sprint kayak
Representing Russia
World Championships
Gold medal – first place	2021 Copenhagen	K-2 200 m
Representing ANA
World Championships
Gold medal – first place	2024 Samarkand	K-2 200 m
Silver medal – second place	2024 Samarkand	K-1 200 m

Anastasiia Sergeyevna Dolgova (Russian: Анастасия Сергеевна Долгова; born 14 February 2000) is a Russian sprint canoeist. She competed in the women's K-4 500 metres event at the 2020 Summer Olympics.

== Major results ==
=== Olympic Games ===
Year	K-4 500
2020	4 FB

=== World championships ===
Year	K-1 200	K-2 200	K-2 500	K-4 500
2019		4		9
2021		1st place, gold medalist(s)	6	
2024	2nd place, silver medalist(s)	1st place, gold medalist(s)	—N/a	—N/a
