= Svitlana Akhadova =

Ukrainian canoeist (born 1993)

Personal information
- Nationality: Ukrainian
- Born: 10 May 1993 (age 31)
- Height: 1.70 m (5 ft 7 in)
- Weight: 69 kg (152 lb)

Sport
- Country: Ukraine
- Sport: Canoe

Svitlana Viktorivna Akhadova (Світлана Вікторівна Ахадова; born 10 May 1993) is a Ukrainian canoeist. She represented her country at the 2016 Summer Olympics.
