= Tamara Takács =

Hungarian-Turkish canoeist (born 1996)

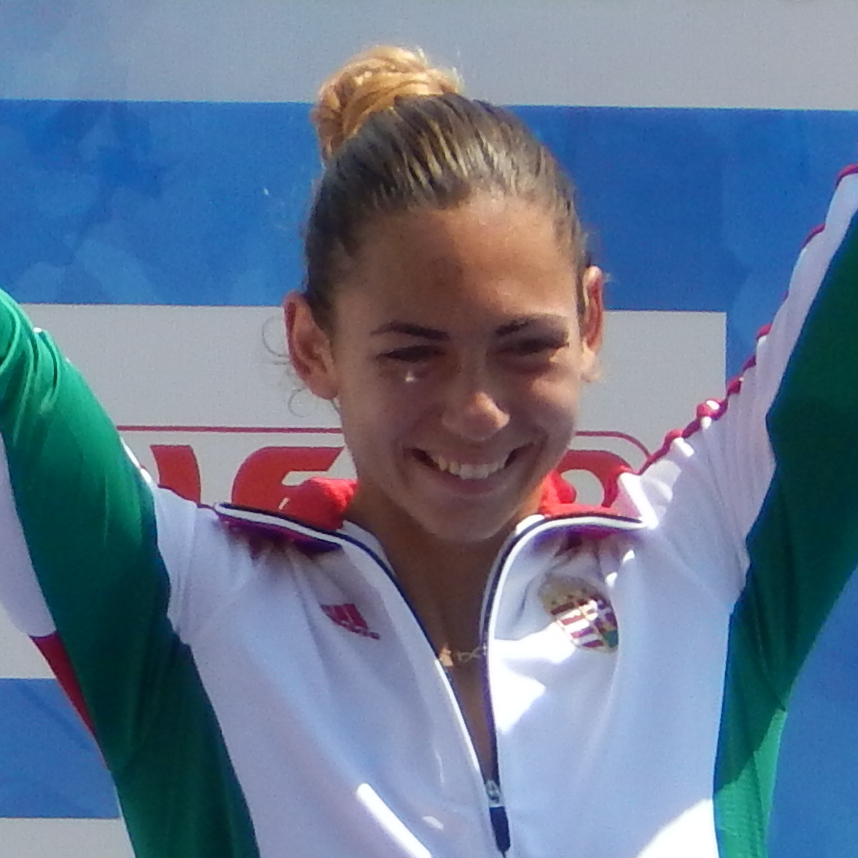
- Takács in 2016

Personal information
- Nationality: Turkish
- Born: 29 July 1996 (age 30) Győr, Hungary

Sport
- Sport: Sprint kayak
- Events: K-4 500 m, K-1 1000, K-2 1000
Medal record
Women's sprint kayak
Representing Hungary
World Championships
| Gold medal – first place | 2017 Račice | K-4 500 m |
European Championships
| Gold medal – first place | 2017 Plovdiv | K-1 500 m |
| Gold medal – first place | 2017 Plovdiv | K-4 500 m |
| Gold medal – first place | 2018 Belgrade | K-1 5000 m |
| Silver medal – second place | 2016 Moscow | K-2 1000 m |
| Silver medal – second place | 2016 Moscow | K-1 1000 m |
| Silver medal – second place | 2018 Belgrade | K-1 1000 m |

Tamara Takács (born 29 July 1996) is a Hungarian-born Turkish sprint canoeist.

== Career ==
In July 2017, Takács competed at the 2017 Canoe Sprint European Championships and won gold medals in the K-1 500 metres and K-4 500 metres. In August 2017, she represented Hungary at the 2017 ICF Canoe Sprint World Championships and won a gold medal in the K-4 500 metres.

In June 2018, she competed at the 2018 Canoe Sprint European Championships and won a gold medal in the K-1 5000 metres and a silver medal in the K-1 1000 metres. In February 2019, she recorded an anti-doping rule violation, when Stanozolol was found in her sample. She pleaded not guilty and received a four-year competition ban. After her ban, she was no longer able to compete for the Hungarian national team, and became a naturalized citizen of Turkey.
