= Rebeka Simon =

British sprint canoer (born 1996)

Personal information
- Born: 6 July 1996 (age 29) Budapest, Hungary
- Height: 173 cm (5 ft 8 in)
- Weight: 70 kg (154 lb)

Rebeka "Rebii" Simon (born 6 July 1996) is a British-Hungarian canoe sprinter who competed in the 2016 Summer Olympics.

== Early life ==
Simon was born in Budapest, Hungary and moved to Walton-on-Thames, England at an early age. Discovering kayaking at the age of six, Simon was training six days a week by the age of 10. She won her first national championship later that year, and by 13 was often training twice a day. She attended Rydens Enterprise School.

== Career ==
In 2009, Simon represented Team GB for the first time at an international competition aged 13. Competing in France and Germany, she went on to make the finals and won medals in the Under-18 events. She claimed silver in the K-2 1,000 m at the Junior World Championships in 2011.

Simon competed in the Junior European Championships in both 2012 and 2013, becoming the European Champion in the 1,000 m sprint in the latter year. She also recorded a personal best in the 500 m sprint that year while placing fifth.

In 2014, Simon won silver in the K-1 500 m sprint at the Junior World Championships in Szeged, Hungary. Shortly after, she was selected to represent Team GB at the Senior World Championships in Moscow, Russia in the K-1 1000 m sprint. She finished in fifth, just four seconds behind winner Teneale Hatton.

In September 2014, Simon was named on the shortlist for the BBC Young Sports Personality of the Year. The award was won by artistic gymnast Claudia Fragapane.

Simon competed in the 2016 Summer Olympics in Brazil.
