= Karolina Naja =

Polish canoeist (born 1990)

Personal information
- Full name: Karolina Elżbieta Naja
- Nationality: Polish
- Born: 5 February 1990 (age 36) Tychy, Poland
- Height: 1.65 m (5 ft 5 in)
- Weight: 62 kg (137 lb)

Sport
- Country: Poland
- Sport: Sprint kayak
- Event(s): K-2 200 m, K-2 500 m, K-2 1000 m, K-4 500 m
- Club: AZS-AWF
Medal record
Women's canoe sprint
Representing Poland
| Event | 1st | 2nd | 3rd |
|---|---|---|---|
| Olympic Games | 0 | 1 | 3 |
| World Championships | 3 | 6 | 6 |
| European Championships | 6 | 6 | 1 |
| European Games | 1 | 0 | 2 |
| Total | 10 | 13 | 12 |
Olympic Games
| Silver medal – second place | 2020 Tokyo | K-2 500 m |
| Bronze medal – third place | 2012 London | K-2 500 m |
| Bronze medal – third place | 2016 Rio de Janeiro | K-2 500 m |
| Bronze medal – third place | 2020 Tokyo | K-4 500 m |
World Championships
| Gold medal – first place | 2014 Moscow | K-1 4×200 m |
| Gold medal – first place | 2022 Dartmouth | K-2 500 m |
| Gold medal – first place | 2022 Dartmouth | K-4 500 m |
| Silver medal – second place | 2011 Szeged | K-2 200 m |
| Silver medal – second place | 2013 Duisburg | K-2 200 m |
| Silver medal – second place | 2013 Duisburg | K-1 4×200 m |
| Silver medal – second place | 2014 Moscow | K-4 500 m |
| Silver medal – second place | 2019 Szeged | K-2 500 m |
| Silver medal – second place | 2023 Duisburg | K-4 500 m |
| Bronze medal – third place | 2010 Poznań | K-4 500 m |
| Bronze medal – third place | 2011 Szeged | K-1 4×200 m |
| Bronze medal – third place | 2013 Duisburg | K-2 500 m |
| Bronze medal – third place | 2014 Moscow | K-2 500 m |
| Bronze medal – third place | 2018 Montemor-o-Velho | K-4 500 m |
| Bronze medal – third place | 2019 Szeged | K-4 500 m |
European Games
| Gold medal – first place | 2023 Kraków–Małopolska | K-2 500 m |
| Gold medal – first place | 2023 Kraków–Małopolska | K-4 500 m |
| Bronze medal – third place | 2015 Baku | K-4 500 m |
| Bronze medal – third place | 2019 Minsk | K-4 500 m |
European Championships
| Gold medal – first place | 2012 Zagreb | K-2 1000 m |
| Gold medal – first place | 2013 Montemor-o-Velho | K-2 500 m |
| Gold medal – first place | 2013 Montemor-o-Velho | K-2 1000 m |
| Gold medal – first place | 2015 Račice | K-2 500 m |
| Gold medal – first place | 2022 Munich | K-2 500 m |
| Gold medal – first place | 2022 Munich | K-4 500 m |
| Silver medal – second place | 2013 Montemor-o-Velho | K-2 200 m |
| Silver medal – second place | 2014 Brandenburg | K-2 500 m |
| Silver medal – second place | 2014 Brandenburg | K-4 500 m |
| Silver medal – second place | 2015 Račice | K-2 200 m |
| Silver medal – second place | 2015 Račice | K-2 1000 m |
| Silver medal – second place | 2021 Poznań | K-2 500 m |
| Bronze medal – third place | 2012 Zagreb | K-2 500 m |

Karolina Elżbieta Naja (Polish pronunciation: [karɔˈlina ˈnaja]; born 5 February 1990) is a Polish sprint canoeist who has competed since the late 2000s. At the 2020 Summer Olympics, she won a bronze medal in Women's K-4 500 metres, and silver medal in Women's K-2 500 metres.

== Career ==
She took up canoeing in her home town of Tychy in 2001.

Naja and the Polish K-4 500 m team won the bronze medal at the 2010 ICF Canoe Sprint World Championships.

At the 2011 ICF Canoe Sprint World Championships Naja and Magdalena Krukowska won the silver medal in the K-2 200 m. The Polish team Naja was a member of also won bronze in the K1 4 × 200m relay.

She won the bronze medal in K-2 500 m event at the 2012 Summer Olympics in London with Beata Mikołajczyk. The women's K-4 500 m team Naja was part of finished in 4th place in London. At that year's European Championships Naja and Mikołajczyk won gold in the K-2 1000 m and bronze in the K-2 500 m.

Naja and Mikołajczyk won a silver medal in the K-2 200 m event at the 2013 ICF Canoe Sprint World Championships in Duisburg, along with a bronze in the K-2 500 m. The Polish team Naja was a member of also won silver in the K1 4 × 200m relay. At the European Championships that year, Naja and Mikołajczyk won the K-2 500 m and K-2 1000 m. Naja won the silver medal in the K-2 200 m with Magdalena Krukowska.

At the 2014 ICF Canoe Sprint World Championships, she won a silver medal in the women's K-4 500 m team, with Mikołajczyk, Marta Walczykiewicz and Edyta Dzieniszewska, and a bronze with Mikołajczyk in the K-2 500 m. The Polish team Naja was a member of also won the K1 4 × 200m relay. Naja and Mikołajczyk won silver in the K-2 500 m and were part of the Polish K-4 500 m team that won the silver medal at the 2014 European Championships.

In June 2015, she competed in the inaugural European Games, for Poland in canoe sprint, more specifically, the women's K-4 500m with Ewelina Wojnarowska, Edyta Dzieniszewska, and Beata Mikołajczyk. She earned a bronze medal. That year Naja and Mikołajczyk won the gold medal in the K-2 500 m and silver medals in the K-2 200 m in the K-2 1000 m at the European Championships.

At the 2016 Olympic Games, Naja again won bronze with Mikołajczyk in the K-2 500 m event. This time, the K-4 500 m team Naja was part of finished in 9th.
