= Kayla Imrie =

New Zealand canoeist (born 1992)

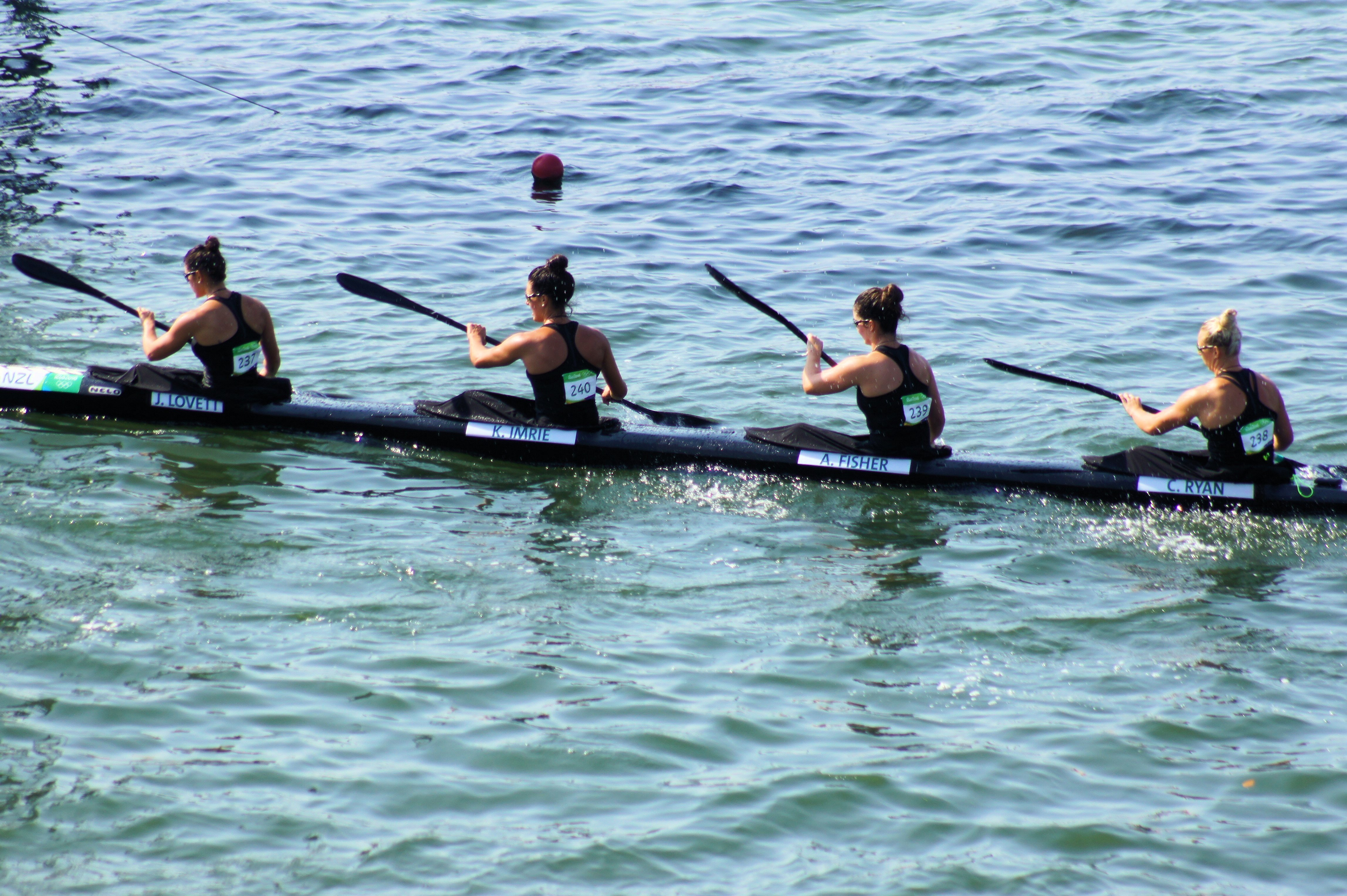
- Imrie in 2016

Personal information
- Born: 4 February 1992 (age 34) Lower Hutt, Wellington, New Zealand
- Height: 1.82 m (6 ft 0 in)
- Weight: 80 kg (176 lb)

Sport
- Country: New Zealand
- Sport: Canoe sprint
Medal record
Women's canoe sprint
Representing New Zealand
World Championships
Silver medal – second place	2018 Montemor-o-Velho	K-2 200 m
Silver medal – second place	2018 Montemor-o-Velho	K-4 500 m
Bronze medal – third place	2017 Račice	K-4 500 m

Kayla Imrie (born 4 February 1992) is a New Zealand canoeist.

She represented New Zealand at the 2016 Summer Olympics. She competed alongside Jaimee Lovett, Caitlin Ryan and Aimee Fisher in the Women's K-4 500 metres event. After having trained together for just 18 months, the young crew achieved a fifth place in the medal race.

Of Māori descent, Imrie affiliates to Whakatōhea.
