= Danuta Kozák =

Hungarian kayaker (born 1987)

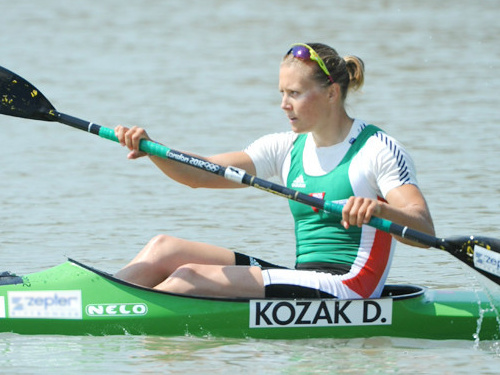
- Kozák in 2013

Personal information
- Nationality: Hungarian
- Born: 11 January 1987 (age 39) Budapest, Hungary
- Height: 1.72 m (5 ft 8 in)
- Weight: 64 kg (141 lb)

Sport
- Country: Hungary
- Sport: Sprint kayak
- Club: KSI (1996–08); Bp. Honvéd (2009–12); Újpesti TE (2013–20); Ferencvárosi TC (2021– )
- Coached by: Béla Somogyi
Medal record
Event	1st	2nd	3rd
Olympic Games	6	1	1
World Championships	15	3	2
European Championships	17	8	1
European Games	3	3	1
Total	41	15	5
Olympic Games
Gold medal – first place	2012 London	K-1 500 m
Gold medal – first place	2012 London	K-4 500 m
Gold medal – first place	2016 Rio de Janeiro	K-2 500 m
Gold medal – first place	2016 Rio de Janeiro	K-1 500 m
Gold medal – first place	2016 Rio de Janeiro	K-4 500 m
Gold medal – first place	2020 Tokyo	K-4 500 m
Silver medal – second place	2008 Beijing	K-4 500 m
Bronze medal – third place	2020 Tokyo	K-2 500 m
World Championships
Gold medal – first place	2009 Dartmouth	K-2 500 m
Gold medal – first place	2009 Dartmouth	K-4 500 m
Gold medal – first place	2010 Poznań	K-2 500 m
Gold medal – first place	2011 Szeged	K-2 200 m
Gold medal – first place	2011 Szeged	K-4 500 m
Gold medal – first place	2013 Duisburg	K-1 500 m
Gold medal – first place	2013 Duisburg	K-4 500 m
Gold medal – first place	2013 Duisburg	K-1 4×200 m
Gold medal – first place	2014 Moscow	K-1 500 m
Gold medal – first place	2014 Moscow	K-4 500 m
Gold medal – first place	2015 Milan	K-2 500 m
Gold medal – first place	2018 Montemor-o-Velho	K-1 500 m
Gold medal – first place	2018 Montemor-o-Velho	K-2 500 m
Gold medal – first place	2018 Montemor-o-Velho	K-4 500 m
Gold medal – first place	2021 Copenhagen	K-2 500 m
Silver medal – second place	2011 Szeged	K-1 500 m
Silver medal – second place	2015 Milan	K-4 500 m
Silver medal – second place	2021 Copenhagen	K-4 500 m
Bronze medal – third place	2007 Duisburg	K-2 1000 m
Bronze medal – third place	2019 Szeged	K-1 500 m
European Games
Gold medal – first place	2015 Baku	K-1 500 m
Gold medal – first place	2015 Baku	K-4 500 m
Gold medal – first place	2019 Minsk	K-4 500 m
Silver medal – second place	2019 Minsk	K-1 200 m
Silver medal – second place	2019 Minsk	K-1 500 m
Silver medal – second place	2019 Minsk	K-2 500 m
Bronze medal – third place	2015 Baku	K-1 200 m
European Championships
Gold medal – first place	2007 Pontevedra	K-2 1000 m
Gold medal – first place	2008 Milan	K-2 500 m
Gold medal – first place	2008 Milan	K-4 200 m
Gold medal – first place	2009 Brandenburg	K-2 500 m
Gold medal – first place	2010 Trasona	K-1 500 m
Gold medal – first place	2011 Belgrade	K-1 500 m
Gold medal – first place	2011 Belgrade	K-2 200 m
Gold medal – first place	2013 Montemor-o-Velho	K-4 500 m
Gold medal – first place	2014 Brandenburg	K-1 200 m
Gold medal – first place	2014 Brandenburg	K-1 500 m
Gold medal – first place	2014 Brandenburg	K-4 500 m
Gold medal – first place	2016 Moscow	K-1 500 m
Gold medal – first place	2016 Moscow	K-2 500 m
Gold medal – first place	2016 Moscow	K-4 500 m
Gold medal – first place	2018 Belgrade	K-1 500 m
Gold medal – first place	2018 Belgrade	K-4 500 m
Gold medal – first place	2021 Poznań	K-2 500 m
Silver medal – second place	2008 Milan	K-4 500 m
Silver medal – second place	2009 Brandenburg	K-1 4×200 m
Silver medal – second place	2010 Trasona	K-4 500 m
Silver medal – second place	2011 Belgrade	K-4 500 m
Silver medal – second place	2012 Zagreb	K-1 500 m
Silver medal – second place	2013 Montemor-o-Velho	K-1 500 m
Silver medal – second place	2018 Belgrade	K-1 200 m
Silver medal – second place	2021 Poznań	K-1 500 m
Bronze medal – third place	2012 Zagreb	K-4 500 m

Danuta Kozák (Hungarian pronunciation: [ˈdɒnutɒ ˈkozaːk]; born 11 January 1987) is a Hungarian sprint canoeist. She has won one silver, one bronze and six Olympic gold medals, three of which in Rio de Janeiro in 2016, making her the first female to win K1, K2 and K4 at the same Olympics (a record equalled in 2024 by Dame Lisa Carrington). At the 2020 Summer Olympics, she won a gold medal in Women's K-4 500 metres, and bronze medal in Women's K-2 500 metres.

== Career ==
Kozák has competed since the late 2000s. She won a silver medal in the K-4 500 m event at the 2008 Summer Olympics in Beijing. Kozák then won a gold medal at the London Olympics in the Kayak Four (K4) 500m team event with Gabriella Szabó, Katalin Kovács and Krisztina Fazekas Zur for Hungary. She also won the gold medal in the Kayak Single (K1) 500m. She won three gold medals in the Kayak Single (K1) 500m, Kayak Pairs (K2) 500m and Kayak Four (K4) 500m at the Rio de Janeiro Olympics; a feat compounded with her reeling from a stomach infection one day before the events. The latter results made her the most successful Hungarian sprint canoer and the only female athlete to win K1, K2 and K4 at the same Olympics.

Kozák has also won eighteen medals at the ICF Canoe Sprint World Championships with fourteen golds (K-1 500 m: 2013, 2014, 2018; K-2 200 m: 2011; K-2 500 m: 2009, 2010, 2015, 2018; K-4 500 m: 2009, 2011, 2013, 2014, 2018 and K-1 200 m relay: 2013), two silvers (K-1 500 m: 2011 and K-4 500 m: 2015) and two bronzes (K-1 500 m: 2019, K-2 1000 m: 2007).

== Awards ==
- Junior Príma award (2008)
- KSI SE – Athlete of Year (2008)
- Hungarian kayaker of the Year (5): 2011, 2012, 2013, 2014, 2016
- Perpetual champion of Hungarian Kayak-Canoe (2011)
- Honorary Citizen of Budapest (2012)
- Honorary Citizen of Újpest (2016)

Orders and special awards

- Order of Merit of the Republic of Hungary – Knight's Cross (2008)
- Order of Merit of Hungary – Officer's Cross (2012)
- Order of Merit of Hungary – Commander's Cross with Star (2016)

== Personal life ==
Her mother is of Polish descent.

== See also ==
- List of multiple Olympic gold medalists

Awards
Preceded by Katinka Hosszú	Hungarian Sportswoman of The Year; 2018	Succeeded by Katinka Hosszú
