= Aimee Fisher =

New Zealand canoeist (born 1995)

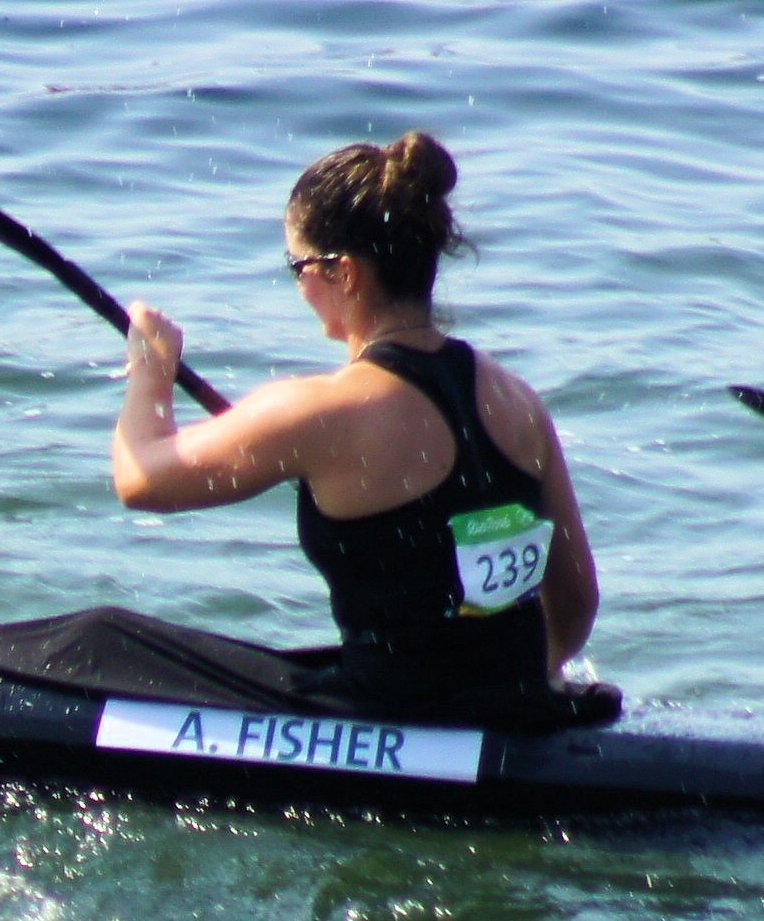
- Fisher at the 2016 Summer Olympics

Personal information
- Nationality: New Zealand
- Born: 24 January 1995 (age 31) Rotorua, New Zealand
- Height: 1.83 m (6 ft 0 in)
- Weight: 87 kg (192 lb)

Sport
- Country: New Zealand
- Sport: Sprint kayak
- Club: Hawke's Bay
Medal record
Women's sprint kayak
Representing New Zealand
World Championships
Gold medal – first place	2021 Copenhagen	K-1 500 m
Silver medal – second place	2018 Montemor-o-Velho	K-2 200 m
Silver medal – second place	2018 Montemor-o-Velho	K-4 500 m
Silver medal – second place	2026 Poznań	K-1 500 m
Bronze medal – third place	2017 Račice	K-4 500 m
Bronze medal – third place	2025 Milan	K-1 1000 m

Aimee Fisher (born 24 January 1995) is a New Zealand sprint canoeist.

== Career ==
Fisher was born in Rotorua. She represented New Zealand at the 2016 Summer Olympics, where she competed alongside Jaimee Lovett, Caitlin Ryan and Kayla Imrie in the women's K-4 500 metres event finishing fifth in the final.
