= Geraldine Lee =

Singaporean kayaker

Geraldine Lee Wei Ling (born 19 June 1987) is a Singaporean kayaker. During the 2012 Summer Olympics, she represented Singapore in the Women's Kayak Single (K1) 200m and Women's Kayak Single (K1) 500m.
