= Franziska John =

German canoeist (born 1989)

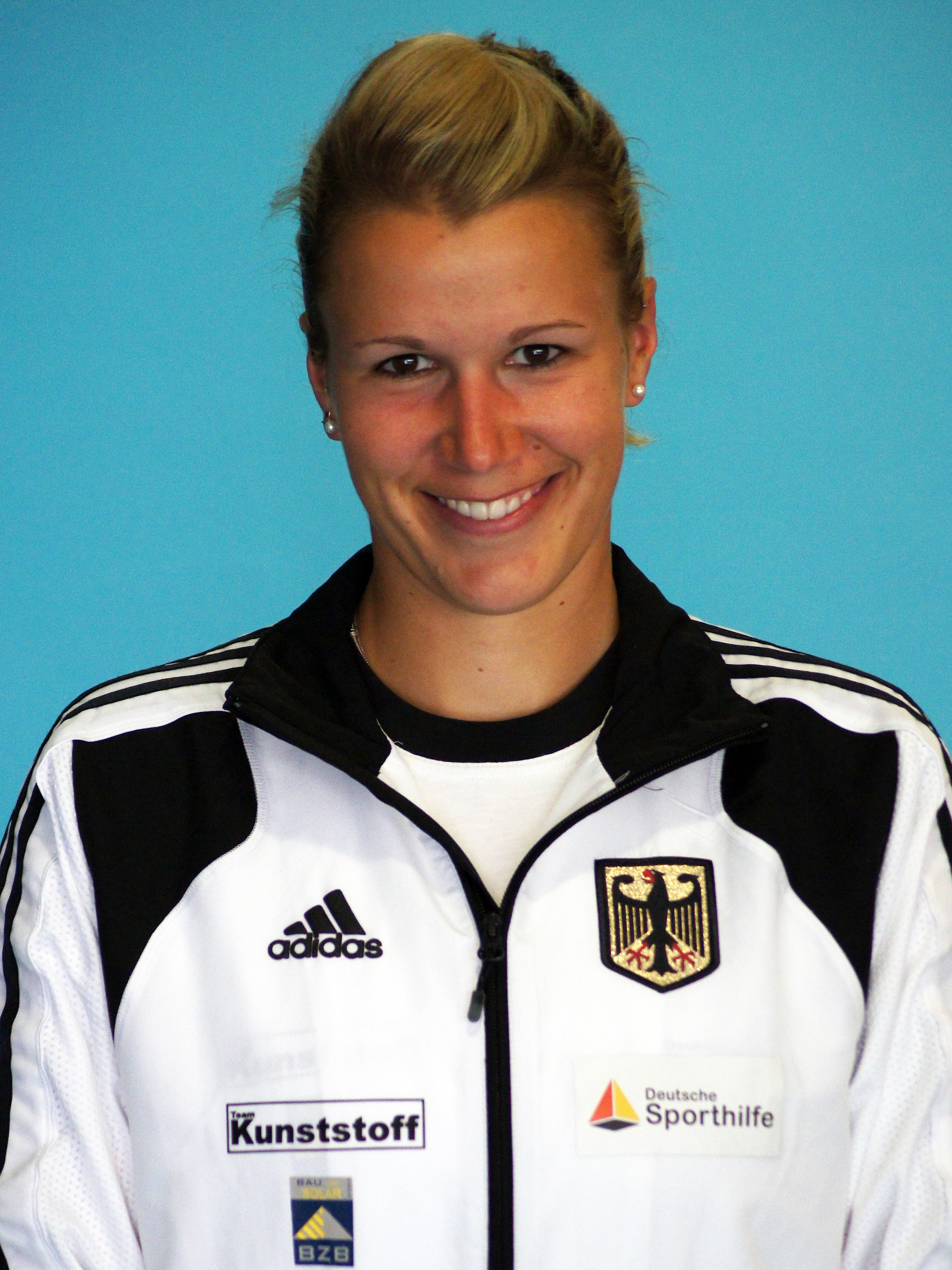
- 2012

Personal information
- Born: 24 May 1989 (age 37) Potsdam, East Germany
- Height: 1.76 m (5 ft 9 in)
- Weight: 70 kg (154 lb)

Sport
- Country: Germany
- Sport: Canoe sprint
- Club: KC Potsdam
Medal record
Women's canoe sprint
Representing Germany
Olympic Games
Gold medal – first place	2012 London	K-2 500 m
Silver medal – second place	2012 London	K-4 500 m
Silver medal – second place	2016 Rio de Janeiro	K-2 500 m
Silver medal – second place	2016 Rio de Janeiro	K-4 500 m
World Championships
Gold medal – first place	2010 Poznań	K-1 1000 m
Gold medal – first place	2013 Duisburg	K-2 200 m
Gold medal – first place	2013 Duisburg	K-2 500 m
Gold medal – first place	2018 Montemor-o-Velho	K-2 200 m
Silver medal – second place	2009 Dartmouth	K-1 1000 m
Silver medal – second place	2011 Szeged	K-2 500 m
Silver medal – second place	2011 Szeged	K-4 500 m
Silver medal – second place	2013 Duisburg	K-4 500 m
Silver medal – second place	2014 Moscow	K-2 200 m
Silver medal – second place	2017 Račice	K-2 500 m
Silver medal – second place	2017 Račice	K-4 500 m
Bronze medal – third place	2015 Milan	K-2 500 m
Bronze medal – third place	2015 Milan	K-4 500 m
European Games
Silver medal – second place	2015 Baku	K-4 500 m
Silver medal – second place	2019 Minsk	K-2 200 m
European Championships
Gold medal – first place	2010 Trasona	K-1 1000 m
Gold medal – first place	2012 Zagreb	K-2 200 m
Gold medal – first place	2012 Zagreb	K-4 500 m
Gold medal – first place	2015 Račice	K-1 1000 m
Gold medal – first place	2016 Moscow	K-2 200 m
Gold medal – first place	2017 Plovdiv	K-2 500 m
Silver medal – second place	2009 Brandenburg	K-1 1000 m
Silver medal – second place	2011 Belgrade	K-2 200 m
Silver medal – second place	2011 Belgrade	K-2 1000 m
Silver medal – second place	2013 Montemor-o-Velho	K-2 500 m
Silver medal – second place	2013 Montemor-o-Velho	K-4 500 m
Silver medal – second place	2014 Brandenburg	K-1 500 m
Silver medal – second place	2015 Račice	K-1 500 m
Silver medal – second place	2016 Moscow	K-1 500 m
Bronze medal – third place	2009 Brandenburg	K-2 500 m
Bronze medal – third place	2011 Belgrade	K-4 500 m
Bronze medal – third place	2016 Moscow	K-4 500 m

Franziska John (née Weber, born 24 May 1989) is a German sprint canoer who has competed since the late 2000s.

== Career ==
She was Olympic Champion at the 2012 Summer Olympics in the K-2 500 metres with Tina Dietze. At the same Olympics, she also won silver in the K-4 500 m. At the 2016 Summer Olympics, she finished 5th in the women's K-1 500 metres event. She won the silver medal in the women's K-2 500 metres event with teammate Tina Dietze. She also competed as part of the women's K-4 500 metres team which earned the silver medal.

She has won 12 medals at the ICF Canoe Sprint World Championships, 3 golds (K-1 1000 m: 2010; K-2 200 m: 2013; K-2 500 m: 2013), 7 silvers (K-1 1000 m: 2009; K-2 500 m: 2011, 2017; K-2 200 m: 2014; K-4 500 m: 2011, 2013, 2017) and 2 bronzes (K-2 500 m: 2015; K-4 500 m: 2015).

In June 2015, she competed in the inaugural European Games, for Germany in canoe sprint, more specifically, Women's K-4 500m with Verena Hantl, Conny Wassmuth, and Tina Dietze. She earned a silver medal.

She first began canoeing in 1999, and made her international debut in 2009. She has a degree in Civil Engineering from the University of Potsdam.
