= Karin Johansson =

Swedish canoeist (born 1986)

Medal record

Women's canoe sprint

Representing Sweden

World Championships
Silver medal – second place	2017 Račice	K-1 1000 m
Bronze medal – third place	2006 Szeged	K-4 200 m

European Championships
Bronze medal – third place	2018 Belgrade	K-1 1000 m

Karin Johansson (born 1986) is a Swedish sprint canoer who has competed since the late 2000s. She won a bronze medal in the K-4 200 m event at the 2006 ICF Canoe Sprint World Championships in Szeged. Her home club is Örebro KF.
