= Tina Dietze =

German sprint canoer

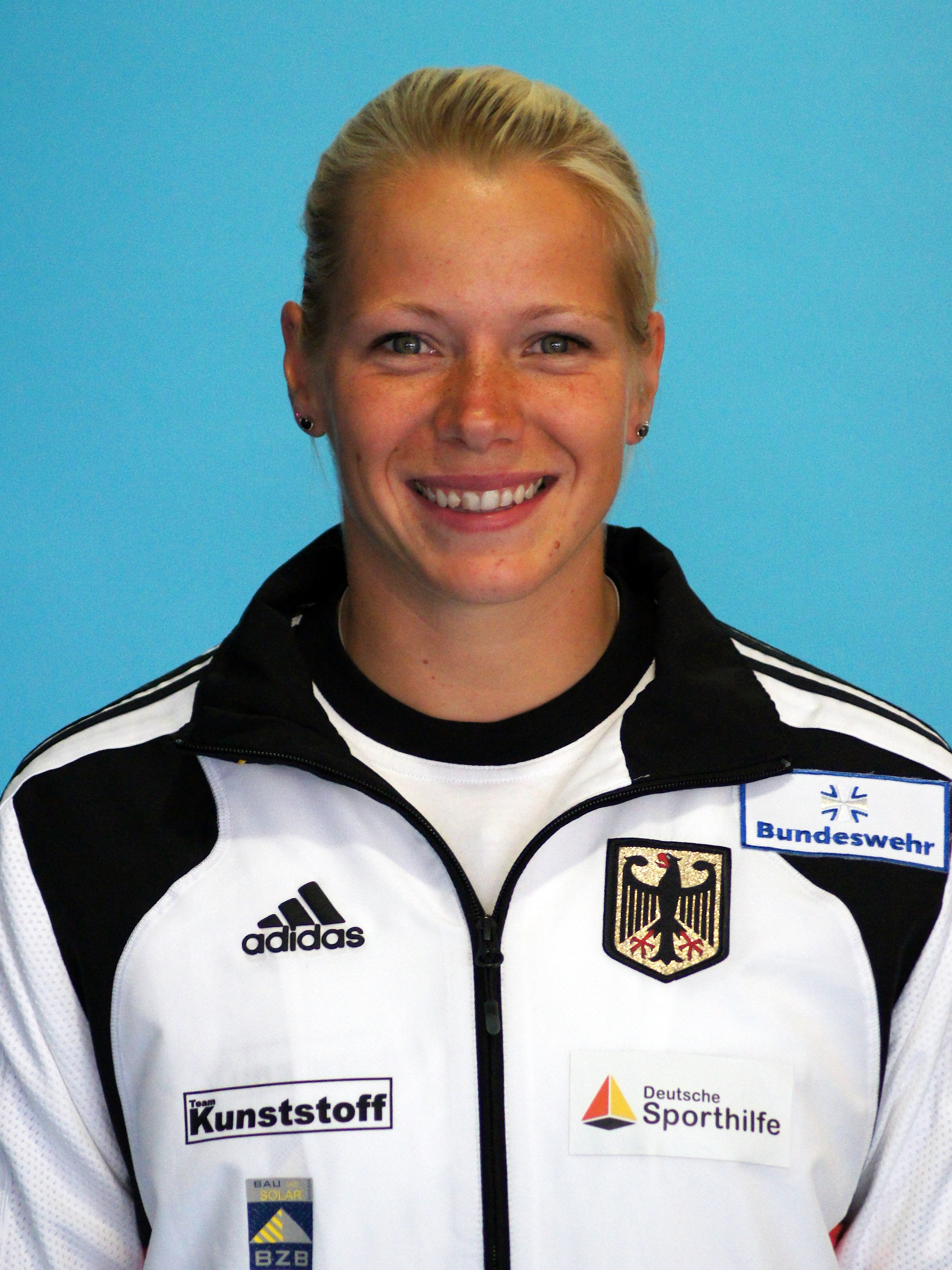

Personal information
- Born: 25 January 1988 (age 38) Leipzig, East Germany
- Height: 1.72 m (5 ft 8 in)
- Weight: 69 kg (152 lb)

Sport
- Country: Germany
- Sport: Canoe sprint
- Club: SG LVB Leipzig
Medal record
Women's canoe sprint
Representing Germany
Olympic Games
Gold medal – first place	2012 London	K-2 500 m
Silver medal – second place	2012 London	K-4 500 m
Silver medal – second place	2016 Rio de Janeiro	K-2 500 m
Silver medal – second place	2016 Rio de Janeiro	K-4 500 m
World Championships
Gold medal – first place	2009 Dartmouth	K-4 200 m
Gold medal – first place	2010 Poznań	K-1 4 x 200 m
Gold medal – first place	2011 Szeged	K-1 4 x 200 m
Gold medal – first place	2013 Duisburg	K-2 500 m
Gold medal – first place	2013 Duisburg	K-2 200 m
Gold medal – first place	2018 Montemor-o-Velho	K-2 200 m
Silver medal – second place	2009 Dartmouth	K-2 1000 m
Silver medal – second place	2009 Dartmouth	K-4 500 m
Silver medal – second place	2010 Poznań	K-4 500 m
Silver medal – second place	2011 Szeged	K-2 500 m
Silver medal – second place	2011 Szeged	K-4 500 m
Silver medal – second place	2013 Duisburg	K-4 500 m
Silver medal – second place	2014 Moscow	K-2 200 m
Silver medal – second place	2017 Račice	K-2 500 m
Silver medal – second place	2017 Račice	K-4 500 m
Bronze medal – third place	2015 Milan	K-2 500 m
Bronze medal – third place	2015 Milan	K-4 500 m
European Games
Silver medal – second place	2015 Baku	K-4 500 m
Silver medal – second place	2019 Minsk	K-2 200 m
European Championships
Gold medal – first place	2009 Brandenburg	K-4 500 m
Gold medal – first place	2010 Trasona	K-4 500 m
Gold medal – first place	2012 Zagreb	K-2 200 m
Gold medal – first place	2012 Zagreb	K-4 500 m
Gold medal – first place	2016 Moscow	K-2 200 m
Gold medal – first place	2017 Plovdiv	K-2 500 m
Silver medal – second place	2009 Brandenburg	K-4 200 m
Silver medal – second place	2011 Belgrade	K-2 200 m
Silver medal – second place	2011 Belgrade	K-2 1000 m
Silver medal – second place	2013 Montemor-o-Velho	K-2 500 m
Silver medal – second place	2013 Montemor-o-Velho	K-4 500 m
Bronze medal – third place	2010 Trasona	K-2 1000 m
Bronze medal – third place	2011 Belgrade	K-4 500 m
Bronze medal – third place	2016 Moscow	K-4 500 m

Tina Dietze (born 25 January 1988) is a German sprint canoer who has competed since the late 2000s. She won the gold medal in K-2 (with Franziska Weber) and the silver medal in K-4 at the 2012 Olympic Games.

== Career ==
She won 14 medals at the ICF Canoe Sprint World Championships with five golds (K-1 4 x 200 m: 2010, K-4 200 m: 2009, K-2 200 m and K-2 500 m: 2013).

In June 2015, she competed in the inaugural European Games, for Germany in canoe sprint, more specifically, in the Women's K-4 500m with Verena Hantl, Franziska Weber, and Conny Wassmuth. She earned a silver medal.

At the 2016 Summer Olympics, she won the silver medal in the women's K-2 500 metres event with teammate Franziska Weber. She also won a silver medal as part of the women's K-4 500 metres team.
