= Julie Funch =

Danish canoeist (born 1997)

Personal information
- Full name: Julie Frølund Funch
- Born: 6 February 1997 (age 29)

Sport
- Sport: Canoe sprint
Medal record
Women's canoe sprint
Representing Denmark
European Championships
Bronze medal – third place	2021 Poznań	K-4 500 m

Julie Frølund Funch (born 6 February 1997) is a Danish canoeist. She competed in the women's K-2 500 metres and the K-4 500 metres events at the 2020 Summer Olympics.
