= Deborah Kerr (canoeist) =

British canoeist

Personal information
- Born: 17 November 1997 (age 28) Carluke, Great Britain
- Height: 1.73 m (5 ft 8 in)

Sport
- Country: Great Britain
- Sport: Canoe sprint

Deborah Kerr (born 17 November 1997) is a British canoeist. She competed in the women's K-1 200 metres and the K-1 500 metres events at the 2020 Summer Olympics.
