= Hannah Brown (canoeist) =

British canoeist

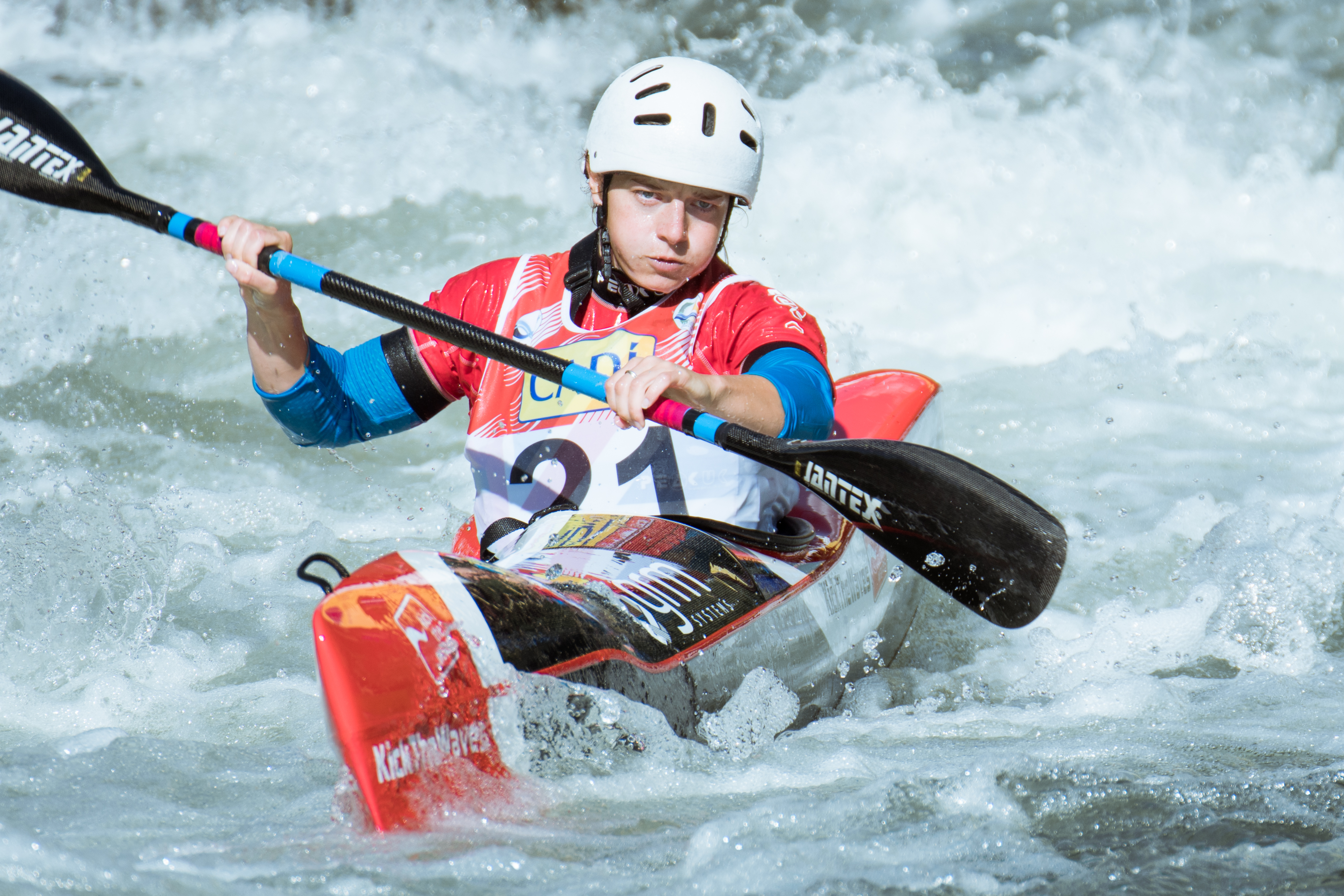
- Brown in 2019

Personal information
- Nickname: Brownie
- Nationality: British
- Born: 20 February 1990 (age 36) United Kingdom
- Height: 1.66 m (5 ft 5 in)
- Weight: 68 kg (150 lb)

Sport
- Sport: Canoeing
- Events: Canoe sprint; Wildwater canoeing
- Club: Bradford on Avon Canoe Club
Medal record
Wildwater canoeing
Event	1st	2nd	3rd
World Championships	2	0	1
Canoe sprint
Event	1st	2nd	3rd
World Championships	0	0	1

Hannah Brown (born 20 February 1990) is a British female canoeist who won three medals at senior level at the Wildwater Canoeing World Championships and one at the Canoe Sprint World Championships.

== Medals at the World Championships ==
Senior

Year	1st place, gold medalist(s)	2nd place, silver medalist(s)	3rd place, bronze medalist(s)
Wildwater canoeing
2010	0	2	0
2013	1	0	0
2016	1	0	0
2017	0	0	1
Canoe sprint
2017	0	0	1
