= Beata Mikołajczyk =

Polish canoeist (born 1985)

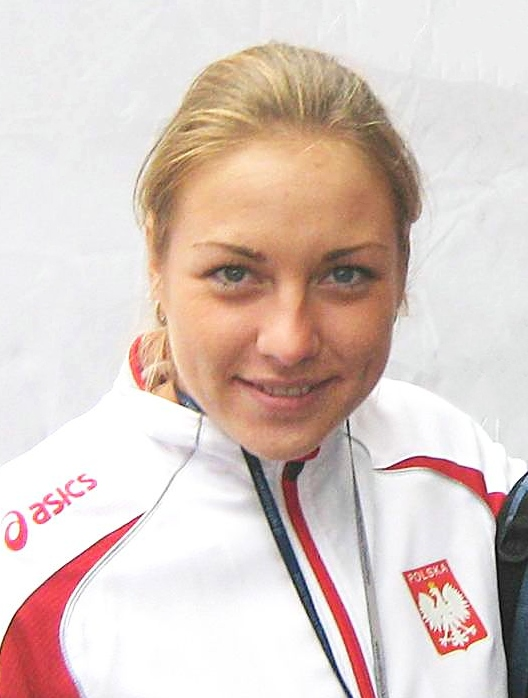
- Mikołajczyk in 2008

Personal information
- Born: 15 October 1985 (age 40) Bydgoszcz, Poland
- Height: 170 cm (5 ft 7 in)
- Weight: 68 kg (150 lb)

Sport
- Sport: Canoe sprint
- Club: UKS Kopernik
- Coached by: Wieslaw Rakowski (club); Tomas Kryk (national)
Medal record
Representing Poland
Event	1st	2nd	3rd
Olympic Games	0	1	2
World Championships	1	2	3
European Championships	4	6	3
European Games	0	0	1
Total	5	9	9
Olympic Games
Silver medal – second place	2008 Beijing	K-2 500 m
Bronze medal – third place	2012 London	K-2 500 m
Bronze medal – third place	2016 Rio de Janeiro	K-2 500 m
World Championships
Gold medal – first place	2009 Dartmouth	K-2 1000 m
Silver medal – second place	2013 Duisburg	K-2 200 m
Silver medal – second place	2014 Moscow	K-4 500 m
Bronze medal – third place	2011 Szeged	K-2 500 m
Bronze medal – third place	2013 Duisburg	K-2 500 m
Bronze medal – third place	2014 Moscow	K-2 500 m
European Championships
Gold medal – first place	2005 Poznań	K-4 1000 m
Gold medal – first place	2012 Zagreb	K-2 1000 m
Gold medal – first place	2013 Montemor-o-Velho	K-2 500 m
Gold medal – first place	2013 Montemor-o-Velho	K-2 1000 m
Gold medal – first place	2015 Račice	K-2 500 m
Silver medal – second place	2006 Račice	K1-500m
Silver medal – second place	2008 Milan	K-4 1000 m
Silver medal – second place	2011 Belgrade	K-2 500 m
Silver medal – second place	2014 Brandenburg	K-2 500 m
Silver medal – second place	2014 Brandenburg	K-4 500 m
Silver medal – second place	2015 Račice	K-2 200 m
Silver medal – second place	2015 Račice	K-2 1000 m
Silver medal – second place	2017 Plovdiv	K-1 1000 m
Silver medal – second place	2017 Plovdiv	K-4 500 m
Bronze medal – third place	2005 Poznań	K-4 1000 m
Bronze medal – third place	2010 Trasona	K-4 500 m
Bronze medal – third place	2012 Zagreb	K-2 500 m
Silver medal – second place	2017 Plovdiv	K-2 500 m
European Games
Bronze medal – third place	2015 Baku	K-4 500 m

Beata Mikołajczyk (Polish pronunciation: [bɛˈata mikɔˈwajt͡ʂɨk]; born 15 October 1985) is a Polish canoe sprinter. She competed at the 2008, 2012 and 2016 Olympics, in two events for each games; she won one silver and two bronze medals and placed fourth two times.

== Career ==
Mikołajczyk took up canoeing in 1996 in her native Bydgoszcz. She won the silver medal in K-2 500 m event at the 2008 Summer Olympics in Beijing with Aneta Pastuszka-Konieczna. She won the bronze medal in K-2 500 m event at the 2012 Summer Olympics in London with Karolina Naja. She also won a gold in the K-2 1000 m event at the 2009 ICF Canoe Sprint World Championships in Dartmouth.

In June 2015, she competed in the inaugural European Games for Poland in canoe sprint, more specifically, Women's K-4 500m with Ewelina Wojnarowska, Edyta Dzieniszewska, and Karolina Naja. She earned a bronze medal.

== Awards ==
For her sport achievements, she received:

- Golden Cross of Merit in 2008.
- Knight's Cross Order of Polonia Restituta in 2013.
