= Angela Hannah =

British canoeist (born 1986)

Personal information
- Born: 24 March 1986 (age 40) Harare, Zimbabwe
Medal record
Women's canoe sprint
Representing Great Britain
World Championships
Bronze medal – third place	2017 Račice	K-2 200 m
European Championships
Bronze medal – third place	2014 Brandenburg	K-2 200 m

Angela Hannah (born 24 March 1986 in Harare, Zimbabwe) is a British canoe sprinter who has competed since 2007. In the 2012 European Championships she finished 4th in the K4 500m event. She is part of the women's K4 500 m Great Britain team for the 2012 Olympics.
