= Léa Jamelot =

French canoeist (born 1992)

Personal information
- Born: 28 November 1992 (age 33) Obernai, France

Sport
- Sport: Canoe sprint

Léa Jamelot (born 28 November 1992) is a French canoeist. She competed in the women's K-4 500 metres event at the 2016 Summer Olympics.
