= Sarah Troël =

French canoeist (born 1986)

Personal information
- Born: 12 July 1986 (age 40) Rennes, France

Sport
- Sport: Canoe sprint

Sarah Troël (born 12 July 1986) is a French canoeist. She competed in the women's K-4 500 metres event at the 2016 Summer Olympics.
