= Inna Hryshchun =

Ukrainian canoeist (born 1994)

Personal information
- Nationality: Ukrainian
- Born: Інна Грищун; 29 September 1994 (age 31) Khmelnytskyi, Ukraine

Sport
- Country: Ukraine
- Sport: Canoe sprint
Medal record
Representing Ukraine
European Championships
Silver medal – second place	2015 Račice	K-4 500m
Bronze medal – third place	2017 Plovdiv	K-4 500m

Inna Hryshchun (born 29 September 1994 in Khmelnytskyi) is a Ukrainian canoeist. She competed in the women's K-2 500 metres event at the 2016 Summer Olympics. She also won medals at the European Championships.
