= Anastasiia Todorova =

Ukrainian canoeist (born 1993)

Personal information
- Nationality: Ukrainian
- Born: Анастасі́я Ігорівна Тодорова; 10 December 1993 (age 32)

Sport
- Country: Ukraine
- Sport: Canoe sprint
Medal record
Representing Ukraine
European Games
Bronze medal – third place	2015 Baku	K-2 200m
European Championships
Silver medal – second place	2015 Račice	K-4 500m
Bronze medal – third place	2017 Plovdiv	K-4 500m

Anastasiia Ihorivna Todorova (Ukrainian: Анастасія Ігорівна Тодорова; born 10 December 1993) is a Ukrainian canoeist. She competed in the women's K-2 500 metres event at the 2016 Summer Olympics. She also won medals at the European Championships.
