= Mariya Povkh =

Ukrainian canoeist (born 1989)

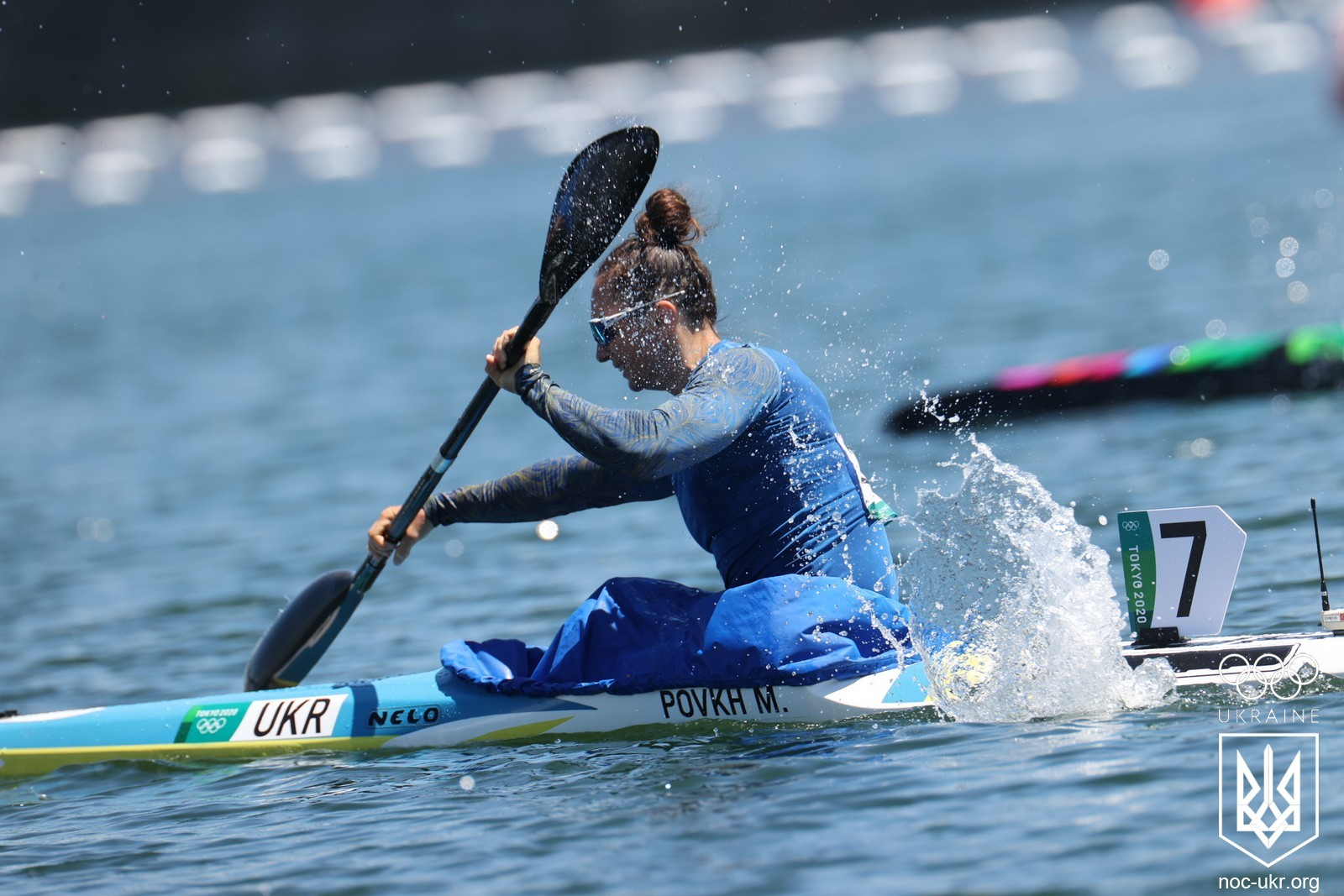
- Povkh at the 2020 Summer Olympics

Personal information
- Full name: Mariya Mykolayivna Povkh
- Nationality: Ukrainian
- Born: 8 January 1989 (age 37)
- Height: 1.66 m (5 ft 5 in)
- Weight: 64 kg (141 lb)

Sport
- Country: Ukraine
- Sport: Canoe
Medal record
Women's canoe sprint
Representing Ukraine
European Games
Gold medal – first place	2019 Minsk	K-2 200 m
Bronze medal – third place	2015 Baku	K-2 200 m
European Championships
Silver medal – second place	2015 Račice	K-4 500 m
Bronze medal – third place	2017 Plovdiv	K-4 500 m
Bronze medal – third place	2021 Poznań	K-1 500 m

Mariya Mykolayivna Povkh (Марі́я Микола́ївна По́вх; born 8 January 1989) is a Ukrainian canoeist. She represented her country at the 2016 Summer Olympics. She also won medals at the European Championships.
