= Canoe sprint at the 2019 European Games =

- Venue: Zaslavl Regatta Course
- Dates: 25–27 June
- Competitors: 341 from 37 nations

At the 2019 European Games in Minsk, sixteen medal events in canoe sprint were contested between 25 and 27 June 2019, of which five are Canadian canoe events and eleven are kayak events.

In contrast to 2015, this competition effectively replaced the 2019 Canoe Sprint European Championships (which the ECA chose not to organise).

== Qualification ==
There were a total of 350 athlete quota places available for canoe sprint at the 2019 European Games; 175 each for men and women.

The sole qualification event was the 2018 Canoe Sprint European Championships in Belgrade between 8 and 10 June 2018.

== Competition schedule ==
H	Heats	½	Semifinals	F	Final

Men
Event↓/Date →	Tue 25		Wed 26		Thu 27
C-1 200 m			H	½	F
C-1 1000 m	H	½	F		
C-2 1000 m	H	½	F		
K-1 200 m			H	½	F
K-1 1000 m	H	½	F		
K-1 5000 m					F
K-2 1000 m	H	½	F		
K-4 500 m	H	½			F

Women
Event↓/Date →	Tue 25		Wed 26		Thu 27
C-1 200 m			H	½	F
C-2 500 m	H	½			F
K-1 200 m			H	½	F
K-1 500 m	H	½			F
K-1 5000 m					F
K-2 200 m			H	½	F
K-2 500 m	H	½	F		
K-4 500 m	H	½			F

== Medalists ==
=== Men ===
Event	Gold	Silver	Bronze
C-1 200 m	Artsem Kozyr; Belarus	Nicolae Craciun; Italy	Alfonso Benavides; Spain
C-1 1000 m	Tomasz Kaczor; Poland	Kirill Shamshurin; Russia	Sebastian Brendel; Germany
C-2 1000 m	Romania (ROU); Cătălin Chirilă; Victor Mihalachi	Ukraine (UKR); Andrii Rybachok; Yurii Vandiuk	Russia (RUS); Ilya Pervukhin; Kirill Shamshurin
K-1 200 m	Maxime Beaumont; France	Balázs Birkás; Hungary	Dzmitry Tratsiakou; Belarus
K-1 1000 m	Bálint Kopasz; Hungary	Fernando Pimenta; Portugal	Aleh Yurenia; Belarus
K-1 5000 m	Bálint Kopasz; Hungary	Fernando Pimenta; Portugal	Max Hoff; Germany
K-2 1000 m	Germany (GER); Max Hoff; Jacob Schopf	Ukraine (UKR); Oleh Kukharyk; Oleksandr Syromiatnykov	Russia (RUS); Roman Anoshkin; Vladislav Litovka
K-4 500 m	Russia (RUS); Artem Kuzakhmetov; Aleksandr Sergeyev; Oleg Gusev; Vitaly Ershov	Germany (GER); Max Rendschmidt; Ronald Rauhe; Tom Liebscher; Max Lemke	Slovakia (SVK); Samuel Baláž; Erik Vlček; Csaba Zalka; Adam Botek

=== Women ===
Event	Gold	Silver	Bronze
C-1 200 m	Alena Nazdrova; Belarus	Lisa Jahn; Germany	Dorota Borowska; Poland
C-2 500 m	Hungary (HUN); Virág Balla; Kincső Takács	Belarus (BLR); Nadzeya Makarchanka; Volha Klimava	Russia (RUS); Kseniia Kurach; Olesia Romasenko
K-1 200 m	Emma Jørgensen; Denmark	Danuta Kozák; Hungary	Marta Walczykiewicz; Poland
K-1 500 m	Volha Khudzenka; Belarus	Danuta Kozák; Hungary	Emma Jørgensen; Denmark
K-1 5000 m	Maryna Litvinchuk; Belarus	Dóra Bodonyi; Hungary	Marianna Petrušová; Slovakia
K-2 200 m	Ukraine (UKR); Mariya Povkh; Liudmyla Kuklinovska	Germany (GER); Franziska John; Tina Dietze	Belarus (BLR); Volha Khudzenka; Maryna Litvinchuk
K-2 500 m	Belarus (BLR); Volha Khudzenka; Maryna Litvinchuk	Hungary (HUN); Anna Kárász; Danuta Kozák	Russia (RUS); Anastasia Panchenko; Kira Stepanova
K-4 500 m	Hungary (HUN); Anna Kárász; Danuta Kozák; Tamara Csipes; Erika Medveczky	Belarus (BLR); Marharyta Makhneva; Nadzeya Papok; Volha Khudzenka; Maryna Litvinchuk	Poland (POL); Karolina Naja; Katarzyna Kołodziejczyk; Anna Puławska; Helena Wiśniewska

== Medal table ==
* Host nation (Belarus)

Rank	Nation	Gold	Silver	Bronze	Total
1	Belarus*	5	2	3	10
2	Hungary	4	5	0	9
3	Germany	1	3	2	6
4	Ukraine	1	2	0	3
5	Russia	1	1	4	6
6	Poland	1	0	3	4
7	Denmark	1	0	1	2
8	France	1	0	0	1
8	Romania	1	0	0	1
10	Portugal	0	2	0	2
11	Italy	0	1	0	1
12	Slovakia	0	0	2	2
13	Spain	0	0	1	1
Totals (13 entries)		16	16	16	48

== Participating nations ==
A total of 341 athletes from 37 nations competed in canoe sprint at the 2019 European Games:

- Armenia (3)
- Austria (2)
- Azerbaijan (1)
- Belarus (24)
- Belgium (4)
- Bosnia and Herzegovina (1)
- Bulgaria (4)
- Croatia (3)
- Czech Republic (14)
- Denmark (7)
- Estonia (1)
- Finland (3)
- France (22)
- Georgia (3)
- Germany (25)
- Great Britain (4)
- Greece (3)
- Hungary (29)
- Ireland (2)
- Italy (16)
- Latvia (5)
- Lithuania (7)
- Moldova (5)
- North Macedonia (1)
- Norway (6)
- Poland (22)
- Portugal (14)
- Romania (13)
- Russia (20)
- Serbia (8)
- Slovakia (14)
- Slovenia (2)
- Spain (24)
- Sweden (8)
- Switzerland (1)
- Turkey (3)
- Ukraine (17)
