= 2019 ICF Canoe Sprint World Championships – Women's K-2 500 metres =

Women's K-2 500 metres at the 2019 ICF Canoe Sprint World Championships
- Venue: Olympic Centre of Szeged
- Location: Szeged, Hungary
- Dates: 22–24 August
- Competitors: 60 from 30 nations
- Winning time: 1:42.55

Medalists
gold medal	Maryna Litvinchuk; Volha Khudzenka	Belarus
silver medal	Karolina Naja; Anna Puławska	Poland
bronze medal	Špela Ponomarenko Janić; Anja Osterman	Slovenia

The women's K-2 500 metres competition at the 2019 ICF Canoe Sprint World Championships in Szeged took place at the Olympic Centre of Szeged.

== Schedule ==
The schedule was as follows:

Date	Time	Round
Thursday 22 August 2019	12:43	Heats
Thursday 22 August 2019	15:42	Semifinals
Saturday 24 August 2019	09:43	Final B
Saturday 24 August 2019	12:56	Final A

All times are Central European Summer Time (UTC+2)

== Results ==
=== Heats ===
The six fastest boats in each heat, plus the three fastest seventh-place boats advanced to the semifinals.

==== Heat 1 ====
Rank	Kayakers	Country	Time	Notes
1	Sarah Guyot; Manon Hostens	France	1:41.09	QS
2	Laia Pelachs; Aida Bauza	Spain	1:42.72	QS
3	Mariya Povkh; Liudmyla Kuklinovska	Ukraine	1:43.06	QS
4	Bridgitte Hartley; Donna Hutton	South Africa	1:43.69	QS
5	Kaitlyn McElroy; Samantha Barlow	United States	1:48.13	QS
6	Laura Skukauska; Katrina Smiltniece	Latvia	1:51.00	QS
–	Danuta Kozák; Anna Kárász	Hungary	DSQ	
–	Afef Ben Ismail; Khaoula Sassi	Tunisia	DNS	

==== Heat 2 ====
Rank	Kayakers	Country	Time	Notes
1	Maryna Litvinchuk; Volha Khudzenka	Belarus	1:37.88	QS
2	Karolina Naja; Anna Puławska	Poland	1:40.97	QS
3	Viktoria Schwarz; Ana Roxana Lehaci	Austria	1:43.20	QS
4	Florida Ciută; Roxana Ciur	Romania	1:43.39	QS
5	Lee Ha-lin; Lee Sun-ja	South Korea	1:45.32	QS
6	Chou Ju-chuan; Liu Hui-chi	Chinese Taipei	1:49.23	QS
7	Catherine McArthur; Brianna Massie	Australia	2:22.51	qS

==== Heat 3 ====
Rank	Kayakers	Country	Time	Notes
1	Anastasia Panchenko; Kira Stepanova	Russia	1:40.84	QS
2	Steffi Kriegerstein; Jasmin Fritz	Germany	1:41.77	QS
3	Caitlin Ryan; Alicia Hoskin	New Zealand	1:42.40	QS
4	Moa Wikberg; Melina Andersson	Sweden	1:42.63	QS
5	Pauliina Polet; Netta Malinen	Finland	1:43.00	QS
6	Ekaterina Shubina; Yuliya Borzova	Uzbekistan	1:44.97	QS
7	Aleksandra Grishina; Daniela Nedeva	Bulgaria	1:45.52	qS
8	Arezou Hakimimoghaddam; Hediyeh Kazemi	Iran	1:48.00	

==== Heat 4 ====
Rank	Kayakers	Country	Time	Notes
1	Hermien Peters; Lize Broekx	Belgium	1:39.54	QS
2	Yu Shimeng; Wang Nan	China	1:40.58	QS
3	Špela Ponomarenko Janić; Anja Osterman	Slovenia	1:41.07	QS
4	Courtney Stott; Natalie Davison	Canada	1:42.96	QS
5	Sarah Chen Jiemei; Stephenie Chen Jiexian	Singapore	1:48.13	QS
6	Sofia Campana; Susanna Cicali	Italy	1:50.10	QS
7	Amira Kheris; Anfel Arabi	Algeria	2:01.82	qS

=== Semifinals ===
Qualification in each semi was as follows:

The fastest three boats advanced to the A final.
The next three fastest boats advanced to the B final.

==== Semifinal 1 ====
Rank	Kayakers	Country	Time	Notes
1	Maryna Litvinchuk; Volha Khudzenka	Belarus	1:36.78	QA
2	Hermien Peters; Lize Broekx	Belgium	1:38.31	QA
3	Caitlin Ryan; Alicia Hoskin	New Zealand	1:38.93	QA
4	Laia Pelachs; Aida Bauza	Spain	1:41.02	QB
5	Moa Wikberg; Melina Andersson	Sweden	1:41.51	QB
6	Aleksandra Grishina; Daniela Nedeva	Bulgaria	1:46.15	QB
7	Sarah Chen Jiemei; Stephenie Chen Jiexian	Singapore	1:48.90	
8	Chou Ju-chuan; Liu Hui-chi	Chinese Taipei	1:49.59	
9	Laura Skukauska; Katrina Smiltniece	Latvia	1:49.89	

==== Semifinal 2 ====
Rank	Kayakers	Country	Time	Notes
1	Yu Shimeng; Wang Nan	China	1:39.56	QA
2	Mariya Povkh; Liudmyla Kuklinovska	Ukraine	1:39.76	QA
3	Viktoria Schwarz; Ana Roxana Lehaci	Austria	1:40.58	QA
4	Anastasia Panchenko; Kira Stepanova	Russia	1:40.85	QB
5	Courtney Stott; Natalie Davison	Canada	1:42.09	QB
6	Florida Ciută; Roxana Ciur	Romania	1:43.53	QB
7	Ekaterina Shubina; Yuliya Borzova	Uzbekistan	1:44.98	
8	Kaitlyn McElroy; Samantha Barlow	United States	1:48.00	
9	Amira Kheris; Anfel Arabi	Algeria	2:02.24	

==== Semifinal 3 ====
Rank	Kayakers	Country	Time	Notes
1	Špela Ponomarenko Janić; Anja Osterman	Slovenia	1:37.79	QA
2	Karolina Naja; Anna Puławska	Poland	1:38.02	QA
3	Sarah Guyot; Manon Hostens	France	1:38.77	QA
4	Steffi Kriegerstein; Jasmin Fritz	Germany	1:39.89	QB
5	Pauliina Polet; Netta Malinen	Finland	1:42.04	QB
6	Sofia Campana; Susanna Cicali	Italy	1:42.59	QB
7	Bridgitte Hartley; Donna Hutton	South Africa	1:43.16	
8	Catherine McArthur; Brianna Massie	Australia	1:43.17	
9	Lee Ha-lin; Lee Sun-ja	South Korea	1:48.45	

=== Finals ===
==== Final B ====
Competitors in this final raced for positions 10 to 18.

Rank	Kayakers	Country	Time
1	Steffi Kriegerstein; Jasmin Fritz	Germany	1:44.01
2	Anastasia Panchenko; Kira Stepanova	Russia	1:44.07
3	Laia Pelachs; Aida Bauza	Spain	1:46.63
4	Courtney Stott; Natalie Davison	Canada	1:46.82
5	Moa Wikberg; Melina Andersson	Sweden	1:47.58
6	Pauliina Polet; Netta Malinen	Finland	1:47.94
7	Sofia Campana; Susanna Cicali	Italy	1:49.31
8	Florida Ciută; Roxana Ciur	Romania	1:49.33
9	Aleksandra Grishina; Daniela Nedeva	Bulgaria	1:50.98

==== Final A ====
Competitors raced for positions 1 to 9, with medals going to the top three.

Rank	Kayakers	Country	Time
1st place, gold medalist(s)	Maryna Litvinchuk; Volha Khudzenka	Belarus	1:42.55
2nd place, silver medalist(s)	Karolina Naja; Anna Puławska	Poland	1:43.34
3rd place, bronze medalist(s)	Špela Ponomarenko Janić; Anja Osterman	Slovenia	1:44.21
4	Hermien Peters; Lize Broekx	Belgium	1:44.49
5	Sarah Guyot; Manon Hostens	France	1:44.90
6	Mariya Povkh; Liudmyla Kuklinovska	Ukraine	1:45.79
7	Yu Shimeng; Wang Nan	China	1:46.65
8	Viktoria Schwarz; Ana Roxana Lehaci	Austria	1:47.07
9	Caitlin Ryan; Alicia Hoskin	New Zealand	1:47.63
