= Canoe sprint at the 2015 European Games – Women's K-2 500 metres =

Women's K-2 500 metres at the 2015 European Games
- Venue: Kur Sport and Rowing Centre, Mingachevir
- Date: 14–16 June
- Competitors: 28 from 14 nations
- Winning time: 1:49.904

Medalists
gold medal	Milica Starović; Dalma Ružičić-Benedek	Serbia
silver medal	Roxana Borha; Elena Meroniac	Romania
bronze medal	Anna Kárász; Ninetta Vad	Hungary

The women's K-2 500 metres canoe sprint competition at the 2015 European Games in Baku took place between 14 and 16 June at the Kur Sport and Rowing Centre in Mingachevir.

== Schedule ==
The schedule was as follows:

Date	Time	Round
Sunday 14 June 2015	13:53	Heats
Sunday 14 June 2015	16:34	Semifinals
Tuesday 16 June 2015	11:37	Finals

All times are Azerbaijan Summer Time (UTC+5)

== Results ==
=== Heats ===
The fastest three boats in each heat advanced directly to the final. The next four fastest boats in each heat, plus the fastest remaining boat advanced to the semifinal.

==== Heat 1 ====
Rank	Kayakers	Country	Time	Notes
1	Franziska Weber; Tina Dietze	Germany	1:39.570	QF, GB
2	Karolina Naja; Beata Mikołajczyk	Poland	1:39.609	QF
3	Elena Aniushina; Svetlana Chernigovskaya	Russia	1:40.919	QF
4	Ana Varela; Isabel Contreras	Spain	1:42.433	QS
5	Anastasiya Horlova; Liudmyla Galushko	Ukraine	1:46.289	QS
6	Sofia Campana; Norma Murabito	Italy	1:47.487	QS
7	Márcia Aldeias; Maria Cabrita	Portugal	1:47.575	QS

==== Heat 2 ====
Rank	Kayakers	Country	Time	Notes
1	Milica Starović; Dalma Ružičić-Benedek	Serbia	1:38.191	QF, GB
2	Roxana Borha; Elena Meroniac	Romania	1:38.519	QF
3	Marharyta Makhneva; Maryna Litvinchuk	Belarus	1:39.396	QF
4	Anna Kárász; Ninetta Vad	Hungary	1:39.893	QS
5	Lani Belcher; Angela Hannah	Great Britain	1:42.205	QS
6	Ivana Kmeťová; Martina Kohlová	Slovakia	1:44.421	QS
7	Elizabeth Bates; Inês Esteves	Turkey	1:47.593	QS

=== Semifinal ===
The fastest three boats advanced to the final.

Rank	Kayakers	Country	Time	Notes
1	Anna Kárász; Ninetta Vad	Hungary	1:39.021	QF
2	Ivana Kmeťová; Martina Kohlová	Slovakia	1:39.875	QF
3	Ana Varela; Isabel Contreras	Spain	1:40.002	QF
4	Lani Belcher; Angela Hannah	Great Britain	1:40.168	
5	Sofia Campana; Norma Murabito	Italy	1:43.297	
6	Anastasiya Horlova; Liudmyla Galushko	Ukraine	1:44.501	
7	Márcia Aldeias; Maria Cabrita	Portugal	1:45.437	
8	Elizabeth Bates; Inês Esteves	Turkey	1:46.903	

=== Final ===
Competitors in this final raced for positions 1 to 9, with medals going to the top three.

Rank	Kayakers	Country	Time
1st place, gold medalist(s)	Milica Starović; Dalma Ružičić-Benedek	Serbia	1:49.904
2nd place, silver medalist(s)	Roxana Borha; Elena Meroniac	Romania	1:50.925
3rd place, bronze medalist(s)	Anna Kárász; Ninetta Vad	Hungary	1:51.174
4	Franziska Weber; Tina Dietze	Germany	1:51.349
5	Marharyta Makhneva; Maryna Litvinchuk	Belarus	1:51.872
6	Karolina Naja; Beata Mikołajczyk	Poland	1:52.536
7	Ivana Kmeťová; Martina Kohlová	Slovakia	1:55.995
8	Ana Varela; Isabel Contreras	Spain	1:56.036
9	Elena Aniushina; Svetlana Chernigovskaya	Russia	1:56.411
