= 2018 ICF Canoe Sprint World Championships – Women's K-2 500 metres =

Women's K-2 500 metres at the 2018 ICF Canoe Sprint World Championships
- Venue: Centro de Alto Rendimento de Montemor-o-Velho
- Location: Montemor-o-Velho, Portugal
- Dates: 23–25 August
- Competitors: 34 from 17 nations
- Winning time: 1:43.065

Medalists
gold medal	Anna Kárász; Danuta Kozák	Hungary
silver medal	Lisa Carrington; Caitlin Ryan	New Zealand
bronze medal	Jasmin Fritz; Steffi Kriegerstein	Germany

The women's K-2 500 metres competition at the 2018 ICF Canoe Sprint World Championships in Montemor-o-Velho took place at the Centro de Alto Rendimento de Montemor-o-Velho.

== Schedule ==
The schedule was as follows:

Date	Time	Round
Thursday 23 August 2018	11:59	Heats
Saturday 25 August 2018	09:45	Semifinal
Saturday 25 August 2018	13:04	Final

All times are Western European Summer Time (UTC+1)

== Results ==
=== Heats ===
The fastest three boats in each heat advanced directly to the final. The next four fastest boats in each heat, plus the fastest remaining boat advanced to the semifinal.

==== Heat 1 ====
Rank	Kayakers	Country	Time	Notes
1	Lisa Carrington; Caitlin Ryan	New Zealand	1:39.262	QF
2	Anna Kárász; Danuta Kozák	Hungary	1:40.347	QF
3	Teresa Portela; Joana Vasconcelos	Portugal	1:41.737	QF
4	Justyna Iskrzycka; Paulina Paszek	Poland	1:42.017	QS
5	Ana Roxana Lehaci; Viktoria Schwarz	Austria	1:43.087	QS
6	Hermien Peters; Lize Broekx	Belgium	1:44.377	QS
7	Natalia García; Laia Pelachs	Spain	1:44.972	QS
8	Roxana Ciur; Elena Meroniac	Romania	1:46.802	
9	Deborah Kerr; Emily Lewis	Great Britain	1:47.282	

==== Heat 2 ====
Rank	Kayakers	Country	Time	Notes
1	Jasmin Fritz; Steffi Kriegerstein	Germany	1:41.448	QF
2	Mariya Povkh; Liudmyla Kuklinovska	Ukraine	1:41.758	QF
3	Manon Hostens; Sarah Guyot	France	1:42.018	QF
4	Milica Starović; Kristina Bedeč	Serbia	1:43.208	QS
5	Kira Stepanova; Svetlana Chernigovskaya	Russia	1:43.213	QS
6	Courtney Stott; Lisa Bissonnette	Canada	1:43.978	QS
7	Moa Wikberg; Melina Andersson	Sweden	1:46.128	QS
8	Marianna Petrušová; Martina Gogolová	Slovakia	1:46.703	qS

=== Semifinal ===
The fastest three boats advanced to the final.

Rank	Kayakers	Country	Time	Notes
1	Justyna Iskrzycka; Paulina Paszek	Poland	1:43.650	QF
2	Ana Roxana Lehaci; Viktoria Schwarz	Austria	1:44.155	QF
3	Milica Starović; Kristina Bedeč	Serbia	1:44.355	QF
4	Hermien Peters; Lize Broekx	Belgium	1:44.595	
5	Courtney Stott; Lisa Bissonnette	Canada	1:46.190	
6	Kira Stepanova; Svetlana Chernigovskaya	Russia	1:46.980	
7	Moa Wikberg; Melina Andersson	Sweden	1:49.235	
8	Marianna Petrušová; Martina Gogolová	Slovakia	1:49.310	
9	Natalia García; Laia Pelachs	Spain	1:49.530	

=== Final ===
Competitors raced for positions 1 to 9, with medals going to the top three.

Rank	Kayakers	Country	Time
1st place, gold medalist(s)	Anna Kárász; Danuta Kozák	Hungary	1:43.065
2nd place, silver medalist(s)	Lisa Carrington; Caitlin Ryan	New Zealand	1:43.088
3rd place, bronze medalist(s)	Jasmin Fritz; Steffi Kriegerstein	Germany	1:45.589
4	Manon Hostens; Sarah Guyot	France	1:45.682
5	Justyna Iskrzycka; Paulina Paszek	Poland	1:46.832
6	Mariya Povkh; Liudmyla Kuklinovska	Ukraine	1:47.902
7	Ana Roxana Lehaci; Viktoria Schwarz	Austria	1:48.272
8	Teresa Portela; Joana Vasconcelos	Portugal	1:49.665
9	Milica Starović; Kristina Bedeč	Serbia	1:49.919
