= Canoe sprint at the 2015 European Games – Women's K-2 200 metres =

Women's K-2 200 metres at the 2015 European Games
- Venue: Kur Sport and Rowing Centre, Mingachevir
- Date: 15–16 June
- Competitors: 26 from 13 nations
- Winning time: 37.399

Medalists
gold medal	Marharyta Makhneva; Maryna Litvinchuk	Belarus
silver medal	Nikolina Moldovan; Olivera Moldovan	Serbia
bronze medal	Mariya Povkh; Anastasiia Todorova	Ukraine

The women's K-2 200 metres canoe sprint competition at the 2015 European Games in Baku took place between 15 and 16 June at the Kur Sport and Rowing Centre in Mingachevir.

== Schedule ==
The schedule was as follows:

Date	Time	Round
Monday 15 June 2015	14:55	Heats
Monday 15 June 2015	16:40	Semifinals
Tuesday 16 June 2015	15:40	Finals

All times are Azerbaijan Summer Time (UTC+5)

== Results ==
=== Heats ===
The fastest three boats in each heat advanced directly to the final. The next four fastest boats in each heat, plus the fastest remaining boat advanced to the semifinal.

==== Heat 1 ====
Rank	Kayakers	Country	Time	Notes
1	Marharyta Makhneva; Maryna Litvinchuk	Belarus	37.154	QF, GB
2	Mariya Povkh; Anastasiia Todorova	Ukraine	37.439	QF
3	Anna Kárász; Ninetta Vad	Hungary	37.592	QF
4	Joana Vasconcelos; Beatriz Gomes	Portugal	37.797	QS
5	Ivana Kmeťová; Martina Kohlová	Slovakia	38.085	QS
6	Begoña Lazcano; Isabel Contreras	Spain	40.096	QS
7	Elizabeth Bates; Inês Esteves	Turkey	40.184	QS

==== Heat 2 ====
Rank	Kayakers	Country	Time	Notes
1	Nikolina Moldovan; Olivera Moldovan	Serbia	37.274	QF
2	Karolina Naja; Beata Mikołajczyk	Poland	37.696	QF
3	Sabine Volz; Conny Waßmuth	Germany	38.055	QF
4	Norma Murabito; Sofia Campana	Italy	39.174	QS
5	Vera Sobetova; Kira Stepanova	Russia	39.346	QS
–	Emily Lewis; Hayleigh Mason	Great Britain	DNF	

=== Semifinal ===
The fastest three boats advanced to the final.

Rank	Kayakers	Country	Time	Notes
1	Ivana Kmeťová; Martina Kohlová	Slovakia	36.847	QF, GB
2	Joana Vasconcelos; Beatriz Gomes	Portugal	37.264	QF
3	Norma Murabito; Sofia Campana	Italy	37.906	QF
4	Vera Sobetova; Kira Stepanova	Russia	38.300	
5	Elizabeth Bates; Inês Esteves	Turkey	38.347	
6	Begoña Lazcano; Isabel Contreras	Spain	38.704	

=== Final ===
Competitors in this final raced for positions 1 to 9, with medals going to the top three.

Rank	Kayakers	Country	Time
1st place, gold medalist(s)	Marharyta Makhneva; Maryna Litvinchuk	Belarus	37.399
2nd place, silver medalist(s)	Nikolina Moldovan; Olivera Moldovan	Serbia	37.699
3rd place, bronze medalist(s)	Mariya Povkh; Anastasiia Todorova	Ukraine	37.719
4	Anna Kárász; Ninetta Vad	Hungary	38.165
5	Karolina Naja; Beata Mikołajczyk	Poland	38.410
6	Joana Vasconcelos; Beatriz Gomes	Portugal	38.609
7	Sabine Volz; Conny Waßmuth	Germany	38.638
8	Norma Murabito; Sofia Campana	Italy	39.678
9	Ivana Kmeťová; Martina Kohlová	Slovakia	41.853
