= Canoe sprint at the 2019 European Games – Women's K-2 500 metres =

2019 European Games

Women's K-2 500 metres at the 2019 European Games
- Venue: Zaslavl Regatta Course
- Date: 25–26 June
- Competitors: 36 from 18 nations
- Winning time: 1:40.888

Medalists
gold medal	Maryna Litvinchuk; Volha Khudzenka	Belarus
silver medal	Anna Kárász; Danuta Kozák	Hungary
bronze medal	Kira Stepanova; Anastasia Panchenko	Russia

The women's K-2 500 metres canoe sprint competition at the 2019 European Games in Minsk took place between 25 and 26 June at the Zaslavl Regatta Course.

== Schedule ==
The schedule was as follows:

Date	Time	Round
Tuesday 25 June 2019	09:43	Heats
Tuesday 25 June 2019	15:59	Semifinal
Wednesday 26 June 2019	10:35	Final

All times are Further-eastern European Time (UTC+3)

== Results ==
=== Heats ===
The fastest three boats in each heat advanced directly to the final. The next four fastest boats in each heat, plus the fastest remaining boat advanced to the semifinal.

==== Heat 1 ====
Rank	Kayakers	Country	Time	Notes
1	Manon Hostens; Sarah Guyot	France	1:40.874	QF
2	Justyna Iskrzycka; Katarzyna Kołodziejczyk	Poland	1:41.174	QF
3	Kira Stepanova; Anastasia Panchenko	Russia	1:41.386	QF
4	Jasmin Fritz; Steffi Kriegerstein	Germany	1:41.446	QS
5	Moa Wikberg; Melina Andersson	Sweden	1:43.354	QS
6	Pauliina Polet; Netta Malinen	Finland	1:45.406	QS
7	Jessica Zatlkajová; Marianna Petrušová	Slovakia	1:45.549	QS
8	Francesca Capodimonte; Sofia Campana	Italy	1:47.244	qS
–	Aida Bauza; Carolina García	Spain	DSQ	

==== Heat 2 ====
Rank	Kayakers	Country	Time	Notes
1	Anna Kárász; Danuta Kozák	Hungary	1:37.813	QF, GB
2	Maryna Litvinchuk; Volha Khudzenka	Belarus	1:37.971	QF
3	Hermien Peters; Lize Broekx	Belgium	1:40.451	QF
4	Mariya Povkh; Liudmyla Kuklinovska	Ukraine	1:40.926	QS
5	Ana Roxana Lehaci; Viktoria Schwarz	Austria	1:43.431	QS
6	Roxana Ciur; Iuliana Ţăran	Romania	1:43.521	QS
7	Marija Dostanić; Kristina Bedeč	Serbia	1:44.353	QS
8	Barbora Dimovová; Zuzana Štemberková	Czech Republic	1:47.718	qS
9	Sara Sotero; Francisca Carvalho	Portugal	1:53.038	

=== Semifinal ===
The fastest three boats advanced to the final.

Rank	Kayakers	Country	Time	Notes
1	Jasmin Fritz; Steffi Kriegerstein	Germany	1:38.942	QF
2	Mariya Povkh; Liudmyla Kuklinovska	Ukraine	1:39.092	QF
3	Ana Roxana Lehaci; Viktoria Schwarz	Austria	1:40.065	QF
4	Moa Wikberg; Melina Andersson	Sweden	1:40.290	
5	Roxana Ciur; Iuliana Ţăran	Romania	1:41.087	
6	Marija Dostanić; Kristina Bedeč	Serbia	1:42.640	
7	Jessica Zatlkajová; Marianna Petrušová	Slovakia	1:43.535	
8	Pauliina Polet; Netta Malinen	Finland	1:43.617	
9	Francesca Capodimonte; Sofia Campana	Italy	1:44.777	
10	Barbora Dimovová; Zuzana Štemberková	Czech Republic	1:47.110	

=== Final ===
Competitors in this final raced for positions 1 to 9, with medals going to the top three.

Rank	Kayakers	Country	Time
1st place, gold medalist(s)	Maryna Litvinchuk; Volha Khudzenka	Belarus	1:40.888
2nd place, silver medalist(s)	Anna Kárász; Danuta Kozák	Hungary	1:42.526
3rd place, bronze medalist(s)	Kira Stepanova; Anastasia Panchenko	Russia	1:43.358
4	Jasmin Fritz; Steffi Kriegerstein	Germany	1:43.951
5	Justyna Iskrzycka; Katarzyna Kołodziejczyk	Poland	1:44.541
6	Mariya Povkh; Liudmyla Kuklinovska	Ukraine	1:44.698
7	Hermien Peters; Lize Broekx	Belgium	1:44.826
8	Ana Roxana Lehaci; Viktoria Schwarz	Austria	1:44.848
9	Manon Hostens; Sarah Guyot	France	1:48.376
