= Canoe sprint at the 2019 European Games – Women's K-2 200 metres =

Women's K-2 200 metres at the 2019 European Games
- Venue: Zaslavl Regatta Course
- Date: 26–27 June
- Competitors: 30 from 15 nations
- Winning time: 44.781

Medalists
gold medal	Mariya Povkh; Liudmyla Kuklinovska	Ukraine
silver medal	Franziska John; Tina Dietze	Germany
bronze medal	Volha Khudzenka; Maryna Litvinchuk	Belarus

The women's K-2 200 metres canoe sprint competition at the 2019 European Games in Minsk took place between 26 and 27 June at the Zaslavl Regatta Course.

== Schedule ==
The schedule was as follows:

Date	Time	Round
Wednesday 26 June 2019	14:55	Heats
Wednesday 26 June 2019	16:35	Semifinal
Thursday 27 June 2019	14:45	Final

All times are Further-eastern European Time (UTC+3)

== Results ==
=== Heats ===
The fastest three boats in each heat advanced directly to the final. The next four fastest boats in each heat, plus the fastest remaining boat advanced to the semifinal.

==== Heat 1 ====
Rank	Kayakers	Country	Time	Notes
1	Franziska John; Tina Dietze	Germany	37.761	QF
2	Anna Lucz; Blanka Kiss	Hungary	37.956	QF
3	Mariya Povkh; Liudmyla Kuklinovska	Ukraine	38.076	QF
4	Manon Hostens; Sarah Guyot	France	38.144	QS
5	Teresa Portela; Joana Vasconcelos	Portugal	38.324	QS
6	Moa Wikberg; Melina Andersson	Sweden	38.489	QS
7	Susanna Cicali; Francesca Genzo	Italy	38.819	QS
8	Kateřina Zárubová; Barbora Dimovová	Czech Republic	42.161	qS

==== Heat 2 ====
Rank	Kayakers	Country	Time	Notes
1	Volha Khudzenka; Maryna Litvinchuk	Belarus	37.883	QF
2	Karolina Naja; Helena Wiśniewska	Poland	38.965	QF
3	Anastasia Panchenko; Kira Stepanova	Russia	39.368	QF
4	Ana Roxana Lehaci; Viktoria Schwarz	Austria	39.730	QS
5	Line Langelund; Bolette Iversen	Denmark	40.428	QS
6	Alicia Heredia; Carolina García	Spain	41.533	QS
7	Roxana Ciur; Laura Pleşca	Romania	42.715	QS

=== Semifinal ===
The fastest three boats advanced to the final.

Rank	Kayakers	Country	Time	Notes
1	Manon Hostens; Sarah Guyot	France	37.636	QF
2	Teresa Portela; Joana Vasconcelos	Portugal	37.771	QF
3	Ana Roxana Lehaci; Viktoria Schwarz	Austria	38.101	QF
4	Moa Wikberg; Melina Andersson	Sweden	38.191	
5	Susanna Cicali; Francesca Genzo	Italy	38.386	
6	Line Langelund; Bolette Iversen	Denmark	39.321	
7	Alicia Heredia; Carolina García	Spain	39.621	
8	Roxana Ciur; Laura Pleşca	Romania	40.279	
9	Kateřina Zárubová; Barbora Dimovová	Czech Republic	40.844	

=== Final ===
Competitors in this final raced for positions 1 to 9, with medals going to the top three.

Rank	Kayakers	Country	Time
1st place, gold medalist(s)	Mariya Povkh; Liudmyla Kuklinovska	Ukraine	44.781
2nd place, silver medalist(s)	Franziska John; Tina Dietze	Germany	44.961
3rd place, bronze medalist(s)	Volha Khudzenka; Maryna Litvinchuk	Belarus	45.073
4	Karolina Naja; Helena Wiśniewska	Poland	45.771
5	Ana Roxana Lehaci; Viktoria Schwarz	Austria	45.913
6	Teresa Portela; Joana Vasconcelos	Portugal	46.243
7	Anastasia Panchenko; Kira Stepanova	Russia	46.296
8	Manon Hostens; Sarah Guyot	France	47.096
9	Anna Lucz; Blanka Kiss	Hungary	47.351
