= 2021 ICF Canoe Sprint World Championships – Women's K-2 200 metres =

Women's K-2 200 metres at the 2021 ICF Canoe Sprint World Championships
- Venue: Lake Bagsværd
- Location: Copenhagen, Denmark
- Dates: 16–18 September
- Competitors: 36 from 18 nations
- Winning time: 37.41

Medalists
gold medal	Kristina Kovnir; Anastasiia Dolgova	International Olympic Committee
silver medal	Blanka Kiss; Anna Lucz	Hungary
bronze medal	Dominika Putto; Katarzyna Kołodziejczyk	Poland

The women's K-2 200 metres competition at the 2021 ICF Canoe Sprint World Championships in Copenhagen took place on Lake Bagsværd.

== Schedule ==
The schedule was as follows:

Date	Time	Round
Thursday 16 September 2021	09:45	Heats
Thursday 16 September 2021	16:25	Semifinal
Saturday 18 September 2021	11:03	Final

All times are Central European Summer Time (UTC+2)

== Results ==
=== Heats ===
The fastest three boats in each heat advanced directly to the final.
The next four fastest boats in each heat, plus the fastest remaining boat advanced to the semifinal.

==== Heat 1 ====
Rank	Kayakers	Country	Time	Notes
1	Kristina Kovnir; Anastasiia Dolgova	RCF	37.99	QF
2	Dominika Putto; Katarzyna Kołodziejczyk	Poland	38.11	QF
3	Blanka Kiss; Anna Lucz	Hungary	38.29	QF
4	Irene Bellan; Francesca Genzo	Italy	38.95	QS
5	Teresa Tirado; Mirella Vázquez	Spain	39.50	QS
6	Maria Rei; Francisca Laia	Portugal	39.74	QS
7	Courtney Stott; Alanna Bray-Lougheed	Canada	41.04	QS
8	Victoria Chiew; Soh Sze Ying	Singapore	42.10	
–	Špela Ponomarenko Janić; Anja Osterman	Slovenia	DNS	

==== Heat 2 ====
Rank	Kayakers	Country	Time	Notes
1	Volha Khudzenka; Maryna Litvinchuk	Belarus	38.17	QF
2	Mariya Povkh; Anastasiya Horlova	Ukraine	38.98	QF
3	Ana Roxana Lehaci; Viktoria Schwarz	Austria	39.33	QF
4	Štěpánka Sobíšková; Barbora Galádová	Czech Republic	39.51	QS
5	Julie Funch; Bolette Nyvang Iversen	Denmark	39.59	QS
6	Hermien Peters; Lize Broekx	Belgium	39.74	QS
7	Karina Alanís; Maricela Montemayor	Mexico	39.97	QS
8	Melina Andersson; Julia Lagerstam	Sweden	40.61	qS
9	Zoe Clark; Enya Dale	Great Britain	41.14	

=== Semifinal ===
The fastest three boats advanced to the final.

Rank	Kayakers	Country	Time	Notes
1	Irene Bellan; Francesca Genzo	Italy	39.15	QF
2	Štěpánka Sobíšková; Barbora Galádová	Czech Republic	39.53	QF
3	Maria Rei; Francisca Laia	Portugal	39.54	QF
4	Julie Funch; Bolette Nyvang Iversen	Denmark	39.55	
5	Melina Andersson; Julia Lagerstam	Sweden	39.79	
6	Teresa Tirado; Mirella Vázquez	Spain	39.82	
7	Hermien Peters; Lize Broekx	Belgium	40.06	
8	Karina Alanís; Maricela Montemayor	Mexico	40.13	
9	Courtney Stott; Alanna Bray-Lougheed	Canada	41.31	

=== Final ===
Competitors raced for positions 1 to 9, with medals going to the top three.

Rank	Kayakers	Country	Time
1st place, gold medalist(s)	Kristina Kovnir; Anastasiia Dolgova	RCF	37.41
2nd place, silver medalist(s)	Blanka Kiss; Anna Lucz	Hungary	37.65
3rd place, bronze medalist(s)	Dominika Putto; Katarzyna Kołodziejczyk	Poland	37.67
4	Volha Khudzenka; Maryna Litvinchuk	Belarus	38.05
4	Irene Bellan; Francesca Genzo	Italy	38.05
6	Mariya Povkh; Anastasiya Horlova	Ukraine	38.76
7	Ana Roxana Lehaci; Viktoria Schwarz	Austria	38.78
8	Štěpánka Sobíšková; Barbora Galádová	Czech Republic	38.99
9	Maria Rei; Francisca Laia	Portugal	39.26
