= Canoe sprint at the 2019 European Games – Women's K-4 500 metres =

Women's K-4 500 metres at the 2019 European Games
- Venue: Zaslavl Regatta Course
- Date: 25–27 June
- Competitors: 48 from 12 nations
- Winning time: 1:41.526

Medalists
gold medal	Anna Kárász; Danuta Kozák; Tamara Csipes; Erika Medveczky	Hungary
silver medal	Marharyta Makhneva; Nadzeya Papok; Volha Khudzenka; Maryna Litvinchuk	Belarus
bronze medal	Karolina Naja; Katarzyna Kołodziejczyk; Anna Puławska; Helena Wiśniewska	Poland

The women's K-4 500 metres canoe sprint competition at the 2019 European Games in Minsk took place between 25 and 27 June at the Zaslavl Regatta Course.

== Schedule ==
The schedule was as follows:

Date	Time	Round
Tuesday 25 June 2019	14:50	Heats
Tuesday 25 June 2019	17:30	Semifinal
Thursday 27 June 2019	11:05	Final

All times are Further-eastern European Time (UTC+3)

== Results ==
=== Heats ===
The fastest three boats in each heat advanced directly to the final. The next four fastest boats in each heat, plus the fastest remaining boat advanced to the semifinal.

==== Heat 1 ====
Rank	Kayakers	Country	Time	Notes
1	Anna Kárász; Danuta Kozák; Tamara Csipes; Erika Medveczky	Hungary	1:30.359	QF, GB
2	Karolina Naja; Katarzyna Kołodziejczyk; Anna Puławska; Helena Wiśniewska	Poland	1:30.704	QF
3	Manon Hostens; Sarah Troël; Sarah Guyot; Léa Jamelot	France	1:31.764	QF
4	Mariia Kichasova-Skoryk; Nataliia Dokiienko; Anastasiia Todorova; Anastasiya Horlova	Ukraine	1:32.146	QS
5	Emma Jørgensen; Line Langelund; Julie Funch; Pernille Knudsen	Denmark	1:33.446	QS
6	Eliška Betlachová; Anežka Paloudova; Kateřina Zárubová; Barbora Betlachová	Czech Republic	1:36.771	QS

==== Heat 2 ====
Rank	Kayakers	Country	Time	Notes
1	Marharyta Makhneva; Nadzeya Papok; Volha Khudzenka; Maryna Litvinchuk	Belarus	1:29.752	QF, GB
2	Sabrina Hering-Pradler; Franziska John; Caroline Arft; Tina Dietze	Germany	1:30.859	QF
3	Kristina Kovnir; Vera Sobetova; Kira Stepanova; Anastasia Panchenko	Russia	1:31.339	QF
4	Joana Vasconcelos; Teresa Portela; Francisca Laia; Francisca Carvalho	Portugal	1:32.739	QS
5	Sara Ouzande; Natalia García; Isabel Contreras; Begoña Lazcano	Spain	1:32.979	QS
6	Susanna Cicali; Francesca Capodimonte; Francesca Genzo; Sofia Campana	Italy	1:47.864	QS

=== Semifinal ===
The fastest three boats advanced to the final.

Rank	Kayakers	Country	Time	Notes
1	Emma Jørgensen; Line Langelund; Julie Funch; Pernille Knudsen	Denmark	1:33.700	QF
2	Sara Ouzande; Natalia García; Isabel Contreras; Begoña Lazcano	Spain	1:34.030	QF
3	Joana Vasconcelos; Teresa Portela; Francisca Laia; Francisca Carvalho	Portugal	1:34.067	QF
4	Mariia Kichasova-Skoryk; Nataliia Dokiienko; Anastasiia Todorova; Anastasiya Horlova	Ukraine	1:34.367	
5	Eliška Betlachová; Anežka Paloudova; Kateřina Zárubová; Barbora Betlachová	Czech Republic	1:37.572	
6	Susanna Cicali; Francesca Capodimonte; Francesca Genzo; Sofia Campana	Italy	1:39.022	

=== Final ===
Competitors in this final raced for positions 1 to 9, with medals going to the top three.

Rank	Kayakers	Country	Time
1st place, gold medalist(s)	Anna Kárász; Danuta Kozák; Tamara Csipes; Erika Medveczky	Hungary	1:41.526
2nd place, silver medalist(s)	Marharyta Makhneva; Nadzeya Papok; Volha Khudzenka; Maryna Litvinchuk	Belarus	1:41.654
3rd place, bronze medalist(s)	Karolina Naja; Katarzyna Kołodziejczyk; Anna Puławska; Helena Wiśniewska	Poland	1:42.851
4	Sabrina Hering-Pradler; Franziska John; Caroline Arft; Tina Dietze	Germany	1:43.294
5	Manon Hostens; Sarah Troël; Sarah Guyot; Léa Jamelot	France	1:44.479
6	Kristina Kovnir; Vera Sobetova; Kira Stepanova; Anastasia Panchenko	Russia	1:44.756
7	Emma Jørgensen; Line Langelund; Julie Funch; Pernille Knudsen	Denmark	1:45.346
8	Joana Vasconcelos; Teresa Portela; Francisca Laia; Francisca Carvalho	Portugal	1:48.236
9	Sara Ouzande; Natalia García; Isabel Contreras; Begoña Lazcano	Spain	1:49.624
