= 2021 ICF Canoe Sprint World Championships – Women's K-4 500 metres =

Women's K-4 500 metres at the 2021 ICF Canoe Sprint World Championships
- Venue: Lake Bagsværd
- Location: Copenhagen, Denmark
- Dates: 17–19 September
- Competitors: 64 from 16 nations
- Winning time: 1:32.55

Medalists
gold medal	Marharyta Makhneva; Nadzeya Liapeshka; Volha Khudzenka; Maryna Litvinchuk	Belarus
silver medal	Danuta Kozák; Tamara Csipes; Anna Kárász; Alida Dóra Gazsó	Hungary
bronze medal	Svetlana Chernigovskaya; Elena Aniushina; Kira Stepanova; Anastasia Panchenko	International Olympic Committee

The women's K-4 500 metres competition at the 2021 ICF Canoe Sprint World Championships in Copenhagen took place on Lake Bagsværd.

== Schedule ==
The schedule was as follows:

Date	Time	Round
Friday 17 September 2021	11:44	Heats
Saturday 18 September 2021	14:24	Semifinal
Sunday 19 September 2021	12:39	Final

All times are Central European Summer Time (UTC+2)

== Results ==
=== Heats ===
The fastest three boats in each heat advanced directly to the final.
The next four fastest boats in each heat, plus the fastest remaining boat advanced to the semifinal.

==== Heat 1 ====
Rank	Kayakers	Country	Time	Notes
1	Danuta Kozák; Tamara Csipes; Anna Kárász; Alida Dóra Gazsó	Hungary	1:34.75	QF
2	Marharyta Makhneva; Nadzeya Liapeshka; Volha Khudzenka; Maryna Litvinchuk	Belarus	1:35.31	QF
3	Diana Tanko; Anastasiya Horlova; Yuliia Yuriichuk; Inna Hryshchun	Ukraine	1:37.07	QF
4	Claire Bren; Vanina Paoletti; Manon Hostens; Léa Jamelot	France	1:39.79	QS
5	Zoe Clark; Anoushka Freeman; Florence Duffield; Enya Dale	Great Britain	1:43.14	QS
6	Sara Ouzande; Carolina García; Laia Pelachs; Begoña Lazkano	Spain	1:43.24	QS
7	Esti Olivier; Bridgitte Hartley; Zara Wood; Michelle Burn	South Africa	1:45.59	QS
8	Soh Sze Ying; Victoria Chiew; Jia Saq; Wern Chan	Singapore	1:49.36	qS
–	Yang Jiali; Lin Huiqun; Luo Lu; Peng Yanjun	China	DNS	

==== Heat 2 ====
Rank	Kayakers	Country	Time	Notes
1	Dominika Putto; Julia Olszewska; Klaudia Cyrulewska; Katarzyna Kołodziejczyk	Poland	1:36.32	QF
2	Svetlana Chernigovskaya; Elena Aniushina; Kira Stepanova; Anastasia Panchenko	RCF	1:36.66	QF
3	Pernille Knudsen; Julie Funch; Sara Milthers; Bolette Nyvang Iversen	Denmark	1:38.88	QF
4	Kateřina Zárubová; Eliška Betlachová; Barbora Betlachová; Adela Házová	Czech Republic	1:39.24	QS
5	Maria Virik; Kristine Amundsen; Anna Sletsjøe; Elise Erland	Norway	1:40.24	QS
6	Melina Andersson; Alexandra Torudd; Julia Lagerstam; Rebecka Georgsdotter	Sweden	1:41.33	QS
7	Courtney Stott; Michelle Russell; Alanna Bray-Lougheed; Madeline Schmidt	Canada	1:42.02	QS

=== Semifinal ===
The fastest three boats advanced to the final.

Rank	Kayakers	Country	Time	Notes
1	Claire Bren; Vanina Paoletti; Manon Hostens; Léa Jamelot	France	1:35.90	QF
2	Maria Virik; Kristine Amundsen; Anna Sletsjøe; Elise Erland	Norway	1:36.60	QF
3	Kateřina Zárubová; Eliška Betlachová; Barbora Betlachová; Adela Házová	Czech Republic	1:37.83	QF
4	Courtney Stott; Michelle Russell; Alanna Bray-Lougheed; Madeline Schmidt	Canada	1:37.85	
5	Melina Andersson; Alexandra Torudd; Julia Lagerstam; Rebecka Georgsdotter	Sweden	1:38.02	
6	Sara Ouzande; Carolina García; Laia Pelachs; Begoña Lazkano	Spain	1:39.22	
7	Zoe Clark; Anoushka Freeman; Florence Duffield; Enya Dale	Great Britain	1:40.62	
8	Esti Olivier; Bridgitte Hartley; Zara Wood; Michelle Burn	South Africa	1:42.87	
9	Soh Sze Ying; Victoria Chiew; Jia Saq; Wern Chan	Singapore	1:46.48	

=== Final ===
Competitors raced for positions 1 to 9, with medals going to the top three.

Rank	Kayakers	Country	Time
1st place, gold medalist(s)	Marharyta Makhneva; Nadzeya Liapeshka; Volha Khudzenka; Maryna Litvinchuk	Belarus	1:32.55
2nd place, silver medalist(s)	Danuta Kozák; Tamara Csipes; Anna Kárász; Alida Dóra Gazsó	Hungary	1:32.71
3rd place, bronze medalist(s)	Svetlana Chernigovskaya; Elena Aniushina; Kira Stepanova; Anastasia Panchenko	RCF	1:35.30
4	Dominika Putto; Julia Olszewska; Klaudia Cyrulewska; Katarzyna Kołodziejczyk	Poland	1:35.92
5	Diana Tanko; Anastasiya Horlova; Yuliia Yuriichuk; Inna Hryshchun	Ukraine	1:36.16
6	Claire Bren; Vanina Paoletti; Manon Hostens; Léa Jamelot	France	1:36.61
7	Pernille Knudsen; Julie Funch; Sara Milthers; Bolette Nyvang Iversen	Denmark	1:38.56
8	Kateřina Zárubová; Eliška Betlachová; Barbora Betlachová; Adela Házová	Czech Republic	1:39.06
9	Maria Virik; Kristine Amundsen; Anna Sletsjøe; Elise Erland	Norway	1:39.32
