= 2024 ICF Canoe Sprint World Championships – Women's K-2 200 metres =

Women's K-2 200 metres at the 2024 ICF Canoe Sprint World Championships
- Venue: Rowing and Canoeing Race Course in Samarkand
- Location: Samarkand, Uzbekistan
- Dates: 23–24 August
- Competitors: 28 from 14 nations
- Winning time: 37.326

Medalists
gold medal	Svetlana Chernigovskaya; Anastasiia Dolgova	Authorised Neutral Athletes
silver medal	Volha Khudzenka; Maryna Litvinchuk	Authorised Neutral Athletes
bronze medal	Réka Kiskó; Angelina Szegedi	Hungary

The women's K-2 200 metres competition at the 2024 ICF Canoe Sprint World Championships in Samarkand took place in Rowing and Canoeing Race Course in Samarkand.

== Schedule ==
The schedule is as follows:

Date	Time	Round
Friday 23 August 2024	16:06	Heats
Friday 23 August 2024	17:52	Semifinals
Saturday 24 August 2024	12:25	Final

== Results ==
=== Heats ===
The fastest three boats in each heat advanced directly to the final.
The next four fastest boats in each heat, plus the fastest remaining boat advanced to the semifinal

==== Heat 1 ====
Rank	Canoeist	Country	Time	Notes
DSQ	Teresa Portela; Francisca Laia	Portugal	38.279	QF
2	Svetlana Chernigovskaya; Anastasiia Dolgova	Individual Neutral Athletes	38.545	QF
3	Teresa Tirado; Marta Figueroa	Spain	39.676	QF
4	Réka Bugár; Bianka Sidová	Slovakia	40.081	QS
5	Ekaterina Shubina; Arina Tanatmisheva	Uzbekistan	40.917	QS
6	Katarzyna Kołodziejczyk; Sandra Ostrowska	Poland	41.810	QS
7	Juri Urada; Honami Tohda	Japan	42.931	QS

==== Heat 2 ====
Rank	Canoeist	Country	Time	Notes
1	Volha Khudzenka; Maryna Litvinchuk	Individual Neutral Athletes	38.191	QF
2	Mia Medved; Anja Osterman	Slovenia	38.626	QF
3	Ivanna Dyachenko; Inna Klinova	Ukraine	38.876	QF
4	Réka Kiskó; Angelina Szegedi	Hungary	39.348	QS
5	Katrine Jensen; Sara Milthers	Denmark	39.684	QS
6	Olga Shmelyova; Tatyana Tokarnitskaya	Kazakhstan	40.728	QS
7	Choi Ran; Lee Han-sol	South Korea	43.272	QS

=== Semifinal ===
The fastest three boats advanced to the A final.

Rank	Canoeist	Country	Time	Notes
1	Katrine Jensen; Sara Milthers	Denmark	40.062	QF
2	Olga Shmelyova; Tatyana Tokarnitskaya	Kazakhstan	40.213	QF
3	Réka Kiskó; Angelina Szegedi	Hungary	40.352	QF
4	Réka Bugár; Bianka Sidová	Slovakia	40.630	
5	Ekaterina Shubina; Arina Tanatmisheva	Uzbekistan	41.121	
6	Katarzyna Kołodziejczyk; Sandra Ostrowska	Poland	41.526	
7	Juri Urada; Honami Tohda	Japan	41.674	
8	Choi Ran; Lee Han-sol	South Korea	44.143	

=== Final ===
Competitors raced for positions 1 to 9, with medals going to the top three.

Rank	Canoeist	Country	Time
1st place, gold medalist(s)	Svetlana Chernigovskaya; Anastasiia Dolgova	Individual Neutral Athletes	37.326
2nd place, silver medalist(s)	Volha Khudzenka; Maryna Litvinchuk	Individual Neutral Athletes	37.667
3rd place, bronze medalist(s)	Réka Kiskó; Angelina Szegedi	Hungary	38.668
4	Teresa Tirado; Marta Figueroa	Spain	38.877
5	Katrine Jensen; Sara Milthers	Denmark	38.918
6	Mia Medved; Anja Osterman	Slovenia	39.114
7	Ivanna Dyachenko; Inna Klinova	Ukraine	39.371
8	Olga Shmelyova; Tatyana Tokarnitskaya	Kazakhstan	39.880
	Teresa Portela; Francisca Laia	Portugal	DSQ
