= 2018 ICF Canoe Sprint World Championships – Women's K-1 5000 metres =

Women's K-1 5000 metres at the 2018 ICF Canoe Sprint World Championships
- Venue: Centro de Alto Rendimento de Montemor-o-Velho
- Location: Montemor-o-Velho, Portugal
- Dates: 26 August
- Competitors: 26 from 26 nations
- Winning time: 24:01.737

Medalists
gold medal	Lizzie Broughton	Great Britain
silver medal	Maryna Litvinchuk	Belarus
bronze medal	Jennifer Egan	Ireland

The women's K-1 5000 metres competition at the 2018 ICF Canoe Sprint World Championships in Montemor-o-Velho took place at the Centro de Alto Rendimento de Montemor-o-Velho.

== Schedule ==
The schedule was as follows:

Date	Time	Round
Sunday 26 August 2018	16:15	Final

All times are Western European Summer Time (UTC+1)

== Results ==
As a long-distance event, it was held as a direct final.

Rank	Kayaker	Country	Time
1st place, gold medalist(s)	Lizzie Broughton	Great Britain	24:01.737
2nd place, silver medalist(s)	Maryna Litvinchuk	Belarus	24:12.014
3rd place, bronze medalist(s)	Jennifer Egan	Ireland	24:15.075
4	Tamara Takács	Hungary	24:27.214
5	Emma Jørgensen	Denmark	24:36.180
6	Kristina Bedeč	Serbia	24:37.829
7	Bridgitte Hartley	South Africa	24:42.207
8	Eva Barrios	Spain	24:43.403
9	Sarah Brüßler	Germany	25:02.221
10	Ana Paula Vergutz	Brazil	25:02.549
11	Sarah Troël	France	25:11.296
12	Edyta Dzieniszewska-Kierkla	Poland	25:11.957
13	Michelle Russell	Canada	25:20.155
14	Catherine McArthur	Australia	25:25.626
15	Anna Kožíšková	Czech Republic	25:31.093
16	Netta Malinen	Finland	25:51.326
17	Márcia Aldeias	Portugal	26:24.572
18	Franziska Widmer	Switzerland	26:24.747
19	Laura Skukauska	Latvia	26:35.952
–	Linnea Stensils	Sweden	DNF
–	Anastasia Panchenko	Russia	DNF
–	Ana Roxana Lehaci	Austria	DNF
–	Mariana Petrušová	Slovakia	DSQ
–	Lize Broekx	Belgium	DSQ
–	Agata Fantini	Italy	DSQ
–	Caitlin Ryan	New Zealand	DSQ
