= Canoe sprint at the 2015 European Games – Women's K-1 5000 metres =

Women's K-1 5000 metres at the 2015 European Games
- Venue: Kur Sport and Rowing Centre, Mingachevir
- Date: 16 June
- Competitors: 24 from 24 nations
- Winning time: 22:48.990

Medalists
gold medal	Maryna Litvinchuk	Belarus
silver medal	Lani Belcher	Great Britain
bronze medal	Renáta Csay	Hungary

The women's K-1 5000 metres canoe sprint competition at the 2015 European Games in Baku took place on 16 June at the Kur Sport and Rowing Centre in Mingachevir.

== Schedule ==
The schedule was as follows:

Date	Time	Round
Tuesday 16 June 2015	16:30	Final

All times are Azerbaijan Summer Time (UTC+5)

== Results ==
As a long-distance event, it was held as a direct final.

Rank	Kayaker	Country	Time
1st place, gold medalist(s)	Maryna Litvinchuk	Belarus	22:48.990 GB
2nd place, silver medalist(s)	Lani Belcher	Great Britain	23:05.625
3rd place, bronze medalist(s)	Renáta Csay	Hungary	23:05.851
4	Jennifer Egan	Ireland	23:06.306
5	Yuliana Salakhova	Russia	23:29.940
6	Lize Broekx	Belgium	23:30.600
7	Ana Varela	Spain	23:43.143
8	Eef Haaze	Netherlands	23:53.064
9	Edyta Dzieniszewska-Kierkla	Poland	23:57.911
10	Florentina Caminescu	Romania	24:05.669
11	Anna Kožíšková	Czech Republic	24:10.193
12	Yvonne Schuring	Austria	24:17.057
13	Berenike Faldum	Bulgaria	24:18.617
14	Lucia Mištinová	Slovakia	24:22.429
15	Svitlana Rymkevych	Ukraine	25:09.469
16	Inês Esteves	Turkey	25:10.326
17	Brigita Bakić	Croatia	25:40.741
–	Inna Osypenko-Radomska	Azerbaijan	DNF
–	Oona Vasko	Finland	DNF
–	Melanie Gebhardt	Germany	DNF
–	Irene Burgo	Italy	DNF
–	Vlada Kosytska	Georgia	DSQ
–	Natalia Gulco	Moldova	DSQ
–	Nikolina Moldovan	Serbia	DNS
