= Canoe sprint at the 2019 European Games – Women's K-1 5000 metres =

Sporting event at European Games

Women's K-1 5000 metres at the 2019 European Games
- Venue: Zaslavl Regatta Course
- Date: 27 June
- Competitors: 19 from 19 nations
- Winning time: 24:52.258

Medalists
gold medal	Maryna Litvinchuk	Belarus
silver medal	Dóra Bodonyi	Hungary
bronze medal	Marianna Petrušová	Slovakia

The women's K-1 5000 metres canoe sprint competition at the 2019 European Games in Minsk took place on 27 June at the Zaslavl Regatta Course.

== Schedule ==
The schedule was as follows:

Date	Time	Round
Thursday 27 June 2019	16:00	Final

All times are Further-eastern European Time (UTC+3)

== Results ==
As a long-distance event, it was held as a direct final.

Rank	Kayaker	Country	Time
1st place, gold medalist(s)	Maryna Litvinchuk	Belarus	24:52.258
2nd place, silver medalist(s)	Dóra Bodonyi	Hungary	24:53.003
3rd place, bronze medalist(s)	Marianna Petrušová	Slovakia	24:59.099
4	Jennifer Egan	Ireland	25:27.936
5	Kristina Bedeč	Serbia	25:48.266
6	Emma Jørgensen	Denmark	25:50.634
7	Lize Broekx	Belgium	26:06.078
8	Kira Stepanova	Russia	26:06.856
9	Eva Barrios	Spain	26:07.516
10	Jasmin Fritz	Germany	26:08.844
11	Małgorzata Puławska	Poland	26:09.362
12	Julia Lagerstam	Sweden	26:15.432
13	Anna Kožíšková	Czech Republic	26:18.603
14	Maria Virik	Norway	26:28.496
15	Inna Hryshchun	Ukraine	26:33.579
16	Sara Sotero	Portugal	26:46.322
17	Sarah Troël	France	27:22.973
18	Susanna Cicali	Italy	27:47.663
19	Netta Malinen	Finland	32:09.572
