= Olivera Moldovan =

Serbian canoeist (born 1989)

Personal information
- Born: 1 March 1989 (age 37) Belgrade, SR Serbia, Yugoslavia
Medal record
Women's canoe sprint
Representing Serbia
World Championships
Silver medal – second place	2014 Moscow	K-2 500 m
Bronze medal – third place	2013 Duisburg	K-2 200 m
European Championships
Bronze medal – third place	2014 Brandenburg	K-2 500 m
Bronze medal – third place	2015 Račice	K-2 200 m
European Games
Silver medal – second place	2015 Baku	K-2 200m
European U23 Championships
Gold medal – first place	2009 Poznań	K-2 500 m
Gold medal – first place	2010 Moscow	K-2 500 m
Silver medal – second place	2010 Moscow	K-2 200 m
Universiade
Silver medal – second place	2013 Kazan	K-2 200 m
Bronze medal – third place	2013 Kazan	K-2 500 m

Olivera Moldovan (Serbian Cyrillic: Оливера Молдован, born 1 March 1989) is a Serbian sprint canoer.

== Career ==
Olivera was born on 1 March 1989 in Belgrade, SR Serbia, Yugoslavia to a Serb father, Zoran Moldovan and a Russian mother, Tatjana, originally from Sochi, Russian SFSR, Soviet Union.

Her sister Nikolina Moldovan is also a sprint canoer.

Olivera represented Serbia with her sister at the 2012 Summer Olympics in the K-2 500m discipline.

Awards
Preceded by Tatjana Jelača	The Best Young Athlete of Serbia; 2010 (with Nikolina Moldovan)	Succeeded by Amela Terzić and Uroš Kovačević
