= Hungary at the 2015 European Games =

- IOC code: HUN
- NOC: Hungarian Olympic Committee
- Website: www.olimpia.hu

in Baku, Azerbaijan 12 – 28 June 2015
- Competitors: 200 in 22 sports
- Flag bearer: István Veréb
- Medals Ranked 12th: Gold 7 Silver 4 Bronze 8 Total 19

European Games appearances (overview)
- 2015; 2019; 2023; 2027

Hungary competed at the 2015 European Games, in Baku, Azerbaijan from 12 to 28 June 2015.

== Medalists ==
Medal	Name	Sport	Event	Date
Gold	Marianna Sastin	Wrestling	Women's freestyle 60 kg	15 June
Gold	Zoltán Kammerer; Tamás Szalai	Canoe sprint	Men's K2-1000m	15 June
Gold	Anna Kárász; Danuta Kozák; Gabriella Szabó; Ninetta Vad	Canoe sprint	Women's K4-500m	15 June
Gold	Emese Barka	Wrestling	Women's freestyle 58 kg	16 June
Gold	Zoltán Kammerer; Tamás Kulifai; Dávid Tóth; Dániel Pauman	Canoe sprint	Men's K4-1000m	16 June
Gold	Danuta Kozák	Canoe sprint	Women's K1-500m	16 June
Gold	Panna Szollosi; Dora Lendvay; Dora Hegyi; Balázs Farkas; Daniel Bali	Gymnastics	Aerobic Mixed groups	21 June
Silver	Bálint Korpási	Wrestling	Men's Greco-Roman 71 kg	13 June
Silver	Richárd Bognár	Shooting	Men's double trapg	19 June
Silver	Janka Juhász	Swimming	Women's 1500 metre freestyle	25 June
Silver	Hedvig Karakas	Judo	Women's 57 kg	25 June
Bronze	Attila Vajda	Canoe sprint	Men's C1-1000m	15 June
Bronze	Sándor Tótka; Peter Molnar	Canoe sprint	Men's K2-200m	16 June
Bronze	Danuta Kozák	Canoe sprint	Women's K1-200m	16 June
Bronze	Renáta Csay	Canoe sprint	Women's K1-5000m	16 June
Bronze	Anna Kárász; Ninetta Vad	Canoe sprint	Women's K2-500m	16 June
Bronze	Boglarka Bonecz	Swimming	Women's 200 metre butterfly	24 June
Bronze	Éva Csernoviczki	Judo	Women's 48 kg	25 June
Bronze	Zoltán Harcsa	Boxing	Men's 75 kg	27 June

== Gymnastics ==
=== Aerobic ===
Hungary has a total of six athletes after the performance at the 2013 Aerobic Gymnastics European Championships. One gymnast from pairs must compete in the group, making the total athletes to 6.

- Pairs – 1 pair of 2 athletes
- Groups – 1 team of 5 athletes

=== Artistic ===
- Women's – 3 quota places

=== Rhythmic ===
Hungary has qualified one athlete after the performance at the 2013 Rhythmic Gymnastics European Championships.

- Individual – 1 quota place

== Triathlon ==
- Men's – Gábor Faldum, Laszlo Tarnai, Bence Bicsak
- Women's – Zsanett Horváth, Dora Mester
