= Dóra Bodonyi =

Hungarian canoeist (born 1993)

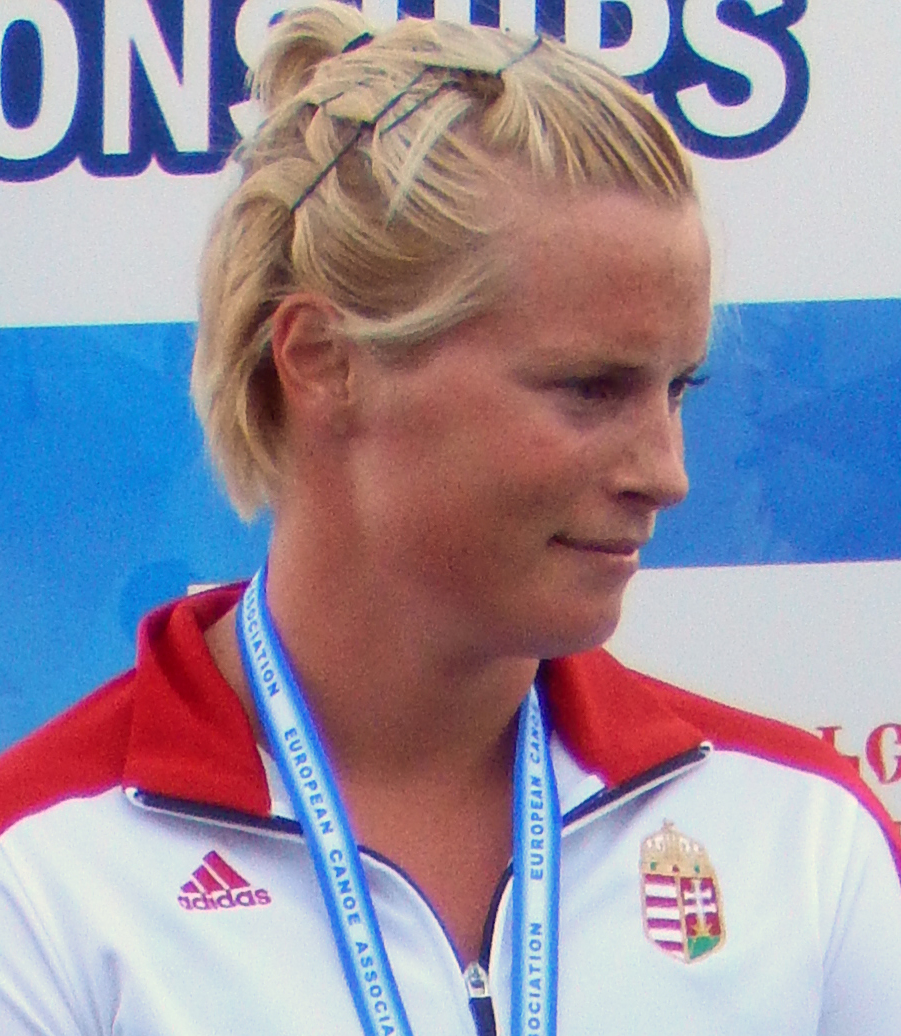
- Bodonyi in 2016

Personal information
- Nationality: Hungarian
- Born: 3 November 1993 (age 32) Szarvas

Sport
- Country: Hungary
- Sport: Sprint kayak
- Event(s): K-1 1000 m, K-1 5000 m, K-4 500 m
- Club: KÖZGÉP SE Szolnok
Medal record
Women's canoe sprint
Representing Hungary
Olympic Games
Gold medal – first place	2020 Tokyo	K-4 500 m
Bronze medal – third place	2020 Tokyo	K-2 500 m
World Championships
Gold medal – first place	2017 Račice	K-1 5000 m
Gold medal – first place	2018 Montemor-o-Velho	K-1 1000 m
Gold medal – first place	2018 Montemor-o-Velho	K-4 500 m
Gold medal – first place	2019 Szeged	K-1 5000 m
Gold medal – first place	2019 Szeged	K-4 500 m
Bronze medal – third place	2015 Milan	K-2 1000 m
European Games
Silver medal – second place	2019 Minsk	K-1 5000 m
European Championships
Gold medal – first place	2017 Plovdiv	K-1 1000 m
Gold medal – first place	2017 Plovdiv	K-1 5000 m
Gold medal – first place	2018 Belgrade	K-4 500 m
Gold medal – first place	2021 Poznań	K-1 5000 m
Gold medal – first place	2021 Poznań	K-2 500 m
Gold medal – first place	2021 Poznań	K-4 500 m
Silver medal – second place	2016 Moscow	K-1 5000 m

Dóra Bodonyi (born 7 November 1993) is a Hungarian sprint canoeist.

She participated at the 2018 ICF Canoe Sprint World Championships, winning a medal.
