= 2021 Canoe Sprint European Championships =

International canoeing and kayaking event

2021 European Championships
- Venue: Lake Malta
- Location: Poznań, Poland
- Dates: 3–6 June

The 2021 Canoe Sprint European Championships (31st) was held from 3 to 6 June 2021 in Poznań, Poland.

== Canoe sprint ==
=== Medal table ===
* Host nation (Poland)

Rank	Nation	Gold	Silver	Bronze	Total
1	Hungary	9	7	2	18
2	Germany	4	3	3	10
3	Belarus	3	3	2	8
4	Russia	2	2	5	9
5	Ukraine	2	2	4	8
6	Spain	2	1	0	3
7	Czech Republic	2	0	1	3
7	Denmark	2	0	1	3
9	Poland*	1	3	2	6
10	Italy	1	0	1	2
11	Slovenia	1	0	0	1
12	Portugal	0	2	1	3
12	Slovakia	0	2	1	3
14	Lithuania	0	1	3	4
15	Croatia	0	1	0	1
15	Great Britain	0	1	0	1
15	Moldova	0	1	0	1
18	Belgium	0	0	1	1
18	Romania	0	0	1	1
18	Sweden	0	0	1	1
Totals (20 entries)		29	29	29	87

=== Men ===
Event	Gold		Silver		Bronze	
C-1 200 m	Joan Moreno; Spain	40.770	Artsem Kozyr; Belarus	40.798	Henrikas Žustautas; Lithuania	40.960
C-1 500 m	Martin Fuksa; Czech Republic	1:49.259	Serghei Tarnovschi; Moldova	1:50.312	Conrad-Robin Scheibner; Germany	1:50.399
C-1 1000 m	Martin Fuksa; Czech Republic	4:06.417	Conrad-Robin Scheibner; Germany	4:07.842	Kirill Shamshurin; Russia	4:08.367
C-1 5000 m	Sebastian Brendel; Germany	23:22.446	Nicholas Fodor; Hungary	23:28.575	Carlo Tacchini; Italy	23:44.889
C-2 200 m	Spain; Alberto Pedrero; Pablo Graña	36.900	Poland; Arsen Śliwiński; Michał Łubniewski	37.006	Lithuania; Henrikas Žustautas; Vadim Korobov	37.300
C-2 500 m	Russia; Viktor Melantyev; Vladislav Chebotar	1:44.915	Germany; Sebastian Brendel; Tim Hecker	1:44.989	Ukraine; Vitaliy Vergeles; Andrii Rybachok	1:45.215
C-2 1000 m	Germany; Sebastian Brendel; Tim Hecker	3:42.555	Russia; Kirill Shamshurin; Ilya Pervukhin	3:44.811	Romania; Cătălin Chirilă; Victor Mihalachi	3:45.255
C-4 500 m	Not held					
K-1 200 m	Sándor Tótka; Hungary	35.385	Liam Heath; Great Britain	35.407	Petter Menning; Sweden	35.537
K-1 500 m	Bálint Kopasz; Hungary	1:40.831	João Ribeiro; Portugal	1:42.138	Jakub Zavřel; Czech Republic	1:42.391
K-1 1000 m	Bálint Kopasz; Hungary	3:41.232	Fernando Pimenta; Portugal	3:42.667	Artuur Peters; Belgium	3:44.367
K-1 5000 m	Bálint Noé; Hungary	20:44.405	Aleh Yurenia; Belarus	20:44.937	Fernando Pimenta; Portugal	20:45.277
K-2 200 m	Italy; Manfredi Rizza; Andrea Di Liberto	33.095	Lithuania; Artūras Seja; Ignas Navakauskas	33.355	Russia; Yury Postrigay; Alexander Dyachenko	33.653
K-2 500 m	Belarus; Uladzislau Litvinau; Dzmitry Natynchyk	1:30.334	Ukraine; Dmytro Danylenko; Oleh Kukharyk	1:31.101	Germany; Max Hoff; Jacob Schopf	1:31.215
K-2 1000 m	Germany; Max Hoff; Jacob Schopf	3:19.973	Slovakia; Samuel Baláž; Adam Botek	3:21.747	Lithuania; Ričardas Nekriošius; Andrejus Olijnikas	3:22.343
K-4 500 m	Germany; Max Rendschmidt; Tom Liebscher; Ronald Rauhe; Max Lemke	1:23.960	Slovakia; Samuel Baláž; Csaba Zalka; Denis Myšák; Adam Botek	1:25.395	Russia; Oleg Gusev; Aleksandr Sergeyev; Maxim Spesivtsev; Vitaly Ershov	1:25.425
K-4 1000 m	Belarus; Pavel Miadzvedzeu; Kiryl Nikitsin; Ilya Fedarenka; Vitaliy Bialko	3:02.023	Hungary; Bálint Noé; Péter Gál; Tamás Kulifai; Bence Dombvàri	3:02.696	Russia; Oleg Gusev; Maxim Spesivtsev; Oleg Siniavin; Vitaly Ershov	3:03.850

=== Women ===
Event	Gold		Silver		Bronze	
C-1 200 m	Dorota Borowska; Poland	46.888	Liudmyla Luzan; Ukraine	47.595	Olesia Romasenko; Russia	47.668
C-1 500 m	Liudmyla Luzan; Ukraine	2:07.235	Virág Balla; Hungary	2:13.332	Alena Nazdrova; Belarus	2:13.345
C-1 5000 m	Volha Klimava; Belarus	26:25.017	Dóra Horányi; Hungary	26:42.626	Liudmyla Babak; Ukraine	27:02.534
C-2 200 m	Russia; Irina Andreeva; Olesia Romasenko	43.824	Hungary; Virág Balla; Kincső Takács	45.001	Ukraine; Liudmyla Luzan; Anastasiia Chetverikova	45.204
C-2 500 m	Ukraine; Liudmyla Luzan; Anastasiia Chetverikova	2:06.252	Germany; Lisa Jahn; Sophie Koch	2:07.795	Hungary; Virág Balla; Kincső Takács	2:09.295
K-1 200 m	Emma Jørgensen; Denmark	41.746	Dóra Lucz; Hungary	42.336	Marta Walczykiewicz; Poland	42.526
K-1 500 m	Emma Jørgensen; Denmark	1:53.402	Danuta Kozák; Hungary	1:53.962	Mariya Povkh; Ukraine	1:55.119
K-1 1000 m	Alida Dóra Gazsó; Hungary	4:15.944	Anamaria Govorčinović; Croatia	4:18.568	Mariana Petrušová; Slovakia	4:19.895
K-1 5000 m	Dóra Bodonyi; Hungary	23:09.331	Elena Mironchenko; Russia	23:10.431	Sabrina Hering-Pradler; Germany	23:15.338
K-2 200 m	Slovenia; Špela Janić; Anja Osterman	36.772	Poland; Dominika Putto; Katarzyna Kołodziejczyk	37.157	Hungary; Anna Lucz; Blanka Kiss	37.190
K-2 500 m	Hungary; Danuta Kozák; Dóra Bodonyi	1:44.175	Poland; Karolina Naja; Anna Puławska	1:45.420	Belarus; Volha Khudzenka; Maryna Litvinchuk	1:45.450
K-2 1000 m	Hungary; Tamara Csipes; Erika Medveczky	3:40.532	Spain; Laia Pelachs; Begoña Lazkano	3:45.961	Poland; Martyna Klatt; Sandra Ostrowska	3:49.285
K-4 500 m	Hungary; Dóra Lucz; Tamara Csipes; Anna Kárász; Dóra Bodonyi	1:34.114	Belarus; Marharyta Makhneva; Volha Khudzenka; Nadzeya Papok; Maryna Litvinchuk	1:34.262	Denmark; Emma Jørgensen; Sara Milthers; Julie Funch; Bolette Iversen	1:35.500

== Paracanoe ==
=== Medal table ===
* Host nation (Poland)

Rank	Nation	Gold	Silver	Bronze	Total
1	Ukraine	4	0	1	5
2	Germany	2	0	2	4
3	Hungary	1	1	2	4
4	Ireland	1	0	0	1
4	Portugal	1	0	0	1
6	Italy	0	2	1	3
6	Russia	0	2	1	3
8	Spain	0	2	0	2
9	France	0	1	1	2
10	Austria	0	1	0	1
11	Poland*	0	0	1	1
Totals (11 entries)		9	9	9	27

=== Medal events ===
Non-Paralympic classes

Event	Gold		Silver		Bronze	
Men's KL1	Péter Kiss; Hungary	47.731	Esteban Farias; Italy	49.141	Róbert Suba; Hungary	49.797
Men's KL2	Mykola Syniuk; Ukraine	45.746	Marcus Swoboda; Austria	47.859	Federico Mancarella; Italy	42.107
Men's KL3	Serhii Yemelianov; Ukraine	40.817	Leonid Krylov; Russia	41.500	Artem Voronkov; Russia	42.107
Men's VL1 (Note: Not included in the medal table due to lack of participation)	Artur Chuprov; Russia	1:01.820	None awarded as only 1 boat competed			
Men's VL2	Norberto Mourão; Portugal	53.437	Higinio Rivero; Spain	54.444	Róbert Suba; Hungary	54.567
Men's VL3	Patrick O'Leary; Ireland	50.308	Adrián Mosquera; Spain	50.408	Eddie Potdevin; France	50.688
Women's KL1	Maryna Mazhula; Ukraine	58.316	Eleonora de Paolis; Italy	58.916	Edina Müller; Germany	1:01.116
Women's KL2	Anja Adler; Germany	54.615	Katalin Varga; Hungary	54.685	Nataliia Lagutenko; Ukraine	55.722
Women's KL3	Felicia Laberer; Germany	52.672	Nélia Barbosa; France	52.746	Katarzyna Kozikowska; Poland	53.272
Women's VL1	Lillemor Köper; Germany	1:23.135	Esther Bode; Germany	1:25.308	None awarded as only 2 boats competed	
Women's VL2	Maria Nikiforova; Russia	1:00.465	Katharina Bauernschmidt; Germany	1:03.799	Veronica Biglia; Italy	1:08.822
Women's VL3	Nataliia Lagutenko; Ukraine	1:01.137	Larisa Volik; Russia	1:01.167	Annette Kummer; Germany	1:06.724
