= Elena Aniushina =

Russian canoeist (born 1993)

Personal information
- Nationality: Russian
- Born: Еле́на Фёдоровна Аню́шина; 8 December 1993 (age 32) Zhabino, Russia

Sport
- Country: Russia
- Sport: Sprint kayak
Medal record
Women's sprint kayak
Representing Russia
World Championships
Bronze medal – third place	2021 Copenhagen	K-4 500 m

Elena Aniushina (born 8 December 1993) is a Russian sprint canoeist. She competed in the women's K-2 500 metres event at the 2016 Summer Olympics.
