= Ninetta Vad =

Hungarian sprint canoer (born 1989)

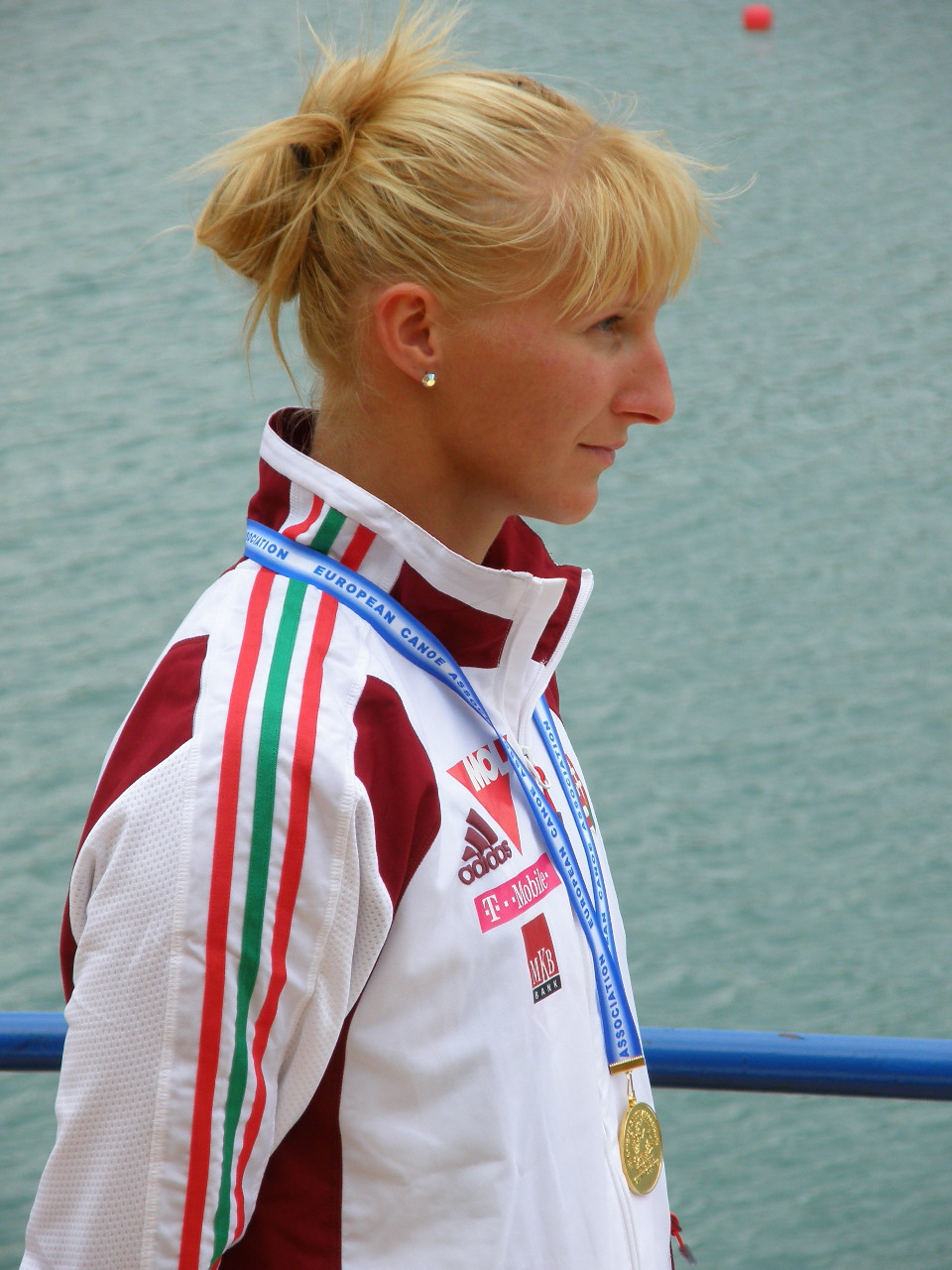

Personal information
- Born: 1989 (age 36–37)
Medal record
Women's canoe sprint
Representing Hungary
World Championships
Gold medal – first place	2013 Duisburg	K-1 4×200 m
Gold medal – first place	2013 Duisburg	K-4 500 m
Gold medal – first place	2014 Moscow	K-2 200 m
Gold medal – first place	2014 Moscow	K-4 500 m
Gold medal – first place	2017 Račice	K-4 500 m
Silver medal – second place	2010 Poznań	K-1 4×200 m
European Championships
Gold medal – first place	2014 Brandenburg	K-4 500 m
Silver medal – second place	2012 Zagreb	K-2 1000 m
Silver medal – second place	2014 Brandenburg	K-2 200 m

Ninetta Vad (born 1989) is a Hungarian sprint canoer who has competed since the late 2000s. She won a silver medal in the K-1 4 × 200 m event at the 2010 ICF Canoe Sprint World Championships in Poznań. In June 2015, she competed in the inaugural European Games, for Hungary in canoe sprint, more specifically, Women's K-2 500m and the K-4 500m Gabriella Szabó, Anna Kárász, and Danuta Kozák. She earned a bronze medal in the K-2 500m and a gold within the Women's K-4 500m.
