= Kristina Kovnir =

Russian canoeist

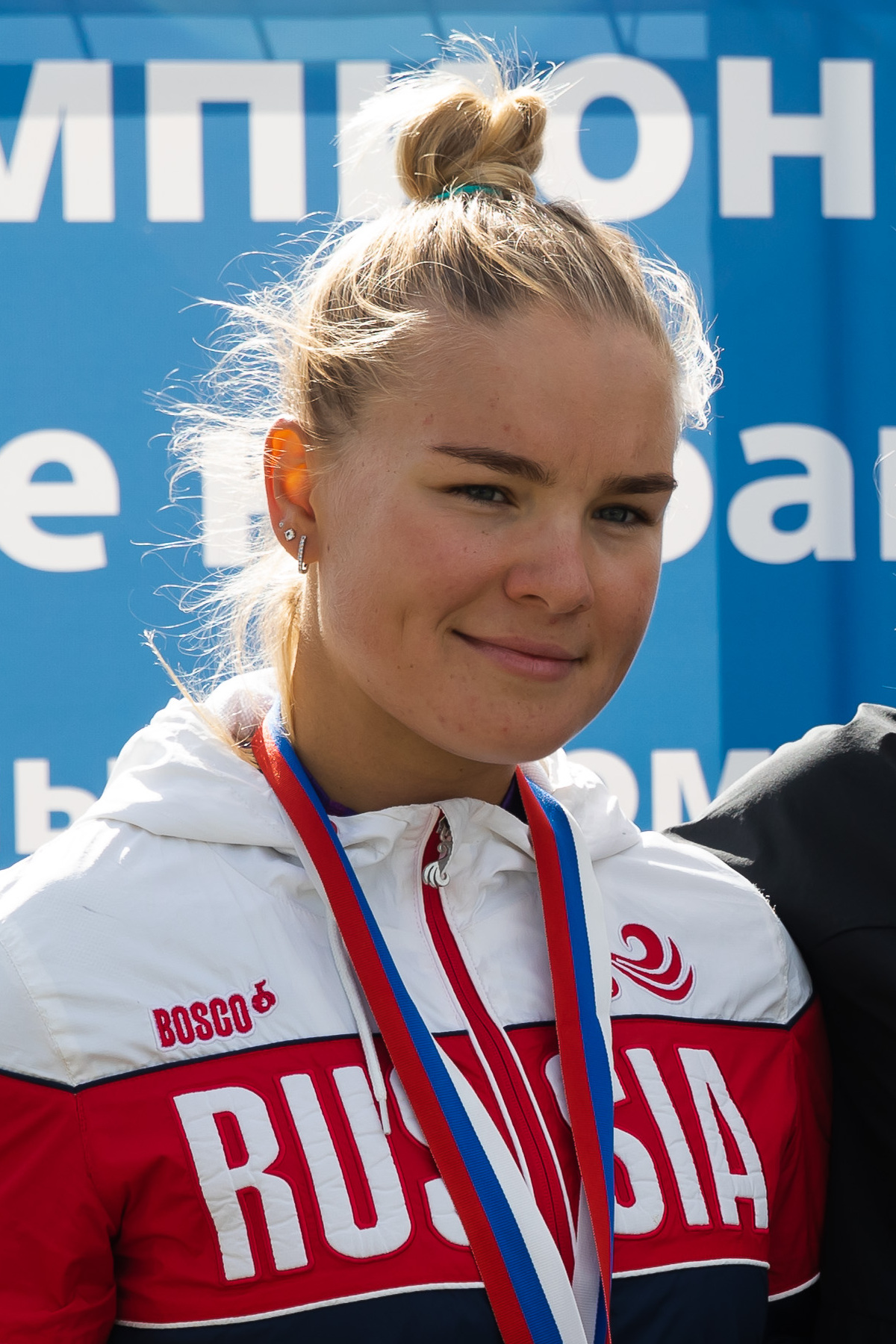
- Kristina Kovnir at the 2020 Russian Championships

Personal information
- Nationality: Russian
- Born: 26 September 1997 (age 28)

Sport
- Country: Russia
- Sport: Sprint kayak
Medal record
World Championships
| Gold medal – first place | 2021 Copenhagen | K-2 200 m |

Kristina Kovnir (born 26 September 1997) is a Russian sprint canoeist.

She competed at the 2021 ICF Canoe Sprint World Championships, winning a gold medal in the K-2 200 m distance.
