= Eef Haaze =

Dutch canoeist

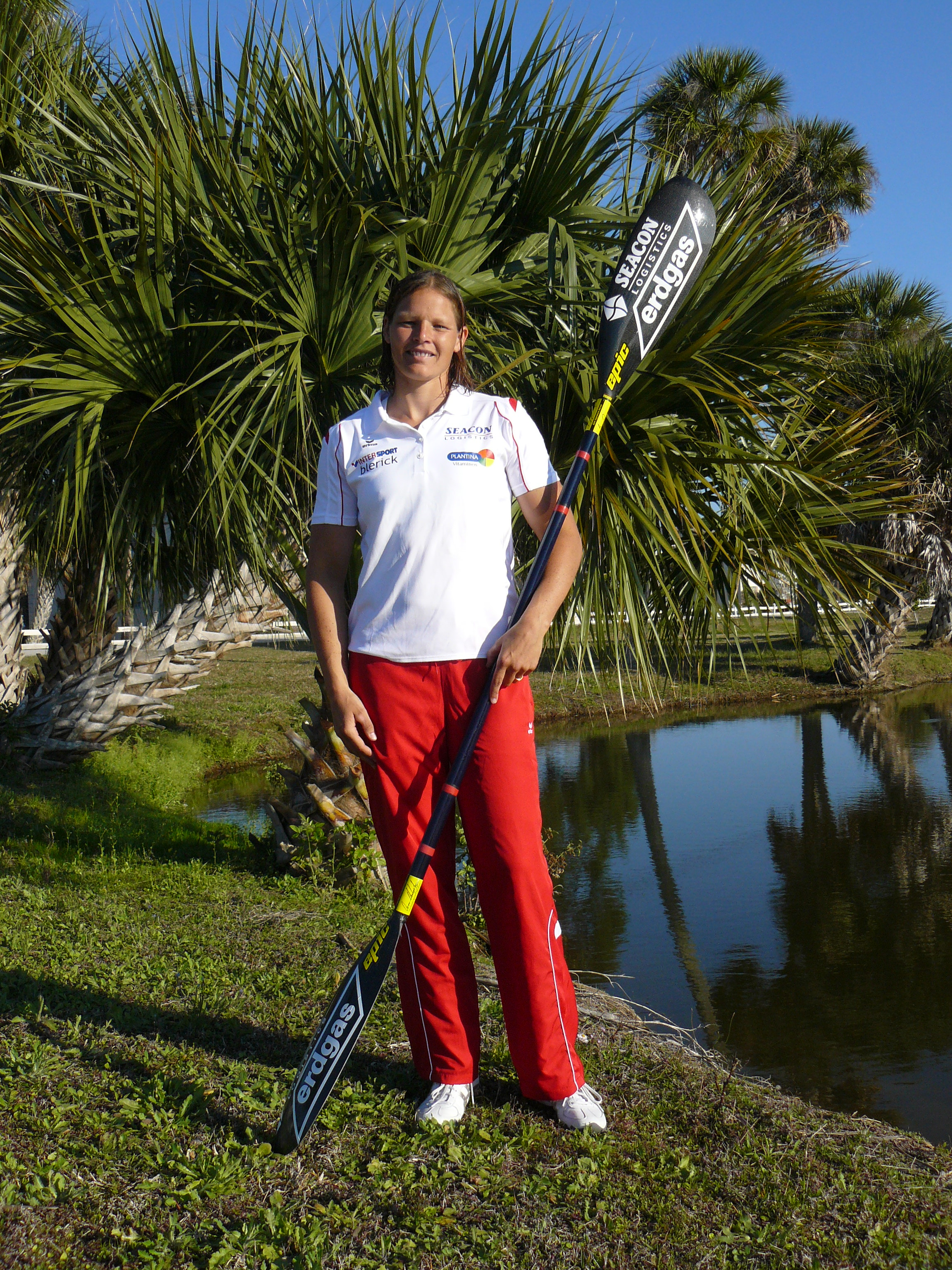

Personal information
- Nationality: Dutch
- Born: 11 August 1982 (age 43) Kampen, Netherlands
- Height: 1.78 m (5 ft 10 in)
- Weight: 70 kg (154 lb)

Sport
- Sport: Canoeing
- Event: Wildwater canoeing
- Club: KG Essen
- Coached by: Arndt Hanisch
Medal record
Event	1st	2nd	3rd
European Championships	0	1	0

Eef Haaze (born 11 August 1982) is a Dutch female canoeist who won a silver medal at individual senior level at the European Wildwater Championships.
