= Nadzeya Liapeshka =

Belarusian canoeist (born 1989)

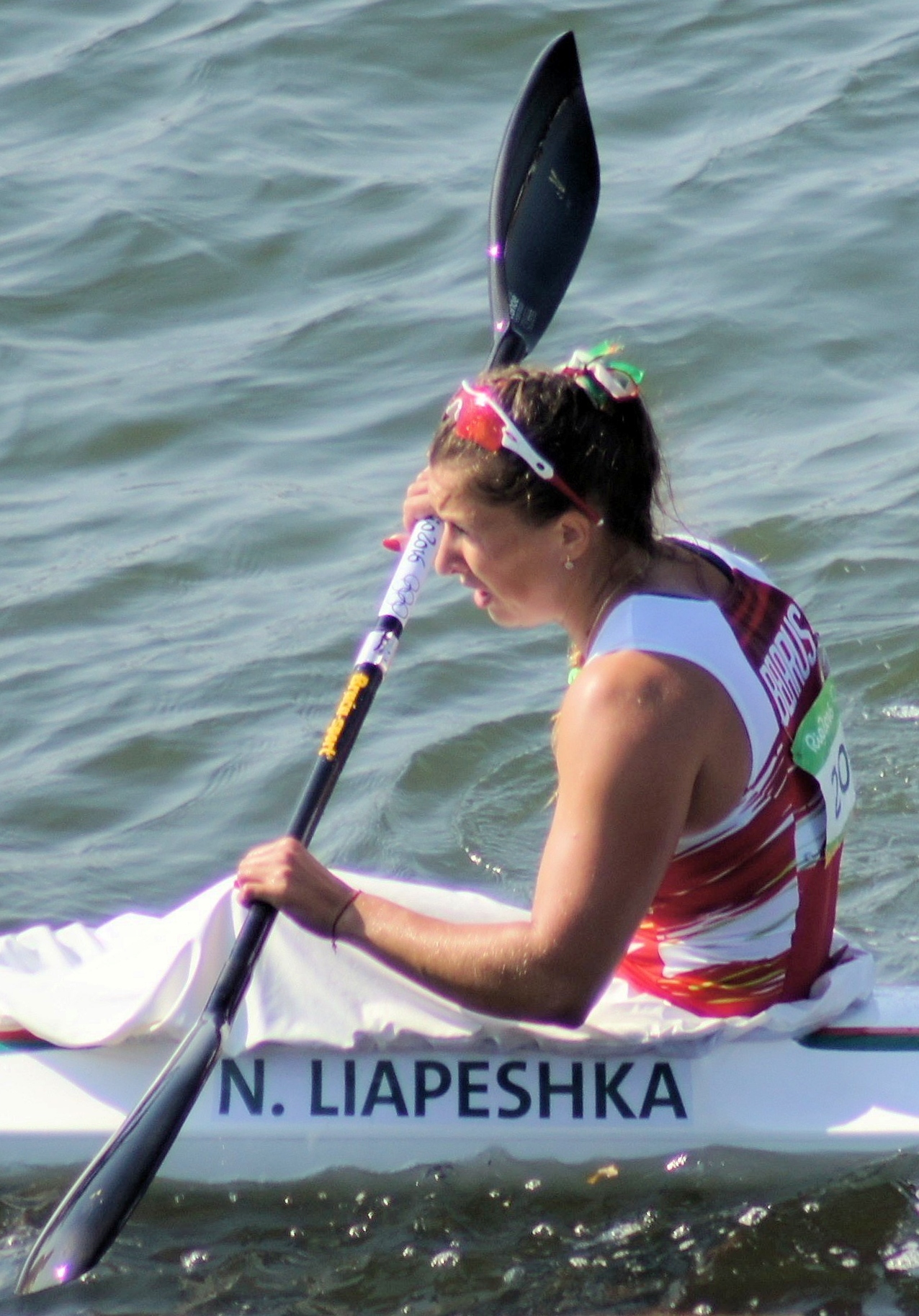
- Liapeshka at the 2016 Summer Olympics

Personal information
- Native name: Надзея Міхайлаўна Ляпешка (Папок)
- Nationality: Belarusian
- Born: 26 April 1989 (age 37) Pcič, Belarus
- Education: Mazyr State Pedagogical University
- Height: 172 cm (5 ft 8 in)
- Weight: 67 kg (148 lb)

Sport
- Country: Belarus
- Sport: Sprint kayak
- Coached by: Vitaly Gud
Medal record
Women's sprint kayak
Representing Belarus
Olympic Games
Silver medal – second place	2020 Tokyo	K-4 500 m
Bronze medal – third place	2012 London	K-4 500 m
Bronze medal – third place	2016 Rio de Janeiro	K-4 500 m
World Championships
Gold medal – first place	2015 Milan	K-4 500 m
Gold medal – first place	2021 Copenhagen	K-4 500 m
Silver medal – second place	2019 Szeged	K-4 500 m
Bronze medal – third place	2011 Szeged	K-4 500 m
Bronze medal – third place	2013 Duisburg	K-4 500 m
Bronze medal – third place	2014 Moscow	K-4 500 m
European Games
Silver medal – second place	2019 Minsk	K-4 500 m
European Championships
Gold medal – first place	2011 Belgrade	K-4 500 m
Silver medal – second place	2012 Zagreb	K-4 500 m
Silver medal – second place	2016 Moscow	K-4 500 m
Silver medal – second place	2018 Belgrade	K-4 500 m
Silver medal – second place	2021 Poznań	K-4 500 m
Bronze medal – third place	2013 Montemor-o-Velho	K-4 500 m
Bronze medal – third place	2016 Moscow	K-2 500 m
Universiade
Gold medal – first place	2013 Kazan	K-4 200 m
Gold medal – first place	2013 Kazan	K-4 500 m

Nadzeya Mikhaylauna Liapeshka (née Papok; Belarusian: Надзея Міхайлаўна Ляпешка (Папок); Łacinka: Nadzieja Michajłaŭna Liapieška; born 26 April 1989) is a Belarusian sprint canoeist.

She was born in Pcič. At the 2012 Summer Olympics in London, she won a bronze medal in the K-4 500 metres with teammates Volha Khudzenka, Iryna Pamialova, and Maryna Pautaran. At the 2016 Summer Olympics in Rio de Janeiro, she won bronze in the same event with Khudzenka, Maryna Litvinchuk, and Marharyta Makhneva. At the 2020 Summer Olympics, she won a silver medal in the Women's K-4 500 metres.

She competed at the 2014 ICF Canoe Sprint World Championships, the 2015 ICF Canoe Sprint World Championships, the 2018 ICF Canoe Sprint World Championships, and the 2019 ICF Canoe Sprint World Championships.
