= Zhabino, Vologda Oblast =

Zhabino Жабино
- Village
- Location within Vologda Oblast Location within Russia
- Coordinates: 59°23′N 38°33′E
- Country: Russia
- Region: Vologda Oblast
- District: Sheksninsky District
- Time zone: UTC+3:00

Zhabino (Russian: Жабино) is a rural locality (a village) in Sizemskoye Rural Settlement, Sheksninsky District, Vologda Oblast, Russia. The population was 36 as of 2002.

== Geography ==
Zhabino is located 61 km north of Sheksna (the district's administrative centre) by road. Ivashyovo is the nearest rural locality.
