= Sara Milthers =

Danish canoeist

Personal information
- Full name: Sara Corfixsen Milthers
- Born: 14 January 2002 (age 24)

Sport
- Sport: Canoe sprint
Medal record
Women's canoe sprint
Representing Denmark
European Games
Bronze medal – third place	2023 Kraków-Małopolska	K-4 500 m
European Championships
Silver medal – second place	2022 Munich	K-4 500 m
Bronze medal – third place	2021 Poznań	K-4 500 m

Sara Corfixsen Milthers (born 14 January 2002) is a Danish canoeist. She competed in the women's K-1 200 metres and the K-4 500 metres events at the 2020 Summer Olympics.
