= Norma Murabito =

Italian canoeist (born 1987)

Personal information
- Nationality: Italy
- Born: 12 October 1987 (age 39) Taormina, Messina, Italy
- Height: 1.62 m (5 ft 4 in)
- Weight: 58 kg (128 lb)

Sport
- Sport: Canoeing
- Event: Sprint canoe
- Club: Fiamme Azzurre; Circolo Canottieri Aniene
- Coached by: Stefano Grillo
Medal record
Women's canoe sprint
Mediterranean Games
Silver medal – second place	2013 Mersin	K-1 200 m

Norma Murabito (born 12 October 1987 in Taormina, Messina) is an Italian sprint canoeist. Murabito is a member of Aniene Canoeing Club (Italian: Circolo Canottieri Aniene) in Rome, and is coached and trained by Stefano Grillo.

Murabito qualified for the first ever women's K-1 200 metres at the 2012 Summer Olympics in London, by placing second from the European Qualification Tournament in Poznań, Poland. She paddled in the first heat against seven other canoeists, including three-time Olympic champion Nataša Dušev-Janić of Hungary, and New Zealand's Lisa Carrington, who eventually won the gold medal in the final. Murabito finished the race only in seventh place by nearly half a second (0.5) behind U.S. canoeist Carrie Johnson, with a time of 43.820 seconds. Murabito, however, failed to advance into the semi-finals, as she ranked twenty-fifth overall, and placed outside the qualifying spots for the next round.
