= Svetlana Chernigovskaya =

Russian sprint canoeist (born 1994)

Personal information
- Nationality: Russian
- Born: 14 April 1994 (age 32) Volzhsky, Volgograd Oblast, Russia

Sport
- Country: Russia
- Sport: Sprint kayak
- Coached by: Alexander Samokhotskiy
Medal record
Women's sprint kayak
Representing Russia
World Championships
Bronze medal – third place	2021 Copenhagen	K-4 500 m
European Championships
Bronze medal – third place	2015 Račice	K-4 500 m
Bronze medal – third place	2018 Belgrade	K-4 500 m
Representing ANA
World Championships
Gold medal – first place	2024 Samarkand	K-2 200 m

Svetlana Gennadiyevna Chernigovskaya (Russian: Светлана Геннадьевна Черниговская; born 14 April 1994) is a Russian sprint canoeist. She won two bronze medals in the Canoe Sprint European Championships in 2015 and 2018, both in the K4 500 m event.

== Major results ==
=== Olympic Games ===
Year	K-1 500	K-2 500	K-4 500
2020	2 FB	8 SF	4 FB

=== World championships ===
Year	K-1 500	K-1 1000	K-2 200	K-2 500	K-2 1000	K-4 500
2013					9	
2015						5 FB
2018				6 SF	4	4 SF
2019	8	9				
2021	9 SF					3rd place, bronze medalist(s)
2024	—N/a		1st place, gold medalist(s)	—N/a	—N/a	—N/a
