= Martina Kohlová =

Slovak sprint canoer (born 1984)

Medal record

Women's canoe sprint

World Championships
Silver medal – second place	2007 Duisburg	K-2 200 m
Bronze medal – third place	2009 Dartmouth	K-2 200 m
Bronze medal – third place	2010 Poznań	K-2 200 m

Martina Kohlová (born 16 November 1984) is a Slovak sprint canoer who has competed since the late 2000s. She won three medals in the K-2 200 m event at the ICF Canoe Sprint World Championships with a silver in 2007 and two bronzes (2009, 2010).

Koholová was eliminated in the semifinals of the K-2 500 m event at the 2008 Summer Olympics in Beijing and at the 2012 Summer Olympics in London.
