= Marharyta Makhneva =

Belarusian canoeist (born 1992)

Marharyta Makhneva (Tsishkevich)
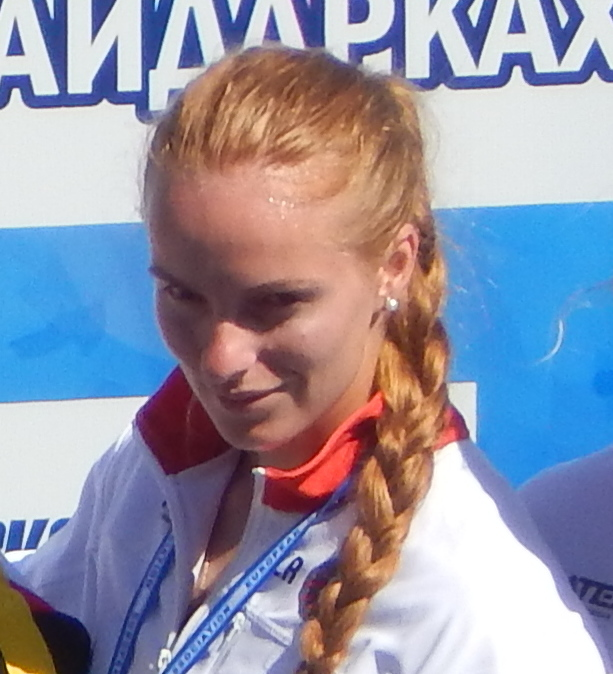
- Makhneva in 2016

Personal information
- Native name: Маргарыта Рыгораўна Махнева (Цішкевіч)
- Nationality: Belarusian
- Born: 13 February 1992 (age 34) Khoiniki, Belarus
- Height: 1.81 m (5 ft 11 in)
- Weight: 67 kg (148 lb)

Sport
- Country: Belarus
- Sport: Sprint kayak
- Club: Sport Club of the Professional Unions of the Republic of Belarus
Medal record
Women's sprint kayak
Representing Belarus
Olympic Games
Silver medal – second place	2020 Tokyo	K-4 500 m
Bronze medal – third place	2016 Rio de Janeiro	K-4 500 m
World Championships
Gold medal – first place	2015 Milan	K-2 200 m
Gold medal – first place	2015 Milan	K-4 500 m
Gold medal – first place	2021 Copenhagen	K-4 500 m
Silver medal – second place	2019 Szeged	K-4 500 m
Bronze medal – third place	2013 Duisburg	K-4 500 m
Bronze medal – third place	2014 Moscow	K-2 200 m
Bronze medal – third place	2014 Moscow	K-4 500 m
Bronze medal – third place	2014 Moscow	K-1 4×200 m
European Games
Gold medal – first place	2015 Baku	K-2 200 m
Silver medal – second place	2019 Minsk	K-4 500 m
European Championships
Gold medal – first place	2014 Brandenburg	K-2 200 m
Gold medal – first place	2015 Račice	K-2 200 m
Gold medal – first place	2015 Račice	K-4 500 m
Silver medal – second place	2016 Moscow	K-4 500 m
Silver medal – second place	2021 Poznań	K-4 500 m
Bronze medal – third place	2013 Montemor-o-Velho	K-4 500 m
Bronze medal – third place	2016 Moscow	K-2 200 m
Universiade
Gold medal – first place	2013 Kazan	K-2 500 m
Gold medal – first place	2013 Kazan	K-4 200 m
Silver medal – second place	2013 Kazan	K-1 200 m
Representing ANA
World Championships
Bronze medal – third place	2025 Milan	K-4 500 m
European Championships
Bronze medal – third place	2026 Montemor-o-Velho	K-4 500 m

Marharyta Ryhorauna Makhneva, née Tsishkevich, Belarusian: Маргарыта Рыгораўна Махнева (Цішкевіч); Łacinka: Marharyta Ryhoraŭna Machnieva (Ciškievič); born 13 February 1992) is a Belarusian sprint canoeist. She won two gold medals at the 2015 World Championships (K-2 200 m and K-4 500 m) and the bronze medal in Women's K-4 500 metres at the 2016 Summer Olympics. She won a silver medal at the 2020 Summer Olympics, in Women's K-4 500 metres.

== Career ==
Tsishkevich represented Belarus at the 2012 Summer Olympics in London, where she competed only in two individual sprint kayak events. For her first event, the women's K-1 500 metres, she advanced directly into the semi-final rounds, after placing sixth in the heats, with a time of 2:01.216. She was disqualified from the second semi-final race for breaking the four-metre "centre-lane" rule. In the first ever women's K-1 200 metres, Tsishkevich repeated her last-place finish in the same heat by approximately twenty-one hundredths of a second (0.21) behind Denmark's Henriette Engel Hansen, clocking at 43.033 seconds.

At the 2016 Summer Olympics in Rio de Janeiro, Makhneva won bronze in the women's K-4 500 metres with Volha Khudzenka, Nadzeya Liapeshka, and Maryna Litvinchuk.

== Personal life ==
Makhneva initially trained in judo, but quit, fearing that she will be prone to injuries due to her tall stature. She is married to the fellow Olympic canoeist Vadzim Makhneu. They have a son, Marsel, born in January 2018. Makhnev has a law degree from the Academy of Public Administration (Belarus).
