= Ana Varela =

Spanish canoeist

Personal information
- Full name: Ana Varela Iglesias
- Born: 17 June 1983 (age 43)
Medal record
Women's canoe sprint
Representing Spain
World Championships
Bronze medal – third place	2005 Zagreb	K-4 200 m

Ana Varela Iglesias (Note: In this Spanish name, the first or paternal surname is Varela and the second or maternal family name is Iglesias.) (born 17 June 1983) is a Spanish sprint canoer who competed in the mid-2000s. She won a bronze medal in the K-4 200 m event at the 2005 ICF Canoe Sprint World Championships in Zagreb.
