= Volha Khudzenka =

Belarusian canoeist (born 1992)

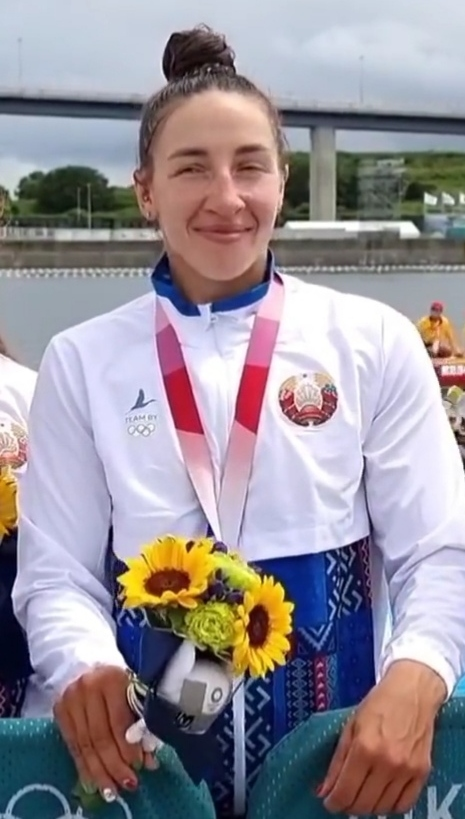
- Khudzenka in 2021

Personal information
- Native name: Вольга Сяргееўна Худзенка
- Nationality: Belarusian
- Born: 12 May 1992 (age 34) Hoiniki, Belarus
- Education: Mazyr State Pedagogical University
- Height: 178 cm (5 ft 10 in)
- Weight: 78 kg (172 lb)

Sport
- Country: Belarus
- Sport: Sprint kayak
- Club: Sport Club of the Professional Unions
- Coached by: Mihail Azemsha (personal); Henadzi Halitski (club); Vladimir Shantarovich (national)
Medal record
Women's sprint kayak
Representing Belarus
Olympic Games
Silver medal – second place	2020 Tokyo	K-4 500 m
Bronze medal – third place	2012 London	K-4 500 m
Bronze medal – third place	2016 Rio de Janeiro	K-4 500 m
World Championships
Gold medal – first place	2015 Milan	K-4 500 m
Gold medal – first place	2017 Račice	K-1 500 m
Gold medal – first place	2019 Szeged	K-2 200 m
Gold medal – first place	2019 Szeged	K-2 500 m
Gold medal – first place	2021 Copenhagen	K-4 500 m
Silver medal – second place	2019 Szeged	K-1 500 m
Silver medal – second place	2019 Szeged	K-4 500 m
Silver medal – second place	2021 Copenhagen	K-2 500 m
Bronze medal – third place	2011 Szeged	K-4 500 m
Bronze medal – third place	2013 Duisburg	K-4 500 m
Bronze medal – third place	2014 Moscow	K-4 500 m
Bronze medal – third place	2014 Moscow	K-1 4×200 m
Bronze medal – third place	2018 Montemor-o-Velho	K-1 500 m
European Games
Gold medal – first place	2019 Minsk	K-1 500 m
Gold medal – first place	2019 Minsk	K-2 500 m
Silver medal – second place	2019 Minsk	K-4 500 m
Bronze medal – third place	2019 Minsk	K-2 200 m
European Championships
Gold medal – first place	2011 Belgrade	K-4 500 m
Gold medal – first place	2015 Račice	K-4 500 m
Silver medal – second place	2012 Zagreb	K-4 500 m
Silver medal – second place	2012 Zagreb	K-2 200 m
Silver medal – second place	2012 Zagreb	K-2 500 m
Silver medal – second place	2016 Moscow	K-4 500 m
Silver medal – second place	2017 Plovdiv	K-1 500 m
Silver medal – second place	2018 Belgrade	K-1 500 m
Silver medal – second place	2018 Belgrade	K-4 500 m
Silver medal – second place	2021 Poznań	K-4 500 m
Bronze medal – third place	2011 Belgrade	K-2 200 m
Bronze medal – third place	2013 Montemor-o-Velho	K-4 500 m
Bronze medal – third place	2021 Poznań	K-2 500 m
Universiade
Gold medal – first place	2013 Kazan	K-2 200 m
Gold medal – first place	2013 Kazan	K-4 200 m
Gold medal – first place	2013 Kazan	K-4 500 m
Representing ANA
World Championships
Gold medal – first place	2024 Samarkand	K-4 Mix 500 m
Silver medal – second place	2024 Samarkand	K-2 Mix 500 m
Silver medal – second place	2024 Samarkand	K-2 200 m

Volha Siarheyeuna Khudzenka (Belarusian: Вольга Сяргееўна Худзенка; Łacinka: Volha Siarhiejeŭna Chudzienka; born 12 May 1992) is a Belarusian sprint canoeist.

== Career ==
At the 2012 Summer Olympics in London, she won a bronze medal in the K-4 500 metres with teammates Iryna Pamialova, Nadzeya Papok, and Maryna Pautaran. At the 2016 Summer Olympics in Rio de Janeiro, she won bronze in the same event with Nadzeya Liapeshka, Maryna Litvinchuk, and Marharyta Makhneva. At the 2020 Summer Olympics, she won a silver medal in Women's K-4 500 metres.

She competed at the 2014 ICF Canoe Sprint World Championships, 2015 ICF Canoe Sprint World Championships, 2017 ICF Canoe Sprint World Championships, 2018 ICF Canoe Sprint World Championships, and 2019 ICF Canoe Sprint World Championships.

== Major results ==
=== Olympic Games ===
Year	K-1 500	K-2 500	K-4 500
2012		1 FB	3rd place, bronze medalist(s)
2016			3rd place, bronze medalist(s)
2020	6 FB	6	2nd place, silver medalist(s)

=== World championships ===
Year	K-1 500	K-2 200	K-2 500	K-4 500	XK-2 500	XK-4 500	K–1 4 × 200
2011		5		1st place, gold medalist(s)	—N/a	—N/a	
2013		6	5	3rd place, bronze medalist(s)	—N/a	—N/a	
2014	1 FC			3rd place, bronze medalist(s)	—N/a	—N/a	3rd place, bronze medalist(s)
2015	7			1st place, gold medalist(s)	—N/a	—N/a	—N/a
2017	1st place, gold medalist(s)	5			—N/a	—N/a	—N/a
2018	3rd place, bronze medalist(s)			4	—N/a	—N/a	—N/a
2019	2nd place, silver medalist(s)	1st place, gold medalist(s)	1st place, gold medalist(s)	2nd place, silver medalist(s)	—N/a	—N/a	—N/a
2021		4	2nd place, silver medalist(s)	1st place, gold medalist(s)	—N/a	—N/a	—N/a
2024	—N/a	3rd place, bronze medalist(s)	—N/a	—N/a	2nd place, silver medalist(s)	1st place, gold medalist(s)	—N/a
