= Liudmyla Kuklinovska =

Ukrainian canoeist (born 1998)

Personal information
- Nationality: Ukrainian
- Born: 4 January 1998 (age 28) Mykolaiv, Ukraine
- Height: 1.66 m (5 ft 5 in)
- Weight: 61 kg (134 lb)

Sport
- Country: Ukraine
- Sport: Canoe
Medal record
Women's canoe sprint
Representing Ukraine
World Championships
Gold medal – first place	2024 Samarkand	K-1 200 m
European Games
Gold medal – first place	2019 Minsk	K-2 200 m

Liudmyla Olehivna Kuklinovska (Ukrainian: Людмила Олегівна Кукліновська; born 4 January 1998) is a Ukrainian canoeist. She is champion of the 2019 European Games in Minsk

== Major results ==
=== Olympic Games ===
Year	K-2 500	K-4 500
2020	6 QF	2 FB

=== World championships ===
Year	K-1 200	K-2 200	K-2 500
2017	4 FB		4
2018			6
2019		5	6
2022		6	3 FB
2024	1st place, gold medalist(s)		—N/a
