= Maryna Litvinchuk =

Belarusian canoeist (born 1988)

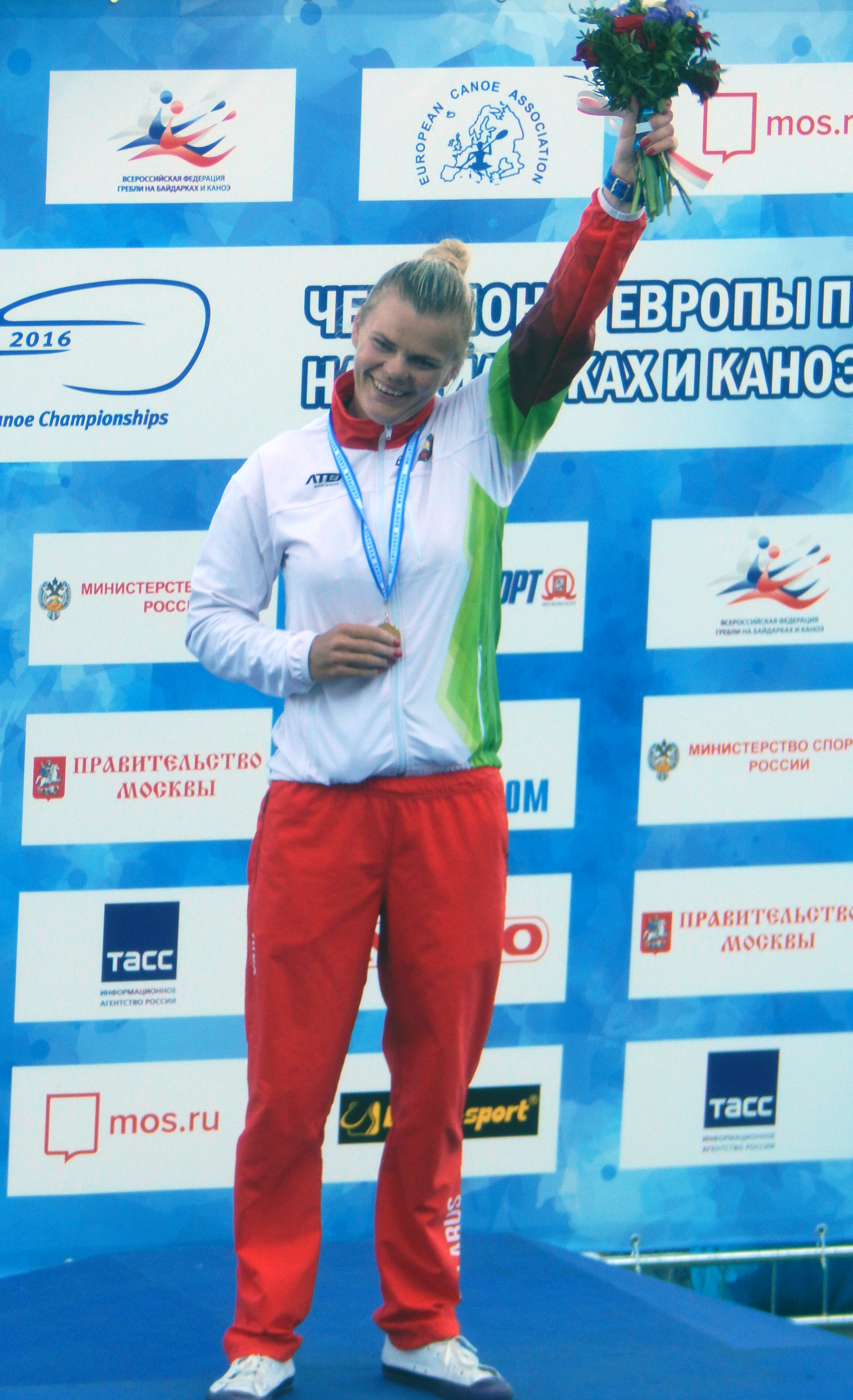
- Litvinchuk at the 2016 European Championships in Moscow

Personal information
- Native name: Марына Віктараўна Літвінчук (Паўтаран)
- Nationality: Belarusian
- Born: Maryna Pautaran; 12 March 1988 (age 38) Sotničy, Gomel Region, Belarus
- Education: Mazyr State Pedagogical University
- Height: 178 cm (5 ft 10 in)
- Weight: 68 kg (150 lb)

Sport
- Country: Belarus
- Sport: Sprint kayak
- Club: Dinamo Sport Club
- Coached by: Vitaly Skriganov
Medal record
Women's sprint kayak
Representing Belarus
Olympic Games
Silver medal – second place	2020 Tokyo	K-4 500 m
Bronze medal – third place	2012 London	K-4 500 m
Bronze medal – third place	2016 Rio de Janeiro	K-4 500 m
World Championships
Gold medal – first place	2015 Milan	K-1 5000 m
Gold medal – first place	2015 Milan	K-2 200 m
Gold medal – first place	2015 Milan	K-4 500 m
Gold medal – first place	2019 Szeged	K-2 200 m
Gold medal – first place	2019 Szeged	K-2 500 m
Gold medal – first place	2021 Copenhagen	K-4 500 m
Silver medal – second place	2010 Poznań	K-1 5000 m
Silver medal – second place	2014 Moscow	K-1 5000 m
Silver medal – second place	2018 Montemor-o-Velho	K-1 5000 m
Silver medal – second place	2019 Szeged	K-4 500 m
Silver medal – second place	2021 Copenhagen	K-2 500 m
Bronze medal – third place	2011 Szeged	K-1 5000 m
Bronze medal – third place	2011 Szeged	K-4 500 m
Bronze medal – third place	2013 Duisburg	K-4 500 m
Bronze medal – third place	2014 Moscow	K-2 200 m
Bronze medal – third place	2014 Moscow	K-4 500 m
Bronze medal – third place	2014 Moscow	K-1 4×200 m
Bronze medal – third place	2019 Szeged	K-1 5000 m
European Games
Gold medal – first place	2015 Baku	K-1 5000 m
Gold medal – first place	2015 Baku	K-2 200 m
Gold medal – first place	2019 Minsk	K-1 5000 m
Gold medal – first place	2019 Minsk	K-2 500 m
Silver medal – second place	2019 Minsk	K-4 500 m
Bronze medal – third place	2019 Minsk	K-2 200 m
European Championships
Gold medal – first place	2011 Belgrade	K-1 5000 m
Gold medal – first place	2011 Belgrade	K-4 500 m
Gold medal – first place	2014 Brandenburg	K-2 200 m
Gold medal – first place	2015 Račice	K-1 5000 m
Gold medal – first place	2015 Račice	K-2 200 m
Gold medal – first place	2015 Račice	K-4 500 m
Gold medal – first place	2016 Moscow	K-1 5000 m
Silver medal – second place	2012 Zagreb	K-2 200 m
Silver medal – second place	2012 Zagreb	K-2 500 m
Silver medal – second place	2012 Zagreb	K-4 500 m
Silver medal – second place	2014 Brandenburg	K-1 5000 m
Silver medal – second place	2016 Moscow	K-4 500 m
Silver medal – second place	2018 Belgrade	K-4 500 m
Silver medal – second place	2021 Poznań	K-4 500 m
Bronze medal – third place	2010 Trasona	K-1 5000 m
Bronze medal – third place	2011 Belgrade	K-2 200 m
Bronze medal – third place	2016 Moscow	K-2 200 m
Bronze medal – third place	2016 Moscow	K-2 500 m
Bronze medal – third place	2021 Poznań	K-2 500 m
Representing ANA
World Championships
Silver medal – second place	2024 Samarkand	K-1 1000 m
Silver medal – second place	2024 Samarkand	K-1 5000 m
Silver medal – second place	2024 Samarkand	K-2 200 m

Maryna Viktarauna Litvinchuk, née Pautaran/Poltoran (Belarusian: Марына Віктараўна Літвінчук (Паўтаран); Łacinka: Maryna Viktaraŭna Litvinčuk, born 12 March 1988) is a Belarusian sprint canoeist.

== Career ==
At the 2012 Summer Olympics in London, she won a bronze medal in the K-4 500 metres with teammates Volha Khudzenka, Iryna Pamialova, and Nadzeya Papok. At the 2016 Summer Olympics in Rio de Janeiro, she won bronze in the same event with Khudzenka, Papok, and Marharyta Makhneva. At the 2020 Summer Olympics, she won a silver medal in Women's K-4 500 metres.

She competed at the 2014 ICF Canoe Sprint World Championships, 2015 ICF Canoe Sprint World Championships, 2018 ICF Canoe Sprint World Championships, and 2019 ICF Canoe Sprint World Championships.

== Major results ==
=== Olympic Games ===
Year	K-1 500	K-2 500	K-4 500
2012		1 FB	3rd place, bronze medalist(s)
2016	4	6	3rd place, bronze medalist(s)
2020	6 FC	6	2nd place, silver medalist(s)

=== World championships ===
Year	K-1 1000	K-1 5000	K-2 200	K-2 500	K-4 500	K-1 4 × 200
2010		2nd place, silver medalist(s)			5 FB	4 H
2011		3rd place, bronze medalist(s)	5		3rd place, bronze medalist(s)	
2013			6	5	3rd place, bronze medalist(s)	5
2014		2nd place, silver medalist(s)	3rd place, bronze medalist(s)	4	3rd place, bronze medalist(s)	3rd place, bronze medalist(s)
2015		1st place, gold medalist(s)	1st place, gold medalist(s)	1 FB	1st place, gold medalist(s)	—N/a
2018		2nd place, silver medalist(s)	7		4	—N/a
2019		3rd place, bronze medalist(s)	1st place, gold medalist(s)	1st place, gold medalist(s)	2nd place, silver medalist(s)	—N/a
2021			4	2nd place, silver medalist(s)	1st place, gold medalist(s)	—N/a
2024	2nd place, silver medalist(s)	2nd place, silver medalist(s)	3rd place, bronze medalist(s)	—N/a	—N/a	—N/a

== Personal life ==
She is married to Belarusian sprint canoeist Artur Litvinchuk. They have a child born in January 2018.
