= Jasmin Fritz =

German sprint canoeist

Personal information
- Nationality: German
- Born: 1996 (age 29–30)

Sport
- Country: Germany
- Sport: Canoe sprint
- Event: Kayaking
- Club: Hallescher Kanu-Club 54 e.V.
Medal record
World Championships
Bronze medal – third place	2018 Montemor-o-Velho	K-2 500 m

Jasmin Fritz (born 1996) is a German sprint canoeist.

She participated at the 2018 ICF Canoe Sprint World Championships, winning a medal.
