= Katarzyna Kołodziejczyk =

Polish canoeist (born 1998)

Personal information
- Nationality: Polish
- Born: 7 April 1998 (age 28) Kalisz, Poland

Sport
- Country: Poland
- Sport: Sprint kayak
Medal record
Women's canoe sprint
Representing Poland
World Championships
Bronze medal – third place	2018 Montemor-o-Velho	K-4 500 m
Bronze medal – third place	2019 Szeged	K-4 500 m
Bronze medal – third place	2021 Copenhagen	K-2 200 m
European Games
Bronze medal – third place	2019 Minsk	K-4 500 m
European Championships
Silver medal – second place	2017 Plovdiv	K-4 500 m
Silver medal – second place	2021 Poznań	K-2 200 m
Silver medal – second place	2022 Munich	K-2 1000 m
Silver medal – second place	2022 Munich	K-2 200 m
Silver medal – second place	2024 Szeged	K-1 200 m
Silver medal – second place	2024 Szeged	K-2 500 m
Silver medal – second place	2024 Szeged	K-4 500 m
Bronze medal – third place	2017 Plovdiv	K-2 200 m
Bronze medal – third place	2018 Belgrade	K-2 200 m
Bronze medal – third place	2024 Szeged	K-2 200 m

Katarzyna Kołodziejczyk (born 7 April 1998) is a Polish sprint canoeist.

== Career ==
She participated at the 2018 ICF Canoe Sprint World Championships, winning a bronze medal.
