= Anastasia Panchenko =

Russian canoeist (born 1990)

Personal information
- Full name: Anastasia Anatolyevna Panchenko
- Nationality: Russian
- Born: 3 May 1990 (age 36) Omsk, Russia

Sport
- Country: Russia
- Sport: Sprint kayak
Medal record
Women's sprint kayak
Representing Russia
World Championships
Silver medal – second place	2014 Moscow	K-1 4×200 m
Bronze medal – third place	2010 Poznań	K-1 4×200 m
Bronze medal – third place	2021 Copenhagen	K-4 500 m
European Games
Bronze medal – third place	2019 Minsk	K-2 500 m
European Championships
Bronze medal – third place	2018 Belgrade	K-4 500 m

Anastasia Anatolyevna Panchenko (Russian: Анастасия Анатольевна Панченко; born 3 May 1990) is a Russian sprint canoeist who has competed since the late 2000s. At the 2010 ICF Canoe Sprint World Championships in Poznań, she won a bronze medal in the K-1 4 × 200 m event.
