= Anna Kárász =

Hungarian canoeist (born 1991)

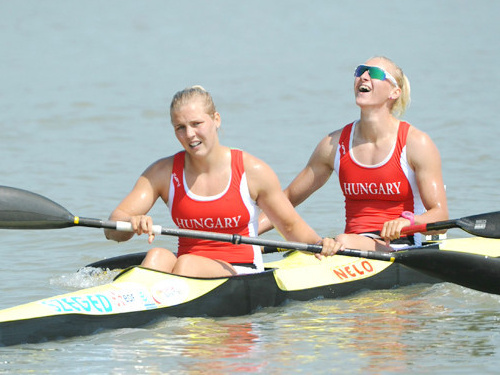
- Kárász and Ninetta Vad in 2013

Personal information
- Nationality: Hungarian
- Born: 20 September 1991 (age 34) Dunaújváros, Hungary
- Height: 1.72 m (5 ft 8 in)
- Weight: 65 kg (143 lb)

Sport
- Country: Hungary
- Sport: Sprint kayak
- Club: EDF Demasz-Szeged
Medal record
Women's sprint kayak
Representing Hungary
Olympic Games
Gold medal – first place	2020 Tokyo	K-4 500 m
World Championships
Gold medal – first place	2014 Moscow	K-2 200 m
Gold medal – first place	2014 Moscow	K-4 500 m
Gold medal – first place	2018 Montemor-o-Velho	K-2 500 m
Gold medal – first place	2018 Montemor-o-Velho	K-4 500 m
Silver medal – second place	2015 Milan	K-1 500 m
Silver medal – second place	2015 Milan	K-4 500 m
Silver medal – second place	2021 Copenhagen	K-4 500 m
European Games
Gold medal – first place	2015 Baku	K-4 500 m
Gold medal – first place	2019 Minsk	K-4 500 m
Silver medal – second place	2019 Minsk	K-2 500 m
Bronze medal – third place	2015 Baku	K-2 500 m
European Championships
Gold medal – first place	2013 Montemor-o-Velho	K-4 500 m
Gold medal – first place	2014 Brandenburg	K-4 500 m
Gold medal – first place	2018 Belgrade	K-4 500 m
Gold medal – first place	2021 Poznań	K-4 500 m
Silver medal – second place	2011 Belgrade	K-4 500 m
Silver medal – second place	2012 Zagreb	K-2 1000 m
Silver medal – second place	2014 Brandenburg	K-2 200 m

Anna Kárász (born 20 September 1991) is a Hungarian sprint canoeist. She won a gold medal at the 2020 Summer Olympics, in Women's K-4 500 metres.

== Career ==
She participated at the 2018 ICF Canoe Sprint World Championships, winning a medal. At the 2019 ICF Canoe Sprint World Championships she and her partner Danuta Kozák were disqualified, since their boat weighed in light. She competed at the 2013, 2014, 2015, 2018, and 2021 Canoe Sprint World Cup.

== Honors ==
She was named the 2014 Young Female Athlete of the Year by the Hungarian Olympic Committee.
