= Viktoria Schwarz =

Austrian canoeist (born 1985)

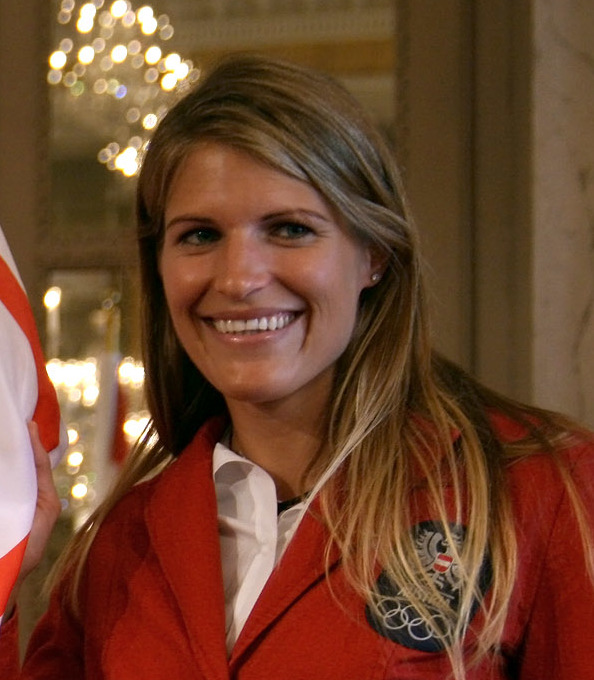
- Schwarz in 2012

Personal information
- Born: 2 July 1985 (age 41) Linz, Austria
- Height: 173 cm (5 ft 8 in)
- Weight: 65 kg (143 lb)

Sport
- Club: Schnecke Linz
- Coached by: Stjepan Janić
Medal record
Women's canoe sprint
Representing Austria
World Championships
Gold medal – first place	2011 Szeged	K-2 500 m
Silver medal – second place	2005 Zagreb	K-2 500 m
Bronze medal – third place	2010 Poznań	K-2 500 m

Viktoria "Vicki" Schwarz (born 2 July 1985 in Linz) is an Austrian sprint canoer who has competed since the mid-2000s. She has won three medals in the K-2 500 m event at the ICF Canoe Sprint World Championships, a gold in 2011, a silver in 2005 and a bronze in 2010. The silver medal was won with Petra Schlitzer, while the gold and bronze were won with Yvonne Schuring.

Schwarz and Schuring also finished ninth in the K-2 500 m event at the 2008 Summer Olympics in Beijing. At the 2012 Summer Olympics, the team of Schwarz and Schuring improved to 5th place.
