= Manon Hostens =

French canoeist (born 1994)

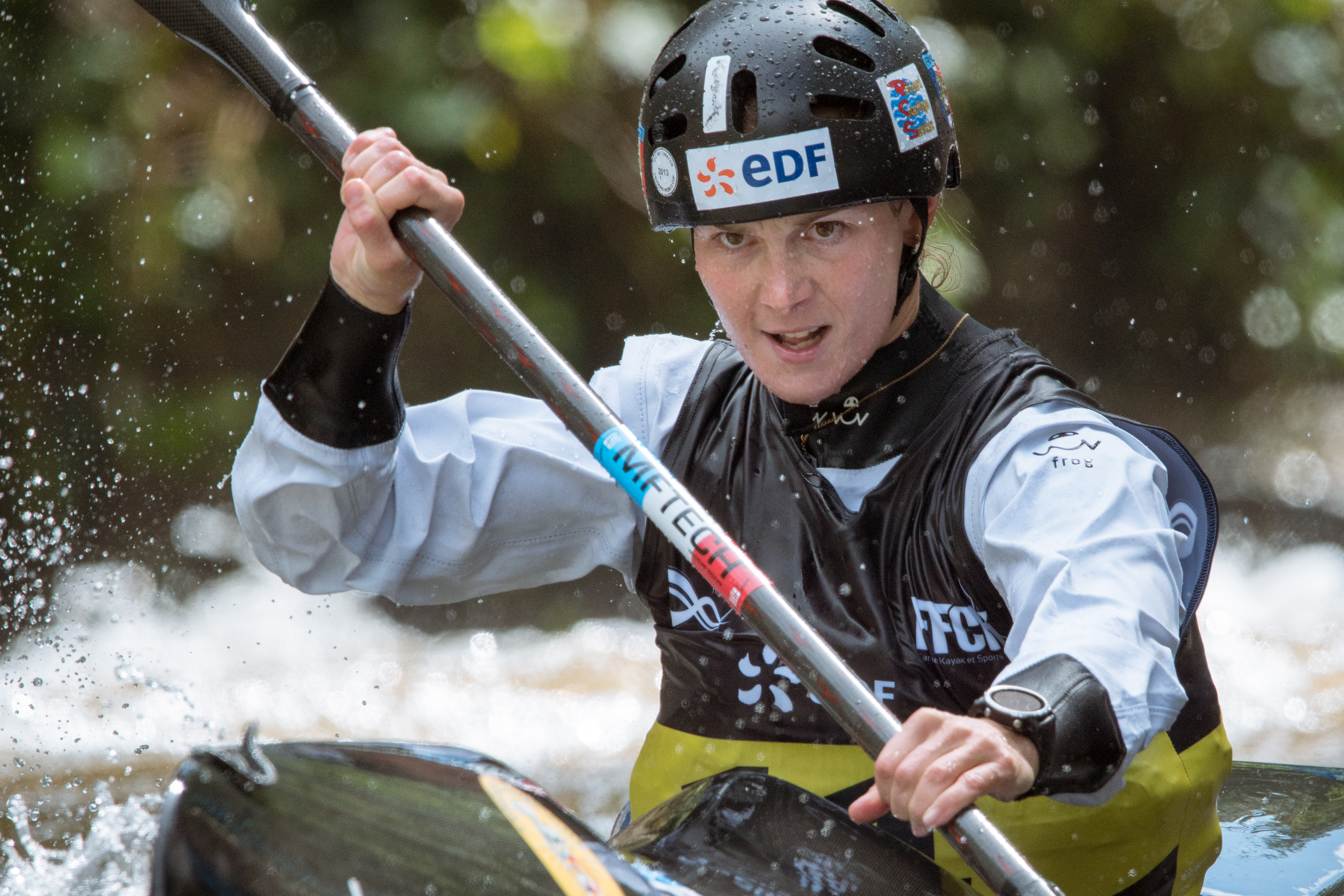

Personal information
- Born: 7 June 1994 (age 32) Roubaix, Nord, France
- Height: 1.69 m (5 ft 7 in)
- Weight: 62 kg (137 lb)

Sport
- Country: France
- Sport: Canoeing
- Events: Canoe sprint; Wildwater canoeing
Medal record
Wildwater canoeing
Event	1st	2nd	3rd
World Championships	7	6	2
European Championships	3	2	2
Total	10	8	4

Manon Hostens (born 7 June 1994) is a French canoeist who won 22 medals at senior level at the Wildwater Canoeing World Championships and European Wildwater Championships. She competed in the women's K-4 500 metres event at the 2016 Summer Olympics.

== Biography ==
Manon Hostens born in Roubaix in the north, has a 2 year old big brother: Quentin. Her parents both working, so she was very soon confronted with the community by a daycare center in Wasquehal. At the age of 2, the family moved to Chéreng in the Lille agglomeration where she began her education in a small country school, in parallel, she became acquainted for the first time with the aquatic environment through baby swimmers. and swimming lessons. This small nautical course enabled him to obtain his first swimming certificate of 25 m at 4 ½ years and his certificate of 400 m at 5 1/2 years.

== Medals at the World Championships ==
Of her 15 medals at the world championships, 5 were at individual level and 9 at team level.

Senior

Wildwater canoeing
Year	K1 classic individual			K1 classic team			K1 sprint individual			K1 sprint team		
Year	1st place, gold medalist(s)	2nd place, silver medalist(s)	3rd place, bronze medalist(s)	1st place, gold medalist(s)	2nd place, silver medalist(s)	3rd place, bronze medalist(s)	1st place, gold medalist(s)	2nd place, silver medalist(s)	3rd place, bronze medalist(s)	1st place, gold medalist(s)	2nd place, silver medalist(s)	3rd place, bronze medalist(s)
2013	0	0	0	0	0	0	0	0	0	1	0	0
2014	0	0	1	1	0	0	0	0	0	0	1	0
2015	0	0	0	0	0	0	0	0	0	1	0	0
2016	1	0	0	0	0	1	0	0	1	1	0	0
2017	0	0	0	0	0	0	0	1	0	1	0	0
2018	0	1	0	0	1	0	1	0	0	0	1	0
Tot.	1	1	1	1	1	1	1	1	1	4	2	0
