= Ana Roxana Lehaci =

Austrian canoeist (born 1990)

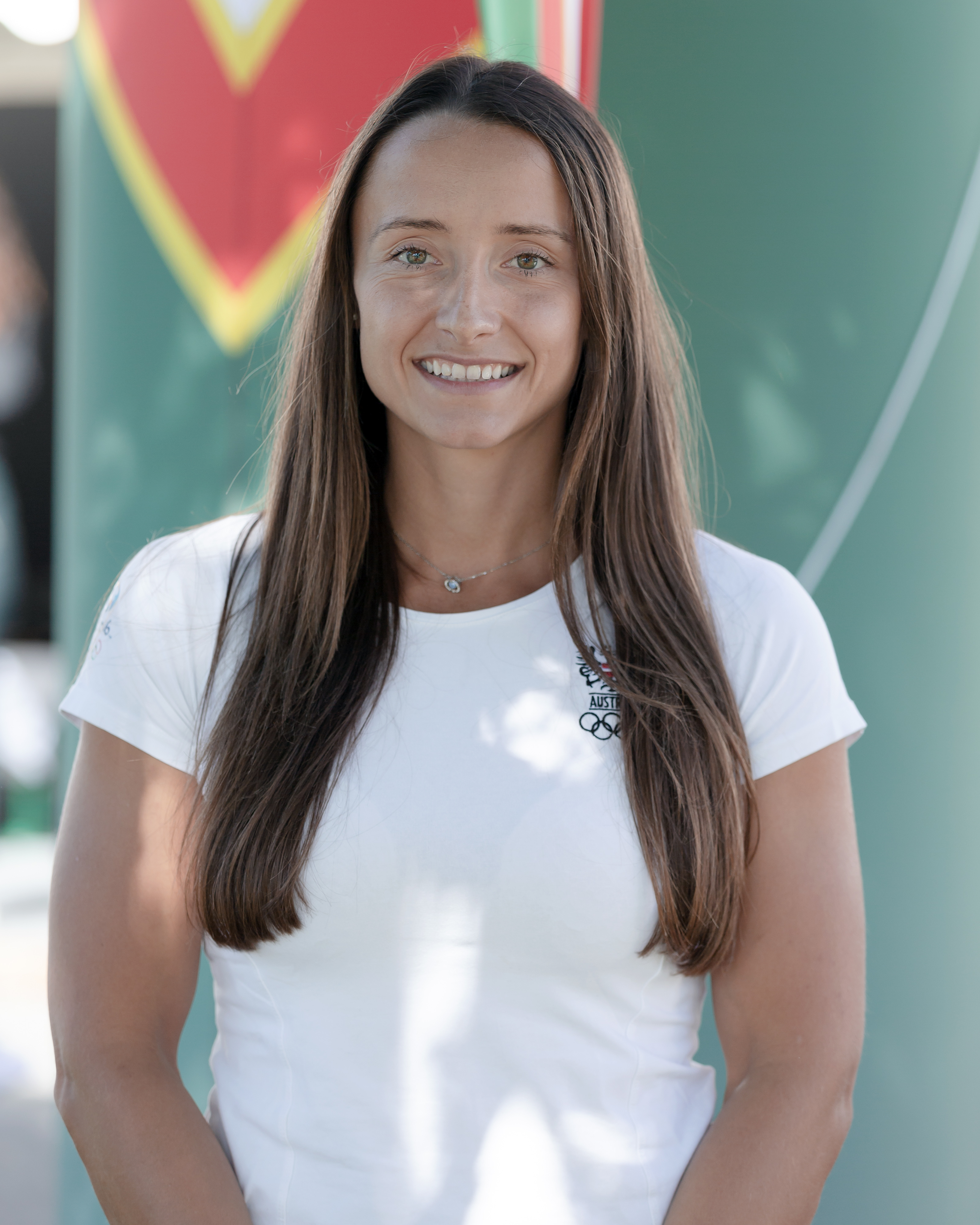
- Ana Roxana Lehaci Tag in 2019

Personal information
- Born: 11 August 1990 (age 35) Medgidia, Romania

Sport
- Sport: Canoe sprint

Ana Roxana Lehaci (Medgidia, 11 August 1990) is an Austrian canoeist. She competed in the women's K-2 500 metres event at the 2016 Summer Olympics.

== Personal life ==
Lehaci is the daughter of the Romanian canoeist Vasile Lehaci.
