= Kira Stepanova =

Russian canoeist (born 1993)

Personal information
- Full name: Kira Valeryevna Stepanova
- Nationality: Russian
- Born: Ки́ра Вале́рьевна Степа́нова; 12 November 1993 (age 32) Engels, Saratov Oblast, Russia
- Height: 1.83 m (6 ft 0 in)
- Weight: 81 kg (179 lb)

Sport
- Country: Russia
- Sport: Sprint kayak
- Club: Central Army Sports Club
Medal record
Women's sprint kayak
Representing Russia
World Championships
Bronze medal – third place	2021 Copenhagen	K-4 500 m
European Games
Bronze medal – third place	2019 Minsk	K-2 500 m
European Championships
Bronze medal – third place	2014 Brandenburg	K-4 500 m
Bronze medal – third place	2015 Račice	K-4 500 m
Bronze medal – third place	2018 Belgrade	K-4 500 m

Kira Valeryevna Stepanova (Russian: Кира Валерьевна Степанова; born 12 November 1993) is a Russian sprint canoeist. She competed in the women's K-2 500 metres event at the 2016 Summer Olympics.
