= 2018 ICF Canoe Sprint World Championships – Women's K-1 200 metres =

Women's K-1 200 metres at the 2018 ICF Canoe Sprint World Championships
- Venue: Centro de Alto Rendimento de Montemor-o-Velho
- Location: Montemor-o-Velho, Portugal
- Dates: 25–26 August
- Competitors: 29 from 29 nations
- Winning time: 38.821

Medalists
gold medal	Lisa Carrington	New Zealand
silver medal	Emma Jørgensen	Denmark
bronze medal	Linnea Stensils	Sweden

The women's K-1 200 metres competition at the 2018 ICF Canoe Sprint World Championships in Montemor-o-Velho took place at the Centro de Alto Rendimento de Montemor-o-Velho.

== Schedule ==
The schedule was as follows:

Date	Time	Round
Saturday 25 August 2018	15:35	Heats
Sunday 26 August 2018	10:30	Semifinals
Sunday 26 August 2018	11:55	Final B
Sunday 26 August 2018	12:11	Final A

All times are Western European Summer Time (UTC+1)

== Results ==
=== Heats ===
The six fastest boats in each heat, plus the three fastest remaining boats advanced to the semifinals.

==== Heat 1 ====
Rank	Kayaker	Country	Time	Notes
1	Lisa Carrington	New Zealand	41.825	QS
2	Dóra Lucz	Hungary	42.752	QS
3	Viktoria Schwarz	Austria	43.266	QS
4	Francesca Genzo	Italy	43.499	QS
5	Hermien Peters	Belgium	43.666	QS
6	Esti van Tonder	South Africa	43.749	QS
7	Márcia Aldeias	Portugal	45.036	qS
8	Madara Aldiņa	Latvia	45.209	qS

==== Heat 2 ====
Rank	Kayaker	Country	Time	Notes
1	Ivana Mládková	Slovakia	42.313	QS
2	Emma Jørgensen	Denmark	42.459	QS
3	Teresa Portela	Spain	42.926	QS
4	Catherine McArthur	Australia	44.383	QS
5	Marharyta Makhneva	Belarus	45.360	QS
6	Khaoula Sassi	Tunisia	46.716	QS
7	Anne Cairns	Samoa	49.827	

==== Heat 3 ====
Rank	Kayaker	Country	Time	Notes
1	Jessica Walker	Great Britain	42.244	QS
2	Marta Walczykiewicz	Poland	42.421	QS
3	Linnea Stensils	Sweden	42.634	QS
4	Anja Osterman	Slovenia	43.188	QS
5	Pauliina Polet	Finland	45.134	QS
6	Ysumy Orellana	Chile	45.481	QS
7	Lasma Liepa	Turkey	45.618	qS

==== Heat 4 ====
Rank	Kayaker	Country	Time	Notes
1	Sarah Guyot	France	42.449	QS
2	Elena Aniushina	Russia	43.156	QS
3	Anastasiia Todorova	Ukraine	43.239	QS
4	Biljana Relić	Serbia	43.419	QS
5	Jennifer Egan	Ireland	44.106	QS
6	Maria Lorena Manolica	Azerbaijan	45.026	QS
7	Asumi Ōmura	Japan	45.622	

=== Semifinals ===
Qualification in each semi was as follows:

The fastest three boats advanced to the A final.
The next three fastest boats advanced to the B final.

==== Semifinal 1 ====
Rank	Kayaker	Country	Time	Notes
1	Lisa Carrington	New Zealand	39.780	QA
2	Emma Jørgensen	Denmark	40.293	QA
3	Marta Walczykiewicz	Poland	40.633	QA
4	Anastasiia Todorova	Ukraine	41.023	QB
5	Hermien Peters	Belgium	41.533	QB
6	Biljana Relić	Serbia	41.550	QB
7	Márcia Aldeias	Portugal	43.153	
8	Pauliina Polet	Finland	43.590	
9	Khaoula Sassi	Tunisia	44.374	

==== Semifinal 2 ====
Rank	Kayaker	Country	Time	Notes
1	Ivana Mládková	Slovakia	40.292	QA
2	Linnea Stensils	Sweden	40.328	QA
3	Anja Osterman	Slovenia	40.385	QA
4	Elena Aniushina	Russia	40.905	QB
5	Viktoria Schwarz	Austria	40.982	QB
6	Maria Lorena Manolica	Azerbaijan	41.685	QB
7	Francesca Genzo	Italy	41.849	
8	Marharyta Makhneva	Belarus	42.112	
9	Madara Aldiņa	Latvia	42.835	

==== Semifinal 3 ====
Rank	Kayaker	Country	Time	Notes
1	Teresa Portela	Spain	40.010	QA
2	Sarah Guyot	France	40.133	QA
3	Jessica Walker	Great Britain	40.196	QA
4	Dóra Lucz	Hungary	40.733	QB
5	Esti van Tonder	South Africa	41.750	QB
6	Lasma Liepa	Turkey	41.993	QB
7	Catherine McArthur	Australia	42.247	
8	Jennifer Egan	Ireland	42.877	
9	Ysumy Orellana	Chile	44.250	

=== Finals ===
==== Final B ====
Competitors in this final raced for positions 10 to 18.

Rank	Kayaker	Country	Time
1	Anastasiia Todorova	Ukraine	41.234
2	Maria Lorena Manolica	Azerbaijan	41.601
3	Elena Aniushina	Russia	41.711
4	Biljana Relić	Serbia	41.728
5	Dóra Lucz	Hungary	41.774
6	Viktoria Schwarz	Austria	42.028
7	Hermien Peters	Belgium	42.668
8	Lasma Liepa	Turkey	43.078
9	Esti van Tonder	South Africa	43.571

==== Final A ====
Competitors in this final raced for positions 1 to 9, with medals going to the top three.

Rank	Kayaker	Country	Time
1st place, gold medalist(s)	Lisa Carrington	New Zealand	38.821
2nd place, silver medalist(s)	Emma Jørgensen	Denmark	40.548
3rd place, bronze medalist(s)	Linnea Stensils	Sweden	40.585
4	Marta Walczykiewicz	Poland	40.685
5	Jessica Walker	Great Britain	40.728
6	Ivana Mládková	Slovakia	40.745
7	Sarah Guyot	France	40.795
8	Teresa Portela	Spain	40.978
9	Anja Osterman	Slovenia	41.155
