= 2019 ICF Canoe Sprint World Championships – Women's K-1 200 metres =

Women's K-1 200 metres at the 2019 ICF Canoe Sprint World Championships
- Venue: Olympic Centre of Szeged
- Location: Szeged, Hungary
- Dates: 21–24 August
- Competitors: 42 from 42 nations
- Winning time: 39.39

Medalists
gold medal	Lisa Carrington	New Zealand
silver medal	Marta Walczykiewicz	Poland
bronze medal	Emma Jørgensen	Denmark
bronze medal	Teresa Portela	Spain

The women's K-1 200 metres competition at the 2019 ICF Canoe Sprint World Championships in Szeged took place at the Olympic Centre of Szeged.

== Schedule ==
The schedule was as follows:

Date	Time	Round
Wednesday 21 August 2019	17:10	Heats
Friday 23 August 2019	16:18	Semifinals
Saturday 24 August 2019	09:00	Final C
Saturday 24 August 2019	09:05	Final B
Saturday 24 August 2019	11:33	Final A

All times are Central European Summer Time (UTC+2)

== Results ==
=== Heats ===
The five fastest boats in each heat, plus the two fastest sixth-place boats advanced to the semifinals.

==== Heat 1 ====
Rank	Kayaker	Country	Time	Notes
1	Milica Starović	Serbia	39.75	QS
2	Emma Jørgensen	Denmark	39.85	QS
3	Inna Klinova	Kazakhstan	40.14	QS
4	Francesca Genzo	Italy	41.04	QS
5	Sabrina Ameghino	Argentina	41.17	QS
6	Iuliana Ţăran	Romania	41.57	qS
7	Madara Aldiņa	Latvia	42.11	
8	Stevani Maysche Ibo	Indonesia	42.33	
9	Elnaz Shafieian Noveir	Iran	42.92	

==== Heat 2 ====
Rank	Kayaker	Country	Time	Notes
1	Linnea Stensils	Sweden	39.21	QS
2	Yin Mengdie	China	39.30	QS
3	Michelle Russell	Canada	39.91	QS
4	Jennifer Egan	Ireland	40.64	QS
5	Maria Lorena Manolica	Azerbaijan	41.49	QS
6	Franziska Widmer	Switzerland	41.68	qS
7	Kaitlyn McElroy	United States	43.12	
8	Amira Kheris	Algeria	46.45	

==== Heat 3 ====
Rank	Kayaker	Country	Time	Notes
1	Lisa Carrington	New Zealand	38.53	QS
2	Dóra Lucz	Hungary	39.38	QS
3	Jessica Walker	Great Britain	39.49	QS
4	Teresa Portela	Portugal	39.72	QS
5	Lasma Liepa	Turkey	41.59	QS
6	Ysumy Orellana	Chile	42.50	
7	Chen Hsin-shuang	Chinese Taipei	43.48	
8	Stefanie Perdomo	Ecuador	43.53	
9	Anne Cairns	Samoa	44.77	

==== Heat 4 ====
Rank	Kayaker	Country	Time	Notes
1	Mariia Kichasova-Skoryk	Ukraine	39.45	QS
2	Sarah Guyot	France	39.55	QS
3	Ivana Mládková	Slovakia	39.72	QS
4	Marharyta Makhneva	Belarus	40.04	QS
5	Kim Guk-joo	South Korea	40.83	QS
6	Anamaria Govorčinović	Croatia	41.92	
7	Netta Malkinson	Israel	41.98	
8	Melanie Waite	Malta	51.12	

==== Heat 5 ====
Rank	Kayaker	Country	Time	Notes
1	Marta Walczykiewicz	Poland	39.20	QS
2	Teresa Portela	Spain	39.22	QS
3	Natalia Podolskaya	Russia	39.86	QS
4	Alyce Burnett	Australia	40.01	QS
5	Esti van Tonder	South Africa	40.91	QS
6	Sze Ying Soh	Singapore	42.59	
7	Jitta van der Laan	Netherlands	43.68	
8	Samaa Ahmed	Egypt	46.35	

=== Semifinals ===
Qualification in each semi was as follows:

The fastest three boats advanced to the A final.
The next three fastest boats advanced to the B final.
The seventh, eighth and ninth-place boats advanced to the C final.

==== Semifinal 1 ====
Rank	Kayaker	Country	Time	Notes
1	Teresa Portela	Spain	39.23	QA
2	Mariia Kichasova-Skoryk	Ukraine	39.81	QA
3	Milica Starović	Serbia	39.83	QA
4	Yin Mengdie	China	39.88	QB
5	Jessica Walker	Great Britain	40.02	QB
6	Francesca Genzo	Italy	40.64	QB
7	Marharyta Makhneva	Belarus	40.77	QC
8	Esti van Tonder	South Africa	40.81	QC
9	Maria Lorena Manolica	Azerbaijan	41.09	QC

==== Semifinal 2 ====
Rank	Kayaker	Country	Time	Notes
1	Lisa Carrington	New Zealand	38.81	QA
2	Teresa Portela	Portugal	39.31	QA
3	Emma Jørgensen	Denmark	39.56	QA
4	Sarah Guyot	France	39.90	QB
5	Michelle Russell	Canada	40.27	QB
6	Natalia Podolskaya	Russia	40.32	QB
7	Kim Guk-joo	South Korea	41.60	QC
8	Sabrina Ameghino	Argentina	42.15	QC
9	Iuliana Ţăran	Romania	42.24	QC

==== Semifinal 3 ====
Rank	Kayaker	Country	Time	Notes
1	Marta Walczykiewicz	Poland	39.14	QA
2	Dóra Lucz	Hungary	39.75	QA
3	Inna Klinova	Kazakhstan	40.01	QA
4	Linnea Stensils	Sweden	40.02	QB
5	Ivana Mládková	Slovakia	40.32	QB
6	Alyce Burnett	Australia	40.40	QB
7	Lasma Liepa	Turkey	40.92	QC
8	Jennifer Egan	Ireland	41.03	QC
9	Franziska Widmer	Switzerland	43.01	QC

=== Finals ===
==== Final C ====
Competitors in this final raced for positions 19 to 27.

Rank	Kayaker	Country	Time
1	Marharyta Makhneva	Belarus	41.95
2	Esti van Tonder	South Africa	42.76
3	Lasma Liepa	Turkey	42.83
4	Kim Guk-joo	South Korea	43.40
5	Sabrina Ameghino	Argentina	43.43
6	Jennifer Egan	Ireland	43.49
7	Franziska Widmer	Switzerland	43.94
8	Maria Lorena Manolica	Azerbaijan	44.32
9	Iuliana Ţăran	Romania	44.35

==== Final B ====
Competitors in this final raced for positions 10 to 18.

Rank	Kayaker	Country	Time
1	Linnea Stensils	Sweden	41.08
2	Yin Mengdie	China	41.09
3	Jessica Walker	Great Britain	41.10
4	Natalia Podolskaya	Russia	41.32
5	Alyce Burnett	Australia	41.96
6	Ivana Mládková	Slovakia	42.06
7	Michelle Russell	Canada	42.20
8	Sarah Guyot	France	42.63
9	Francesca Genzo	Italy	42.91

==== Final A ====
Competitors in this final raced for positions 1 to 9, with medals going to the top four as two boats were tied for third place.

Rank	Kayaker	Country	Time
1st place, gold medalist(s)	Lisa Carrington	New Zealand	39.39
2nd place, silver medalist(s)	Marta Walczykiewicz	Poland	41.33
3rd place, bronze medalist(s)	Emma Jørgensen	Denmark	41.34
3rd place, bronze medalist(s)	Teresa Portela	Spain	41.34
5	Mariia Kichasova-Skoryk	Ukraine	41.46
6	Dóra Lucz	Hungary	41.65
7	Milica Starović	Serbia	41.91
8	Teresa Portela	Portugal	42.25
9	Inna Klinova	Kazakhstan	42.67
