= 2018 ICF Canoe Sprint World Championships – Women's K-1 500 metres =

Women's K-1 500 metres at the 2018 ICF Canoe Sprint World Championships
- Venue: Centro de Alto Rendimento de Montemor-o-Velho
- Location: Montemor-o-Velho, Portugal
- Dates: 23–25 August 2018
- Competitors: 32 from 32 nations
- Winning time: 1:47.254

Medalists
gold medal	Danuta Kozák	Hungary
silver medal	Lisa Carrington	New Zealand
bronze medal	Volha Khudzenka	Belarus

The women's K-1 500 metres competition at the 2018 ICF Canoe Sprint World Championships in Montemor-o-Velho took place at the Centro de Alto Rendimento de Montemor-o-Velho.

== Schedule ==
The schedule was as follows:

Date	Time	Round
Thursday 23 August 2018	10:35	Heats
Friday 24 August 2018	17:47	Semifinals
Saturday 25 August 2018	11:32	Final B
Saturday 25 August 2018	12:03	Final A

All times are Western European Summer Time (UTC+1)

== Results ==
=== Heats ===
The six fastest boats in each heat, plus the three fastest remaining boats advanced to the semifinals.

==== Heat 1 ====
Rank	Kayaker	Country	Time	Notes
1	Volha Khudzenka	Belarus	1:51.294	QS
2	Alyce Burnett	Australia	1:53.814	QS
3	Ivana Mládková	Slovakia	1:55.524	QS
4	Cristina Petracca	Italy	1:56.779	QS
5	Léa Jamelot	France	1:56.969	QS
6	Carla Frieiro	Spain	1:58.594	QS
7	Sofie Kinclová	Czech Republic	1:59.859	qS
8	Khaoula Sassi	Tunisia	2:05.390	
–	Amira Kheris	Algeria	DNS	

==== Heat 2 ====
Rank	Kayaker	Country	Time	Notes
1	Lisa Carrington	New Zealand	1:53.239	QS
2	Linnea Stensils	Sweden	1:54.169	QS
3	Anja Osterman	Slovenia	1:55.404	QS
4	María Garro	Argentina	2:00.129	QS
5	Ana Paula Vergutz	Brazil	2:00.864	QS
6	Pauliina Polet	Finland	2:01.089	QS
7	Maria Rei	Portugal	2:02.075	qS
8	Jitta van der Laan	Netherlands	2:02.115	
9	Franziska Widmer	Switzerland	2:02.165	

==== Heat 3 ====
Rank	Kayaker	Country	Time	Notes
1	Anna Puławska	Poland	1:52.764	QS
2	Milica Starović	Serbia	1:53.234	QS
3	Emma Jørgensen	Denmark	1:54.124	QS
4	Michelle Russell	Canada	1:54.364	QS
5	Esti van Tonder	South Africa	1:57.279	QS
6	Jennifer Egan	Ireland	1:58.514	QS
7	Asumi Ōmura	Japan	1:59.619	qS
8	Ysumy Orellana	Chile	2:02.309	

==== Heat 4 ====
Rank	Kayaker	Country	Time	Notes
1	Danuta Kozák	Hungary	1:51.529	QS
2	Elena Aniushina	Russia	1:52.919	QS
3	Rebeka Simon	Great Britain	1:55.059	QS
4	Nina Krankemann	Germany	1:55.394	QS
5	Madara Aldiņa	Latvia	1:58.579	QS
6	Anne Cairns	Samoa	2:05.060	QS

=== Semifinals ===
Qualification in each semi was as follows:

The fastest three boats advanced to the A final.
The next three fastest boats advanced to the B final.

==== Semifinal 1 ====
Rank	Kayaker	Country	Time	Notes
1	Lisa Carrington	New Zealand	1:49.484	QA
2	Volha Khudzenka	Belarus	1:50.414	QA
3	Alyce Burnett	Australia	1:51.134	QA
4	Emma Jørgensen	Denmark	1:52.241	QB
5	Michelle Russell	Canada	1:53.088	QB
6	Pauliina Polet	Finland	1:56.224	QB
7	Carla Frieiro	Spain	1:57.738	
8	Madara Aldiņa	Latvia	1:58.164	
9	Asumi Ōmura	Japan	1:58.851	

==== Semifinal 2 ====
Rank	Kayaker	Country	Time	Notes
1	Anna Puławska	Poland	1:51.859	QA
2	Elena Aniushina	Russia	1:52.853	QA
3	Ivana Mládková	Slovakia	1:53.366	QA
4	Anja Osterman	Slovenia	1:53.409	QB
5	Nina Krankemann	Germany	1:57.009	QB
6	Sofie Kinclová	Czech Republic	1:58.173	QB
7	Léa Jamelot	France	1:58.176	
8	María Garro	Argentina	1:58.190	
9	Jennifer Egan	Ireland	2:00.650	

==== Semifinal 3 ====
Rank	Kayaker	Country	Time	Notes
1	Volha Khudzenka	Belarus	1:50.742	QA
2	Milica Starović	Serbia	1:51.835	QA
3	Linnea Stensils	Sweden	1:51.948	QA
4	Rebeka Simon	Great Britain	1:54.382	QB
5	Esti van Tonder	South Africa	1:55.685	QB
6	Cristina Petracca	Italy	1:56.672	QB
7	Ana Paula Vergutz	Brazil	1:58.059	
8	Maria Rei	Portugal	1:58.649	
9	Anne Cairns	Samoa	2:06.802	

=== Finals ===
==== Final B ====
Competitors in this final raced for positions 10 to 18.

Rank	Kayaker	Country	Time
1	Emma Jørgensen	Denmark	1:51.072
2	Anja Osterman	Slovenia	1:51.682
3	Michelle Russell	Canada	1:52.657
4	Rebeka Simon	Great Britain	1:53.737
5	Esti van Tonder	South Africa	1:54.272
6	Nina Krankemann	Germany	1:55.002
7	Cristina Petracca	Italy	1:55.082
8	Sofie Kinclová	Czech Republic	1:57.802
9	Pauliina Polet	Finland	1:58.842

==== Final A ====
Competitors in this final raced for positions 1 to 9, with medals going to the top three.

Rank	Kayaker	Country	Time
1st place, gold medalist(s)	Danuta Kozák	Hungary	1:47.254
2nd place, silver medalist(s)	Lisa Carrington	New Zealand	1:47.984
3rd place, bronze medalist(s)	Volha Khudzenka	Belarus	1:48.724
4	Anna Puławska	Poland	1:49.614
5	Elena Aniushina	Russia	1:50.759
6	Linnea Stensils	Sweden	1:51.034
7	Alyce Burnett	Australia	1:51.919
8	Milica Starović	Serbia	1:52.199
9	Ivana Mládková	Slovakia	1:52.244
