= Canoeing at the 2018 Mediterranean Games – Women's K-1 200 metres =

Women's canoe sprint K-1 200 metres at the 2018 Mediterranean Games
- Venue: Canal Olímpic de Catalunya
- Date: 23–24 June 2018
- Competitors: 11 from 11 nations
- Winning time: 40.140

Medalists
gold medal	Teresa Portela Rivas	Spain
silver medal	Sarah Guyot	France
bronze medal	Teresa Portela	Portugal

The women's canoe sprint K-1 200 metres at the 2018 Mediterranean Games in Tarragona took place between 23 and 24 June at the Canal Olímpic de Catalunya.

== Schedule ==
All times are Spain time (UTC+02:00)

Date	Time	Round
Saturday, 23 June 2018	09:50; 12:30	Heats; Semifinal
Sunday, 24 June 2018	10:40	Final

== Results ==
=== Heats ===
==== Heat 1 ====
Rank	Canoer	Country	Time	Notes
1	Teresa Portela Rivas	Spain	40.941	QF
2	Milica Starović	Serbia	41.638	QF
3	Francesca Genzo	Italy	41.921	QF
4	Anamaria Govorčinović	Croatia	47.458	QS
5	Anja Osterman	Slovenia	51.136	QS
6	Anfel Arabi	Algeria	56.874	QS

==== Heat 2 ====
Rank	Canoer	Country	Time	Notes
1	Sarah Guyot	France	40.867	QF
2	Teresa Portela	Portugal	41.221	QF
3	Lasma Liepa	Turkey	42.433	QF
4	Khaoula Sassi	Tunisia	45.305	QS
5	Markela Nina Kavoura	Greece	46.773	QS

=== Semifinal ===
Rank	Canoer	Country	Time	Notes
1	Anja Osterman	Slovenia	40.056	QF
2	Anamaria Govorčinović	Croatia	43.620	QF
3	Khaoula Sassi	Tunisia	44.687	QF
4	Markela Nina Kavoura	Greece	45.886	
5	Anfel Arabi	Algeria	54.008	

=== Final ===
Rank	Canoer	Country	Time
1st place, gold medalist(s)	Teresa Portela Rivas	Spain (ESP)	40.140
2nd place, silver medalist(s)	Sarah Guyot	France (FRA)	40.249
3rd place, bronze medalist(s)	Teresa Portela	Portugal (POR)	40.504
4	Milica Starović	Serbia (SRB)	40.912
5	Anja Osterman	Slovenia (SLO)	41.120
6	Francesca Genzo	Italy (ITA)	41.699
7	Lasma Liepa	Turkey (TUR)	41.869
8	Khaoula Sassi	Tunisia (TUN)	44.245
9	Anamaria Govorčinović	Croatia (CRO)	44.777

QF=Qualified for final, QS=Qualified for semifinal
