= Canoeing at the 2020 Summer Olympics – Women's K-1 500 metres =

Women's K-1 500 metres at the Games of the XXXII Olympiad
- Canoeing pictogram
- Venue: Sea Forest Waterway
- Dates: 4 August 2021 (heats and quarterfinal); 5 August 2021 (semifinal & final)
- Competitors: 41 from 27 nations
- Winning time: 1:51.216

Medalists
1st place, gold medalist(s)		Lisa Carrington	New Zealand
2nd place, silver medalist(s)		Tamara Csipes	Hungary
3rd place, bronze medalist(s)		Emma Jørgensen	Denmark

The women's K-1 500 metres sprint canoeing event at the 2020 Summer Olympics took place on 4 and 5 August 2021 at the Sea Forest Waterway. At least 13 canoeists from at least 13 nations competed.

== Background ==
This was the 19th appearance of the event, the only event to have appeared every Summer Games since the introduction of women's canoeing in 1948.

The reigning World Champion (who also won the 2015 World Championship and the bronze medal at the 2016 Games) is Lisa Carrington of New Zealand, who earned a place for her NOC and has been selected to compete. The reigning Olympic champion is Danuta Kozák of Hungary, who finished third at the World Championships to earn Hungary a quota place.

== Qualification ==
A National Olympic Committee (NOC) could qualify one place in the event, though could enter up to 2 boats if it earned enough quota places through other women's kayak events. A total of 13 qualification places were available, initially allocated as follows:

- 1 place for the host nation, provided it qualified no other women's kayak places
- 5 places awarded through the 2019 ICF Canoe Sprint World Championships
- 6 places awarded through continental tournaments, 1 per continent except 2 places for Europe
- 1 place awarded through the 2021 Canoe Sprint World Cup Stage 2.

Qualifying places were awarded to the NOC, not to the individual canoeist who earned the place.

Japan earned a women's kayak place in the K-1 200 metres, so that quota place was added to the World Championships (making 6). Carrington's and Khudzenka's quota places went through the reallocation process because they also qualified in K-4 boats. That process resulted in an additional place in K-1 500 metres, which went to Simon. The World Championships quota places were allocated as follows:

Rank	Kayaker	Nation	Qualification	Selected competitor
1	Lisa Carrington	New Zealand	Earned quota in K-4 500 m	Could enter via K-1 500, K-2, or K-4
2	Volha Khudzenka	Belarus	Earned quota in K-4 500 m	Could enter via K-1 500, K-2, or K-4
3	Danuta Kozák	Hungary	Quota #1 in K-1 500 m	
4	Milica Starović	Serbia	Quota #2 in K-1 500 m	
5	Emma Jørgensen	Denmark	Quota #3 in K-1 500 m	
6	Linnea Stensils	Sweden	Quota #4 in K-1 500 m	
7	Rebeka Simon	Great Britain	Reallocated quota place	

Continental and World Cup places:

Nation	Qualification	Selected competitors
Egypt	Africa quota in K-1 500 m	
Canada	Americas quota in K-1 500 m	
Kazakhstan	Asia quota in K-1 500 m	
Spain	Europe quota #1 in K-1 500 m	Teresa Portela
Croatia	Europe quota #2 in K-1 500 m	
Samoa	Oceania quota in K-1 500 m	
Portugal	World Cup quota in K-1 500 m	

Nations with women's kayak quota spots from the K-1 200 metres, K-2 500 metres, or K-4 500 metres could enter (additional) boats as well.

Nation	Selected competitor 1	Selected competitor 2
New Zealand	Lisa Carrington (K-4)	Caitlin Regal (K-4)

== Competition format ==
Sprint canoeing uses a four-round format for events with at least 11 boats, with heats, quarterfinals, semifinals, and finals. The specifics of the progression format depend on the number of boats ultimately entered.

The course is a flatwater course 9 metres wide. The name of the event describes the particular format within sprint canoeing. The "K" format means a kayak, with the canoeist sitting, using a double-bladed paddle to paddle, and steering with a foot-operated rudder (as opposed to a canoe, with a kneeling canoeist, single-bladed paddle, and no rudder). The "1" is the number of canoeists in each boat. The "500 metres" is the distance of each race.

== Schedule ==
The event was held over two consecutive days, with two rounds per day. All sessions started at 9:30 a.m. local time, though there are multiple events with races in each session.

Legend
H	Heats	¼	Quarter-finals	½	Semi-finals	F	Final

Sprint
Event↓/Date →	Mon 2	Tue 3	Wed 4		Thu 5		Fri 6	Sat 7
Women's K-1 500 m			H	¼	½	F		

== Results ==
=== Heats ===
The first three canoers from each heat advance to the semifinals. The remaining competitors compete in the quarterfinals.

==== Heat 1 ====
Rank	Lane	Canoer	Country	Time	Notes
1	3	Hermien Peters	Belgium	1:47.959	SF
2	2	Teresa Portela	Portugal	1:48.727	SF
3	1	Jule Hake	Germany	1:48.758	SF
4	4	Isabel Contreras	Spain	1:49.256	QF
5	5	Milica Novaković	Serbia	1:49.802	QF
6	6	Yin Mengdie	China	1:52.760	QF
7	7	Emily Lewis	Great Britain	1:55.743	QF

==== Heat 2 ====
Rank	Lane	Canoer	Country	Time	Notes
1	1	Anja Osterman	Slovenia	1:49.402	SF
2	3	Justyna Iskrzycka	Poland	1:49.893	SF
3	5	Volha Khudzenka	Belarus	1:50.732	SF
4	4	Brenda Rojas	Argentina	1:54.541	QF
5	7	Yuliia Yuriichuk	Ukraine	1:57.532	QF
6	6	Francesca Genzo	Italy	1:59.712	QF
7	2	Natalya Sergeyeva	Kazakhstan	2:01.374	QF

==== Heat 3 ====
Rank	Lane	Canoer	Country	Time	Notes
1	5	Linnea Stensils	Sweden	1:48.144	SF
2	2	Alyce Wood	Australia	1:48.572	SF
3	1	Caitlin Regal	New Zealand	1:50.297	SF
4	7	Špela Ponomarenko Janić	Slovenia	1:50.498	QF
5	4	Svetlana Chernigovskaya	ROC	1:52.311	QF
6	3	Manon Hostens	France	1:53.668	QF
7	6	Amira Kheris	Algeria	2:13.626	QF

==== Heat 4 ====
Rank	Lane	Canoer	Country	Time	Notes
1	4	Danuta Kozák	Hungary	1:48.730	SF
2	5	Emma Jørgensen	Denmark	1:49.231	SF
3	7	Alyssa Bull	Australia	1:49.416	SF
4	2	Michelle Russell	Canada	1:51.081	QF
5	3	Deborah Kerr	Great Britain	1:51.375	QF
6	1	Ana Roxana Lehaci	Austria	1:55.067	QF
7	6	Samaa Ahmed	Egypt	2:13.007	QF

==== Heat 5 ====
Rank	Lane	Canoer	Country	Time	Notes
1	2	Tamara Csipes	Hungary	1:48.790	SF
2	6	Maryna Litvinchuk	Belarus	1:49.606	SF
3	1	Marta Walczykiewicz	Poland	1:50.184	SF
4	4	Mariya Povkh	Ukraine	1:50.489	QF
5	5	Anamaria Govorčinović	Croatia	1:52.015	QF
6	7	Huang Jieyi	China	1:52.385	QF
7	3	Lize Broekx	Belgium	1:52.476	QF

==== Heat 6 ====
Rank	Lane	Canoer	Country	Time	Notes
1	4	Lisa Carrington	New Zealand	1:48.463	SF
2	2	Sabrina Hering-Pradler	Germany	1:49.932	SF
3	3	Viktoria Schwarz	Austria	1:51.750	SF
4	6	Kira Stepanova	ROC	1:55.180	QF
5	5	Joana Vasconcelos	Portugal	1:57.513	QF
6	1	Anne Cairns	Samoa	2:03.667	QF

=== Quarterfinals ===
Progression: 1st-3rd to SF, rest out.

==== Quarterfinal 1 ====
Rank	Lane	Canoer	Country	Time	Notes
1	4	Isabel Contreras	Spain	1:51.235	SF
2	3	Manon Hostens	France	1:54.095	SF
3	5	Yuliia Yuriichuk	Ukraine	1:58.657	SF
4	6	Anne Cairns	Samoa	2:02.525	
5	7	Samaa Ahmed	Egypt	2:06.033	

==== Quarterfinal 2 ====
Rank	Lane	Canoer	Country	Time	Notes
1	5	Svetlana Chernigovskaya	ROC	1:49.323	SF
2	7	Lize Broekx	Belgium	1:49.336	SF
3	4	Brenda Rojas	Argentina	1:51.822	SF
4	2	Emily Lewis	Great Britain	1:51.996	
5	6	Ana Roxana Lehaci	Austria	1:53.378	
6	3	Joana Vasconcelos	Portugal	1:56.622	

==== Quarterfinal 3 ====
Rank	Lane	Canoer	Country	Time	Notes
1	6	Yin Mengdie	China	1:49.268	SF
2	4	Špela Ponomarenko Janić	Slovenia	1:49.680	SF
3	3	Deborah Kerr	Great Britain	1:50.133	SF
4	5	Kira Stepanova	ROC	1:52.190	
5	2	Huang Jieyi	China	1:52.689	
6	7	Natalya Sergeyeva	Kazakhstan	1:55.776	

==== Quarterfinal 4 ====
Rank	Lane	Canoer	Country	Time	Notes
1	3	Milica Novaković	Serbia	1:49.348	SF
2	5	Mariya Povkh	Ukraine	1:50.769	SF
3	4	Michelle Russell	Canada	1:51.375	SF
4	6	Anamaria Govorčinović	Croatia	1:53.967	
5	2	Francesca Genzo	Italy	2:01.744	
6	7	Amira Kheris	Algeria	2:07.548	

=== Semifinals ===
Progression System: 1st-2nd to Final A, 3rd-4th to Final B, 5th-6th to Final C, rest out.

==== Semifinal 1 ====
Rank	Lane	Canoer	Country	Time	Notes
1	4	Tamara Csipes	Hungary	1:51.698	FA
2	6	Hermien Peters	Belgium	1:52.829	FA
3	5	Caitlin Regal	New Zealand	1:53.495	FB
4	3	Justyna Iskrzycka	Poland	1:53.899	FB
5	7	Lize Broekx	Belgium	1:54.489	FC
6	2	Isabel Contreras	Spain	1:54.535	FC
7	1	Deborah Kerr	Great Britain	1:55.955	

==== Semifinal 2 ====
Rank	Lane	Canoer	Country	Time	Notes
1	4	Danuta Kozák	Hungary	1:52.016	FA
2	3	Teresa Portela	Portugal	1:52.557	FA
3	6	Volha Khudzenka	Belarus	1:52.755	FB
4	1	Mariya Povkh	Ukraine	1:53.659	FB
5	5	Maryna Litvinchuk	Belarus	1:56.386	FC
6	2	Viktoria Schwarz	Austria	1:56.475	FC
7	7	Yin Mengdie	China	1:56.977	
8	8	Yuliia Yuriichuk	Ukraine	2:03.303	

==== Semifinal 3 ====
Rank	Lane	Canoer	Country	Time	Notes
1	4	Linnea Stensils	Sweden	1:51.902	FA
2	3	Emma Jørgensen	Denmark	1:52.931	FA
3	6	Marta Walczykiewicz	Poland	1:53.860	FB
4	5	Sabrina Hering-Pradler	Germany	1:54.140	FB
5	2	Jule Hake	Germany	1:54.341	FC
6	1	Špela Ponomarenko Janić	Slovenia	1:54.710	FC
7	8	Michelle Russell	Canada	1:55.549	
8	7	Svetlana Chernigovskaya	ROC	1:56.066	

==== Semifinal 4 ====
Rank	Lane	Canoer	Country	Time	Notes
1	5	Lisa Carrington	New Zealand	1:51.680	FA
2	3	Alyce Wood	Australia	1:53.079	FA
3	2	Milica Novaković	Serbia	1:53.149	FB
4	6	Alyssa Bull	Australia	1:54.038	FB
5	4	Anja Osterman	Slovenia	1:54.235	FC
6	7	Manon Hostens	France	1:57.394	FC
7	1	Brenda Rojas	Argentina	1:58.301	

=== Finals ===
==== Final A ====
Rank	Lane	Canoer	Country	Time	Notes
1st place, gold medalist(s)	3	Lisa Carrington	New Zealand	1:51.216	
2nd place, silver medalist(s)	5	Tamara Csipes	Hungary	1:51.855	
3rd place, bronze medalist(s)	1	Emma Jørgensen	Denmark	1:52.773	
4	6	Danuta Kozák	Hungary	1:53.414	
5	4	Linnea Stensils	Sweden	1:53.600	
6	2	Hermien Peters	Belgium	1:53.716	
7	7	Teresa Portela	Portugal	1:55.814	
8	8	Alyce Wood	Australia	1:57.251	

==== Final B ====
Rank	Lane	Canoer	Country	Time	Notes
9	5	Caitlin Regal	New Zealand	1:53.681	
10	1	Sabrina Hering-Pradler	Germany	1:53.919	
11	2	Justyna Iskrzycka	Poland	1:54.086	
12	3	Milica Novaković	Serbia	1:54.458	
13	4	Marta Walczykiewicz	Poland	1:55.659	
14	6	Volha Khudzenka	Belarus	1:55.933	
15	7	Mariya Povkh	Ukraine	1:56.429	
16	8	Alyssa Bull	Australia	1:56.799	

==== Final C ====
Rank	Lane	Canoer	Country	Time	Notes
17	3	Anja Osterman	Slovenia	1:55.051	
18	4	Jule Hake	Germany	1:55.638	
19	2	Isabel Contreras	Spain	1:55.728	
20	1	Špela Ponomarenko Janić	Slovenia	1:56.066	
21	5	Lize Broekx	Belgium	1:56.842	
22	6	Maryna Litvinchuk	Belarus	1:57.057	
23	8	Manon Hostens	France	1:58.133	
24	7	Viktoria Schwarz	Austria	1:59.475	
