= Canoeing at the 2020 Summer Olympics – Women's K-1 200 metres =

Olympic canoeing event

Women's K-1 200 metres at the Games of the XXXII Olympiad
- Canoeing pictogram
- Venue: Sea Forest Waterway
- Dates: 2 August 2021 (heats and quarterfinal); 3 August 2021 (semifinal & final)
- Competitors: 34 from 24 nations
- Winning time: 38.120

Medalists
1st place, gold medalist(s)		Lisa Carrington	New Zealand
2nd place, silver medalist(s)		Teresa Portela	Spain
3rd place, bronze medalist(s)		Emma Jørgensen	Denmark

The women's K-1 200 metres sprint canoeing event at the 2020 Summer Olympics took place on 2 and 3 August 2021 at the Sea Forest Waterway. At least 12 canoeists from at least 12 nations competed.

== Background ==
This was the 3rd appearance of the event, which replaced the men's C-2 500 metres in 2012.

The seven-time reigning World Champion and two-time reigning Olympic champion is Lisa Carrington of New Zealand, who earned a place for her NOC and has been selected to compete.

== Qualification ==
A National Olympic Committee (NOC) could qualify one place in the event, though could enter up to 2 boats if it earned enough quota places through other women's kayak events. A total of 12 qualification places were available, initially allocated as follows:

- 5 places awarded through the 2019 ICF Canoe Sprint World Championships
- 6 places awarded through continental tournaments, 1 per continent except 2 places for Europe
- 1 place awarded through the 2021 Canoe Sprint World Cup Stage 2.

Qualifying places were awarded to the NOC, not to the individual canoeist who earned the place.

An extensive reallocation process was used, resulting in one of the quota places being reallocated to a larger kayak class. Carrington and Jørgensen also qualified in the K-1 500 metres, resulting in their quota spots being reallocated within the 200 metres (Starović could not receive it, as she had also qualified in the 500 metres). Kichasova-Skoryk, however, had qualified in the K-4 but not the K-1 500 metres; her quota was reallocated to the larger boat classes. The 4 remaining World Championships quota places were allocated as follows:

Rank	Kayaker	Nation	Qualification	Selected competitor
1	Lisa Carrington	New Zealand	Earned quota in K-1 500 m	Could enter via K-1 500, K-2, or K-4
2	Marta Walczykiewicz	Poland	Quota #1 in K-1 200 m	
3	Emma Jørgensen	Denmark	Earned quota in K-1 500 m	Could enter via K-1 500, K-2, or K-4
3	Teresa Portela	Spain	Quota #2 in K-1 200 m	
5	Mariia Kichasova-Skoryk	Ukraine	Earned quota in K-4 500 m	Could enter via K-1 500, K-2, or K-4
6	Dóra Lucz	Hungary	Quota #4 in K-1 200 m	
7	Milica Starović	Serbia	Earned quota in K-1 500 m	Could enter via K-1 500, K-2, or K-4
8	Teresa Portela	Portugal	Quota #5 in K-1 200 m	

Continental and World Cup places:

Nation	Qualification	Selected competitor
Algeria	Africa quota in K-1 200 m	Amira Kheris
Argentina	Americas quota in K-1 200 m	Brenda Rojas
Japan	Asia quota in K-1 200 m	Yuka Ono
Great Britain	Europe quota #1 in K-1 200 m	Emily Lewis
Italy	Europe quota #2 in K-1 200 m	Francesca Genzo
Cook Islands	Oceania quota in K-1 200 m	Jade Tierney
ROC	World Cup quota in K-1 200 m	

Nations with women's kayak quota spots from the K-1 500 metres, K-2 500 metres, or K-4 500 metres could enter (additional) boats as well.

Nation	Selected competitor 1	Selected competitor 2
New Zealand	Lisa Carrington (K-4)	

== Competition format ==
Sprint canoeing uses a four-round format for events with at least 11 boats, with heats, quarterfinals, semifinals, and finals. The specifics of the progression format depend on the number of boats ultimately entered.

The course is a flatwater course 9 metres wide. The name of the event describes the particular format within sprint canoeing. The "K" format means a kayak, with the canoeist sitting, using a double-bladed paddle to paddle, and steering with a foot-operated rudder (as opposed to a canoe, with a kneeling canoeist, single-bladed paddle, and no rudder). The "1" is the number of canoeists in each boat. The "200 metres" is the distance of each race.

== Schedule ==
The event was held over two consecutive days, with two rounds per day. All sessions started at 9:30 a.m. local time, though there are multiple events with races in each session.

Legend
H	Heats	¼	Quarter-finals	½	Semi-finals	F	Final

Sprint
Event↓/Date →	Mon 2		Tue 3		Wed 4	Thu 5	Fri 6	Sat 7
Women's K-1 200 m	H	¼	½	F				

== Results ==
=== Heats ===
Progression System: 1st-2nd to SF, rest to QF.

==== Heat 1 ====
Rank	Lane	Canoer	Country	Time	Notes
1	5	Emma Jørgensen	Denmark	41.572	SF
2	4	Francesca Genzo	Italy	42.198	SF
3	2	Anamaria Govorčinović	Croatia	42.901	QF
4	3	Mariia Kichasova-Skoryk	Ukraine	44.564	QF
5	1	Khaoula Sassi	Tunisia	45.101	QF
6	7	Jade Tierney	Cook Islands	48.271	QF
7	6	Amira Kheris	Algeria	48.306	QF

==== Heat 2 ====
Rank	Lane	Canoer	Country	Time	Notes
1	3	Dóra Lucz	Hungary	41.098	SF
2	5	Marta Walczykiewicz	Poland	41.100	SF
3	4	Linnea Stensils	Sweden	41.109	QF
4	7	Ma Qing	China	42.706	QF
5	1	Joana Vasconcelos	Portugal	43.059	QF
6	6	Léa Jamelot	France	43.589	QF
7	2	Samaa Ahmed	Egypt	47.272	QF

==== Heat 3 ====
Rank	Lane	Canoer	Country	Time	Notes
1	5	Teresa Portela	Spain	40.812	SF
2	3	Anna Kárász	Hungary	41.127	SF
3	4	Deborah Kerr	Great Britain	41.168	QF
4	7	Helena Wiśniewska	Poland	41.407	QF
5	1	Andréanne Langlois	Canada	41.525	QF
6	6	Brenda Rojas	Argentina	43.802	QF
7	2	Anne Cairns	Samoa	46.795	QF

==== Heat 4 ====
Rank	Lane	Canoer	Country	Time	Notes
1	3	Yin Mengdie	China	41.688	SF
2	5	Teresa Portela	Portugal	42.050	SF
3	6	Vanina Paoletti	France	42.334	QF
4	4	Natalia Podolskaya	ROC	42.845	QF
5	7	Yuliia Yuriichuk	Ukraine	43.760	QF
6	1	Sara Milthers	Denmark	43.863	QF
7	2	Yuka Ono	Japan	45.251	QF

==== Heat 5 ====
Rank	Lane	Canoer	Country	Time	Notes
1	5	Lisa Carrington	New Zealand	40.715	SF
2	2	Svetlana Chernigovskaya	ROC	41.540	SF
3	4	Milica Novaković	Serbia	41.579	QF
4	3	Emily Lewis	Great Britain	42.038	QF
5	6	Michelle Russell	Canada	42.236	QF
6	1	Natalya Sergeyeva	Kazakhstan	46.657	QF

=== Quarterfinals ===
Progression System: 1st-2nd to SF, rest out.

==== Quarterfinal 1 ====
Rank	Lane	Canoer	Country	Time	Notes
1	2	Andréanne Langlois	Canada	41.728	SF
2	4	Ma Qing	China	42.321	SF
3	5	Anamaria Govorčinović	Croatia	43.307	
4	6	Joana Vasconcelos	Portugal	43.379	
5	1	Sara Milthers	Denmark	43.675	
6	3	Mariia Kichasova-Skoryk	Ukraine	44.247	
7	8	Samaa Ahmed	Egypt	47.882	
8	7	Jade Tierney	Cook Islands	49.290	

==== Quarterfinal 2 ====
Rank	Lane	Canoer	Country	Time	Notes
1	5	Linnea Stensils	Sweden	41.313	SF
2	4	Milica Novaković	Serbia	41.340	SF
3	3	Helena Wiśniewska	Poland	41.559	
4	7	Léa Jamelot	France	43.338	
5	2	Yuliia Yuriichuk	Ukraine	43.871	
6	6	Khaoula Sassi	Tunisia	45.809	
7	1	Natalya Sergeyeva	Kazakhstan	46.736	
8	8	Anne Cairns	Samoa	47.141	

==== Quarterfinal 3 ====
Rank	Lane	Canoer	Country	Time	Notes
1	5	Deborah Kerr	Great Britain	42.742	SF
2	2	Michelle Russell	Canada	42.940	SF
3	3	Emily Lewis	Great Britain	42.945	
4	4	Vanina Paoletti	France	43.163	
5	6	Natalia Podolskaya	ROC	43.212	
6	7	Brenda Rojas	Argentina	44.876	
7	8	Yuka Ono	Japan	45.610	
8	1	Amira Kheris	Algeria	49.412	

=== Semifinals ===
Progression System: 1st-4th to Final A, rest to Final B.

==== Semifinal 1 ====
Rank	Lane	Canoer	Country	Time	Notes
1	3	Lisa Carrington	New Zealand	38.127	OB, FA
2	5	Emma Jørgensen	Denmark	38.457	FA
3	6	Marta Walczykiewicz	Poland	38.563	FA
4	4	Teresa Portela	Spain	38.858	FA
4	8	Linnea Stensils	Sweden	38.858	FA
6	2	Teresa Portela	Portugal	39.301	FB
7	7	Michelle Russell	Canada	40.224	FB
8	1	Ma Qing	China	40.837	FB

==== Semifinal 2 ====
Rank	Lane	Canoer	Country	Time	Notes
1	4	Dóra Lucz	Hungary	39.713	FA
2	1	Deborah Kerr	Great Britain	39.751	FA
3	7	Andréanne Langlois	Canada	39.952	FA
4	3	Francesca Genzo	Italy	40.000	FA
5	5	Yin Mengdie	China	40.069	FB
6	8	Milica Novaković	Serbia	40.257	FB
7	2	Svetlana Chernigovskaya	ROC	40.433	FB
8	6	Anna Kárász	Hungary	40.724	FB

=== Finals ===
==== Final A ====
Rank	Lane	Canoer	Country	Time	Notes
1st place, gold medalist(s)	5	Lisa Carrington	New Zealand	38.120	OB
2nd place, silver medalist(s)	9	Teresa Portela	Spain	38.883	
3rd place, bronze medalist(s)	3	Emma Jørgensen	Denmark	38.901	
4	7	Marta Walczykiewicz	Poland	39.170	
5	1	Linnea Stensils	Sweden	39.287	
6	4	Dóra Lucz	Hungary	39.442	
7	8	Francesca Genzo	Italy	40.184	
8	6	Deborah Kerr	Great Britain	40.409	
9	2	Andréanne Langlois	Canada	40.473	

==== Final B ====
Rank	Lane	Canoer	Country	Time	Notes
10	5	Teresa Portela	Portugal	39.562	
11	2	Svetlana Chernigovskaya	ROC	39.977	
12	4	Yin Mengdie	China	40.365	
13	3	Michelle Russell	Canada	40.527	
13	6	Milica Novaković	Serbia	40.527	
15	7	Ma Qing	China	40.652	
16	8	Anna Kárász	Hungary	41.242	
