= Canoeing at the 2016 Summer Olympics – Women's K-1 200 metres =

Women's canoe sprint K-1 200 metres at the Games of the XXXI Olympiad
- Venue: Lagoa Stadium
- Date: 15–16 August 2016
- Competitors: 28 from 28 nations
- Winning time: 39.864

Medalists
1st place, gold medalist(s)		Lisa Carrington	New Zealand
2nd place, silver medalist(s)		Marta Walczykiewicz	Poland
3rd place, bronze medalist(s)		Inna Osypenko-Radomska	Azerbaijan

The women's canoe sprint K-1 200 metres at the 2016 Olympic Games in Rio de Janeiro took place between 15 and 16 August at Lagoa Stadium. The medals were presented by Barbara Kendall, IOC member, New Zealand and Maree Burnett, Board Member of the ICF.

== Competition format ==
The competition comprised heats, semifinals, and a final round. The top six boats from each heat progressed to semifinals. The top two boats in each semifinal and the next two best boats overall advanced to the "A" final, and competed for medals. A placing "B" final was held for the next eight best boats.

== Schedule ==
All times are Brasilia Time (UTC-03:00)

Date	Time	Round
Monday 15 August 2016	8:38; 10:00	Heats; Semifinals
Tuesday 16 August 2016	8:47	Finals

== Results ==
=== Heats ===
Top six boats progress to semifinals.

==== Heat 1 ====
Rank	Canoer	Country	Time	Notes
1	Lisa Carrington	New Zealand	40.422	SF
2	Francisca Laia	Portugal	41.368	SF
3	Natasa Dusev-Janics	Hungary	41.403	SF
4	Zhou Yu	China	42.187	SF
5	Olivera Moldovan	Serbia	43.339	SF
6	Marina Toribiong	Palau	48.913	SF
7	Menatalla Karim	Egypt	49.596	

==== Heat 2 ====
Rank	Canoer	Country	Time	Notes
1	Marta Walczykiewicz	Poland	40.263	SF
2	Špela Ponomarenko	Slovenia	40.387	SF
3	Andréanne Langlois	Canada	40.956	SF
4	Inna Klinova	Kazakhstan	41.030	SF
5	Jess Walker	Great Britain	41.123	SF
6	Henriette Engel Hansen	Denmark	42.455	SF
7	Anne Cairns	Samoa	43.652	

==== Heat 3 ====
Rank	Canoer	Country	Time	Notes
1	Sarah Guyot	France	40.317	SF
2	Linnea Stensils	Sweden	40.828	SF
3	Maria Teresa Portela	Spain	40.844	SF
4	Lasma Liepa	Turkey	41.760	SF
5	Viktoria Schwarz	Austria	42.847	SF
6	Ana Paula Vergutz	Brazil	44.239	SF
7	Maggie Hogan	United States	44.668	

==== Heat 4 ====
Rank	Canoer	Country	Time	Notes
1	Inna Osypenko-Radomska	Azerbaijan	40.702	SF
2	Martina Kholova	Slovakia	41.231	SF
3	Bridgitte Ellen Hartley	South Africa	41.698	SF
4	Yusmari Mengana	Cuba	41.701	SF
5	Conny Wassmuth	Germany	41.972	SF
6	Sabrina Ameghino	Argentina	42.417	SF
7	Olga Umaralieva	Uzbekistan	42.525	

=== Semifinals ===
The fastest two canoeists in each semifinal, and the overall next two best boats qualify for the 'A' final. The next eight best boats overall qualify for the 'B' final.

==== Semifinal 1 ====
Rank	Canoer	Country	Time	Notes
1	Marta Walczykiewicz	Poland	40.619	FA
2	Linnea Stensils	Sweden	41.245	FA
3	Bridgitte Ellen Hartley	South Africa	41.478	FB
4	Jess Walker	Great Britain	41.483	FB
5	Francisca Laia	Portugal	41.573	FB
6	Yusmari Mengana	Cuba	41.688	FB
7	Olivera Moldovan	Serbia	42.123	
8	Ana Paula Vergutz	Brazil	44.362	

==== Semifinal 2 ====
Rank	Canoer	Country	Time	Notes
1	Inna Osypenko-Radomska	Azerbaijan	39.803	FA
2	Sarah Guyot	France	40.516	FA
3	Špela Ponomarenko	Slovenia	40.797	FA
4	Natasa Dusev-Janics	Hungary	40.962	FB
5	Zhou Yu	China	41.017	FB
6	Sabrina Ameghino	Argentina	41.934	
7	Viktoria Schwarz	Austria	43.072	
8	Henriette Engel Hansen	Denmark	43.300	

==== Semifinal 3 ====
Rank	Canoer	Country	Time	Notes
1	Lisa Carrington	New Zealand	39.561	FA
2	Maria Teresa Portela	Spain	40.241	FA
3	Inna Klinova	Kazakhstan	40.381	FA
4	Martina Kohlova	Slovakia	41.286	FB
5	Andréanne Langlois	Canada	41.350	FB
6	Conny Wassmuth	Germany	41.725	
7	Lasma Liepa	Turkey	41.866	
8	Marina Toribiong	Palau	48.306	

=== Finals ===
==== Final B ====
Rank	Canoer	Country	Time
1	Natasa Dusev-Janics	Hungary	41.673
2	Martina Kohlova	Slovakia	41.787
3	Zhou Yu	China	41.928
4	Yusmari Mengana	Cuba	42.036
5	Bridgitte Ellen Hartley	South Africa	42.066
6	Andréanne Langlois	Canada	42.099
7	Jess Walker	Great Britain	42.205
8	Francisca Laia	Portugal	42.695

==== Final A ====
Rank	Canoer	Country	Time
1st place, gold medalist(s)	Lisa Carrington	New Zealand	39.864
2nd place, silver medalist(s)	Marta Walczykiewicz	Poland	40.279
3rd place, bronze medalist(s)	Inna Osypenko-Radomska	Azerbaijan	40.401
4	Špela Ponomarenko	Slovenia	40.769
5	Sarah Guyot	France	40.894
6	Maria Teresa Portela	Spain	41.053
7	Linnea Stensils	Sweden	41.293
8	Inna Klinova	Kazakhstan	41.521
