= Canoe World Cup =

Events organized by Canoe Federation

Canoe World Cup refers to a number of events organized by the International Canoe Federation (ICF) across several disciplines: 1) Canoe Sprint World Cup, 2) Canoe Slalom World Cup, 3) Wildwater Canoeing World Cup and 4) Canoe Freestyle World Cup.

The sub-disciplines were single canoe (C1), double canoe (C2), single kayak (K1) and squirt boating.

== Canoe Sprint World Cup ==
=== Men ===
Year	K1 Gold	K1 Silver	K1 Bronze	C1 Gold	C1 Silver	C1 Bronze	World Cup #1	World Cup #2	World Cup #3	World Championship
2013	(Germany) Max Hoff	(Denmark) René Holten Poulsen	(Australia) Ken Wallace	–	–	–	Hungary Szeged	Czech Republic Račice	Poland Poznan	Germany; Duisburg
2014	(Germany) Max Hoff	(Canada) Mark De Jonge	(Denmark) René Holten Poulsen	–	–	–	Italy Milan	Czech Republic Račice	Hungary Szeged	Russia; Moscow
2015	(Canada) Mark De Jonge	(France) Maxime Beaumont	(Germany) Max Hoff	–	–	–	Portugal Montemor-o-Velho	Germany Duisburg	Denmark Copenhagen	Italy; Milan
2016	(Czech Republic) Josef Dostál	(France) Maxime Beaumont	(Denmark) René Holten Poulsen	(Germany) Sebastian Brendel	(China) Li Qiang	(Moldova) Serghei Tarnovschi	Germany Duisburg	Czech Republic Račice	Portugal Montemor-o-Velho	–
2017	(France) Maxime Beaumont	(United Kingdom) Liam Heath	(Portugal) Fernando Pimenta	(Czech Republic) Martin Fuksa	(Poland) Tomasz Kaczor	(Germany) Sebastian Brendel	Portugal Montemor-o-Velho	Hungary Szeged	Serbia Belgrad	Czech Republic; Račice
2018	(Russia) Evgenii Lukantsov	(Portugal) Fernando Pimenta	(Germany) Max Rendschmidt	(Czech Republic) Martin Fuksa	(Germany) Sebastian Brendel	(Brazil) Isaquias Queiroz Dos Santos	Hungary Szeged	Germany Duisburg	–	Portugal; Montemor-o-Velho
2019										

=== Women ===
Year	K1 Gold	K1 Silver	K1 Bronze	C1 Gold	C1 Silver	C1 Bronze	World Cup #1	World Cup #2	World Cup #3	World Championship
2013	(New Zealand); Lisa Carrington	(Germany) Katrin Wagner-Augustin	(Slovenia); Spela Ponomarenko Janic	–	–	–	Hungary Szeged	Czech Republic Račice	Poland Poznan	Germany; Duisburg
2014	(New Zealand) Lisa Carrington	(Austria) Yvonne Schuring	(Poland) Karolina Naja	–	–	–	Italy Milan	Czech Republic Račice	Hungary Szeged	Russia; Moscow
2015	(New Zealand) Lisa Carrington	(China) Zhou Yu	(United Kingdom) Rachel Cawthorn	–	–	–	Portugal Montemor-o-Velho	Germany Duisburg	Denmark Copenhagen	Italy; Milan
2016	(New Zealand) Lisa Carrington	(Azerbaijan) Inna Osypenko-Radomska	(Slovenia) Spela Ponomarenko Janic	(Canada) Katie Vincent	(Ukraine) Liudmyla Luzan	(Poland) Dorota Borowska	Germany Duisburg	Czech Republic Račice	Portugal Montemor-o-Velho	–
2017	(Slovenia) Spela Ponomarenko Janic	(Poland) Marta Walczykiewicz	(New Zealand) Lisa Carrington	(Hungary) Kincső Takács	(Canada) Laurence Vincent-Lapointe	(Hungary) Virág Balla	Portugal Montemor-o-Velho	Hungary Szeged	Serbia Belgrad	Czech Republic; Račice
2018	(Sweden) Linnea Stensils	(Denmark) Emma Aastrand Jørgensen	(France) Sarah Guyot	(Canada) Laurence Vincent-Lapointe	(Russia) Olesia Romasenko	(Poland) Dorota Borowska	Hungary Szeged	Germany Duisburg	–	Portugal; Montemor-o-Velho
2019										

== Canoe Freestyle World Cup ==
=== Men ===
Year	K1 Gold	K1 Silver	K1 Bronze	Squirt Gold	Squirt Silver	Squirt Bronze
2018	(Poland); Tomasz Czaplicki	(Spain); Joaquim Fontané I Maso	(United States); Dane Jackson	(United Kingdom); Alex Edwards	(Poland); Tomasz Czaplicki	(Poland); Bartosz Czaudern

=== Women ===
Year	K1 Gold	K1 Silver	K1 Bronze	Squirt Gold	Squirt Silver	Squirt Bronze
2018	(Poland); Zofia Tula	(France); Marlene Devillez	(Japan); Hitomi Takaku	(Japan); Hitomi Takaku and Yoshiko Suematsu	-	(Poland); Izabela Fidzinska
