= 2022 ICF Canoe Sprint World Championships – Women's K-1 200 metres =

Women's K-1 200 metres at the 2022 ICF Canoe Sprint World Championships
- Venue: Lake Banook
- Location: Dartmouth, Canada
- Dates: 4–7 August
- Competitors: 20 from 20 nations
- Winning time: 41.94

Medalists
gold medal	Lisa Carrington	New Zealand
silver medal	Anja Osterman	Slovenia
bronze medal	Anna Lucz	Hungary

The women's K-1 200 metres competition at the 2022 ICF Canoe Sprint World Championships in Dartmouth took place on Lake Banook.

== Schedule ==
The schedule is as follows:

Date	Time	Round
Thursday 4 August 2022	09:00	Heats
Friday 5 August 2022	14:30	Semifinals
Sunday 7 August 2022	10:00	Final B
Sunday 7 August 2022	11:03	Final A

== Results ==
=== Heats ===
The fastest boat in each heat advanced to the A final.
The next six fastest boats in each heat advanced to the semifinals.

==== Heat 1 ====
Rank	Canoeist	Country	Time	Notes
1	Marta Walczykiewicz	Poland	41.52	QA
2	Vanina Paoletti	France	42.35	QS
3	Sara Milthers	Denmark	42.75	QS
4	Georgia Sinclair	Australia	43.24	QS
5	Mirella Vázquez	Spain	43.51	QS
6	Sabrina Ameghino	Argentina	43.69	QS
	Tatiana Muñoz	Colombia	DNS	

==== Heat 2 ====
Rank	Canoeist	Country	Time	Notes
1	Lisa Carrington	New Zealand	39.46	QA
2	Anja Osterman	Slovenia	41.26	QS
3	Yin Mengdie	China	41.35	QS
4	Esti Olivier	South Africa	42.09	QS
5	Sze Soh	Singapore	43.03	QS
6	Inna Klinova	Ukraine	43.11	QS
7	Isabel Romero	Mexico	44.93	QS

==== Heat 3 ====
Rank	Canoeist	Country	Time	Notes
1	Anna Lucz	Hungary	40.81	QA
2	Teresa Portela	Portugal	41.82	QS
3	Michelle Russell	Canada	42.53	QS
4	Juri Urada	Japan	43.70	QS
5	Eliska Betlachová	Czech Republic	44.59	QS
6	Kali Wilding	United States	45.20	QS

=== Semifinal ===
The fastest three boats in each semi advanced to the A final.
The next four fastest boats in each semi, plus the fastest remaining boat advanced to the B final.

==== Semifinal 1 ====
Rank	Canoeist	Country	Time	Notes
1	Yin Mengdie	China	43.48	QA
2	Teresa Portela	Portugal	44.00	QA
3	Esti Olivier	South Africa	44.01	QA
4	Sara Milthers	Denmark	44.45	QB
5	Inna Klinova	Ukraine	45.05	QB
6	Mirella Vázquez	Spain	45.82	QB
7	Juri Urada	Japan	45.90	QB
8	Sabrina Ameghino	Argentina	46.17	qB

==== Semifinal 2 ====
Rank	Canoeist	Country	Time	Notes
1	Anja Osterman	Slovenia	43.37	QA
2	Vanina Paoletti	France	43.93	QA
3	Michelle Russell	Canada	44.30	QA
4	Sze Soh	Singapore	45.73	QB
5	Georgia Sinclair	Australia	45.80	QB
6	Eliska Betlachová	Czech Republic	47.18	QB
7	Isabel Romero	Mexico	49.42	QB
8	Kali Wilding	United States	50.61	

=== Final ===
==== Final B ====
Competitors raced for positions 10 to 18.

Rank	Canoeist	Country	Time
1	Sara Milthers	Denmark	44.10
2	Georgia Sinclair	Australia	44.66
3	Sabrina Ameghino	Argentina	45.09
4	Juri Urada	Japan	45.11
5	Inna Klinova	Ukraine	45.26
6	Sze Soh	Singapore	45.34
7	Mirella Vázquez	Spain	45.40
8	Eliska Betlachová	Czech Republic	46.23
9	Isabel Romero	Mexico	47.25

==== Final A ====
Competitors raced for positions 1 to 9, with medals going to the top three.

Rank	Canoeist	Country	Time
1st place, gold medalist(s)	Lisa Carrington	New Zealand	41.94
2nd place, silver medalist(s)	Anja Osterman	Slovenia	42.94
3rd place, bronze medalist(s)	Anna Lucz	Hungary	43.09
4	Marta Walczykiewicz	Poland	43.28
5	Yin Mengdie	China	43.63
6	Teresa Portela	Portugal	43.93
7	Vanina Paoletti	France	44.39
8	Michelle Russell	Canada	44.42
9	Esti Olivier	South Africa	44.69
