= Ma Qing =

Chinese canoeist (born 1992)

Personal information
- Born: 马青; 24 August 1992 (age 34) Gaoqing, Shandong, China

Sport
- Country: China
- Sport: Canoe sprint
- Coached by: Gao Beibei
Medal record
Women's sprint canoe
Representing China
Asian Championships
Gold medal – first place	2015 Palembang	K-2 500 m
Gold medal – first place	2015 Palembang	K-4 500 m
Gold medal – first place	2017 Shanghai	K-1 200 m
Gold medal – first place	2017 Shanghai	K-4 200 m
Gold medal – first place	2017 Shanghai	K-4 500 m

Ma Qing (Chinese: 马青; born 24 August 1992) is a Chinese female canoeist. She competed in the women's K-2 500 metres event at the 2016 Summer Olympics. She qualified in the women's K-1 200 metres, and women's K-1 500 metres events at the 2020 Summer Olympics.
