= Toribiong =

Toribiong is a surname. Notable people with the surname include:

- Johnson Toribiong (born 1946), Palauan lawyer and politician
- Marina Toribiong (born 1994), Palauan canoeist
