= Canoe Sprint World Cup =

- Status: active
- Genre: sports event
- Date: midyear
- Frequency: annual
- Inaugurated: 1988 ?
- Organiser: ICF

The ICF Canoe Sprint World Cup is an annual series of races in canoe sprint and one of Canoe World Cup that held under the auspices of the International Canoe Federation. The winning country is determined based on the total scores of all events at all stages (plus World Championship scores). In the Olympic years, only the sum of the World Cup points is calculated.

== World Cup Series ==
=== Canoe sprint ===
Number	Year	Stage 1	Stage 2	Stage 3	Stage 4	Stage 5	Total events	Nation winner
	1988							
	1989							
	1990							
	1991							
	1992							
	1993							
	1994							
	1995							
	1996							
	1997							
	1998							
	1999							
	2000							
1	2001	(United States) Gainesville	(Spain) Seville	(France) Mantes-la-Jolie	(Denmark) Bagsværd	(Croatia) Zagreb		
2	2002	(Belgium) Hazewinkel	(Poland) Poznań	(Germany) Duisburg	(Italy) Milan	(Japan) Komatsu		
3	2003	(Brazil) Curitiba	(Belgium) Hazewinkel	(Hungary) Szeged	(Germany) Duisburg	(Croatia) Zagreb		
4	2004	(Greece) Schinias	(Germany) Duisburg	(Czech Republic) Račice				
5	2005	(Poland) Poznań	(Germany) Duisburg					
6	2006	(Poland) Poznań	(Germany) Duisburg	(China) Guangzhou				
7	2007	(Croatia) Zagreb	(Hungary) Szeged	(France) Gerardmer				
8	2008	(Hungary) Szeged	(Germany) Duisburg					
9	2009	(Czech Republic) Račice	(Poland) Poznań	(Hungary) Szeged				
10	2010	(France) Vichy	(Hungary) Szeged	(Germany) Duisburg				
11	2011	(Poland) Poznań	(Czech Republic) Račice	(Germany) Duisburg				Germany
12	2012	(Poland) Poznań	(Germany) Duisburg	(Russia) Moscow				Germany
13	2013	(Hungary) Szeged	(Czech Republic) Račice	(Poland) Poznań				Germany
14	2014	(Italy) Milan	(Czech Republic) Račice	(Hungary) Szeged				Germany
15	2015	(Portugal) Montemor-o-Velho	(Germany) Duisburg	(Denmark) Copenhagen				Germany
16	2016	(Germany) Duisburg	(Czech Republic) Račice	(Portugal) Montemor-o-Velho				Germany
17	2017	(Portugal) Montemor-o-Velho	(Hungary) Szeged	(Serbia) Belgrade				Germany
18	2018	(Hungary) Szeged	(Germany) Duisburg					Germany
19	2019	(Poland) Poznań	(Germany) Duisburg					
20	2020	(Hungary) Szeged						
21	2021	(Hungary) Szeged	(Russia) Barnaul					
22	2022	(Czech Republic) Račice	(Poland) Poznań					
23	2023	(Hungary) Szeged	(Poland) Poznań	(France) Paris				
24	2024	(Hungary) Szeged	(Poland) Poznań					
25	2025	(Hungary) Szeged	(Poland) Poznań					

=== Para Canoe Sprint ===
Para Canoe sprint World Cup was started since 2015 (2016 not held).

Number	Year	Stage	Total Events	Nation Winner
1	2015	(Germany) Duisburg		
2	2017	(Hungary) Szeged		
3	2018	(Hungary) Szeged		
4	2019	(Poland) Poznań		
5	2020	(Hungary) Szeged		
6	2021	(Hungary) Szeged		
7	2022	(Poland) Poznań		

== Results ==
2021 Results:

- Article title
- http://results.imas-sport.com/imas/regatta.php?competition=wettkampf_238
- https://www.the-sports.org/canoeing-world-cup-flat-water-2021-medals-epa113736.html
- https://www.the-sports.org/canoeing-paracanoe-world-cup-results-2021-women-epf113739.html
- https://www.the-sports.org/canoeing-paracanoe-world-cup-results-2021-men-epm113739.html#503452#503452

== See also ==
- ICF Canoe Sprint World Championships
- Canoeing at the Summer Olympics
- Canoe World Cup
- Rowing World Cup
- Sailing World Cup
