= 2025 ICF Canoe Sprint World Championships – Women's K-1 200 metres =

Women's K-1 200 metres at the 2025 ICF Canoe Sprint World Championships
- Venue: Idroscalo Regatta Course
- Location: Milan, Italy
- Dates: 21–24 August
- Competitors: 29 from 29 nations
- Winning time: 41.46

Medalists
gold medal	Wang Nan	China
silver medal	Anja Osterman	Slovenia
bronze medal	Emily Lewis	Great Britain

The women's K-1 200 metres competition at the 2025 ICF Canoe Sprint World Championships in Milan took place in Idroscalo Regatta Course.

== Schedule ==
The schedule is as follows:

Date	Time	Round
Thursday 21 August 2025	09:20	Heats
Saturday 23 August 2025	09:25	Semifinals
Sunday 24 August 2025	09:40	Final B
Sunday 24 August 2025	10:10	Final A

== Results ==
=== Heats ===
The fastest six fastest boats (QS) in each heat plus the fastest three remaining boats (qs), advanced to the semi-finals.

==== Heat 1 ====
Rank	Canoeist	Country	Time	Notes
1	Anja Osterman	Slovenia	40.80	QS
2	Milica Novaković	Serbia	41.18	QS
3	Bianka Sidová	Slovakia	41.52	QS
4	Esti Olivier	South Africa	42.79	QS
5	Elena Wolgamot	United States	43.20	QS
6	Juri Urada	Japan	43.40	QS
7	Parvathy Geetha	India	45.88	qS
8	Ailyn González	Mexico	46.35	

==== Heat 2 ====
Rank	Canoeist	Country	Time	Notes
1	Lucrezia Zironi	Italy	41.09	QS
2	Ivanna Dyachenko	Ukraine	41.14	QS
3	Julia Lagerstam	Sweden	41.40	QS
4	Alida Dóra Gazsó	Hungary	41.54	QS
5	Krista Berzina	Latvia	42.19	QS
6	Barbora Sovová	Czech Republic	42.74	QS
7	Stevani Maysche Ibo	Indonesia	43.34	qS

==== Heat 3 ====
Rank	Canoeist	Country	Time	Notes
1	Julia Olszewska	Poland	41.02	QS
2	Teresa Portela	Portugal	41.40	QS
3	Bolette Nyvang Iversen	Denmark	41.43	QS
4	Anastasiia Dolgova	Individual Neutral Athletes	41.91	QS
5	Alexandra Clarke	Australia	42.95	QS
6	Elise Austvoll Erland	Norway	44.32	QS
7	Yan Siou-hua	Chinese Taipei	48.40	

==== Heat 4 ====
Rank	Canoeist	Country	Time	Notes
1	Toshka Besharah	Canada	40.37	QS
2	Emily Lewis	Great Britain	41.15	QS
3	Wang Nan	China	41.29	QS
4	Nerea García	Spain	42.03	QS
5	Tatyana Tokarnitskaya	Kazakhstan	42.40	QS
6	Ekaterina Shubina	Uzbekistan	42.77	QS
7	Jo Shin-young	South Korea	45.23	qS

=== Semifinals ===
The fastest three boats in each semi advanced to the A final. The next three fastest boats in each semi advanced to the final B.

==== Semifinal 1 ====
Rank	Canoeist	Country	Time	Notes
1	Bolette Nyvang Iversen	Denmark	41.80	FA
2	Anastasiia Dolgova	Individual Neutral Athletes	41.82	FA
3	Toshka Besharah	Canada	41.87	FA
4	Milica Novaković	Serbia	41.89	FB
5	Lucrezia Zironi	Italy	42.17	FB
6	Barbora Sovová	Czech Republic	43.64	FB
7	Tatyana Tokarnitskaya	Kazakhstan	43.65	
8	Juri Urada	Japan	44.29	
9	Stevani Maysche Ibo	Indonesia	44.95	

==== Semifinal 2 ====
Rank	Canoeist	Country	Time	Notes
1	Julia Olszewska	Poland	42.14	FA
2	Julia Lagerstam	Sweden	42.27	FA
3	Emily Lewis	Great Britain	42.28	FA
4	Bianka Sidová	Slovakia	42.47	FB
5	Alida Dóra Gazsó	Hungary	42.62	FB
6	Nerea García	Spain	43.83	FB
7	Elena Wolgamot	United States	43.99	
8	Elise Austvoll Erland	Norway	45.31	
9	Jo Shin-young	South Korea	46.36	

==== Semifinal 3 ====
Rank	Canoeist	Country	Time	Notes
1	Anja Osterman	Slovenia	41.36	FA
2	Wang Nan	China	41.42	FA
3	Ivanna Dyachenko	Ukraine	41.59	FA
4	Teresa Portela	Portugal	41.97	FB
5	Krista Berzina	Latvia	43.03	FB
6	Esti Olivier	South Africa	43.25	FB
7	Ekaterina Shubina	Uzbekistan	43.65	
8	Alexandra Clarke	Australia	43.87	
9	Parvathy Geetha	India	47.09	

=== Finals ===
==== Final B ====
Competitors in this final raced for positions 10 to 18.

Rank	Canoeist	Country	Time	Notes
1	Lucrezia Zironi	Italy	42.44	
2	Milica Novaković	Serbia	42.67	
3	Alida Dóra Gazsó	Hungary	42.77	
4	Teresa Portela	Portugal	42.87	
5	Bianka Sidová	Slovakia	43.11	
6	Esti Olivier	South Africa	43.45	
7	Krista Berzina	Latvia	43.82	
8	Nerea García	Spain	44.06	
9	Barbora Sovová	Czech Republic	44.87	

==== Final A ====
Competitors raced for positions 1 to 9, with medals going to the top three.

Rank	Canoeist	Country	Time	Notes
1st place, gold medalist(s)	Wang Nan	China	41.46	
2nd place, silver medalist(s)	Anja Osterman	Slovenia	41.61	
3rd place, bronze medalist(s)	Emily Lewis	Great Britain	41.66	
4	Bolette Nyvang Iversen	Denmark	41.71	
5	Ivanna Dyachenko	Ukraine	41.89	
6	Julia Olszewska	Poland	42.10	
7	Anastasiia Dolgova	Individual Neutral Athletes	42.35	
8	Toshka Besharah	Canada	42.48	
9	Julia Lagerstam	Sweden	42.49	
