= Yuliia Yuriichuk =

Ukrainian canoeist (born 1998)

Personal information
- Nationality: Ukrainian
- Born: Юлія Юрійчук; 1 July 1998 (age 28) Uman, Ukraine
- Height: 173 cm (5 ft 8 in)
- Weight: 70 kg (154 lb)

Sport
- Country: Ukraine
- Sport: Canoe sprint
- Event: Kayaking

Yuliia Yuriichuk (Ukrainian: Юлія Юрійчук; born 1 July 1998) is a Ukrainian canoeist. She represented Ukraine at the 2020 Summer Olympics.

== Sports career ==
Before she qualified for the 2020 Summer Olympics, Yuriichuk rarely competed at international level. Nevertheless, she managed to qualify to Tokyo during the 2021 Cup of Ukraine.

Yuriichuk competed in two events at the Games in Tokyo. In the K-1 200 metres event, she finished 5th in heat 4 and 5th in quarterfinal 2. In the K-1 500 metres event, she finished 5th in heat 2, 3rd in quarterfinal 1 and 8th in semifinal 2.

== Personal life ==
Yuriichuk graduated from Tychyna Pedagogical University. Her hobby is travelling.

== Links ==
- Profile on the International Canoe Federation's website
- Yuliia Yuriichuk on Instagram
