= 2017 ICF Canoe Sprint World Championships – Women's K-1 1000 metres =

Women's K-1 1000 metres at the 2017 ICF Canoe Sprint World Championships
- Venue: Sportcentrum Račice
- Location: Račice, Czech Republic
- Dates: 25–27 August
- Competitors: 17 from 17 nations
- Winning time: 3:55.971

Medalists
| gold medal | Alyce Burnett | Australia |
| silver medal | Karin Johansson | Sweden |
| bronze medal | Rachel Cawthorn | Great Britain |

The 2017 ICF Canoe Sprint World Championships women's K-1 1000 metres race took place at the Sportcentrum Račice in Račice, Czech Republic.

The event took place between 25 and 27 August, 2017. It was won by Alyce Burnett of Australia.

== Schedule ==
| Date | Time | Round |
|---|---|---|
| Friday 25 August 2017 | 12:36 | Heats |
| Friday 25 August 2017 | 17:29 | Semifinal |
| Sunday 27 August 2017 | 10:16 | Final |

All times are Central European Summer Time (UTC+2)

== Results ==
=== Heats ===
The three fastest finishers in each heat advanced directly to the final.

The next four fastest finishers in each heat, plus the fastest remaining finisher overall, advanced to the semifinal.

==== Heat 1 ====
| Rank | Kayaker | Country | Time | Notes |
|---|---|---|---|---|
| 1 | Alyce Burnett | Australia | 3:54.232 | QF |
| 2 | Dóra Bodonyi | Hungary | 3:54.404 | QF |
| 3 | Tabea Medert | Germany | 4:04.259 | QF |
| 4 | Anna Kožíšková | Czech Republic | 4:08.998 | QS |
| 5 | Yuliia Kolesnik | Ukraine | 4:13.493 | QS |
| 6 | Livia Haudenschild | Switzerland | 4:14.159 | QS |
| 7 | Karolina Markiewicz | Poland | 4:15.559 | QS |
| 8 | Nina Riosa | Estonia | 4:17.665 | QS |
| – | Ragina Kiro | India | DNS | |

==== Heat 2 ====
| Rank | Kayaker | Country | Time | Notes |
|---|---|---|---|---|
| 1 | Karin Johansson | Sweden | 3:57.422 | QF |
| 2 | Rachel Cawthorn | Great Britain | 4:00.389 | QF |
| 3 | Dariya Baicheuskaya | Belarus | 4:01.045 | QF |
| 4 | Netta Malinen | Finland | 4:02.978 | QS |
| 5 | Laia Pelachs | Spain | 4:05.011 | QS |
| 6 | Hilal Avci | Turkey | 4:16.239 | QS |
| 7 | Geraldine Lee | Singapore | 4:17.222 | QS |
| 8 | Arezoo Hakimi | Iran | 4:22.689 | |

=== Semifinal ===
The three fastest finishers advanced to the final.

| Rank | Kayaker | Country | Time | Notes |
|---|---|---|---|---|
| 1 | Laia Pelachs | Spain | 4:02.282 | QF |
| 2 | Netta Malinen | Finland | 4:02.371 | QF |
| 3 | Anna Kožíšková | Czech Republic | 4:05.626 | QF |
| 4 | Karolina Markiewicz | Poland | 4:06.110 | |
| 5 | Yuliia Kolesnik | Ukraine | 4:12.160 | |
| 6 | Hilal Avci | Turkey | 4:12.338 | |
| 7 | Livia Haudenschild | Switzerland | 4:14.238 | |
| 8 | Geraldine Lee | Singapore | 4:18.649 | |
| 9 | Nina Riosa | Estonia | 4:19.760 | |

=== Final ===
Medals were awarded to the top three finishers.

| Rank | Kayaker | Country | Time |
|---|---|---|---|
| 1st place, gold medalist(s) | Alyce Burnett | Australia | 3:55.971 |
| 2nd place, silver medalist(s) | Karin Johansson | Sweden | 3:58.181 |
| 3rd place, bronze medalist(s) | Rachel Cawthorn | Great Britain | 3:59.036 |
| 4 | Tabea Medert | Germany | 4:00.646 |
| 5 | Dóra Bodonyi | Hungary | 4:01.786 |
| 6 | Laia Pelachs | Spain | 4:02.631 |
| 7 | Dariya Baicheuskaya | Belarus | 4:02.751 |
| 8 | Netta Malinen | Finland | 4:04.881 |
| 9 | Anna Kožíšková | Czech Republic | 4:07.031 |
