= Biljana Relić =

Serbian canoeist

Personal information
- Nationality: Serbia
- Born: March 21, 1999 (age 27) Novi Sad
- Height: 1.70 m (5 ft 7 in)
- Weight: 69 kg (152 lb)

Sport
- Sport: Canoe racing
- Club: KKK Pančevo
Medal record
Women's canoe sprint
Representing Serbia
World U23 Championships
Bronze medal – third place	2017 Pitesti	K-1 200 m
European U23 Championships
Gold medal – first place	2019 Racice	K-2 500 m
Gold medal – first place	2019 Racice	K-1 200 m
Silver medal – second place	2018 Auronzo di Cadore	K-2 500 m
Gold medal – first place	2018 Auronzo di Cadore	K-1 200 m
Silver medal – second place	2017 Belgrade	K-1 200 m
European Junior Championships
Gold medal – first place	2016 Plovdiv	K-1 200 m
Gold medal – first place	2016 Plovdiv	K-2 500 m

Biljana Relić (Serbian Cyrillic: Биљана Релић; born 21 March 1998) is a Serbian sprint canoer.

Her last victories are the women's k-2 500m with Marija Dostanić and the women's k-1 200m kayak single in the European Sprint Championships U-23 2019.

She finished 13th in the K-1 200 metres event at the 2018 Canoe Sprint World Championships.
