= Jade Tierney =

Cook Islands canoeist

Personal information
- Born: 18 April 2004 (age 22)

Sport
- Sport: Canoe sprint

Jade Tierney (born 18 April 2004) is a Cook Island canoeist. She competed in the women's K-1 200 metres event at the 2020 Summer Olympics.
