= Emily Lewis =

British canoeist

Personal information
- Full name: Emily Elizabeth Lewis
- Nationality: British
- Born: 15 May 1993 (age 33) Royal Tunbridge Wells, Great Britain
- Height: 170 cm (5 ft 7 in)
- Weight: 63 kg (139 lb)

Sport
- Country: Great Britain
- Sport: Canoe sprint
- Event: Kayak

Achievements and titles
- Olympic finals: Tokyo 2020
Medal record
World Championships
| Bronze medal – third place | 2025 Milan | K-1 200 m |

Emily Elizabeth Lewis (born 15 May 1993) is a British canoeist. She competed in the women's K-1 200 metres and the K-1 500 metres events at the 2020 Summer Olympics.
