= Samoa at the 2016 Summer Olympics =

- IOC code: SAM
- NOC: Samoa Association of Sports and National Olympic Committee Inc.
- Website: www.oceaniasport.com/samoa

in Rio de Janeiro
- Competitors: 8 in 5 sports
- Flag bearer: Mary Opeloge
- Medals: Gold 0 Silver 0 Bronze 0 Total 0

Summer Olympics appearances (overview)
- 1984; 1988; 1992; 1996; 2000; 2004; 2008; 2012; 2016; 2020; 2024; 2028

Samoa competed at the 2016 Summer Olympics in Rio de Janeiro, Brazil, from 5 to 21 August 2016. This was the nation's ninth consecutive appearance at the Summer Olympic Games, although it had previously competed in four editions under the name Western Samoa.

Samoa Association of Sports and National Olympic Committee Inc. (SASNOC) sent the nation's second-largest delegation to the Games, tying its record for the most athletes with Los Angeles 1984 and London 2012. A total of eight athletes, five men and three women, were selected to the Samoan squad across five different sports; all of them made their Olympic debut in Rio de Janeiro. Among the sports represented by the athletes, Samoa marked its Olympic debut in swimming.

Four Samoan athletes were born and raised in the United States and New Zealand, having acquired a dual citizenship to compete for their parents' homeland at the Games. Among them were New Zealand-born flatwater kayaker Anne Cairns, discus thrower Alex Rose, sprinter Jeremy Dodson, and 18-year-old freestyle swimmer Brandon Schuster. Meanwhile, weightlifter and Commonwealth Games champion Mary Opeloge (women's 75 kg) continued the tradition of her family in carrying the Samoan flag at the opening ceremony, with her older sister Ele having had the honor in 2008 and 2012. Samoa, however, has yet to win its first ever Olympic medal.

== Athletics ==
Two athletes was selected to represent Samoa at the 2016 Olympics. The first was Jeremy Dodson who was competing in his first (and only) Olympics. After formally representing the United States at the 2011 Pan American Games, he was selected to compete for Samoa by his parent side.

Key

- Note–Ranks given for track events are within the athlete's heat only
- Q = Qualified for the next round
- q = Qualified for the next round as a fastest loser or, in field events, by position without achieving the qualifying target
- NR = National record
- N/A = Round not applicable for the event
- Bye = Athlete not required to compete in round
- NM = No mark

Track & road events

Athlete	Event	Heat		Semifinal		Final	
Athlete	Event	Result	Rank	Result	Rank	Result	Rank
Jeremy Dodson	Men's 200 m	20.51	5	Did not advance			

Field events

Athlete	Event	Qualification		Final	
Athlete	Event	Distance	Position	Distance	Position
Alex Rose	Men's discus throw	57.24	29	Did not advance	

== Canoeing ==
=== Sprint ===
Samoan canoeists have qualified one boat in each of the following events through the 2016 Oceania Championships.

Athlete	Event	Heats		Semifinals		Final	
Athlete	Event	Time	Rank	Time	Rank	Time	Rank
Anne Cairns	Women's K-1 200 m	43.652	7	Did not advance			
Anne Cairns	Women's K-1 500 m	2:01.885	7	Did not advance			

Qualification Legend: FA = Qualify to final (medal); FB = Qualify to final B (non-medal)

== Judo ==
Samoa qualified one judoka for the men's heavyweight category (+100 kg) at the Games. Derek Sua earned a continental quota spot from the Oceania region, as the highest-ranked Samoan judoka outside of direct qualifying position in the IJF World Ranking List of May 30, 2016. Sua was eliminated in the second round by Abdullo Tangriev.

Athlete	Event	Round of 32	Round of 16	Quarterfinals	Semifinals	Repechage	Final / BM	
Athlete	Event	Opposition Result	Opposition Result	Opposition Result	Opposition Result	Opposition Result	Opposition Result	Rank
Derek Sua	Men's +100 kg	Tangriev (UZB); L 000–100	Did not advance					

== Swimming ==
Samoa has received a Universality invitation from FINA to send two swimmers (one male and one female) to the Olympics, signifying the nation's debut in the sport.

Athlete	Event	Heat		Semifinal		Final	
Athlete	Event	Time	Rank	Time	Rank	Time	Rank
Brandon Schuster	Men's 200 m freestyle	1:57:72	46	Did not advance			
Evelina Afoa	Women's 100 m backstroke	1:08.74	32	Did not advance			

== Weightlifting ==
Samoa has qualified one male and one female weightlifter for the Rio Olympics by virtue of a top five national finish (for men) and top four (for women), respectively, at the 2016 Oceania Championships.

Athlete	Event	Snatch		Clean & Jerk		Total	Rank
Athlete	Event	Result	Rank	Result	Rank	Total	Rank
Vaipava Nevo Ioane	Men's −62 kg	120	=10	161	=6	281	8
Mary Opeloge	Women's −75 kg	100	9	118	11	218	11
