= Samoa at the 2020 Summer Olympics =

- IOC code: SAM
- NOC: Samoa Association of Sports and National Olympic Committee Inc.
- Website: www.sasnoc.com

in Tokyo, Japan July 23, 2021 – August 8, 2021
- Competitors: 8 in 5 sports
- Flag bearer (opening): Alex Rose
- Flag bearer (closing): Anne Cairns
- Medals: Gold 0 Silver 0 Bronze 0 Total 0

Summer Olympics appearances (overview)
- 1984; 1988; 1992; 1996; 2000; 2004; 2008; 2012; 2016; 2020; 2024

Samoa competed at the 2020 Summer Olympics in Tokyo. Originally scheduled to take place from 24 July to 9 August 2020, the Games were postponed to 23 July to 8 August 2021, because of the COVID-19 pandemic. It was the nation's tenth consecutive appearance at the Summer Olympic Games, for four of which it competed under the name Western Samoa.

The Samoan government in July 2021 released an order which barred athletes based in Samoa to compete in the Olympics due to rising COVID-19 infections in Japan. This meant that only Samoan athletes based overseas could compete in the games. For the first time since its debuted in 1984, none of the Samoan weightlifters had been qualified.

== Competitors ==
The following is the list of number of competitors in the Games.

Sport	Men	Women	Total
Athletics	1	0	1
Boxing	2	0	2
Canoeing	2	1	3
Judo	1	0	1
Sailing	1	0	1
Total	7	1	8

== Athletics ==
Samoan athletes further achieved the entry standards, either by qualifying time or by world ranking, in the following track and field events (up to a maximum of 3 athletes in each event):

Key

- Note–Ranks given for track events are within the athlete's heat only
- Q = Qualified for the next round
- q = Qualified for the next round as a fastest loser or, in field events, by position without achieving the qualifying target
- NR = National record
- N/A = Round not applicable for the event
- Bye = Athlete not required to compete in round

Field events

Athlete	Event	Qualification		Final	
Athlete	Event	Distance	Position	Distance	Position
Alex Rose	Men's discus throw	61.72	18	Did not advance	

== Boxing ==
Samoa entered two male boxers into the Olympic tournament for the first time since Beijing 2008. Marion Faustino Ah Tong (men's welterweight) and the reigning Pacific Games champion Ato Plodzicki-Faoagali (men's heavyweight) topped the list of eligible boxers from Asia and Oceania in their respective weight divisions to secure places on the Samoan team based on the IOC's Boxing Task Force Rankings.

Athlete	Event	Round of 32	Round of 16	Quarterfinals	Semifinals	Final	
Athlete	Event	Opposition Result	Opposition Result	Opposition Result	Opposition Result	Opposition Result	Rank
Marion Faustino Ah Tong	Men's welterweight	Zimba (ZAM); L 0–5	Did not advance				
Ato Plodzicki-Faoagali	Men's heavyweight	Bye	Smiahlikau (BLR); L 1–4	Did not advance			

== Canoeing ==
=== Sprint ===
Samoan canoeists qualified boats in each of the following distances for the Games through the 2020 Oceania Championships in Penrith, New South Wales.

Athlete	Event	Heats		Quarterfinals		Semifinals		Final	
Athlete	Event	Time	Rank	Time	Rank	Time	Rank	Time	Rank
Rudolph Berking-Williams	Men's K-1 200 m	42.083	5 QF	41.950	5	Did not advance			
Rudolph Berking-Williams	Men's C-1 1000 m	5:19.538	8 QF	DNS		Did not advance			
Clifton Tuva'a	Men's K-1 200 m	38.363	4 QF	38.287	4	Did not advance			
Clifton Tuva'a	Men's K-1 1000 m	4:11.029	4 QF	4:21.301	4	Did not advance			
Rudolph Berking-Williams; Clifton Tuva'a	Men's K-2 1000 m	3:55.617	5 QF	3:46.523	5 FB	Bye		3:56.171	16
Anne Cairns	Women's K-1 200 m	46.795	7 QF	47.141	8	Did not advance			
Anne Cairns	Women's K-1 500 m	2:03.667	6 QF	2:02.525	4	Did not advance			

Qualification Legend: FA = Qualify to final A (medal); FB = Qualify to final B (non-medal)

== Judo ==
Samoa qualified one judoka for the men's half-middleweight category (81 kg) at the Games. Peniamina Percival accepted a continental berth from Oceania as the nation's top-ranked judoka outside of direct qualifying position in the IJF World Ranking List of June 28, 2021.

Athlete	Event	Round of 64	Round of 32	Round of 16	Quarterfinals	Semifinals	Repechage	Final / BM	
Athlete	Event	Opposition Result	Opposition Result	Opposition Result	Opposition Result	Opposition Result	Opposition Result	Opposition Result	Rank
Peniamina Percival	Men's −81 kg	Bye	de Wit (NED); L 00–01	Did not advance					

== Sailing ==
Samoan sailors qualified one boat in each of the following classes through the class-associated World Championships, and the continental regattas, marking the country's debut in the sport.

Athlete	Event	Race											Net points	Final rank
Athlete	Event	1	2	3	4	5	6	7	8	9	10	M*	Net points	Final rank
Eroni Leilua	Men's Laser	31	27	30	32	32	27	30	31	~~35~~	28	EL	268	32

M = Medal race; EL = Eliminated – did not advance into the medal race
