= Račice (Třebíč District) =

- Municipality
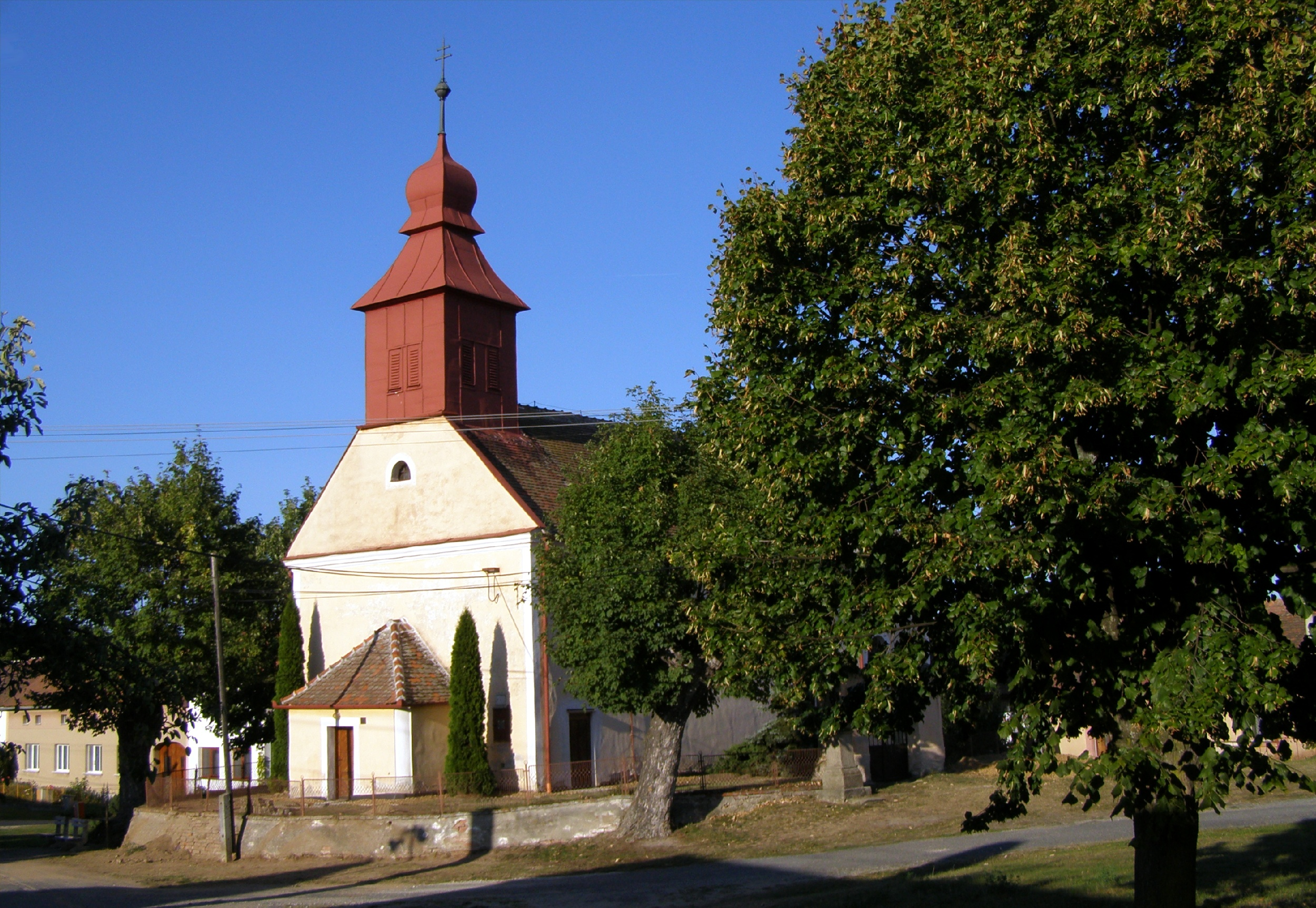
- Church of Saint Wenceslaus

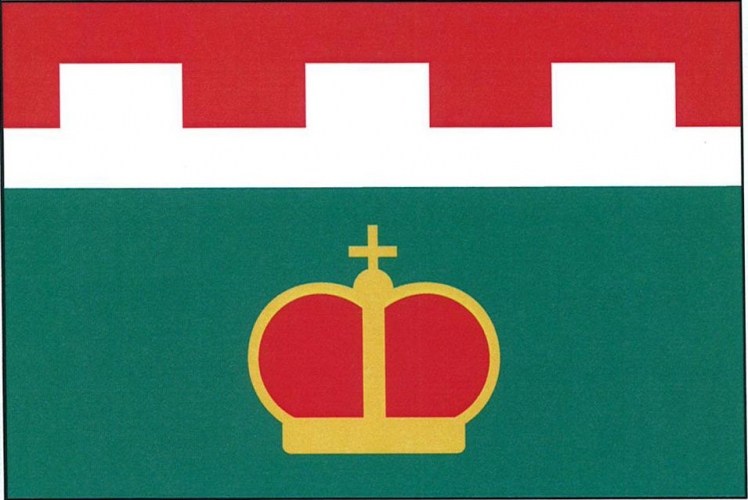
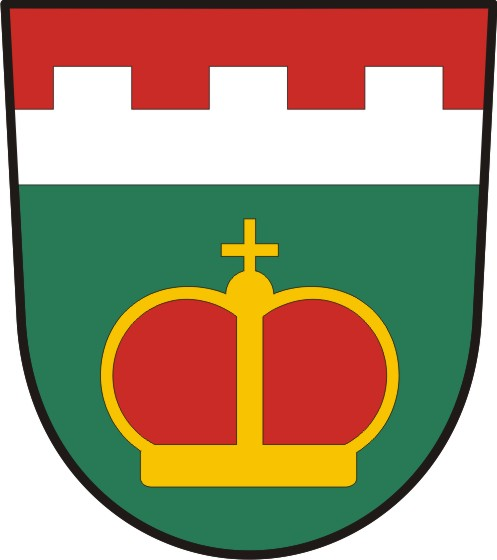
- Flag Coat of arms

- Location in the Czech Republic
- Coordinates: 49°6′29″N 16°1′29″E
- Country: Czech Republic
- Region: Vysočina
- District: Třebíč
- First mentioned: 1252

Area
  - Total: 3.61 km^{2} (1.39 sq mi)
- Elevation: 433 m (1,421 ft)

Population (2026-01-01)
  - Total: 85
  - Density: 24/km^{2} (61/sq mi)
- Time zone: UTC+1 (CET)
  - Summer (DST): UTC+2 (CEST)
- Postal code: 675 55
- Website: www.hrotovicko.cz/racice/

Račice is a municipality and village in Třebíč District in the Vysočina Region of the Czech Republic. It has about 90 inhabitants.

Račice lies approximately 16 kilometres (10 mi) south-east of Třebíč, 45 km (28 mi) south-east of Jihlava, and 158 km (98 mi) south-east of Prague.

== Demographics ==
Historical population
Year	Pop.	±%
1869	130	—
1880	137	+5.4%
1890	142	+3.6%
1900	167	+17.6%
1910	191	+14.4%
1921	176	−7.9%
1930	161	−8.5%
1950	144	−10.6%
1961	155	+7.6%
1970	137	−11.6%
1980	106	−22.6%
1991	77	−27.4%
2001	77	+0.0%
2011	74	−3.9%
2021	82	+10.8%
Source: Censuses
