= Inna Osypenko-Radomska =

Ukrainian-Azerbaijani kayaker

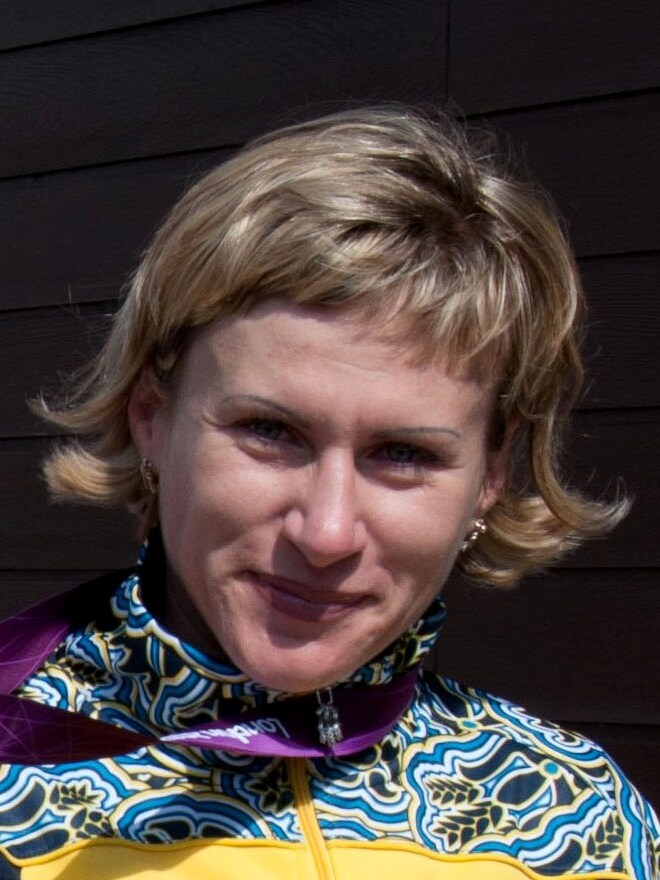
- Osypenko-Radomska in 2012

Personal information
- Native name: Інна Володимирівна Осипенко-Радомська
- Full name: Inna Volodymyrivna Osypenko-Radomska
- Born: 20 August 1982 (age 44) Novoraysk, Beryslav Raion, Kherson Oblast, Ukrainian SSR, Soviet Union
Medal record
Women's canoe sprint
Representing Azerbaijan
Olympic Games
Bronze medal – third place	2016 Rio de Janeiro	K-1 200 m
Representing Ukraine
Olympic Games
Gold medal – first place	2008 Beijing	K-1 500 m
Silver medal – second place	2012 London	K-1 500 m
Silver medal – second place	2012 London	K-1 200 m
Bronze medal – third place	2004 Athens	K-4 500 m
World Championships
Gold medal – first place	2010 Poznań	K-1 500 m
Silver medal – second place	2003 Gainesville	K-4 1000 m
Silver medal – second place	2010 Poznań	K-1 200 m
Bronze medal – third place	2001 Poznań	K-4 1000 m
Bronze medal – third place	2011 Szeged	K-1 200 m
Bronze medal – third place	2011 Szeged	K-1 500 m
European Championships
Gold medal – first place	2001 Milan	K-4 1000 m
Gold medal – first place	2004 Poznań	K-4 500 m
Silver medal – second place	2008 Milan	K-1 200 m
Silver medal – second place	2011 Belgrade	K-1 500 m
Bronze medal – third place	2007 Pontevedra	K-1 200 m

Inna Volodymyrivna Osypenko-Radomska (Ukrainian: Інна Володимирівна Осипенко-Радомська, born 20 September 1982) is a Ukrainian-Azerbaijani sprint kayaker. Competing for Ukraine, she won four Olympic medals, including gold at the 2008 Olympics in K-1 500 m. She switched to Azerbaijan in 2014 and won a bronze medal in K-1 200 m at the 2016 Olympics.

== Career ==
In 1997, Osypenko-Radomska started her sports career in the Kyiv sports boarding school, where her first coach was Serhiy Dubinin. However, her involvement in rowing sports began in the late 1980s as her native village had a rowing station on the Dnieper.

Osypenko-Radomska competed for Ukraine until 2014. She won a bronze medal in the K-4 1000 m at the 2001 ICF Canoe Sprint World Championships and silver in the same event at the 2003 World Championships. At the 2004 Summer Olympics, she took bronze in the K-4 500 metres.

Osypenko-Radomska was the K-1 500 m champion at the 2008 Summer Olympics, after finishing ahead of her Hungarian counterpart Katalin Kovács, who, as she thought, was out of reach for her. In that race, Kovacs finished fourth. Earlier, in 2006, she had her first child and returned to sports in 10 days after giving birth. She was eager to qualify for the 2008 Summer Olympics. After those Olympics in December of 2008, Inna suffered an injury when she tore the anterior cruciate ligament of her knee and later received a wrong diagnosis that led to muscle atrophy. At the 2010 World Championships, she won gold in K-1 500 m and silver in K-1 200 m. She was awarded two bronze medals – in the K-1 200 m and K-1 500 m – at the 2011 World Championships. The following year, she won silver medals in the K-1 500 m and K-1 200 m at the 2012 Summer Olympics in London.

Osypenko-Radomska began competing for Azerbaijan in 2014. She won a bronze medal in K-1 200 m at the 2016 Summer Olympics in Rio de Janeiro.

On 29 August 2018, she was disqualified for four years after refusing an out-of-competition doping test in May 2018.

Following the 2022 Russian invasion of Ukraine, Osypenko emigrated to Slovakia, where Inna is a coach at Dunajčík, a Bratislava club, helping the local Ukrainian community.

In an interview with the internet news outlet "sport24.ua", Osypenko-Radomska explained that she was born de facto in Kherson, but for the first six months after her birth, they lived in Novoraysk, a home village of her father. She also said that after the 2022 Russian invasion of Ukraine, the Russian soldiers destroyed the homes of both her parents, who are originally from neighboring villages. Also, the local village store owned by her family was looted by the Russian soldiers. Inna also stated that the reason that she started represented the Azerbaijan Olympic team was that the Ukraine Olympic team refused to include her at that time due to age.

Inna Osypenko-Radomska has two children who are involved in sports. The hyphenated second portion of her last name after her husband, Dmytro Radomskyi, who was her coach.

== State decorations ==
- Order of Merit, 3rd Class (4 September 2008) — for achieving high sporting results at the 2008 Summer Olympics in Beijing (People's Republic of China), showing courage, dedication and will to win, raising the international prestige of Ukraine
- Order of Princess Olga, 3rd Class (18 September 2004) — for achieving significant sporting results at the 2004 Summer Olympics in Athens, raising the international prestige of Ukraine
