= Samaa Ahmed =

Egyptian canoeist

Personal information
- Born: 22 July 1998 (age 27)

Sport
- Sport: Canoe sprint
Medal record
Representing Egypt
African Games
Silver medal – second place	2019 Rabat	K-2 200 m
Silver medal – second place	2019 Rabat	K-4 500 m
Bronze medal – third place	2019 Rabat	K-1 200 m
Bronze medal – third place	2019 Rabat	K-1 500 m

Samaa Ahmed (born 22 July 1998) is an Egyptian canoeist. She competed in the women's K-1 200 metres and the K-1 500 metres events at the 2020 Summer Olympics.
