= Rachel Cawthorn =

British sprint canoer

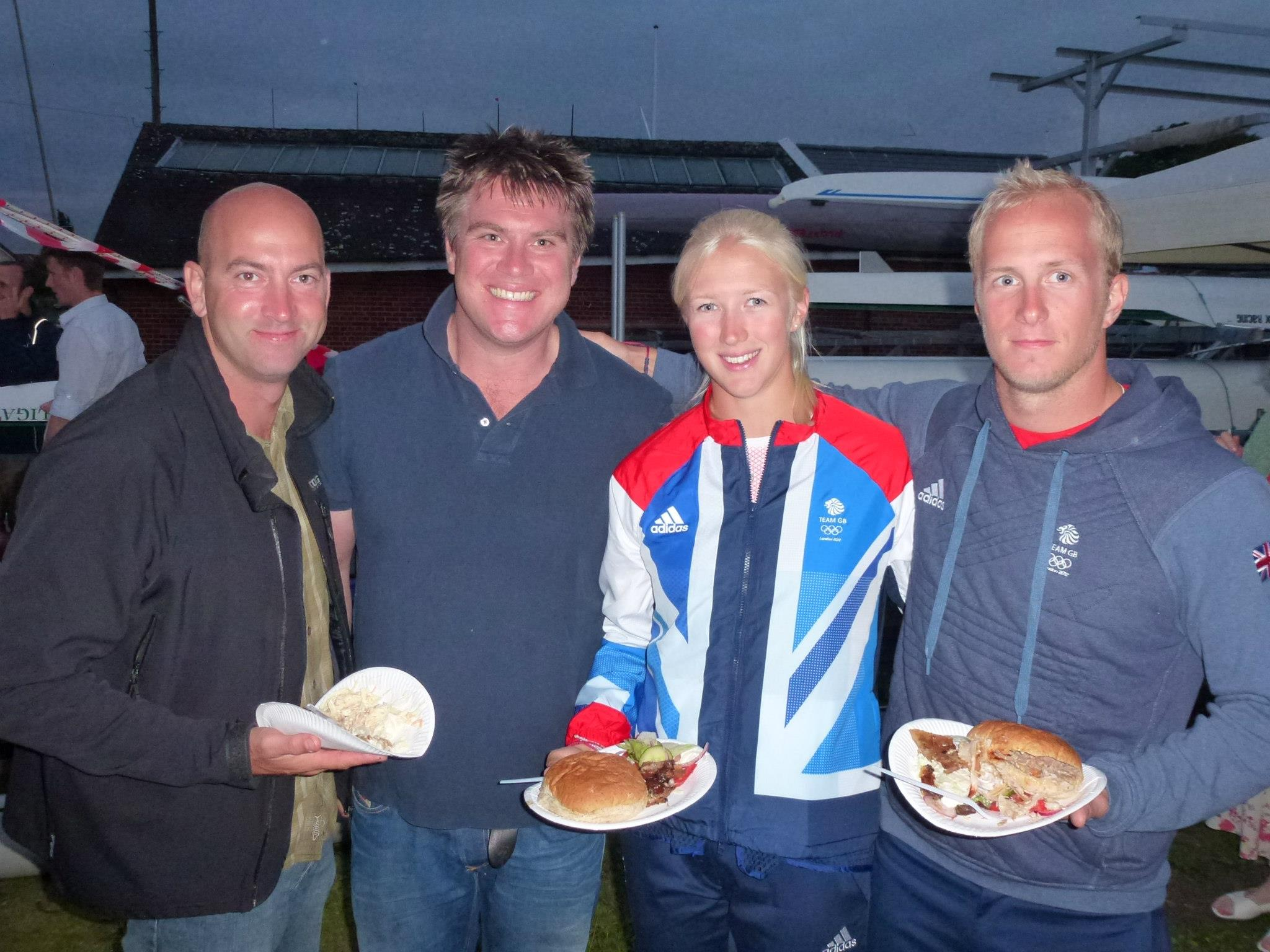

Personal information
- Born: 3 November 1988 (age 37) Guildford, Surrey
Medal record
Women's canoe sprint
Representing Great Britain
World Championships
Bronze medal – third place	2010 Poznań	K-1 500 m
Bronze medal – third place	2017 Račice	K-1 1000 m
European Championships
Gold medal – first place	2010 Trasona	K-1 1000 m
Bronze medal – third place	2009 Brandenburg	K-1 500 m
Bronze medal – third place	2009 Brandenburg	K-4 200 m
Bronze medal – third place	2010 Trasona	K-1 500 m
Bronze medal – third place	2017 Plovdiv	K-1 1000 m

Rachel Cawthorn (born 3 November 1988) is a British sprint canoer who has competed since the late 2000s. Cawthorn, representing Great Britain at the London 2012 Olympics, is a double Olympic finalist in the Women's K1 and K4 events.

== Life and career ==
Cawthorn attended Berkshire College of Agriculture.

Cawthorn won a bronze medal in the K-1 500 m event at the 2010 ICF Canoe Sprint World Championships in Poznań, the first woman from Great Britain to win a medal in an Olympic distance at an ICF Canoe Sprint World Championship.

Cawthorn holds the world's fastest time for the Women's K1 1000m. (Duisburg 2010)

At the London Olympics 2012 she came 5th in the Women's K4 500m final (competing with Louisa Sawers, Jess Walker and Angela Hannah) and came 6th in the K1 500m.

She competed in the K1 500 m and K4 500 m at the 2016 Olympics, with Louisa Gurski, Rebeka Simon and Jess Walker in the four. The four finished in 7th in their final.

In 2017, she won a bronze in the K-1 1000 m at the 2017 World Championships.
