= Marina Toribiong =

Palauan canoeist

Personal information
- Born: 13 June 1994 (age 32)

Sport
- Sport: Canoe sprint

Marina Rebeka Toribiong (born 13 June 1994) is a Palauan canoeist. She competed in the women's K-1 200 metres event at the 2016 Summer Olympics where she ranked 6th in the heat round and 8th in the semifinals. She did not advance to the final. Toribiong also competed in the K-1 500 metres event where she finished in 7th place in the heat round. She did not advance to the semifinals.
