= Amira Kheris =

Algerian canoeist

Personal information
- Born: 25 January 1999 (age 27)

Sport
- Sport: Canoe sprint

Amira Kheris (born 25 January 1999) is an Algerian canoeist. She competed in the women's K-1 200 metres, and the K-1 500 metres events at the 2020 Summer Olympics.
