= Alyce Wood =

Australian canoeist

Personal information
- Nationality: Australian
- Born: 11 August 1992 (age 33) Sunshine Coast, Queensland
- Height: 182 cm (6 ft 0 in)
- Weight: 71 kg (157 lb)
- Website: alycewood.com.au

Sport
- Country: Australia
- Sport: Canoe sprint
- Event: K1, K2

Achievements and titles
- Olympic finals: 8th K2 500 Rio Olympic Games, 5th K2 500 Tokyo Olympic Games, 8th K1 500 Tokyo Olympic Games
- Highest world ranking: 1st K1 1000m 2017 World Championships
Medal record
Women's canoe sprint
Representing Australia
World Championships
Gold medal – first place	2017 Račice	K-1 1000 m

Alyce Wood (née Burnett, born 11 August 1992) is an Australian canoeist. She competed in the women's K-2 500 metres event at the 2016 Summer Olympics and in the women's K2 500 metres and women's K1 500 metres at the 2020 Summer Olympics. In 2017 she won her maiden World Championship title in the K1 1000m. She has also won a string of World Cup medals. In the Under 23 Category she won two Bronze Medals at the World Championships (2014: K1 500 & 2015: K2 500).

At the Tokyo 2020 Olympics Wood competed with K-2 partner Alyssa Bull. They then made the A-Final of the K-2 500m by finishing second in their semi-final. In the final they came fifth and finished with a time of 1min 37.412sec, just 0.545sec from a podium finish. This was an improvement from their 8th place at the 2016 Summer Olympics in the same event.

Wood also made the final of the women's K-1 500m at the 2020 Olympics and finished in eighth place.

== Personal ==
Wood (née Burnett) grew up on the Sunshine Coast. She moved to the Gold Coast in 2013 to train at the Australian Institute of Sport, but still has close ties with the Sunshine Coast, racing for Sunshine Coast Paddle Sport Club in the Kayak and Maroochydore Surf Life Saving Club on the Ski. Wood's Husband is Jordan Wood, who is also an Olympic and World Champion Kayaker. They got married in October 2019.

== Work ==
Wood has completed both a Bachelor of Communication and a Master of Business Administration through Griffith University. She now runs a digital marketing business which specialises in implementing successful marketing strategies for small businesses.
