= Francesca Genzo =

Italian canoeist (born 1993)

Personal information
- Born: 9 September 1993 (age 32) Trieste, Italy

Sport
- Sport: Canoe sprint
Medal record
Women's canoe sprint
Representing Italy
World Championships
Silver medal – second place	2017 Račice	K-2 200 m

Francesca Genzo (born 9 September 1993) is an Italian canoeist. She competed in the women's K-1 200 metres and the K-1 500 metres events at the 2020 Summer Olympics.
