= Khaoula Sassi =

Tunisian canoeist (born 1998)

Personal information
- Born: 15 March 1998 (age 28) Sousse, Tunisia

Sport
- Sport: Canoe sprint
Medal record
Women's canoe sprint
Representing Tunisia
African Games
Silver medal – second place	2019 Rabat	K-1 200 m
Silver medal – second place	2019 Rabat	K-1 500 m
Silver medal – second place	2019 Rabat	K-2 500 m

Khaoula Sassi (born 15 March 1998) is a Tunisian canoeist. She competed in the women's K-1 200 metres and the K-2 500 metres events at the 2020 Summer Olympics.
