= Anne Cairns =

New Zealand-Samoan canoeist

Personal information
- Born: 11 January 1981 (age 45) Palmerston North, New Zealand
- Height: 1.70 m (5 ft 7 in)

Sport
- Country: Samoa
- Sport: Canoeing
- Events: Women's K-1 200 metres Women's K-1 500 metres

Anne Cairns (born 11 January 1981) is a New Zealand-Samoan canoeist, who represented Samoa at the 2016 Summer Olympics, and 2020 Summer Olympics.

== Personal life ==
Cairns lives in Palmerston North, where she attended Palmerston North Girls' High School, and is a firefighter.

== Canoeing career ==
Cairns originally represented New Zealand, and attempted to qualify for the 2008 Summer Olympics in the K1 and K4 boats.

Cairns competed in the K1 200 and 500 metre races at the 2016 Summer Olympics, finishing last in both of her heats.

She competed at the 2020 Summer Olympics, in Women's K-1 200 m, and Women's K-1 500 m.
