= Teresa Portela (Spanish canoeist) =

Spanish canoeist

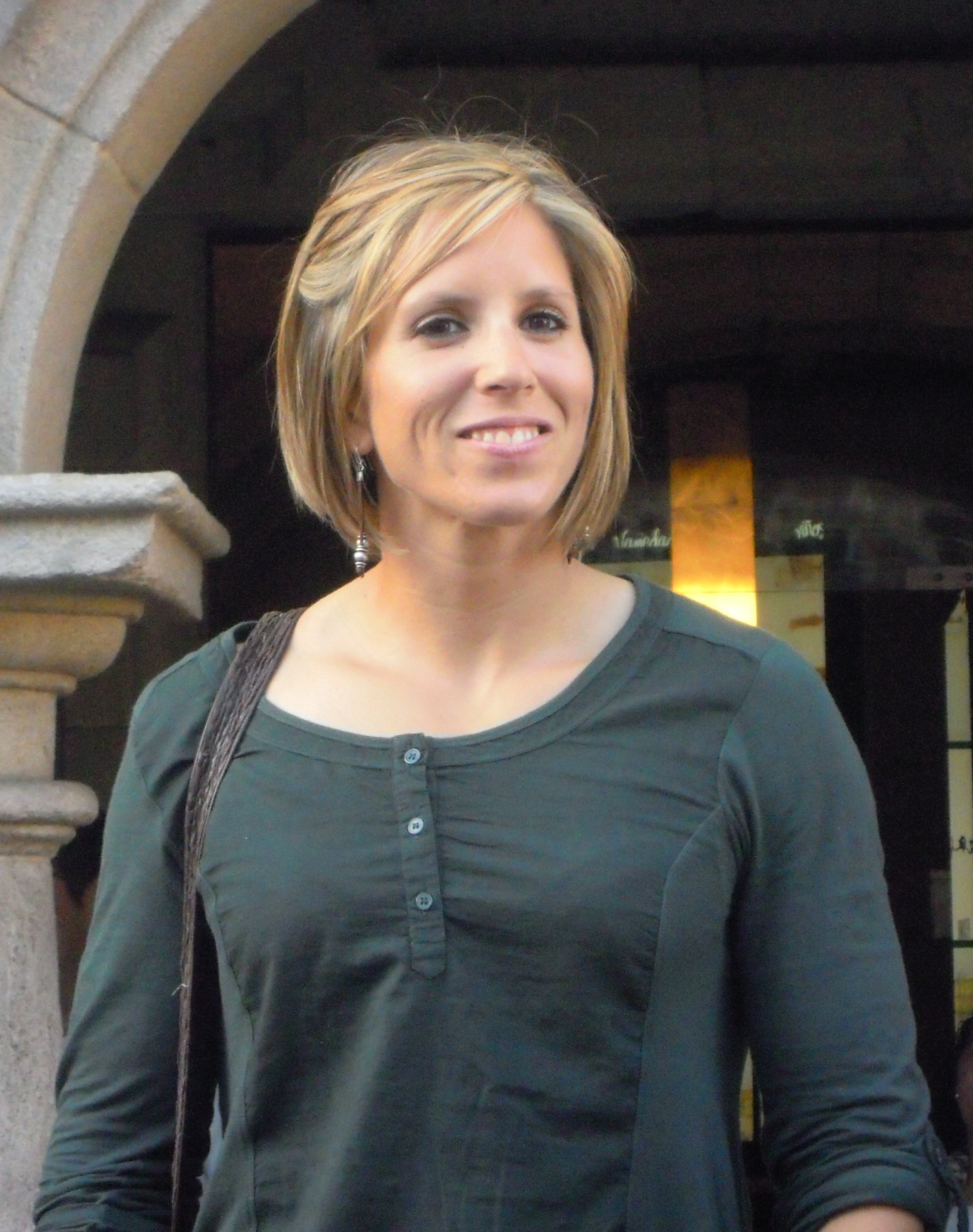
- Portela in 2012

Personal information
- Full name: María Teresa Portela Rivas
- Nationality: Spanish
- Born: 5 May 1982 (age 44) Cangas, Spain
- Height: 172 cm (5 ft 8 in)
- Weight: 69 kg (152 lb)

Sport
- Country: Spain
- Sport: Sprint kayak
- Event(s): K-1 200 m, K-2 200 m, K–4 200 m, K-4 500 m
Medal record
Women's canoe sprint
Representing Spain
Olympic Games
| Silver medal – second place | 2020 Tokyo | K-1 200 m |
World Championships
| Gold medal – first place | 2002 Seville | K-1 200 m |
| Gold medal – first place | 2005 Zagreb | K-1 200 m |
| Silver medal – second place | 2001 Poznań | K-4 200 m |
| Silver medal – second place | 2002 Seville | K-4 200 m |
| Silver medal – second place | 2003 Gainesville | K-1 200 m |
| Silver medal – second place | 2003 Gainesville | K-2 200 m |
| Silver medal – second place | 2003 Gainesville | K-4 200 m |
| Silver medal – second place | 2005 Zagreb | K-2 200 m |
| Silver medal – second place | 2022 Dartmouth | K-2 200 m |
| Bronze medal – third place | 2001 Poznań | K-4 500 m |
| Bronze medal – third place | 2002 Seville | K-4 500 m |
| Bronze medal – third place | 2003 Gainesville | K-4 500 m |
| Bronze medal – third place | 2005 Zagreb | K-4 200 m |
| Bronze medal – third place | 2009 Dartmouth | K-4 200 m |
| Bronze medal – third place | 2009 Dartmouth | K-4 500 m |
| Bronze medal – third place | 2015 Milan | K-1 200 m |
| Bronze medal – third place | 2019 Szeged | K-1 200 m |
| Bronze medal – third place | 2023 Duisburg | K-4 500 m |
European Championships
| Gold medal – first place | 2002 Szeged | K-1 200 m |
| Gold medal – first place | 2002 Szeged | K-4 200 m |
| Gold medal – first place | 2004 Poznań | K-1 200 m |
| Gold medal – first place | 2004 Poznań | K-2 200 m |
| Gold medal – first place | 2004 Poznań | K-4 200 m |
| Gold medal – first place | 2006 Račice | K-1 200 m |
| Gold medal – first place | 2009 Brandenburg | K-1 200 m |
| Silver medal – second place | 2001 Milan | K-4 200 m |
| Silver medal – second place | 2002 Szeged | K-4 500 m |
| Silver medal – second place | 2011 Belgrade | K-1 200 m |
| Silver medal – second place | 2013 Montemor-o-Velho | K-1 200 m |
| Bronze medal – third place | 2001 Milan | K-4 500 m |
| Bronze medal – third place | 2004 Poznań | K-2 500 m |
| Bronze medal – third place | 2004 Poznań | K-4 500 m |
| Bronze medal – third place | 2008 Milan | K-4 500 m |
| Bronze medal – third place | 2010 Trasona | K-1 200 m |
| Bronze medal – third place | 2010 Trasona | K-4 500 m |
Mediterranean Games
| Gold medal – first place | 2018 Taragona | K-1 200 m |
| Silver medal – second place | 2005 Almeria | K-1 500 m |
| Silver medal – second place | 2009 Pescara | K-1 500 m |

María Teresa Portela Rivas (born 5 May 1982) is a Spanish sprint canoer who has competed since the early 2000s. Portela competed in seven Summer Olympics, earning a silver medal on her sixth games at the 2020 Summer Olympics in Women's K-1 200 m. Previously she finished fourth on one occasion (2012 Summer Olympics: Women's K-1 200 m) and fifth on three occasions (2004: K-2 500 m, K-4 500 m; 2008: K-4 500 m).

She won 15 medals at the ICF Canoe Sprint World Championships with 2 golds (K-1 200 m: 2002, 2005), 6 silvers (K-1 200 m: 2003, K-2 200 m: 2003, 2005; K-4 200 m: 2001, 2002, 2003) and 7 bronzes (K-4 200 m: 2005, K-4 500 m: 2001, 2002, 2003, 2009, K-1 200 m: 2015, 2019).
