= Lasma Liepa =

Latvian-born Turkish sprint kayaker (born 1988)

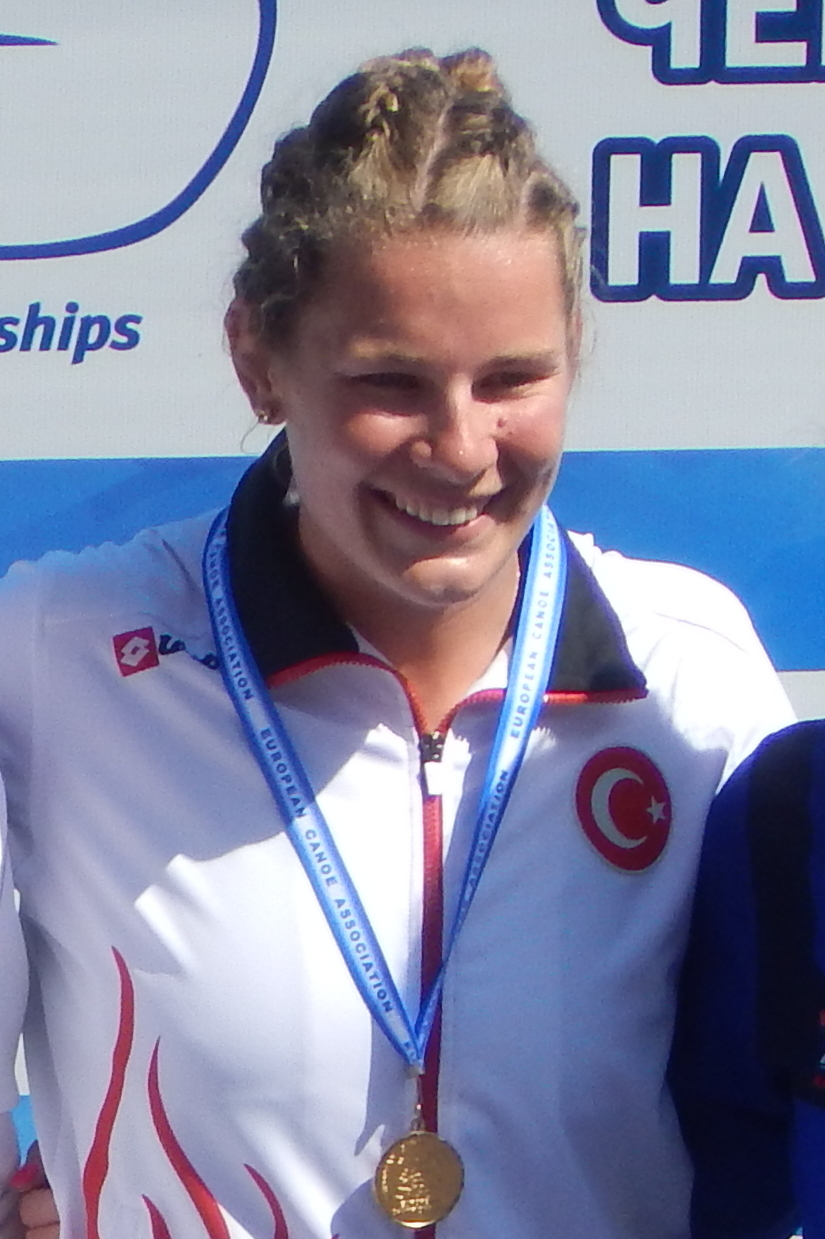
- Liepa in 2016

Personal information
- Nationality: Turkish
- Born: 4 July 1988 (age 37) Riga, Latvia
- Height: 180 cm (5 ft 11 in)
- Weight: 77 kg (170 lb)

Sport
- Sport: Kayaking
- Event: K-1 200m
- Club: Antalya Gençlik Merkezi GSK

Lasma Liepa (Latvian: Lāsma Liepa; born 4 July 1988) is a Latvian-born Turkish sprint kayaker. She is a member of Antalya Gençlik Merkezi GSK in Antalya.

In 2015, she received the Turkish citizenship, and was admitted to the Turkey national canoe team. According to the Turkish Canoe Federation, the main factor for Liepa's transfer to Turkey was supposedly her age seen by the Latvian sports officials not suitable anymore for canoeing.

She took part at the 2015 ICF Canoe Sprint World Championships in Milan, Italy, and finished 12th. Upon this result, she earned a quota spot for the women's K-1 200 m event at the 2016 Summer Olympics. She is the first ever women's canoeist to represent Turkey at the Olympics.
