= Anja Osterman =

Slovenian canoeist (born 1993)

Anja Apollonio
- 2021

Personal information
- Born: Anja Osterman; 27 January 1993 (age 33) Ankaran, Slovenia
- Spouse: Alan Apollonio (m. 2025)

Sport
- Country: Slovenia
- Sport: Sprint kayak
- Event: K–2 200 m
Medal record
Women's canoe sprint
Representing Slovenia
World Championships
Silver medal – second place	2019 Szeged	K-2 200 m
Silver medal – second place	2022 Dartmouth	K-1 200 m
Silver medal – second place	2025 Milan	K-1 200 m
Bronze medal – third place	2017 Račice	K-2 500 m
Bronze medal – third place	2019 Szeged	K-2 500 m
Bronze medal – third place	2024 Samarkand	K-4 Mix 500 m
European Championships
Gold medal – first place	2021 Poznań	K-2 200 m
Silver medal – second place	2017 Plovdiv	K-2 500 m
Silver medal – second place	2022 Munich	K-1 200 m
Silver medal – second place	2024 Szeged	K-2 200 m
Silver medal – second place	2025 Račice	K-1 200 m
Bronze medal – third place	2022 Munich	K-1 500 m
Mediterranean Games
Bronze medal – third place	2018 Taragona	K-1 500 m

Anja Apollonio (née Osterman, born 27 January 1993) is a Slovenian sprint canoeist.

She won a medal at the 2019 ICF Canoe Sprint World Championships.
