= Marta Walczykiewicz =

Polish canoeist

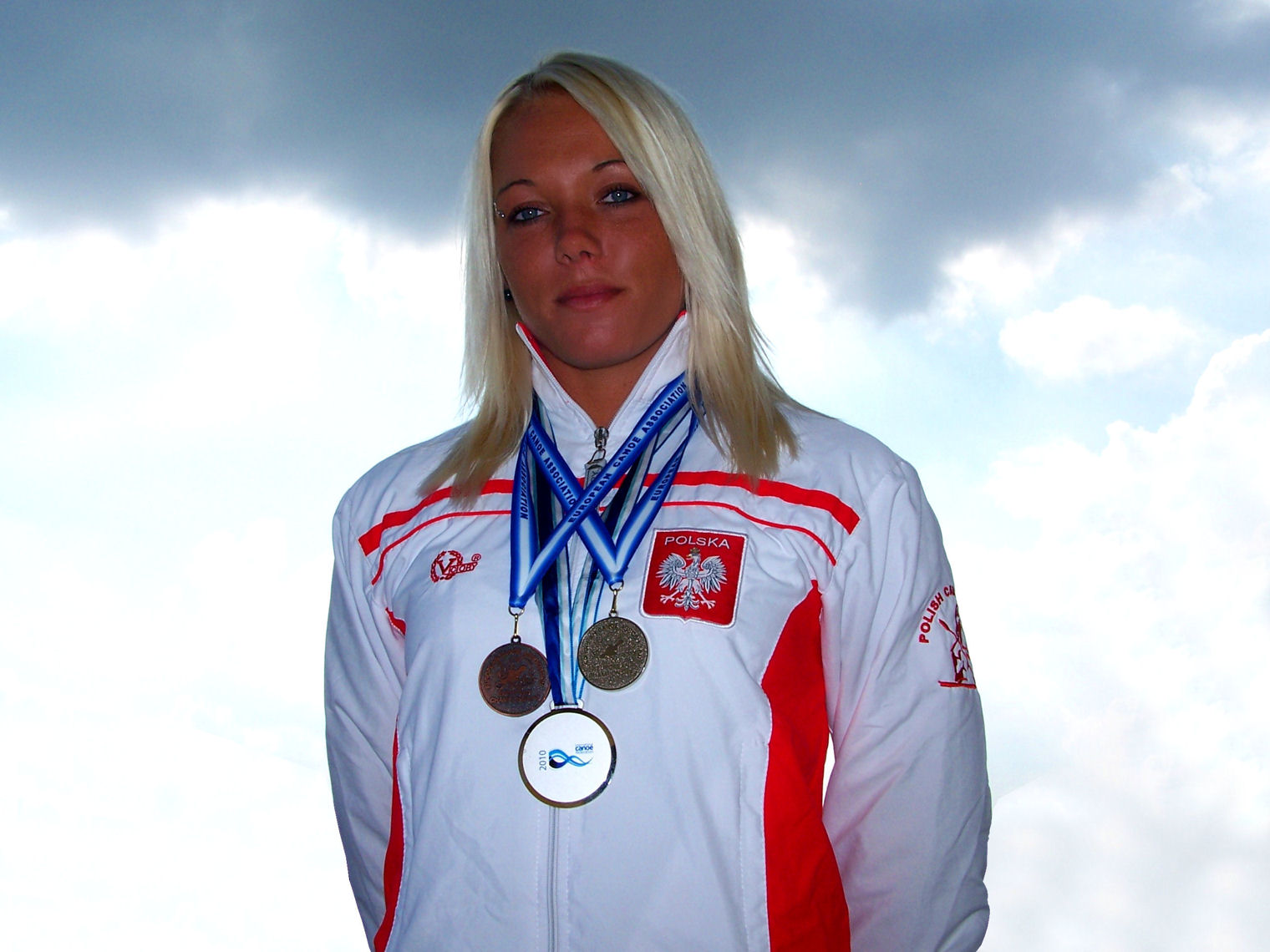

Personal information
- Nationality: Polish
- Born: 1 August 1987 (age 38) Kalisz, Poland
- Height: 1.65 m (5 ft 5 in)
- Weight: 64 kg (141 lb)

Sport
- Country: Poland
- Sport: Sprint kayak
- Club: KTW Kalisz
Medal record
Women's Sprint kayak
Representing Poland
Event	1st	2nd	3rd
Olympic Games	0	1	0
World Championships	1	9	3
European Championships	2	5	4
European Games	1	0	1
Total	4	15	8
Olympic Games
Silver medal – second place	2016 Rio de Janeiro	K-1 200 m
World Championships
Gold medal – first place	2014 Moscow	K-1 4×200 m
Silver medal – second place	2009 Dartmouth	K-1 200 m
Silver medal – second place	2010 Poznań	K-2 200 m
Silver medal – second place	2011 Szeged	K-1 200 m
Silver medal – second place	2013 Duisburg	K-1 200 m
Silver medal – second place	2013 Duisburg	K–1 4×200 m
Silver medal – second place	2014 Moscow	K-1 200 m
Silver medal – second place	2014 Moscow	K-4 500 m
Silver medal – second place	2015 Milan	K-1 200 m
Silver medal – second place	2019 Szeged	K-1 200 m
Bronze medal – third place	2007 Duisburg	K-2 200 m
Bronze medal – third place	2011 Szeged	K-1 4×200 m
Bronze medal – third place	2021 Copenhagen	K-2 Mix 200 m
European Games
Gold medal – first place	2015 Baku	K-1 200 m
Bronze medal – third place	2019 Minsk	K-1 200 m
European Championships
Gold medal – first place	2013 Montemor-o-Velho	K-1 200 m
Gold medal – first place	2018 Belgrade	K-1 200 m
Silver medal – second place	2008 Milan	K-2 200 m
Silver medal – second place	2008 Milan	K-2 1000 m
Silver medal – second place	2010 Trasona	K-1 200 m
Silver medal – second place	2012 Zagreb	K-1 200 m
Silver medal – second place	2014 Brandenburg	K-4 500 m
Bronze medal – third place	2009 Brandenburg	K-4 500 m
Bronze medal – third place	2010 Trasona	K-2 500 m
Bronze medal – third place	2021 Poznań	K-1 200 m
Bronze medal – third place	2022 Munich	K-1 200 m

Marta Anna Walczykiewicz (Polish pronunciation: [ˈmarta valt͡ʂɨˈkjɛvit͡ʂ]; born 1 August 1987) is a Polish sprint canoeist who has competed since the late 2000s. She won eleven medals at the ICF Canoe Sprint World Championships with one gold (K-1 4 x 200 m: 2014), eight silvers (K-1 200 m: 2009, 2011, 2013, 2014, 2015; K-2 200 m: 2010, K-1 200 m relay: 2013, K-4 500 m: 2014) and a bronze (K-2 200 m: 2007).

== Career ==
At the 2015 European Games Walczykiewicz won Poland's first gold medal in the K-1 200 m event. In June 2015, she competed in the inaugural European Games, for Poland in canoe sprint, and won a gold medal in the K-1 200m.

She competed for Poland at the 2016 Summer Olympics in the women's K-1 200 metres and the women's K-4 500 metres. She won the silver medal in the women's K-1 200 m event. Her team in the women's K-4 500 m event finished in 9th place. Walczykiewicz was the flag bearer for Poland during the closing ceremony. She also competed at the 2012 Summer Olympics.
