= Canoeing at the 2010 Summer Youth Olympics – Girls' K1 slalom =

These are the results of the girls' K1 slalom at the 2010 Summer Youth Olympics. It took place at the Marina Reservoir. Time Trial Round was on August 24, 2010. First elimination round, repechage and third round took place on August 24, and quarterfinals, semifinals and medals rounds were on August 25.

== Medalists ==
Gold	Jessica Fox; Australia
Silver	Pavlina Zasterova; Czech Republic
Bronze	Viktoria Wolffhardt; Austria

== Time Trial ==
Rank	Athlete	Time
1	Jessica Fox (AUS)	1:34.23
2	Ajda Novak (SLO)	1:37.86
3	Viktoria Wolffhardt (AUT)	1:39.13
4	Pavlina Zasterova (CZE)	1:39.39
5	Jazmiyne Denhollander (CAN)	1:41.03
6	Nathalie Grewelding (GER)	1:42.66
7	Manon Hostens (FRA)	1:44.28
8	Nan Feng Wang (SIN)	1:45.09
9	Hermien Peters (BEL)	1:48.36
10	Ben Ismail Afef (TUN)	1:52.33
11	Mariya Kichasova (UKR)	1:53.59
12	Ida Villumsen (DEN)	1:56.17
13	Natalia Podolskaya (RUS)	1:57.33
14	Christina Emma Blake Perdoso (POR)	1:57.34
15	Maria Elena Monleon (ESP)	1:58.49
16	Huang Jieyi (CHN)	1:58.52
17	Aliaksandra Hryshyna (BLR)	1:59.57
18	Joanna Bruska (POL)	1:59.92
19	Ramona Farkasdi (HUN)	2:03.19
20	Kerry Segal (RSA)	2:03.42
21	Kawtar Rimi (MAR)	2:06.27
22	Valentina Barrera (ARG)	2:08.59
23	Genanilze Almeida Soares (STP)	2:11.99

== First round ==
The winners and the fastest loser advanced to the 3rd round. Losers raced at the repechages.

Match 1

Name	Time
Ajda Novak (SLO)	1:39.14
Henanilze Almeida Soares (STP)	2:11.50

Match 2

Name	Time
Viktoria Wolffhardt (AUT)	1:37.12
Valentina Barrera (ARG)	2:07.59

Match 3

Name	Time
Pavlina Zasterova (CZE)	1:38.05
Kawtar Rimi (MAR)	2:09.79

Match 4

Name	Time
Jazmyne Denhollander (CAN)	1:43.47
Kerry Segal (RSA)	2:01.86

Match 5

Name	Time
Nathalie Grewelding (GER)	1:41.60
Ramona Farkasdi (HUN)	2:04.21

Match 6

Name	Time
Manon Hostens (FRA)	1:41.33
Joanna Bruska (POL)	2:05.31

Match 7

Name	Time
Nan Feng Wang (SIN)	1:47.23
Aliaksandra Hryshyna (BLR)	1:58.30

Match 8

Name	Time
Hermien Peters (BEL)	1:46.14
Huang Jieyi (CHN)	2:05.78

Match 9

Name	Time
Ben Ismail Afef (TUN)	1:51.48
Maria Elena Monleon (ESP)	2:00.27

Match 10

Name	Time
Mariya Kichasova (UKR)	1:48.71
Christina Emma Blake Perdoso (POR)	1:53.90

Match 11

Name	Time
Natalia Podolskaya (RUS)	1:52.23
Ida Villumsen (DEN)	2:00.81

== Repechage ==
The fastest 3 boats advanced to the 3rd round.

Repechage 1

Name	Time
Aliaksandra Hryshyna (BLR)	1:54.01
Genanilze Almeida Soares (STP)	2:40.07

Repechage 2

Name	Time
Maria Elena Monleon (ESP)	1:57.60
Kawtar Rimi (MAR)	2:05.77

Repechage 3

Name	Time
Ida Villumsen (DEN)	1:53.86
Valentina Barrera (ARG)	2:04.45

Repechage 4

Name	Time
Huang Jieyi (CHN)	1:58.94
Kerry Segal (RSA)	1:59.67

Repechage 5

Name	Time
Joanna Bruska (POL)	1:53.93
Ramona Farkasdi (HUN)	2:00.08

== Third round ==
The winners advanced to the 4th round.

Match 1

Name	Time
Jessica Fox (AUS)	1:37.10
Aliaksandra Hryshyna (BLR)	2:01.26

Match 2

Name	Time
Viktoria Wolffhardt (AUT)	1:38.89
Joanna Bruska (POL)	2:02.09

Match 3

Name	Time
Pavlina Zasterova (CZE)	1:39.88
Christina Emma Blake Perdoso (POR)	1:54.18

Match 4

Name	Time
Ajda Novak (SLO)	1:38.23
Ida Villumsen (DEN)	1:54.23

Match 5

Name	Time
Manon Hostens (FRA)	1:45.35
Natalia Podolskaya (KAZ)	1:56.18

Match 6

Name	Time
Nathalia Grewelding (GER)	1:44.47
Ben Ismail Afef (TUN)	2:00.26

Match 7

Name	Time
Jazmyne Denhollander (CAN)	1:42.85
Mariya Kichasova (UKR)	1:48.55

Match 8

Name	Time
Hermien Peters (BEL)	1:46.85
Nan Fend Wang (SIN)	1:51.87

== Quarterfinals ==
Match 1

Name	Time
Jessica Fox (AUS)	1:34.62
Hermien Peters (BEL)	1:46.52

Match 2

Name	Time
Ajda Novak (SLO)	1:39.54
Manon Hostens (FRA)	1:46.83

Match 3

Name	Time
Viktoria Wolffhardt (AUT)	1:39.00
Nathalia Grewelding (GER)	1:43.94

Match 4

Name	Time
Pavlina Zasterova (CZE)	1:37.31
Jazmyne Denhollander (CAN)	1:43.05

== Semifinals ==
Match 1

Name	Time
Jessica Fox (AUS)	1:37.30
Ajda Novak (SLO)	1:45.06

Match 2

Name	Time
Pavlina Zasterova (CZE)	1:37.02
Viktoria Wolffhardt (AUT)	1:38.23

== Finals ==
Match 1

Rank	Name	Time
1st place, gold medalist(s)	Jessica Fox (AUS)	1:33.64
2nd place, silver medalist(s)	Pavlina Zasterova (CZE)	1:40.79

Match 2

Rank	Name	Time
3rd place, bronze medalist(s)	Viktoria Wolffhardt (AUT)	1:37.43
4	Ajda Novak (SLO)	1:37.44
