= Canoeing at the 2010 Summer Youth Olympics – Girls' K1 sprint =

These are the results of the Girls' K1 Sprint at the 2010 Summer Youth Olympics. It took place at the Marina Reservoir. Time Trial Round was on August 21, 2010. First elimination round, repechage and third round took place on August 21, and quarterfinals, semifinals and medals rounds were on August 22.

== Medalists ==
Gold	Ramona Farkasdi; Hungary
Silver	Jieyi Huang; China
Bronze	Hermien Peters; Belgium

== Time Trial ==
Rank	Athlete	Time
1	Ramona Farkasdi (HUN)	1:40.64
2	Natalia Podolskya (RUS)	1:41.65
3	Jieyi Huang (CHN)	1:41.49
4	Hermien Peters (BEL)	1:42.67
5	Joanna Bruska (POL)	1:43.43
6	Aliaksandra Hryshyna (BLR)	1:44.46
7	Maria Elena Monleon (ESP)	1:44.69
8	Jessica Fox (AUS)	1:46.15
9	Mariya Kichasova (UKR)	1:46.77
10	Christina Emma Blake Pedroso (POR)	1:46.79
11	Kerry Segal (RSA)	1:47.11
12	Ida Villumsen (DEN)	1:47.22
13	Nan Feng Wang (SIN)	1:49.96
14	Manon Hostens (FRA)	1:50.08
15	Ajda Novak (SLO)	1:52.10
16	Valentina Barrera (ARG)	1:58.04
17	Ben Ismail Afef (TUN)	1:59.48
18	Pavlina Zasterova (CZE)	2:02.12
19	Genanilze Almeida Soares (STP)	2:13.88
20	Jazmyne Denhollander (CAN)	2:59.49
	Viktoria Wolffhardt (AUT)	DNF
	Kawtar Rimi (MAR)	DNF
	Beatriz Soares da Gama (GBS)	DNS
	Nathalie Grewelding (GER)	DNS

== First round ==
The winners advanced to the 3rd round. Losers raced at the repechages.

Match 1

Name	Time
Ramona Farkasdi (HUN)	1:40.17
Jazmyne Denhollander (CAN)	2:21.85

Match 2

Name	Time
Natalia Podolskaya (RUS)	1:41.22
Genanilze Almeida Soares (STP)	2:19.89

Match 3

Name	Time
Jieyi Huang (CHN)	1:42.66
Pavlina Zasterova (CZE)	2:00.73

Match 4

Name	Time
Hermien Peters (BEL)	1:44.99
Ben Ismail Afef (TUN)	2:02.07

Match 5

Name	Time
Joanna Bruska (POL)	1:43.12
Valentina Barrera (ARG)	1:59.02

Match 6

Name	Time
Aliaksandra Hryshyna (BLR)	1:46.21
Ajda Novak (SLO)	1:51.89

Match 7

Name	Time
Maria Elena Monleon (ESP)	1:44.69
Manon Hostens (FRA)	1:49.59

Match 8

Name	Time
Jessica Fox (AUS)	1:46.54
Nan Feng Wang (SIN)	1:50.14

Match 9

Name	Time
Mariya Kichasova (UKR)	1:46.75
Ida Villumsen (DEN)	1:48.65

Match 10

Name	Time
Kerry Segal (RSA)	1:45.66
Christina Emma Blake Pedroso (POR)	1:47.64

== Repechage ==
The fastest 6 boats advanced to the 3rd round.

Repechage 1

Name	Time
Christina Emma Blake Pedroso (POR)	1:46.65
Jazmyne Denhollander (CAN)	2:15.21

Repechage 2

Name	Time
Ida Villumsen (DEN)	1:47.31
Genanilze Almeida Soares (STP)	2:15.21

Repechage 3

Name	Time
Manon Hostens (FRA)	1:49.82
Ben Ismail Afef (TUN)	1:57.33

Repechage 4

Name	Time
Nan Feng Wang (SIN)	1:49.20
Pavlina Zasterova (CZE)	2:00.02

Repechage 5

Name	Time
Ajda Novak (SLO)	1:51.34
Valentina Barrera (ARG)	1:57.94

== Third round ==
The winners advanced to the quarterfinals.

Match 1

Name	Time
Ramona Farkasdi (HUN)	1:39.65
Ben Ismail Afef (TUN)	2:04.25

Match 2

Name	Time
Natalia Podolskaya (RUS)	1:41.85
Ajda Novak (SLO)	1:54.22

Match 3

Name	Time
Jieyi Huang (CHN)	1:42.78
Manon Hostens (FRA)	1:51.32

Match 4

Name	Time
Joanna Bruska (POL)	1:43.21
Nan Feng Wang (SIN)	1:53.13

Match 5

Name	Time
Maria Elena Monleon (ESP)	1:45.95
Ida Villumsen (DEN)	1:48.40

Match 6

Name	Time
Hermien Peters (BEL)	1:43.27
Mariya Kichasova (UKR)	1:46.00

Match 7

Name	Time
Kerry Segal (RSA)	1:46.38
Christina Emma Blake Pedroso (POR)	1:48.35

Match 8

Name	Time
Aliaksandra Hryshyna (BLR)	1:45.27
Jessica Fox (AUS)	1:46.60

== Quarterfinals ==
The winners advanced to the semifinals.

Match 1

Name	Time
Ramona Farkasdi (HUN)	1:44.14
Kerry Segal (RSA)	1:52.97

Match 2

Name	Time
Maria Elena Monleon (ESP)	1:46.35
Natalia Podolskaya (RUS)	DNF

Match 3

Name	Time
Jieyi Huang (CHN)	1:42.71
Aliaksandra Hryshyna (BLR)	1:45.94

Match 4

Name	Time
Hermien Peters (BEL)	1:44.52
Joanna Bruska (POL)	1:44.58

== Semifinals ==
The winners advanced to the finals, losers advanced to the bronze medal match.

Match 1

Name	Time
Jieyi Huang (CHN)	1:43.78
Maria Elena Monleon (ESP)	1:50.50

Match 2

Name	Time
Ramona Farkasdi (HUN)	1:41.42
Hermien Peters (BEL)	1:53.49

== Finals ==
Gold Medal Match

Rank	Name	Time
1st place, gold medalist(s)	Ramona Farkasdi (HUN)	1:41.26
2nd place, silver medalist(s)	Jieyi Huang (CHN)	1:44.73

Bronze Medal Match

Rank	Name	Time
3rd place, bronze medalist(s)	Hermien Peters (BEL)	1:46.76
4	Maria Elena Monleon (ESP)	1:49.11
