= 2017 ICF Canoe Sprint World Championships – Women's K-2 200 metres =

Women's K-2 200 metres at the 2017 ICF Canoe Sprint World Championships
- Venue: Sportcentrum Račice
- Location: Račice, Czech Republic
- Dates: 25–27 August
- Competitors: 30 from 15 nations
- Winning time: 37.445

Medalists
gold medal	Réka Hagymási; Ágnes Szabó	Hungary
silver medal	Susanna Cicali; Francesca Genzo	Italy
bronze medal	Angela Hannah; Hannah Brown	Great Britain

The women's K-2 200 metres competition at the 2017 ICF Canoe Sprint World Championships in Račice took place at the Sportcentrum Račice.

== Schedule ==
The schedule was as follows:

Date	Time	Round
Friday 25 August 2017	10:53	Heats
Saturday 26 August 2017	16:39	Semifinal
Sunday 27 August 2017	11:14	Final

All times are Central European Summer Time (UTC+2)

== Results ==
=== Heats ===
The fastest three boats in each heat advanced directly to the final. The next four fastest boats in each heat, plus the fastest remaining boat advanced to the semifinal.

==== Heat 1 ====
Rank	Kayakers	Country	Time	Notes
1	Nadzeya Liapeshka; Volha Khudzenka	Belarus	37.438	QF
2	Mariia Kichasova; Anastasiya Horlova	Ukraine	37.533	QF
3	Ana Roxana Lehaci; Viktoria Schwarz	Austria	38.127	QF
4	Natalia Podolskaya; Vera Sobetova	Russia	38.255	QS
5	Catherine McArthur; Jaime Roberts	Australia	38.761	QS
6	Irina Podoinikova; Zoya Ananchenko	Kazakhstan	39.272	QS
7	Michaela Fasnerová; Sofie Kinclová	Czech Republic	39.566	QS
8	Ragina Kiro; Sandhya Kispotta	India	45.605	qS

==== Heat 2 ====
Rank	Kayakers	Country	Time	Notes
1	Réka Hagymási; Ágnes Szabó	Hungary	37.403	QF
2	Susanna Cicali; Francesca Genzo	Italy	37.492	QF
3	Angela Hannah; Hannah Brown	Great Britain	38.375	QF
4	Moa Wikberg; Karin Johansson	Sweden	38.603	QS
5	Karina Alanís; Maricela Montemayor	Mexico	38.792	QS
6	Justyna Iskrzycka; Paulina Paszek	Poland	39.225	QS
7	Laura Skukauska; Sabine Cirsa	Latvia	41.608	QS

=== Semifinal ===
The fastest three boats advanced to the final.

Rank	Kayakers	Country	Time	Notes
1	Moa Wikberg; Karin Johansson	Sweden	38.523	QF
2	Natalia Podolskaya; Vera Sobetova	Russia	38.778	QF
3	Catherine McArthur; Jaime Roberts	Australia	38.817	QF
4	Karina Alanís; Maricela Montemayor	Mexico	38.873	
5	Justyna Iskrzycka; Paulina Paszek	Poland	39.095	
6	Irina Podoinikova; Zoya Ananchenko	Kazakhstan	39.206	
7	Michaela Fasnerová; Sofie Kinclová	Czech Republic	39.678	
8	Laura Skukauska; Sabine Cirsa	Latvia	41.445	
9	Ragina Kiro; Sandhya Kispotta	India	46.211	

=== Final ===
Competitors raced for positions 1 to 9, with medals going to the top three.

Rank	Kayakers	Country	Time
1st place, gold medalist(s)	Réka Hagymási; Ágnes Szabó	Hungary	37.445
2nd place, silver medalist(s)	Susanna Cicali; Francesca Genzo	Italy	37.508
3rd place, bronze medalist(s)	Angela Hannah; Hannah Brown	Great Britain	37.993
4	Natalia Podolskaya; Vera Sobetova	Russia	38.135
5	Nadzeya Liapeshka; Volha Khudzenka	Belarus	38.240
6	Ana Roxana Lehaci; Viktoria Schwarz	Austria	38.366
7	Moa Wikberg; Karin Johansson	Sweden	38.650
8	Catherine McArthur; Jaime Roberts	Australia	39.087
–	Mariia Kichasova; Anastasiya Horlova	Ukraine	DNF
