= Canoeing at the 2020 Summer Olympics – Women's K-2 500 metres =

Women's K-2 500 metres at the Games of the XXXII Olympiad
- Canoeing pictogram
- Venue: Sea Forest Waterway
- Dates: 2 August 2021 (heats and quarterfinal); 3 August 2021 (semifinal & final)
- Competitors: 40 (20 boats) from 16 nations
- Winning time: 1:35.785

Medalists
1st place, gold medalist(s)		Lisa Carrington; Caitlin Regal	New Zealand
2nd place, silver medalist(s)		Karolina Naja; Anna Puławska	Poland
3rd place, bronze medalist(s)		Danuta Kozák; Dóra Bodonyi	Hungary

The women's K-2 500 metres sprint canoeing event at the 2020 Summer Olympics took place on 2 and 3 August 2021 at the Sea Forest Waterway. At least 20 canoeists (10 boats of 2) from at least 9 nations competed.

== Background ==
This was the 16th appearance of the event, having appeared at every Summer Games since 1960.

The reigning World Champions are Maryna Litvinchuk and Volha Khudzenka of Belarus. The reigning Olympic champions are Gabriella Szabó and Danuta Kozák of Hungary.

== Qualification ==
A National Olympic Committee (NOC) could qualify one place in the event, though could enter up to 2 boats if it earned enough quota places through other women's kayak events. A total of 13 qualification places were available, initially allocated as follows:

- 6 places awarded through the 2019 ICF Canoe Sprint World Championships
- 3 places awarded to 3 different continents (excluding Europe) through the World Championships, which are then competed for at continental tournaments
- 1 places awarded through a European continental tournament

Qualifying places were awarded to the NOC, not to the individual canoeist who earned the place.

The top 6 boats used only 5 of the 12 athlete quotas; the other 7 were reallocated up to the K-4. After the K-4 reallocation process, 3 spots were reallocated down to the K-2. This was sufficient to qualify China, using 2 of those places, but Austria could not qualify through reallocation because they needed 2 places and only 1 remained. The quota was reallocated further to the K-1 500 metres.

The three continental spots were awarded to Oceania (#9 New Zealand), the Americas (#13 Canada), and Africa (#19 South Africa); Asia had the lowest next-ranked team (#20 Uzbekistan). The continental tournaments were won by Tunisia, Germany, and Australia; the Americas spot was reallocated to the general World Championships after the tournament was cancelled. The World Championships spots were allocated as follows:

Rank	Kayaker	Nation	Qualification	Selected competitors
1	Maryna Litvinchuk; Volha Khudzenka	Belarus	Both earned quotas in K-4	Could enter via K-1s or K-4
2	Karolina Naja; Anna Puławska	Poland	Both earned quotas in K-4	Could enter via K-1s or K-4
3	Špela Ponomarenko Janić; Anja Osterman	Slovenia	Quota #3 in K-2	
4	Hermien Peters; Lize Broekx	Belgium	Quota #4 in K-2	
5	Sarah Guyot; Manon Hostens	France	Both earned quotas in K-4	Could enter via K-1s or K-4
6	Mariya Povkh; Liudmyla Kuklinovska	Ukraine	Quota #6 in K-2 (one quota in K-4)	
7	Yu Shimeng; Wang Nan	China	Reallocated quotas	
8	Viktoria Schwarz; Ana Roxana Lehaci	Austria	Reallocated Americas quota in K-2	

Continental places:

Nation	Qualification	Selected competitor
Tunisia	Africa quota in K-2 500 m	
Germany	Europe quota in K-2 500 m	
Australia	Oceania quota in K-2 500 m	

Nations with women's kayak quota spots from the K-1 200 metres, K-1 500 metres, or K-4 500 metres could enter (additional) boats as well.

Nation	Selected competitors 1	Selected competitors 2
New Zealand	Lisa Carrington; Caitlin Regal (K-4)	Teneale Hatton; Alicia Hoskin (K-4)

== Competition format ==
Sprint canoeing uses a four-round format for events with at least 11 boats, with heats, quarterfinals, semifinals, and finals. The specifics of the progression format depend on the number of boats ultimately entered.

The course is a flatwater course 9 metres wide. The name of the event describes the particular format within sprint canoeing. The "K" format means a kayak, with the canoeist sitting, using a double-bladed paddle to paddle, and steering with a foot-operated rudder (as opposed to a canoe, with a kneeling canoeist, single-bladed paddle, and no rudder). The "2" is the number of canoeists in each boat. The "500 metres" is the distance of each race.

== Schedule ==
The event was held over two consecutive days, with two rounds per day. All sessions started at 9:30 a.m. local time, though there are multiple events with races in each session.

Legend
H	Heats	¼	Quarter-finals	½	Semi-finals	F	Final

Sprint
Event↓/Date →	Mon 2		Tue 3		Wed 4	Thu 5	Fri 6	Sat 7
Women's K-2 500 m	H	¼	½	F				

== Results ==
=== Heats ===
Progression System: 1st-2nd to SF, rest to QF.

==== Heat 1 ====
Rank	Lane	Canoer	Country	Time	Notes
1	6	Danuta Kozák; Dóra Bodonyi	Hungary	1:45.735	SF
2	3	Kira Stepanova; Varvara Baranova	ROC	1:47.874	SF
3	5	Ana Roxana Lehaci; Viktoria Schwarz	Austria	1:48.220	QF
4	4	Liudmyla Kuklinovska; Anastasiia Todorova	Ukraine	1:50.733	QF
5	2	Afef Ben Ismail; Khaoula Sassi	Tunisia	2:05.770	QF

==== Heat 2 ====
Rank	Lane	Canoer	Country	Time	Notes
1	5	Karolina Naja; Anna Puławska	Poland	1:44.606	SF
2	4	Manon Hostens; Sarah Guyot	France	1:45.533	SF
3	3	Li Dongyin; Zhou Yu	China	1:45.831	QF
4	2	Alicia Hoskin; Teneale Hatton	New Zealand	1:49.832	QF
5	6	Jaime Roberts; Jo Brigden-Jones	Australia	1:52.097	QF

==== Heat 3 ====
Rank	Lane	Canoer	Country	Time	Notes
1	6	Tamara Csipes; Erika Medveczky	Hungary	1:42.776	SF
2	4	Volha Khudzenka; Maryna Litvinchuk	Belarus	1:43.377	SF
3	2	Caroline Arft; Sarah Brüßler	Germany	1:48.058	QF
4	5	Špela Ponomarenko Janić; Anja Osterman	Slovenia	1:48.509	QF
5	3	Julie Funch; Bolette Nyvang Iversen	Denmark	1:52.730	QF

==== Heat 4 ====
Rank	Lane	Canoer	Country	Time	Notes
1	3	Lisa Carrington; Caitlin Regal	New Zealand	1:43.836	SF
2	4	Sabrina Hering-Pradler; Tina Dietze	Germany	1:44.894	SF
3	2	Alyssa Bull; Alyce Wood	Australia	1:45.499	QF
4	5	Hermien Peters; Lize Broekx	Belgium	1:48.137	QF
5	6	Alanna Bray-Lougheed; Madeline Schmidt	Canada	1:49.776	QF

=== Quarterfinals ===
Progression: 1st-4th to SF, rest out.

==== Quarterfinal 1 ====
Rank	Lane	Canoer	Country	Time	Notes
1	6	Hermien Peters; Lize Broekx	Belgium	1:47.649	SF
2	4	Caroline Arft; Sarah Brüßler	Germany	1:48.450	SF
3	5	Ana Roxana Lehaci; Viktoria Schwarz	Austria	1:49.777	SF
4	3	Alicia Hoskin; Teneale Hatton	New Zealand	1:50.507	SF
5	7	Julie Funch; Bolette Nyvang Iversen	Denmark	1:52.678	
6	2	Afef Ben Ismail; Khaoula Sassi	Tunisia	2:10.979	

==== Quarterfinal 2 ====
Rank	Lane	Canoer	Country	Time	Notes
1	6	Špela Ponomarenko Janić; Anja Osterman	Slovenia	1:46.929	SF
2	4	Alyssa Bull; Alyce Wood	Australia	1:47.057	SF
3	5	Li Dongyin; Zhou Yu	China	1:47.471	SF
4	2	Jaime Roberts; Jo Brigden-Jones	Australia	1:50.325	SF
5	7	Alanna Bray-Lougheed; Madeline Schmidt	Canada	1:51.862	
6	3	Liudmyla Kuklinovska; Anastasiia Todorova	Ukraine	1:53.184	

=== Semifinals ===
Progression System: 1st-4th to Final A, rest to Final B.

==== Semifinal 1 ====
Rank	Lane	Canoer	Country	Time	Notes
1	4	Danuta Kozák; Dóra Bodonyi	Hungary	1:37.912	FA
2	5	Tamara Csipes; Erika Medveczky	Hungary	1:38.446	FA
3	3	Manon Hostens; Sarah Guyot	France	1:38.632	FA
4	6	Sabrina Hering-Pradler; Tina Dietze	Germany	1:38.954	FA
5	8	Li Dongyin; Zhou Yu	China	1:39.404	FB
6	7	Caroline Arft; Sarah Brüßler	Germany	1:39.421	FB
7	1	Alicia Hoskin; Teneale Hatton	New Zealand	1:44.119	FB
8	2	Špela Ponomarenko Janić; Anja Osterman	Slovenia	DNF	

==== Semifinal 2 ====
Rank	Lane	Canoer	Country	Time	Notes
1	5	Lisa Carrington; Caitlin Regal	New Zealand	1:36.724	OB, FA
2	7	Alyssa Bull; Alyce Wood	Australia	1:37.109	FA
3	6	Volha Khudzenka; Maryna Litvinchuk	Belarus	1:37.198	FA
4	4	Karolina Naja; Anna Puławska	Poland	1:37.219	FA
5	2	Hermien Peters; Lize Broekx	Belgium	1:39.046	FB
6	8	Ana Roxana Lehaci; Viktoria Schwarz	Austria	1:39.497	FB
7	3	Kira Stepanova; Varvara Baranova	ROC	1:42.069	FB
8	1	Jaime Roberts; Jo Brigden-Jones	Australia	1:42.092	FB

=== Finals ===
==== Final A ====
Rank	Lane	Canoer	Country	Time	Notes
1st place, gold medalist(s)	4	Lisa Carrington; Caitlin Regal	New Zealand	1:35.785	OB
2nd place, silver medalist(s)	8	Karolina Naja; Anna Puławska	Poland	1:36.753	
3rd place, bronze medalist(s)	5	Danuta Kozák; Dóra Bodonyi	Hungary	1:36.867	
4	3	Tamara Csipes; Erika Medveczky	Hungary	1:37.114	
5	6	Alyssa Bull; Alyce Wood	Australia	1:37.412	
6	2	Volha Khudzenka; Maryna Litvinchuk	Belarus	1:37.647	
7	7	Manon Hostens; Sarah Guyot	France	1:40.329	
8	1	Sabrina Hering-Pradler; Tina Dietze	Germany	1:42.406	

==== Final B ====
Rank	Lane	Canoer	Country	Time	Notes
9	4	Hermien Peters; Lize Broekx	Belgium	1:38.475	
10	5	Li Dongyin; Zhou Yu	China	1:39.790	
11	3	Caroline Arft; Sarah Brüßler	Germany	1:39.953	
12	6	Ana Roxana Lehaci; Viktoria Schwarz	Austria	1:40.007	
13	8	Jaime Roberts; Jo Brigden-Jones	Australia	1:41.073	
14	7	Alicia Hoskin; Teneale Hatton	New Zealand	1:41.121	
15	2	Kira Stepanova; Varvara Baranova	ROC	1:44.054	
