= 2019 ICF Canoe Sprint World Championships – Women's K-1 5000 metres =

Women's K-1 5000 metres at the 2019 ICF Canoe Sprint World Championships
- Venue: Olympic Centre of Szeged
- Location: Szeged, Hungary
- Dates: 25 August
- Competitors: 25 from 25 nations
- Winning time: 22:03.23

Medalists
gold medal	Dóra Bodonyi	Hungary
silver medal	Tabea Medert	Germany
bronze medal	Maryna Litvinchuk	Belarus

The women's K-1 5000 metres competition at the 2019 ICF Canoe Sprint World Championships in Szeged took place at the Olympic Centre of Szeged.

== Schedule ==
The schedule was as follows:

Date	Time	Round
Sunday 25 August 2019	15:50	Final

All times are Central European Summer Time (UTC+2)

== Results ==
As a long-distance event, it was held as a direct final.

Rank	Kayaker	Country	Time
1st place, gold medalist(s)	Dóra Bodonyi	Hungary	22:03.23
2nd place, silver medalist(s)	Tabea Medert	Germany	22:03.85
3rd place, bronze medalist(s)	Maryna Litvinchuk	Belarus	22:04.08
4	Bridgitte Hartley	South Africa	22:17.76
5	Kristina Bedeč	Serbia	22:22.38
6	Lizzie Broughton	Great Britain	22:23.33
7	Alyssa Bull	Australia	22:39.15
8	Mariana Petrušová	Slovakia	22:39.75
9	Susanna Cicali	Italy	22:42.36
10	Eva Barrios	Spain	22:58.89
11	Jennifer Egan	Ireland	23:01.28
12	Anna Kožíšková	Czech Republic	23:03.75
13	Inna Hryshchun	Ukraine	23:07.87
14	Linnea Stensils	Sweden	23:13.95
15	Bolette Iversen	Denmark	23:13.97
16	Magdalena Garro	Argentina	23:22.19
17	Anna Sletsjøe	Norway	23:38.22
18	Kaitlyn McElroy	United States	23:38.79
19	Sarah Troël	France	24:02.27
20	Vera Sobetova	Russia	24:05.41
21	Deborah Saw	Singapore	24:35.84
22	Jo Shin-young	South Korea	25:00.89
23	Netta Malinen	Finland	25:28.64
24	Chen Wen-chun	Chinese Taipei	25:56.20
–	Hermien Peters	Belgium	DNF
