= 2018 ICF Canoe Sprint World Championships – Women's K-2 200 metres =

Women's K-2 200 metres at the 2018 ICF Canoe Sprint World Championships
- Venue: Centro de Alto Rendimento de Montemor-o-Velho
- Location: Montemor-o-Velho, Portugal
- Dates: 23–25 August
- Competitors: 34 from 17 nations
- Winning time: 37.157

Medalists
gold medal	Franziska Weber; Tina Dietze	Germany
silver medal	Kayla Imrie; Aimee Fisher	New Zealand
bronze medal	Mariia Kichasova-Skoryk; Anastasiya Horlova	Ukraine

The women's K-2 200 metres competition at the 2018 ICF Canoe Sprint World Championships in Montemor-o-Velho took place at the Centro de Alto Rendimento de Montemor-o-Velho.

== Schedule ==
The schedule was as follows:

Date	Time	Round
Thursday 23 August 2018	14:30	Heats
Thursday 23 August 2018	16:10	Semifinal
Saturday 25 August 2018	12:44	Final

All times are Western European Summer Time (UTC+1)

== Results ==
=== Heats ===
The fastest three boats in each heat advanced directly to the final. The next four fastest boats in each heat, plus the fastest remaining boat advanced to the semifinal.

==== Heat 1 ====
Rank	Kayakers	Country	Time	Notes
1	Franziska Weber; Tina Dietze	Germany	38.234	QF
2	Kayla Imrie; Aimee Fisher	New Zealand	38.244	QF
3	Réka Hagymási; Ágnes Szabó	Hungary	38.829	QF
4	Jaime Roberts; Jo Brigden-Jones	Australia	38.879	QS
5	Moa Wikberg; Karin Johansson	Sweden	40.409	QS
6	Beatriz Fragoza; Karina Alanis	Mexico	41.029	QS
7	Sabrina Ameghino; Brenda Rojas	Argentina	41.064	QS
8	Sara Sotero; Inês Costa	Portugal	41.939	
9	Jitta van der Laan; Selma Konijn	Netherlands	43.275	

==== Heat 2 ====
Rank	Kayakers	Country	Time	Notes
1	Mariia Kichasova-Skoryk; Anastasiya Horlova	Ukraine	38.246	QF
2	Karolina Markiewicz; Helena Wiśniewska	Poland	38.356	QF
3	Marharyta Makhneva; Maryna Litvinchuk	Belarus	38.621	QF
4	Natalia Podolskaya; Vera Sobetova	Russia	38.886	QS
5	Carolina García; Aida Bauza	Spain	39.806	QS
6	Kayla de Beer; Esti van Tonder	South Africa	40.336	QS
7	Natalie Davison; Alanna Bray-Lougheed	Canada	40.371	QS
8	Marianna Petrušová; Martina Gogolová	Slovakia	40.982	qS

=== Semifinal ===
The fastest three boats advanced to the final.

Rank	Kayakers	Country	Time	Notes
1	Jaime Roberts; Jo Brigden-Jones	Australia	39.794	QF
2	Natalia Podolskaya; Vera Sobetova	Russia	40.394	QF
3	Sabrina Ameghino; Brenda Rojas	Argentina	40.689	QF
4	Moa Wikberg; Karin Johansson	Sweden	40.989	
5	Beatriz Fragoza; Karina Alanis	Mexico	41.149	
6	Kayla de Beer; Esti van Tonder	South Africa	41.179	
7	Carolina García; Aida Bauza	Spain	41.399	
8	Natalie Davison; Alanna Bray-Lougheed	Canada	41.624	
9	Marianna Petrušová; Martina Gogolová	Slovakia	42.789	

=== Final ===
Competitors raced for positions 1 to 9, with medals going to the top three.

Rank	Kayakers	Country	Time
1st place, gold medalist(s)	Franziska Weber; Tina Dietze	Germany	37.157
2nd place, silver medalist(s)	Kayla Imrie; Aimee Fisher	New Zealand	37.197
3rd place, bronze medalist(s)	Mariia Kichasova-Skoryk; Anastasiya Horlova	Ukraine	37.294
4	Réka Hagymási; Ágnes Szabó	Hungary	37.411
5	Karolina Markiewicz; Helena Wiśniewska	Poland	37.437
6	Natalia Podolskaya; Vera Sobetova	Russia	37.631
7	Marharyta Makhneva; Maryna Litvinchuk	Belarus	37.794
8	Jaime Roberts; Jo Brigden-Jones	Australia	37.844
9	Sabrina Ameghino; Brenda Rojas	Argentina	39.328
