= 2017 ICF Canoe Sprint World Championships – Women's K-1 5000 metres =

Women's K-1 5000 metres at the 2017 ICF Canoe Sprint World Championships
- Venue: Sportcentrum Račice
- Location: Račice, Czech Republic
- Dates: 27 August
- Competitors: 25 from 25 nations
- Winning time: 23:17.862

Medalists
gold medal	Dóra Bodonyi	Hungary
silver medal	Tabea Medert	Germany
bronze medal	Lani Belcher	Great Britain

The women's K-1 5000 metres competition at the 2017 ICF Canoe Sprint World Championships in Račice took place at the Sportcentrum Račice.

== Schedule ==
The schedule was as follows:

Date	Time	Round
Sunday 27 August 2017	15:00	Final

All times are Central European Summer Time (UTC+2)

== Results ==
As a long-distance event, it was held as a direct final.

Rank	Kayaker	Country	Time
1st place, gold medalist(s)	Dóra Bodonyi	Hungary	23:17.862
2nd place, silver medalist(s)	Tabea Medert	Germany	23:19.214
3rd place, bronze medalist(s)	Lani Belcher	Great Britain	23:28.236
4	Kristina Bedeč	Serbia	23:44.420
5	Karin Johansson	Sweden	23:45.251
6	Alyce Burnett	Australia	23:49.983
7	Eva Barrios	Spain	23:59.741
8	Anna Kožíšková	Czech Republic	24:02.978
9	Lize Broekx	Belgium	24:06.404
10	Jennifer Egan	Ireland	24:34.562
11	Susanna Cicali	Italy	24:35.336
12	Michelle Russell	Canada	24:36.341
13	Netta Malinen	Finland	25:02.078
14	Nina Riosa	Estonia	25:06.941
15	Zoya Ananchenko	Kazakhstan	25:16.630
16	Kaitlyn McElroy	United States	25:17.293
17	Emma Jørgensen	Denmark	25:30.125
18	Sarah Troël	France	25:31.925
19	Yuliia Kolesnik	Ukraine	25:36.988
20	Karolina Markiewicz	Poland	25:53.562
21	Agostina Cappelletti	Italy	26:31.493
–	Yuliana Salakhova	Russia	DNF
–	Aleksandra Grishina	Belarus	DNF
–	Franziska Widmer	Switzerland	DSQ (Note: Franziska Widmer was disqualified for violating ICF rule 25.3)
–	Maoli Angulo	Ecuador	DSQ (Note: Maoli Angulo was disqualified for violating ICF rule 25.6)
