= 2019 ICF Canoe Sprint World Championships – Women's K-2 200 metres =

Women's K-2 200 metres at the 2019 ICF Canoe Sprint World Championships
- Venue: Olympic Centre of Szeged
- Location: Szeged, Hungary
- Dates: 21–23 August
- Competitors: 34 from 17 nations
- Winning time: 36.21

Medalists
gold medal	Maryna Litvinchuk; Volha Khudzenka	Belarus
silver medal	Špela Ponomarenko Janić; Anja Osterman	Slovenia
bronze medal	Blanka Kiss; Anna Lucz	Hungary

The women's K-2 200 metres competition at the 2019 ICF Canoe Sprint World Championships in Szeged took place at the Olympic Centre of Szeged.

== Schedule ==
The schedule was as follows:

Date	Time	Round
Wednesday 21 August 2019	10:00	Heats
Wednesday 21 August 2019	15:00	Semifinal
Friday 23 August 2019	15:03	Final

All times are Central European Summer Time (UTC+2)

== Results ==
=== Heats ===
The fastest three boats in each heat advanced directly to the final.
The next four fastest boats in each heat, plus the fastest remaining boat advanced to the semifinal.

==== Heat 1 ====
Rank	Kayakers	Country	Time	Notes
1	Špela Ponomarenko Janić; Anja Osterman	Slovenia	37.14	QF
2	Blanka Kiss; Anna Lucz	Hungary	37.91	QF
3	Mariya Povkh; Liudmyla Kuklinovska	Ukraine	38.11	QF
4	Brenda Gutiérrez; Beatriz Briones	Mexico	39.21	QS
5	Bridgitte Hartley; Donna Hutton	South Africa	40.42	QS
6	Eva Barrios; Laura Pedruelo	Spain	40.87	QS
7	Chou Ju-chuan; Liu Hui-chi	Chinese Taipei	42.29	QS
8	Laura Skukauska; Katrina Smiltniece	Latvia	42.84	
9	Amira Kheris; Anfel Arabi	Algeria	44.96	

==== Heat 2 ====
Rank	Kayakers	Country	Time	Notes
1	Maryna Litvinchuk; Volha Khudzenka	Belarus	36.77	QF
2	Tina Dietze; Franziska John	Germany	38.07	QF
3	Kristina Kovnir; Anastasiia Dolgova	Russia	38.16	QF
4	Jo Brigden-Jones; Jaime Roberts	Australia	38.34	QS
5	Ekaterina Shubina; Yuliya Borzova	Uzbekistan	39.30	QS
6	Arezou Hakimimoghaddam; Hediyeh Kazemi	Iran	40.41	QS
7	Sarah Chen Jiemei; Stephenie Chen Jiexian	Singapore	40.55	QS
8	Kaitlyn McElroy; Samantha Barlow	United States	42.56	qS

=== Semifinal ===
The fastest three boats advanced to the final.

Rank	Kayakers	Country	Time	Notes
1	Jo Brigden-Jones; Jaime Roberts	Australia	37.10	QF
2	Brenda Gutiérrez; Beatriz Briones	Mexico	37.15	QF
3	Ekaterina Shubina; Yuliya Borzova	Uzbekistan	37.39	QF
4	Bridgitte Hartley; Donna Hutton	South Africa	38.08	
5	Arezou Hakimimoghaddam; Hediyeh Kazemi	Iran	38.37	
6	Eva Barrios; Laura Pedruelo	Spain	38.48	
7	Sarah Chen Jiemei; Stephenie Chen Jiexian	Singapore	39.10	
8	Kaitlyn McElroy; Samantha Barlow	United States	39.22	
9	Chou Ju-chuan; Liu Hui-chi	Chinese Taipei	40.35	

=== Final ===
Competitors raced for positions 1 to 9, with medals going to the top three.

Rank	Kayakers	Country	Time
1st place, gold medalist(s)	Maryna Litvinchuk; Volha Khudzenka	Belarus	36.21
2nd place, silver medalist(s)	Špela Ponomarenko Janić; Anja Osterman	Slovenia	36.72
3rd place, bronze medalist(s)	Blanka Kiss; Anna Lucz	Hungary	36.79
4	Kristina Kovnir; Anastasiia Dolgova	Russia	36.99
5	Mariya Povkh; Liudmyla Kuklinovska	Ukraine	37.11
6	Tina Dietze; Franziska John	Germany	37.32
7	Brenda Gutiérrez; Beatriz Briones	Mexico	38.03
8	Jo Brigden-Jones; Jaime Roberts	Australia	38.35
9	Ekaterina Shubina; Yuliya Borzova	Uzbekistan	38.75
