= 2021 ICF Canoe Sprint World Championships – Women's K-2 500 metres =

Women's K-2 500 metres at the 2021 ICF Canoe Sprint World Championships
- Venue: Lake Bagsværd
- Location: Copenhagen, Denmark
- Dates: 16–18 September
- Competitors: 46 from 23 nations
- Winning time: 1:40.52

Medalists
gold medal	Danuta Kozák; Tamara Csipes	Hungary
silver medal	Volha Khudzenka; Maryna Litvinchuk	Belarus
bronze medal	Hermien Peters; Lize Broekx	Belgium

The women's K-2 500 metres competition at the 2021 ICF Canoe Sprint World Championships in Copenhagen took place on Lake Bagsværd.

== Schedule ==
The schedule was as follows:

Date	Time	Round
Thursday 16 September 2021	14:45	Heats
Friday 17 September 2021	14:50	Semifinals
Saturday 18 September 2021	09:30	Final B
Saturday 18 September 2021	12:41	Final A

All times are Central European Summer Time (UTC+2)

== Results ==
=== Heats ===
Heat winners advanced directly to the A final.
The next six fastest boats in each heat advanced to the semifinals.

==== Heat 1 ====
Rank	Kayakers	Country	Time	Notes
1	Danuta Kozák; Tamara Csipes	Hungary	1:46.10	QA
2	Volha Khudzenka; Maryna Litvinchuk	Belarus	1:48.51	QS
3	Kristina Kovnir; Anastasiia Dolgova	RCF	1:49.26	QS
4	Ana Roxana Lehaci; Viktoria Schwarz	Austria	1:53.67	QS
5	Claire Bren; Margot Maillet	France	1:54.47	QS
6	Kitty Preuper; Ruth Vorsselman	Netherlands	1:58.05	QS
7	Esti Olivier; Bridgitte Hartley	South Africa	2:01.57	QS
–	Luo Lu; Peng Yanjun	China	DNS	

==== Heat 2 ====
Rank	Kayakers	Country	Time	Notes
1	Martyna Klatt; Sandra Ostrowska	Poland	1:48.60	QA
2	Marija Dostanić; Kristina Bedeč	Serbia	1:48.85	QS
3	Caroline Arft; Sarah Brüßler	Germany	1:49.35	QS
4	Diana Tanko; Inna Hryshchun	Ukraine	1:50.78	QS
5	Julie Funch; Bolette Nyvang Iversen	Denmark	1:53.30	QS
6	Maria Rei; Francisca Laia	Portugal	1:53.41	QS
7	Michelle Russell; Riley Melanson	Canada	1:55.63	QS
8	Victoria Chiew; Soh Sze Ying	Singapore	1:59.35	

==== Heat 3 ====
Rank	Kayakers	Country	Time	Notes
1	Deborah Kerr; Emma Russell	Great Britain	1:47.20	QA
2	Hermien Peters; Lize Broekx	Belgium	1:47.61	QS
3	Melina Andersson; Julia Lagerstam	Sweden	1:50.87	QS
4	Karina Alanís; Maricela Montemayor	Mexico	1:51.50	QS
5	Štěpánka Sobíšková; Barbora Galádová	Czech Republic	1:53.20	QS
6	Sara Ouzande; Carolina García	Spain	1:59.77	QS
–	Špela Ponomarenko Janić; Anja Osterman	Slovenia	DNS	

=== Semifinals ===
Qualification was as follows:

The fastest three boats in each semi advanced to the A final.
The next four fastest boats in each semi, plus the fastest remaining boat advanced to the B final.

==== Semifinal 1 ====
Rank	Kayakers	Country	Time	Notes
1	Kristina Kovnir; Anastasiia Dolgova	RCF	1:44.86	QA
2	Hermien Peters; Lize Broekx	Belgium	1:46.22	QA
3	Caroline Arft; Sarah Brüßler	Germany	1:46.60	QA
4	Claire Bren; Margot Maillet	France	1:47.68	QB
5	Diana Tanko; Inna Hryshchun	Ukraine	1:48.24	QB
6	Karina Alanís; Maricela Montemayor	Mexico	1:48.79	QB
7	Maria Rei; Francisca Laia	Portugal	1:49.56	QB
8	Kitty Preuper; Ruth Vorsselman	Netherlands	1:51.05	qB

==== Semifinal 2 ====
Rank	Kayakers	Country	Time	Notes
1	Volha Khudzenka; Maryna Litvinchuk	Belarus	1:45.09	QA
2	Ana Roxana Lehaci; Viktoria Schwarz	Austria	1:47.19	QA
3	Marija Dostanić; Kristina Bedeč	Serbia	1:47.59	QA
4	Štěpánka Sobíšková; Barbora Galádová	Czech Republic	1:47.85	QB
5	Sara Ouzande; Carolina García	Spain	1:49.58	QB
6	Melina Andersson; Julia Lagerstam	Sweden	1:49.65	QB
7	Julie Funch; Bolette Nyvang Iversen	Denmark	1:51.24	QB
8	Michelle Russell; Riley Melanson	Canada	1:52.69	
9	Esti Olivier; Bridgitte Hartley	South Africa	2:01.43	

=== Finals ===
==== Final B ====
Competitors in this final raced for positions 10 to 18.

Rank	Kayakers	Country	Time
1	Diana Tanko; Inna Hryshchun	Ukraine	1:45.22
2	Claire Bren; Margot Maillet	France	1:45.95
3	Melina Andersson; Julia Lagerstam	Sweden	1:46.45
4	Štěpánka Sobíšková; Barbora Galádová	Czech Republic	1:46.75
5	Karina Alanís; Maricela Montemayor	Mexico	1:47.08
6	Maria Rei; Francisca Laia	Portugal	1:47.29
7	Julie Funch; Bolette Nyvang Iversen	Denmark	1:48.37
8	Sara Ouzande; Carolina García	Spain	1:48.51
9	Kitty Preuper; Ruth Vorsselman	Netherlands	1:49.30

==== Final A ====
Competitors raced for positions 1 to 9, with medals going to the top three.

Rank	Kayakers	Country	Time
1st place, gold medalist(s)	Danuta Kozák; Tamara Csipes	Hungary	1:40.52
2nd place, silver medalist(s)	Volha Khudzenka; Maryna Litvinchuk	Belarus	1:40.70
3rd place, bronze medalist(s)	Hermien Peters; Lize Broekx	Belgium	1:42.15
4	Deborah Kerr; Emma Russell	Great Britain	1:43.62
5	Martyna Klatt; Sandra Ostrowska	Poland	1:43.70
6	Kristina Kovnir; Anastasiia Dolgova	RCF	1:43.74
7	Caroline Arft; Sarah Brüßler	Germany	1:44.39
8	Marija Dostanić; Kristina Bedeč	Serbia	1:45.08
9	Ana Roxana Lehaci; Viktoria Schwarz	Austria	1:46.68
