= Canoeing at the 2016 Summer Olympics – Women's K-2 500 metres =

Women's canoe sprint K-2 500 metres at the Games of the XXXI Olympiad
- Venue: Lagoa Stadium
- Date: 15–16 August 2016
- Competitors: 30 from 15 nations
- Winning time: 1:43.687

Medalists
1st place, gold medalist(s)		Gabriella Szabó; Danuta Kozák	Hungary
2nd place, silver medalist(s)		Franziska Weber; Tina Dietze	Germany
3rd place, bronze medalist(s)		Karolina Naja; Beata Mikołajczyk	Poland

The women's canoe sprint K-2 500 metres at the 2016 Olympic Games in Rio de Janeiro took place between 15 and 16 August at Lagoa Stadium. The medals were presented by Pál Schmitt, IOC member, Hungary and Thomas Konietzko, Board Member of the ICF.

== Competition format ==
The competition comprised heats, semifinals, and a final round. The top boats from each heat advances to the "A" final, and the remaining boats advance to the semifinals. The top two boats in each semifinal and the next overall best boat advanced to the "A" final, and competed for medals. A placing "B" final was held for the other semifinalists.

== Schedule ==
All times are Brasilia Time (UTC-03:00)

Date	Time	Round
Monday 15 August 2016	8:24; 9:46	Heats; Semifinals
Tuesday 16 August 2016	8:16	Finals

== Results ==
=== Heats ===
First boat progresses to A final and the remaining boats are qualified for the semifinals. The fastest three boats in each semifinal qualify for the 'A' final. The remaining boats in each semifinal qualify for the 'B' final.

==== Heat 1 ====
Rank	Canoer	Country	Time	Notes
1	Gabriella Szabó; Danuta Kozák	Hungary	1:41.092	FA
2	Karolina Naja; Beata Mikołajczyk	Poland	1:41.766	SF
3	Anastasiia Todorova; Inna Hryshchun	Ukraine	1:43.967	SF
4	Nadzeya Liapeshka; Maryna Litvinchuk	Belarus	1:44.835	SF
5	Elena Aniushina; Kira Stepanova	Russia	1:45.906	SF
6	Genevieve Orton; KC Fraser	Canada	1:46.148	SF
7	Alyssa Bull; Alyce Burnett	Australia	1:46.933	SF
8	Lani Belcher; Angela Hannah	Great Britain	1:53.948	SF

==== Heat 2 ====
Rank	Canoer	Country	Time	Notes
1	Franziska Weber; Tina Dietze	Germany	1:42.184	FA
2	Wenjun Ren; Qing Ma	China	1:44.491	SF
3	Natalya Sergeyeva; Irina Podoinikova	Kazakhstan	1:45.369	SF
4	Amalie Thomsen; Ida Villumsen	Denmark	1:46.246	SF
5	Nikolina Moldovan; Milica Starovic	Serbia	1:46.410	SF
6	Yvonne Schuring; Ana-Roxana Lehaci	Austria	1:46.429	SF
7	Karin Johansson; Sofia Paldanius	Sweden	1:46.456	SF

=== Semifinals ===
The fastest three boats in each semifinal qualify for the 'A' final. The remaining boats in each semifinal qualify for the 'B' final.

==== Semifinal 1 ====
Rank	Canoer	Country	Time	Notes
1	Nadzeya Liapeshka; Maryna Litvinchuk	Belarus	1:42.285	FA
2	Anastasiia Todorova; Inna Hryshchun	Ukraine	1:43.363	FA
3	Alyssa Bull; Alyce Burnett	Australia	1:44.290	FA
4	Yvonne Schuring; Ana-Roxana Lehaci	Austria	1:44.462	FB
5	Wenjun Ren; Qing Ma	China	1:44.780	FB
6	Nikolina Moldovan; Milica Starovic	Serbia	1:46.008	FB

==== Semifinal 2 ====
Rank	Canoer	Country	Time	Notes
1	Karolina Naja; Beata Mikołajczyk	Poland	1:41.684	FA
2	Elena Aniushina; Kira Stepanova	Russia	1:42.439	FA
3	Natalya Sergeyeva; Irina Podoinikova	Kazakhstan	1:43.577	FA
4	Karin Johansson; Sofia Paldanius	Sweden	1:44.090	FB
5	Genevieve Orton; KC Fraser	Canada	1:45.351	FB
6	Amalie Thomsen; Ida Villumsen	Denmark	1:47.476	FB
7	Lani Belcher; Angela Hannah	Great Britain	1:49.285	FB

=== Finals ===
==== Final B ====
Rank	Canoer	Country	Time
1	Karin Johansson; Sofia Paldanius	Sweden	1:47.207
2	Nikolina Moldovan; Milica Starovic	Serbia	1:48.146
3	Yvonne Schuring; Ana-Roxana Lehaci	Austria	1:48.834
4	Amalie Thomsen; Ida Villumsen	Denmark	1:48.846
5	Genevieve Orton; KC Fraser	Canada	1:49.389
6	Wenjun Ren; Qing Ma	China	1:51.582
7	Lani Belcher; Angela Hannah	Great Britain	1:54.193

==== Final A ====
Rank	Canoer	Country	Time
1st place, gold medalist(s)	Gabriella Szabó; Danuta Kozák	Hungary	1:43.687
2nd place, silver medalist(s)	Franziska Weber; Tina Dietze	Germany	1:43.738
3rd place, bronze medalist(s)	Karolina Naja; Beata Mikołajczyk	Poland	1:45.207
4	Anastasiia Todorova; Inna Hryshchun	Ukraine	1:45.868
5	Elena Aniushina; Kira Stepanova	Russia	1:46.319
6	Nadzeya Liapeshka; Maryna Litvinchuk	Belarus	1:46.967
7	Natalya Sergeyeva; Irina Podoinikova	Kazakhstan	1:48.361
8	Alyssa Bull; Alyce Burnett	Australia	1:51.915
