= Jaime Roberts =

Australian canoeist

Personal information
- Born: 6 December 1990 (age 35) Western Australia, Australia
- Height: 170 cm (5 ft 7 in)

Sport
- Country: Australia
- Sport: Canoe sprint

Jaime Roberts (born 6 December 1990) is an Australian canoeist. She qualified to represent Australia at the 2020 Summer Olympics. Her team consisting of Jo Brigden-Jones, Catherine McArthur, and Shannon Reynolds made the women's K-4 final but failed to win a medal, coming 7th with a time of 1:39.797 over two seconds slower than their best time in the heats.

Roberts also competed in the Women's K-2 500 metres with Alyce Wood. They missed out on a medal when they came fifth in their semi-final.

== Early years ==
Roberts learnt to swim from an early age as her family had a swimming and surf lifesaving background. In 2012, Roberts was crowned Western Australian (WA) State ski champion in surf lifesaving. She switched to flat water paddling in 2013. She was inspired to aim for the Olympics after listening to the radio call of the Australian men's K-4 1000 gold medal-winning race at the London 2012 Olympics. She decided to give kayaking a crack and see if she could make it to the Olympic Games,.

At the 2013 WA State Kayaking Championships Roberts was noticed by the Western Australian Institute of Sport Head Coach and this paved the path to her future success.

== Achievements ==
In 2014 Roberts represented Australia competing at World Cup and World Championships. As an Australian Surf Life Saving Championships finalist in ski events, Roberts represented the Mullaloo SLSC and has also represented Australia at the Lifesaving World Championships.

Paddling with Catherine McArthur she finished 8th in both the Women's K-2 200 metres and the Women's K-2 1000 metres at the 2017 ICF Canoe Sprint World Championships. At the 2018 ICF Canoe Sprint World Championships she and Brigden-Jones finished 8th in the Women's K-2 200 metres and 7th in Women's K-4 500 metres the with Alyssa Bull, Alyce Burnett and Brigden-Jones. She and Brigden-Jones finished 8th in the Women's K-2 200 metres and 7th in the Women's K-4 500 metres at the 2019 ICF Canoe Sprint World Championships.
