= São Tomé and Príncipe at the 2026 Summer Youth Olympics =

- Flag of São Tomé and Príncipe
- IOC code: STP
- NOC: Comité Olímpico de São Tomé e Príncipe

in Dakar, Senegal October 31, 2026 – November 13, 2026
- Competitors: 2 in 2 sports
- Flag bearers: Lelzica Vaz & Aldo Madredeus
- Medals: Gold 0 Silver 0 Bronze 0 Total 0

Summer Youth Olympics appearances
- 2010; 2014; 2018; 2026

São Tomé and Príncipe competed at the 2026 Summer Youth Olympics in Dakar, Senegal from October 31 to November 13, 2026. This marked São Tomé and Príncipe's fourth appearance at the Youth Olympics, after making its debut in 2010.

Athlete Lelzica Vaz and judoka Aldo Madredeus served as the flag bearers for the opening ceremony.

== Competitors ==
The following is the list of number of competitors participating at the Games per sport/discipline.

Sport	Men	Women	Total
Athletics	0	1	1
Judo	1	0	1
Total	1	1	2

== Athletics ==
São Tomé and Príncipe entered one female athlete.

=== Track & road events ===
Women

Athlete	Event	Semifinal		Final	
Athlete	Event	Result	Rank	Result	Rank
Lelzika Vaz	200 m				

== Judo ==
São Tomé and Príncipe entered one male judoka based on the available quotas assigned by the International Judo Federation.

Men

Athlete	Event	Round of 16	Quarterfinals	Semifinals	Repechage 1	Repechage 2	Final	
Athlete	Event	Opposition Result	Opposition Result	Opposition Result	Opposition Result	Opposition Result	Opposition Result	Rank
Aldo Madredeus	–66 kg							
