= 2017 ICF Canoe Sprint World Championships – Women's K-2 1000 metres =

Women's K-2 1000 metres at the 2017 ICF Canoe Sprint World Championships
- Venue: Sportcentrum Račice
- Location: Račice, Czech Republic
- Dates: 24–26 August
- Competitors: 20 from 10 nations
- Winning time: 3:37.149

Medalists
gold medal	Erika Medveczky; Ramóna Farkasdi	Hungary
silver medal	Tabea Medert; Melanie Gebhardt	Germany
bronze medal	Paulina Paszek; Justyna Iskrzycka	Poland

The women's K-2 1000 metres competition at the 2017 ICF Canoe Sprint World Championships in Račice took place at the Sportcentrum Račice.

== Schedule ==
The schedule was as follows:

Date	Time	Round
Thursday 24 August 2017	11:42	Heats
Thursday 24 August 2017	17:48	Semifinal
Saturday 26 August 2017	12:01	Final

All times are Central European Summer Time (UTC+2)

== Results ==
=== Heats ===
The fastest three boats in each heat advanced directly to the final. The next four fastest boats in each heat, plus the fastest remaining boat advanced to the semifinal.

==== Heat 1 ====
Rank	Kayakers	Country	Time	Notes
1	Tabea Medert; Melanie Gebhardt	Germany	3:45.693	QF
2	Paulina Paszek; Justyna Iskrzycka	Poland	3:45.965	QF
3	Yuliana Salakhova; Vera Sobetova	Russia	3:47.248	QF
4	Irina Podoinikova; Zoya Ananchenko	Kazakhstan	3:47.343	QS
5	Courtney Stott; Alanna Bray-Lougheed	Canada	3:49.604	QS
6	Štěpánka Sobíšková; Barbora Galádová	Czech Republic	3:51.376	QS

==== Heat 2 ====
Rank	Kayakers	Country	Time	Notes
1	Erika Medveczky; Ramóna Farkasdi	Hungary	3:49.637	QF
2	Irina Lauric; Florentina Caminescu	Romania	3:51.415	QF
3	Catherine McArthur; Jaime Roberts	Australia	3:53.471	QF
4	Franziska Widmer; Livia Haudenschild	Switzerland	4:00.010	QS

=== Semifinal ===
The fastest three boats advanced to the final.

Rank	Kayakers	Country	Time	Notes
1	Irina Podoinikova; Zoya Ananchenko	Kazakhstan	3:53.865	QF
2	Courtney Stott; Alanna Bray-Lougheed	Canada	3:54.771	QF
3	Štěpánka Sobíšková; Barbora Galádová	Czech Republic	3:56.160	QF
4	Franziska Widmer; Livia Haudenschild	Switzerland	3:56.887	

=== Final ===
Competitors raced for positions 1 to 9, with medals going to the top three.

Rank	Kayakers	Country	Time
1st place, gold medalist(s)	Erika Medveczky; Ramóna Farkasdi	Hungary	3:37.149
2nd place, silver medalist(s)	Tabea Medert; Melanie Gebhardt	Germany	3:42.061
3rd place, bronze medalist(s)	Paulina Paszek; Justyna Iskrzycka	Poland	3:42.838
4	Irina Podoinikova; Zoya Ananchenko	Kazakhstan	3:43.411
5	Yuliana Salakhova; Vera Sobetova	Russia	3:45.461
6	Courtney Stott; Alanna Bray-Lougheed	Canada	3:46.716
7	Štěpánka Sobíšková; Barbora Galádová	Czech Republic	3:47.861
8	Catherine McArthur; Jaime Roberts	Australia	3:49.311
9	Irina Lauric; Florentina Caminescu	Romania	3:50.361
