= Shannon Reynolds =

Australian canoeist

Personal information
- Nickname: Shan
- Born: 3 January 1995 (age 31) Western Australia

Sport
- Country: Australia
- Sport: Canoe sprint

Shannon Reynolds (born 3 January 1995) is an Australian canoeist. She qualified to represent Australia at the 2020 Summer Olympics. Her team consisting of Jo Brigden-Jones, Catherine McArthur, and Jaime Roberts made the women's K-4 final but failed to win a medal, coming 7th with a time of 1:39.797 over two seconds slower than their best time in the heats.

== Early years ==
From an early age, it was evident that Reynolds possessed the physical attributes of a kayaker. At the age of 14, she joined the Bayswater Paddle Club. She was highly dedicated, training both on the water and at the gym.

Reynolds represented Australia at the 2013 Australian Youth Olympic Festival. Later that year, she also competed at the Junior World Championships, finishing eighth as part of Australia's K-4 500 crew.

== Achievements ==
Reynolds was selected for Australia's Under 23 World Championships team and competed in 2014, 2015 and 2017.

Reynolds managed to finish fifth in the women's K1 500 at the 2020 Australian Canoe Sprint Championships and therefore qualified for the Tokyo 2020 Olympics..

Reynolds is trained in nursing and midwifery and works as a first aid officer at a local high school.
