= Catherine McArthur =

Australian canoeist

Personal information
- Nickname: Cat
- Nationality: Australian
- Born: 3 August 1992 (age 34) Singapore
- Height: 174 cm (5 ft 9 in)

Sport
- Country: Australia
- Sport: Canoe sprint

Catherine McArthur (born 3 August 1992) is an Australian canoeist. She qualified to represent Australia at the 2020 Summer Olympics. Her team consisting of Jo Brigden-Jones, Shannon Reynolds and Jaime Roberts made the women's K-4 final but failed to win a medal, coming 7th with a time of 1:39.797 over two seconds slower than their best time in the heats.

== Early years ==
Born in Singapore, McArthur went to boarding school in Melbourne. She joined the South Australian Sports Institute while studying at the University of Adelaide. McArthur later moved to the Gold Coast where she is coached by Anna Wood in the Queensland Academy of Sport National Women's Canoe Sprint Program.

McArthur started paddling as a 16-year-old as part of a school sport program. Her influence was a friend's older sister who was a kayaker She paddled in a school team relay at the Murray Marathon and between 2012 and 2015, McArthur represented Australia at the Under 23 World Championships and managed several top 10 results including K-1 500 bronze in 2015.

== Achievements ==
Paddling with Jaime Roberts she finished 8th in both the Women's K-2 200 metres and the Women's K-2 1000 metres at the 2017 ICF Canoe Sprint World Championships. She competed in the Women's K-1 200 metres and Women's K-1 5000 metres at the 2018 ICF Canoe Sprint World Championships. At the 2019 ICF Canoe Sprint World Championships she competed in the Women's K-1 500 metres and with Brianna Massie in the Women's K-2 500 metres.

McArthur assisted getting additional Tokyo 2020 quota positions when she and paddle partner Brianna Massie defeated New Zealand in the K-2 500 at the 2020 Oceania Canoe Sprint Championships. She then finished fourth in the K-1 500 at the 2020 Australian Canoe Sprint Championships and third in the K-2 500 thus securing a spot at the 2020 Tokyo Olympics..

McArthur is a part-time physiotherapist and pilates instructor.
