= Villumsen =

Villumsen is a surname. Notable people with the surname include:

- Ida Villumsen, Danish canoeist
- Linda Villumsen, Danish cyclist
- Nikolaj Villumsen, Danish politician
