= São Tomé and Príncipe at the 2014 Summer Youth Olympics =

- IOC code: STP
- NOC: Comité Olímpico de São Tomé e Príncipe

in Nanjing
- Competitors: 4 in 3 sports
- Medals: Gold 0 Silver 0 Bronze 0 Total 0

Summer Youth Olympics appearances
- 2010; 2014; 2018; 2026

São Tomé and Príncipe competed at the 2014 Summer Youth Olympics, in Nanjing, China from 16 August to 28 August 2014.

== Athletics ==
São Tomé and Príncipe qualified one athlete.

Qualification Legend: Q=Final A (medal); qB=Final B (non-medal); qC=Final C (non-medal); qD=Final D (non-medal); qE=Final E (non-medal)

Girls
Track & road events

Athlete	Event	Heats		Final	
Athlete	Event	Result	Rank	Result	Rank
Albenzinia Tavares Soares	400 m	1:00.60	18 qC	1:00.96	18

== Beach Volleyball ==
São Tomé and Príncipe was given a team to compete from the tripartite committee.

Athletes	Event	Preliminary round	Standing	Round of 24	Round of 16	Quarterfinals	Semifinals	Final / BM	Rank
Athletes	Event	Opposition Score	Standing	Opposition Score	Opposition Score	Opposition Score	Opposition Score	Opposition Score	Rank
Aloisio de Sousa; Alex Quaresma Marques	Boys'	Jongklang/Nakprakhong (THA); L 0 – 2	5	did not advance					
Aloisio de Sousa; Alex Quaresma Marques	Boys'	Plotnytskyi/Kovalov (UKR); L 0 – 2	5	did not advance					
Aloisio de Sousa; Alex Quaresma Marques	Boys'	MacNeil/Richards (CAN); L 0 – 2	5	did not advance					
Aloisio de Sousa; Alex Quaresma Marques	Boys'	Aveiro/Aulisi (ARG); L 0 – 2	5	did not advance					
Aloisio de Sousa; Alex Quaresma Marques	Boys'	Lombi/Kamara (SLE); W w/o	5	did not advance					

== Canoeing ==
São Tomé and Príncipe was given a boat to compete by the tripartite committee.

Girls

Athlete	Event	Qualification		Repechage		Round of 16		Quarterfinals	Semifinals	Final / BM	Rank
Athlete	Event	Time	Rank	Time	Rank	Time	Rank	Opposition Result	Opposition Result	Opposition Result	Rank
Adalzira Ferreira da Silva Torres	K1 slalom	1:46.186	18 R	1:47.528	9	did not advance					
Adalzira Ferreira da Silva Torres	K1 sprint	2:28.016	17 R	2:23.856	8 Q	2:22.806	15	did not advance			
