= Jos Broekx =

Belgian sprint canoer (born 1951)

Medal record

Men's canoe sprint

World Championships
Silver medal – second place	1974 Mexico City	K-2 10000 m
Bronze medal – third place	1973 Tampere	K-2 10000 m

Josse "Jos" Broekx (born 14 December 1951) is a Belgian canoe sprinter who competed from the early 1970s to the early 1980s. He won two medals in the K-2 10000 m event at the ICF Canoe Sprint World Championships with a silver in 1974 and a bronze in 1973.

Broekx also competed in three Summer Olympics, but did not advance to the finals in any event he competed. Broekx's best finish was fourth in the semifinal round twice (K-4 1000 m: 1972, 1976).

His brothers Erik and Paul Broekx, his brother-in-law Paul Stinckens and his niece Lize Broekx also competed as canoe sprinters.
