= Canoeing at the 2010 Summer Youth Olympics – Boys' K1 sprint =

These are the results of the Boys' K1 Sprint at the 2010 Summer Youth Olympics. It took place at the Marina Reservoir. Time Trial Round was on August 21, 2010. First elimination round, repechage and third round took place on August 21, and quarterfinals, semifinals and medals rounds were on August 22.

== Medalists ==
Gold	Sandor Totka; Hungary
Silver	Tom Liebscher; Germany
Bronze	Inigo Garcia; Spain

== Time Trial ==
Rank	Athlete	Time
1	Sandor Totka (HUN)	1:29.39
2	Andrei Tsarykovich (BLR)	1:30.85
3	Ali Aghamirzaei (IRI)	1:32.78
4	Tom Liebscher (GER)	1:32.80
5	Elvis Sutkus (LTU)	1:33.06
6	Inigo Garcia (ESP)	1:33.19
7	Vasyl Zelnychenko (UKR)	1:33.31
8	Renier Mora Jimenez (CUB)	1:33.65
9	Joao Paulo Barbosa da Silva (POR)	1:33.68
10	Igor Kalashnikov (RUS)	1:33.74
11	Scott Smith (AUS)	1:33.75
12	Boris Nedyalkov (BUL)	1:34.32
13	Igor Dolata (POL)	1:34.36
14	Brandon Wei Cheng Ooi (SIN)	1:34.59
15	Guillaume Bernis (FRA)	1:36.47
16	Simon Brus (SLO)	1:37.09
17	Ruslan Moltaev (KGZ)	1:40.00
18	Luke Stowman (RSA)	1:40.34
19	Vanderley Cabral de Assuncao Silva (STP)	1:45.22
20	Jiří Prskavec (CZE)	1:50.22
21	Andrew Martin (GBR)	1:51.63
22	Miroslav Urban (SVK)	1:58.48
23	Dipoko Dikongue (CMR)	3:18.67
	Wion Welh (LBR)	DNF

== First round ==
The winners and fastest loser advanced to the 3rd round. Losers raced at the repechages.

Match 1

Name	Time
Andrei Tsarykovich (BLR)	1:32.87
Dipoko Dikongue (CMR)	2:46.30

Match 2

Name	Time
Ali Aghamirzaei (IRI)	1:33.26
Miroslav Urban (SVK)	1:56.99

Match 3

Name	Time
Tom Liebscher (GER)	1:30.66
Andrew Martin (GBR)	1:49.52

Match 4

Name	Time
Elvis Sutkus (LTU)	1:33.10
Jiří Prskavec (CZE)	1:51.29

Match 5

Name	Time
Inigo Garcia (ESP)	1:33.27
Vanderley Cabral de Assuncao Silva (STP)	1:42.15

Match 6

Name	Time
Vasyl Zelnychenko (UKR)	1:32.91
Luke Stowman (RSA)	1:39.46

Match 7

Name	Time
Renier Mora Jimenez (CUB)	1:34.20
Ruslan Moltaev (KGZ)	1:39.17

Match 8

Name	Time
Joao Paulo Barbosa da Silva (POR)	1:32.59
Simon Brus (SLO)	1:33.97

Match 9

Name	Time
Igor Kalashnikov (RUS)	1:33.15
Guillaume Bernis (FRA)	1:35.31

Match 10

Name	Time
Scott Smith (AUS)	1:32.66
Brandon Wei Cheng Ooi (SIN)	1:32.90

Match 11

Name	Time
Igor Dolata (POL)	1:32.45
Boris Nedyalkov (BUL)	1:33.31

== Repechage ==
The fastest 3 boats advanced to the 3rd round.

Repechage 1

Name	Time
Boris Nedyalkov (BUL)	1:37.66
Dipoko Dikongue (CMR)	2:39.13

Repechage 2

Name	Time
Simon Brus (SLO)	1:35.57
Miroslav Urban (SVK)	2:05.70

Repechage 3

Name	Time
Guillaume Bernis (FRA)	1:37.58
Jiří Prskavec (CZE)	1:52.09

Repechage 4

Name	Time
Ruslan Moltaev (KGZ)	1:41.52
Andrew Martin (GBR)	1:52.26

Repechage 5

Name	Time
Luke Stowman (RSA)	1:40.35
Vanderley Cabral de Assuncao Silva (STP)	1:44.31

== Third round ==
The winners advanced to the quarterfinals.

Match 1

Name	Time
Sandor Totka (HUN)	1:30.14
Boris Nedyalkov (BUL)	1:35.53

Match 2

Name	Time
Tom Liebscher (GER)	1:30.48
Guillaume Bernis (FRA)	1:36.76

Match 3

Name	Time
Igor Dolata (POL)	1:33.14
Simon Brus (SLO)	1:34.57

Match 4

Name	Time
Renier Mora Jimenez (CUB)	1:33.65
Joao Paulo Barbosa da Silva (POR)	1:34.04

Match 5

Name	Time
Inigo Garcia (ESP)	1:32.70
Scott Smith (AUS)	1:34.31

Match 6

Name	Time
Andrei Tsarykovich (BLR)	1:31.20
Ali Aghamirzaei (IRI)	1:31.94

Match 7

Name	Time
Igor Kalashnikov (RUS)	1:32.06
Brandon Wei Cheng Ooi (SIN)	1:33.54

Match 8

Name	Time
Vasyl Zelnychenko (UKR)	1:35.63
Elvis Sutkus (LTU)	DNF

== Quarterfinals ==
The winners advanced to the semifinals.

Match 1

Name	Time
Sandor Totka (HUN)	1:32.18
Vasyl Zelnychenko (UKR)	1:34.05

Match 2

Name	Time
Tom Liebscher (GER)	1:30.09
Renier Mora Jimenez (CUB)	1:35.15

Match 3

Name	Time
Andrei Tsarykovich (BLR)	1:32.46
Igor Dolata (POL)	1:35.55

Match 4

Name	Time
Inigo Garcia (ESP)	1:32.42
Igor Kalashnikov (RUS)	1:32.87

== Semifinals ==
The winners advanced to the finals, losers advanced to the bronze medal match.

Match 1

Name	Time
Tom Liebscher (GER)	1:31.83
Andrei Tsarykovich (BLR)	1:37.29

Match 2

Name	Time
Sandor Totka (HUN)	1:31.17
Inigo Garcia (ESP)	1:36.68

== Finals ==
Gold Medal Match

Rank	Name	Time
1st place, gold medalist(s)	Sandor Totka (HUN)	1:28.91
2nd place, silver medalist(s)	Tom Liebscher (GER)	1:29.05

Bronze Medal Match

Rank	Name	Time
3rd place, bronze medalist(s)	Inigo Garcia (ESP)	1:32.47
4	Andrei Tsarykovich (BLR)	1:32.60
