= 2023 ICF Canoe Sprint World Championships – Women's K-1 1000 metres =

Women's K-1 1000 metres at the 2023 ICF Canoe Sprint World Championships
- Venue: Sportpark Duisburg
- Location: Duisburg, Germany
- Dates: 23–26 August
- Competitors: 25 from 25 nations
- Winning time: 3:54.864

Medalists
gold medal	Alyssa Bull	Australia
silver medal	Justyna Iskrzycka	Poland
bronze medal	Eszter Rendessy	Hungary

The women's K-1 1000 metres competition at the 2023 ICF Canoe Sprint World Championships in Duisburg took place in Sportpark Duisburg.

== Schedule ==
The schedule is as follows:

Date	Time	Round
Wednesday 23 August 2023	17:20	Heats
Thursday 24 August 2023	16:20	Semifinals
Saturday 26 August 2023	10:47	Final B
Saturday 26 August 2023	10:54	Final A

== Results ==
=== Heats ===
The fastest boat in each heat advanced directly to the final. The next six fastest boats in each heat advanced to the semifinal

==== Heat 1 ====
Rank	Canoeist	Country	Time	Notes
1	Justyna Iskrzycka	Poland	4:11.565	QA
2	Mia Medved	Slovenia	4:15.796	QS
3	Kitty Schiphorst Preuper	Netherlands	4:20.217	QS
4	Hediyeh Kazemi	Iran	4:20.639	QS
5	Oona Vasko	Finland	4:23.307	QS
6	Aleksandra Mihalashvili	Bulgaria	4:26.592	QS
7	Aya Ferfad	Algeria	4:44.878	QS
8	Angie Rodríguez	Colombia	4:45.614	
9	Carolina Daibert Moncorvo	Honduras	4:53.451	

==== Heat 2 ====
Rank	Canoeist	Country	Time	Notes
1	Alyssa Bull	Australia	4:11.123	QA
2	Eszter Rendessy	Hungary	4:17.838	QS
3	Laura Pedruelo	Spain	4:18.647	QS
4	Kristina Bedeč	Serbia	4:24.312	QS
5	Elise Erland	Norway	4:29.583	QS
6	Elizaveta Fedorova	Estonia	4:29.861	QS
7	Katrina Smiltniece	Latvia	4:30.709	QS
8	Soniya Devi Phairembam	India	4:38.319	
9	Mehana Leafchild	United States	4:39.344	

==== Heat 3 ====
Rank	Canoeist	Country	Time	Notes
1	Julia Lagerstam	Sweden	4:11.946	QA
2	Stella Sukhanova	Kazakhstan	4:15.737	QS
3	Melissa Johnson	Great Britain	4:21.338	QS
4	Ana Paula Vergutz	Brazil	4:22.243	QS
5	Elena Ricchiero	Italy	4:27.709	QS
6	Darya Budouskaya	Israel	4:43.265	QS
7	Carmen Morawietz	Romania	4:48.715	QS

=== Semifinal ===
The fastest three boats in each semi advanced to the A final. The next four fastest boats in each semi and best 8th advanced to the final B.

==== Semifinal 1 ====
Rank	Canoeist	Country	Time	Notes
1	Laura Pedruelo	Spain	4:05.487	QA
2	Ana Paula Vergutz	Brazil	4:05.986	QA
3	Hediyeh Kazemi	Iran	4:06.762	QA
4	Melissa Johnson	Great Britain	4:10.353	QB
5	Elise Erland	Norway	4:10.362	QB
6	Aleksandra Mihalashvili	Bulgaria	4:11.056	QB
7	Darya Budouskaya	Israel	4:13.377	QB
8	Mia Medved	Slovenia	4:14.873	qB
9	Katrina Smiltniece	Latvia	4:18.327	

==== Semifinal 2 ====
Rank	Canoeist	Country	Time	Notes
1	Eszter Rendessy	Hungary	4:02.079	QA
2	Stella Sukhanova	Kazakhstan	4:04.635	QA
3	Kristina Bedeč	Serbia	4:05.700	QA
4	Kitty Schiphorst Preuper	Netherlands	4:07.178	QB
5	Elena Ricchiero	Italy	4:10.311	QB
6	Elizaveta Fedorova	Estonia	4:12.018	QB
7	Oona Vasko	Finland	4:12.171	QB
8	Carmen Morawietz	Romania	4:35.500	
9	Aya Ferfad	Algeria	4:45.394	

=== Finals ===
==== Final B ====
Competitors in this final raced for positions 10 to 18.

Rank	Canoeist	Country	Time
1	Mia Medved	Slovenia	4:08.461
2	Elena Ricchiero	Italy	4:09.699
3	Elizaveta Fedorova	Estonia	4:10.577
4	Aleksandra Mihalashvili	Bulgaria	4:11.099
5	Melissa Johnson	Great Britain	4:12.252
6	Darya Budouskaya	Israel	4:12.359
7	Kitty Schiphorst Preuper	Netherlands	4:13.997
8	Oona Vasko	Finland	4:15.127
9	Elise Erland	Norway	4:16.779

==== Final A ====
Competitors raced for positions 1 to 9, with medals going to the top three.

Rank	Canoeist	Country	Time
1st place, gold medalist(s)	Alyssa Bull	Australia	3:54.864
2nd place, silver medalist(s)	Justyna Iskrzycka	Poland	3:56.663
3rd place, bronze medalist(s)	Eszter Rendessy	Hungary	3:57.556
4	Laura Pedruelo	Spain	3:59.237
5	Julia Lagerstam	Sweden	4:00.815
6	Ana Paula Vergutz	Brazil	4:02.970
7	Kristina Bedeč	Serbia	4:04.908
8	Stella Sukhanova	Kazakhstan	4:05.667
9	Hediyeh Kazemi	Iran	4:11.657
