= São Tomé and Príncipe at the 2010 Summer Youth Olympics =

- IOC code: STP
- NOC: Comité Olímpico de São Tomé e Príncipe

in Singapore
- Competitors: 4 in 3 sports
- Flag bearer: Vanderley Cabral de Assuncao Silva

Summer Youth Olympics appearances
- 2010; 2014; 2018

São Tomé and Príncipe competed at the 2010 Summer Youth Olympics, the inaugural Youth Olympic Games, held in Singapore from 14 August to 26 August 2010.

== Athletics ==
=== Boys ===
Track and road events

Athletes	Event	Qualification		Final	
Athletes	Event	Result	Rank	Result	Rank
Ailton Da Costa Oliveira	Boys' 100m	12.11	30 qD	DNS	

== Canoeing ==
Boys

Athlete	Event	Time Trial		Round 1	Round 2 (Rep)	Round 3	Round 4	Round 5	Final
Athlete	Event	Time	Rank	Round 1	Round 2 (Rep)	Round 3	Round 4	Round 5	Final
Vanderley Cabral de Assuncao Silva	Boys’ K1 Slalom	DNF		did not advance					
Vanderley Cabral de Assuncao Silva	Boys’ K1 Sprint	1:45.22	19	Garica (ESP); L 1:42.15-1:33.27	Stowman (RSA); L 1:44.31-1:40.35	did not advance			

Girls

Athlete	Event	Time Trial		Round 1	Round 2 (Rep)	Round 3	Round 4	Round 5	Final
Athlete	Event	Time	Rank	Round 1	Round 2 (Rep)	Round 3	Round 4	Round 5	Final
Genanilze Almeida Soares de Ceita	Girls’ K1 Slalom	2:11.99	23	Novak (SLO); L 2:11.50-1:39.14	Aliaksandra Hryshyna (BLR); L 2:40.07-1:54.01	did not advance			
Genanilze Almeida Soares de Ceita	Girls’ K1 Sprint	2:13.88	19	Podolskaya (RUS); L 2:19.89-1:41.22	Villumsen (DEN); L 2:15.21-1:47.31	did not advance			

== Taekwondo ==
Athlete	Event	Preliminary	Quarterfinal	Semifinal	Final	Rank
Sara Neves Bolivar	Girls' -55kg	Thanh Thao Nguyen (VIE); L KO R1 0:58	did not advance			9
