= Amalie Thomsen =

Danish canoeist

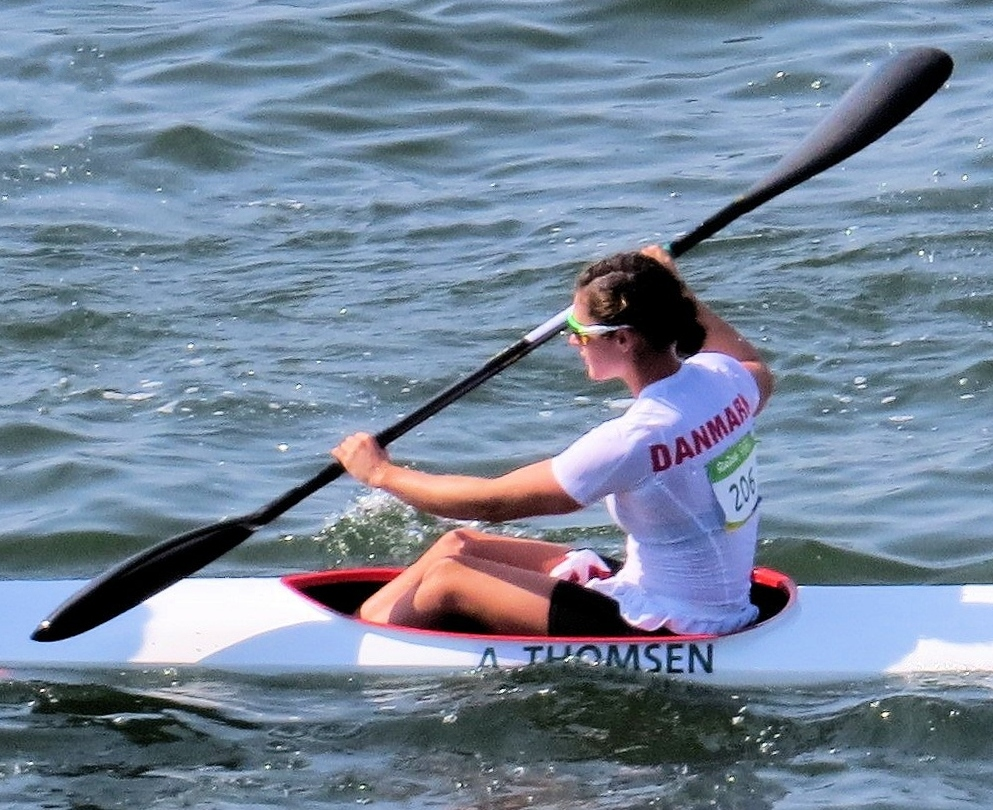
- Thomsen at the 2016 Olympics

Personal information
- Born: 12 September 1994 (age 31) Aalborg, Denmark
- Height: 166 cm (5 ft 5 in)
- Weight: 60 kg (132 lb)

Sport
- Sport: Canoe sprint
- Club: Limfjorden Kayak Club
- Coached by: Zoltán Bakó

Amalie Thomsen (born 12 September 1994) is a Danish canoeist. She competed in the K-2 500 m and K-4 500 m events at the 2016 Summer Olympics and finished 12th and 6th, respectively.
