= Morocco at the 2010 Summer Youth Olympics =

- IOC code: MAR
- NOC: Moroccan Olympic Committee; Arabic: اللجنة الأولمبية الوطنية المغربية
- Website: www.marocolympique.org (in French)

in Singapore
- Competitors: 7 in 3 sports
- Flag bearer: Zineb El Hazzaz
- Medals Ranked 84th: Gold 0 Silver 0 Bronze 1 Total 1

Summer Youth Olympics appearances (overview)
- 2010; 2014; 2018; 2026

Morocco participated in the 2010 Summer Youth Olympics in Singapore.

== Medalists ==
Medal	Name	Sport	Event	Date
Bronze	Hicham Siguini	Athletics	Boys' 3000m	22 Aug

== Athletics ==
=== Boys ===
Track and Road Events

Athletes	Event	Qualification		Final	
Athletes	Event	Result	Rank	Result	Rank
Abdelhadi Labali	Boys’ 1000m	2:25.23	5 Q	DSQ	
Hicham Sigueni	Boys’ 3000m	8:12.95	3 Q	8:08.55	Bronze medal

Field Events

Athletes	Event	Qualification		Final	
Athletes	Event	Result	Rank	Result	Rank
Younes Kabil	Boys’ Discus Throw	NM qB		48.85	14

=== Girls ===
Track and Road Events

Athletes	Event	Qualification		Final	
Athletes	Event	Result	Rank	Result	Rank
Manal El Behraoui	Girls’ 1000m	DNF qB		2:53.87	18
Ouafa Tijani	Girls’ 2000m Steeplechase	7:17.77	12 qB	6:54.10	9

== Canoeing ==
Girls

Athlete	Event	Time Trial		Round 1	Round 2 (Rep)	Round 3	Round 4	Round 5	Final
Athlete	Event	Time	Rank	Round 1	Round 2 (Rep)	Round 3	Round 4	Round 5	Final
Kawtar Rimi	Girls’ K1 Slalom	2:06.26	21	Zasterova (CZE); L 2:09.79-1:38.05	Monleon (ESP); L 2:05.77-1:57.60	Did not advance			
Kawtar Rimi	Girls’ K1 Sprint	DNF		Did not advance					

== Swimming ==
Zineb El Hazaz, while the flag bearer was not registered in a swimming event and therefore did not compete at the olympics.

Athletes	Event	Heat		Semifinal		Final	
Athletes	Event	Time	Position	Time	Position	Time	Position
Bilal Achalhi	Boys’ 100m Backstroke	1:01.70	27	Did not advance			
Bilal Achalhi	Boys’ 200m Backstroke	DSQ				Did not advance	
