= Athletics at the 2026 Summer Youth Olympics – Women's 200 metres =

Women's 200 metres athletics event at the 2026 Summer Youth Olympics

Women's 200 metres at the IV Summer Youth Olympic Games
- Venue: Complexe Iba Mar Diop
- Date: 10 November
- Competitors: 24 from 24 nations
- Winning time: 23.35

Medalists
1st place, gold medalist(s)		Patricia Sine	Dominican Republic
2nd place, silver medalist(s)		Tyra Fenton	Antigua and Barbuda
3rd place, bronze medalist(s)		Xinxuan Chen	China

The women's 200 metres event at the 2026 Summer Youth Olympics was held on 10 November at the Complexe Iba Mar Diop in Dakar, Senegal. The competition consisted of semi-finals and a final. The first four athletes in each semi-final, along with the next fastest athlete, advanced to the final.

Dominican Republic's Patricia Sine won the gold medal in 23.35 seconds, finishing just 0.01 seconds ahead of Tyra Fenton of Antigua and Barbuda. Xinxuan Chen of China won the bronze medal.

== Schedule ==
All times are local (UTC±0).

Date	Time	Round
10 November	15:45	Semi-finals
10 November	17:40	Final

== Results ==
=== Semi-finals ===
The semi-finals were held on 10 November. The first four athletes in each heat (Q) and the next fastest athlete (q) qualified for the final.

==== Phase Summary ====
Rank	Bib	Athlete	Nation	Semi-final	Position	Result	Notes
1	106	Tyra Fenton	Antigua and Barbuda	SF1	1	23.63	Q
2	145	Patricia Sine	Dominican Republic	SF2	1	23.64	Q
3	170	Haddy Jarju	The Gambia	SF1	2	24.07	Q
4	137	Rihana Mora	Costa Rica	SF1	3	24.29	Q
5	127	Xinxuan Chen	China	SF2	2	24.39	Q
6	188	Giorgia Castiglione	Italy	SF1	4	25.40	Q
7	141	Banessa Velazco	Cuba	SF2	3	26.36	Q
8	252	Aliyaa Nicette	Seychelles	SF2	4	26.86	Q
9	172	Nino Gogitidze	Georgia	SF2	5	27.44	q
10	211	Laura Jauslin	Madagascar	SF1	5	27.46	
11	262	Ielzica Leite Vaz	São Tomé and Príncipe	SF2	6	27.77	
12	176	Mamaissata Camara	Guinea	SF2	7	28.47	
13	266	Jana Mhalla	Syria	SF1	6	28.94	
14	232	Mysha Cain	Nauru	Re-run	1	29.26	
15	152	Florence Masumbe	Refugee Olympic Team	SF1	7	29.54	
16	171	Aminata Balde	Guinea-Bissau	SF2		DNF	

=== Final ===
The final was held on 10 November at 17:40. The race was run with a wind reading of +0.3 m/s.

Rank	Lane	Athlete	Nation	Result	Remark
1st place, gold medalist(s)	5	Patricia Sine	Dominican Republic	23.35	PB
2nd place, silver medalist(s)	8	Tyra Fenton	Antigua and Barbuda	23.36	
3rd place, bronze medalist(s)	6	Xinxuan Chen	China	24.03	
4	7	Haddy Jarju	The Gambia	24.29	
5	4	Rihana Mora	Costa Rica	24.33	
6	9	Giorgia Castiglione	Italy	25.24	
7	1	Aliyaa Nicette	Seychelles	26.80	PB
8	3	Banessa Velazco	Cuba	27.01	
9	2	Nino Gogitidze	Georgia	27.26	
