= Varvara Baranova =

Russian canoeist (born 1996)

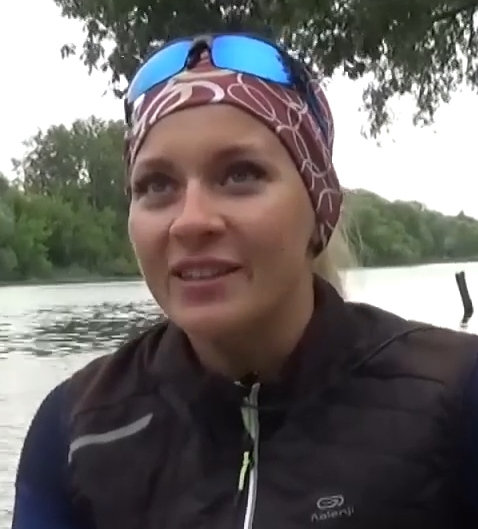

Personal information
- Full name: Varvara Alekseyevna Baranova
- Born: 13 February 1996 (age 30) Ulyanovsk, Russia

Sport
- Sport: Canoe sprint

Varvara Alekseyevna Baranova (Russian: Варвара Алексеевна Баранова; born 13 February 1996) is a Russian canoeist. She competed in the women's K-2 500 metres event at the 2020 Summer Olympics.
