= Canoeing at the 2015 Pan American Games – Women's slalom K-1 =

Women's slalom K-1 at the 2015 Pan American Games
- Venue: Minden Wild Water Preserve
- Dates: July 18–19
- Competitors: 8 from 8 nations
- Winning time: 97.92

Medalists
Gold medal	Jazmyne Denhollander	Canada
Silver medal	Ana Sátila	Brazil
Bronze medal	Ashley Nee	United States

The women's slalom K-1 canoeing event at the 2015 Pan American Games will be held between the 18 and 19 of July at the Minden Wild Water Preserve in Minden Hills. At the Pan American Sports Organization's 2013 general assembly in Jamaica, canoe slalom competitions were added to the program. This will be the first time slalom has been staged at the Pan American Games. Furthermore, women will also compete in canoe races for the first time ever in both disciplines. The winners of the four canoe slalom competitions (besides the C-1 women event, which is not an Olympic event) will qualify for the 2016 Summer Olympics in Rio de Janeiro, Brazil. If the host nation of the Olympics (Brazil) wins the event, the runner up will qualify instead.

== Schedule ==
The following is the competition schedule for the event:

All times are Eastern Daylight Time (UTC−4)

Date	Time	Round
July 18, 2015	14:17	Heat–Run 1
July 18, 2015	15:19	Heat–Run 2
July 19, 2015	14:51	Semi-final
July 19, 2015	17:49	Final

== Results ==
=== Heats ===
Rank	Name	Nation	Run 1			Run 2			Best	Notes
Rank	Name	Nation	Time	Pen.	Total	Time	Pen.	Total	Best	Notes
1	Ana Sátila	Brazil	94.14	0	94.14	106.06	6	112.06	94.14	Q
2	Ashley Nee	United States	97.71	2	99.71	93.58	52	145.58	99.71	Q
3	Jazmyne Denhollander	Canada	98.07	2	100.07	99.03	6	105.03	100.07	Q
4	Maria Luz Cassini	Argentina	110.51	0	110.51	114.90	106	220.90	110.51	Q
5	Sofía Reinoso	Mexico	137.22	50	187.22	127.96	56	183.96	183.96	Q
6	Siranush Mamed Paredes	Venezuela	171.96	24	195.96	219.53	360	579.53	195.96	Q
7	Ana Fernández	Paraguay	188.20	206	394.20			DNS	394.20	Q
8	Maritza Gajardo	Chile	255.58	308	563.58	221.72	212	433.72	433.72	

=== Semifinal ===
Rank	Name	Nation	Time	Pen.	Total	Notes
1	Ashley Nee	United States	96.59	2	98.59	Q
2	Ana Sátila	Brazil	99.43	2	101.43	Q
3	Jazmyne Denhollander	Canada	111.42	4	115.42	Q
4	Maria Luz Cassini	Argentina	132.77	10	142.77	Q
5	Sofía Reinoso	Mexico	141.20	12	153.20	Q
6	Ana Fernández	Paraguay	160.98	110	270.98	Q
7	Siranush Mamed Paredes	Venezuela	155.65	664	819.65	

=== Final ===
Rank	Name	Nation	Time	Pen.	Total	Notes
1st place, gold medalist(s)	Jazmyne Denhollander	Canada	97.92	0	97.92	
2nd place, silver medalist(s)	Ana Sátila	Brazil	97.94	0	97.94	
3rd place, bronze medalist(s)	Ashley Nee	United States	97.95	0	97.95	
4	Maria Luz Cassini	Argentina	119.29	4	123.29	
5	Sofía Reinoso	Mexico	133.34	2	135.34	
	Ana Fernández	Paraguay			DNF	
