= Paul Broekx =

Belgian canoeist (born 1953)

Paul Broekx (Neerpelt, 5 April 1953) is a Belgian canoe sprinter who competed in the mid-1970s. He was eliminated in the semifinals of the K-4 1000 m event at the 1976 Summer Olympics in Montreal.

His brother Jos Broekx and his niece Lize Broekx also competed as canoe sprinters.
