= Tabea Medert =

German canoeist

Personal information
- Nationality: German
- Born: 16 June 1994 (age 32)

Sport
- Country: Germany
- Sport: Sprint kayak
- Event: K–2 1000 m
- Club: Kanu Club Potsdam
Medal record
Women's canoe sprint
Representing Germany
World Championships
Silver medal – second place	2017 Račice	K-1 5000 m
Silver medal – second place	2017 Račice	K-2 1000 m
Silver medal – second place	2019 Szeged	K-1 5000 m
Silver medal – second place	2019 Szeged	K-2 1000 m
European Championships
Bronze medal – third place	2017 Plovdiv	K-1 5000 m
Bronze medal – third place	2017 Plovdiv	K-2 1000 m

Tabea Medert (born 16 June 1994) is a German sprint canoeist.

She won a medal at the 2019 ICF Canoe Sprint World Championships.
