= Seychelles at the 2026 Summer Youth Olympics =

- Flag of Seychelles
- IOC code: SEY
- NOC: Seychelles Olympic and Commonwealth Games Association

in Dakar, Senegal October 31, 2026 – November 13, 2026
- Competitors: 4 in 3 sports
- Flag bearers: Dorianne Bristol & Franco Zialor
- Medals: Gold 0 Silver 0 Bronze 0 Total 0

Summer Youth Olympics appearances
- 2010; 2014; 2018; 2026

Seychelles competed at the 2026 Summer Youth Olympics in Dakar, Senegal from October 31 to November 13, 2026. This marked Seychelles's fourth appearance at the Youth Olympics, after making its debut in 2010.

Swimmers Angela Chicumbe and Lazaro Menete served as the flag bearers for the opening ceremony.

== Competitors ==
The following is the list of number of competitors participating at the Games per sport/discipline.

Sport	Men	Women	Total
Athletics	0	1	1
Boxing	1	0	1
Swimming	1	1	2
Total	2	2	4

== Athletics ==
Seychelles entered one female athlete.

=== Track & road events ===
Women

Athlete	Event	Semifinal		Final	
Athlete	Event	Result	Rank	Result	Rank
Aliyaa Nicette	200 m				

== Boxing ==
Seychelles entered one male athlete in the −60 kg category.

Men

Athlete	Weight	Round of 16	Quarterfinals	Semifinals	Final	
Athlete	Weight	Opposition Result	Opposition Result	Opposition Result	Opposition Result	Rank
Franco Zialor	–60 kg					

== Swimming ==
Seychelles entered two swimmers, one male and one female.

Athlete	Event	Heat		Final	
Athlete	Event	Time	Rank	Time	Rank
Nasri Jean-Baptiste	50 m freestyle				
Nasri Jean-Baptiste	100 m freestyle				
Nasri Jean-Baptiste	800 m freestyle				
Nasri Jean-Baptiste	50 m backstroke				
Dorianne Bristol	50 m freestyle				
Dorianne Bristol	100 m freestyle				
Dorianne Bristol	50 m backstroke				
Dorianne Bristol	50 m butterfly				
