= Anastasiya Horlova =

Ukrainian canoeist

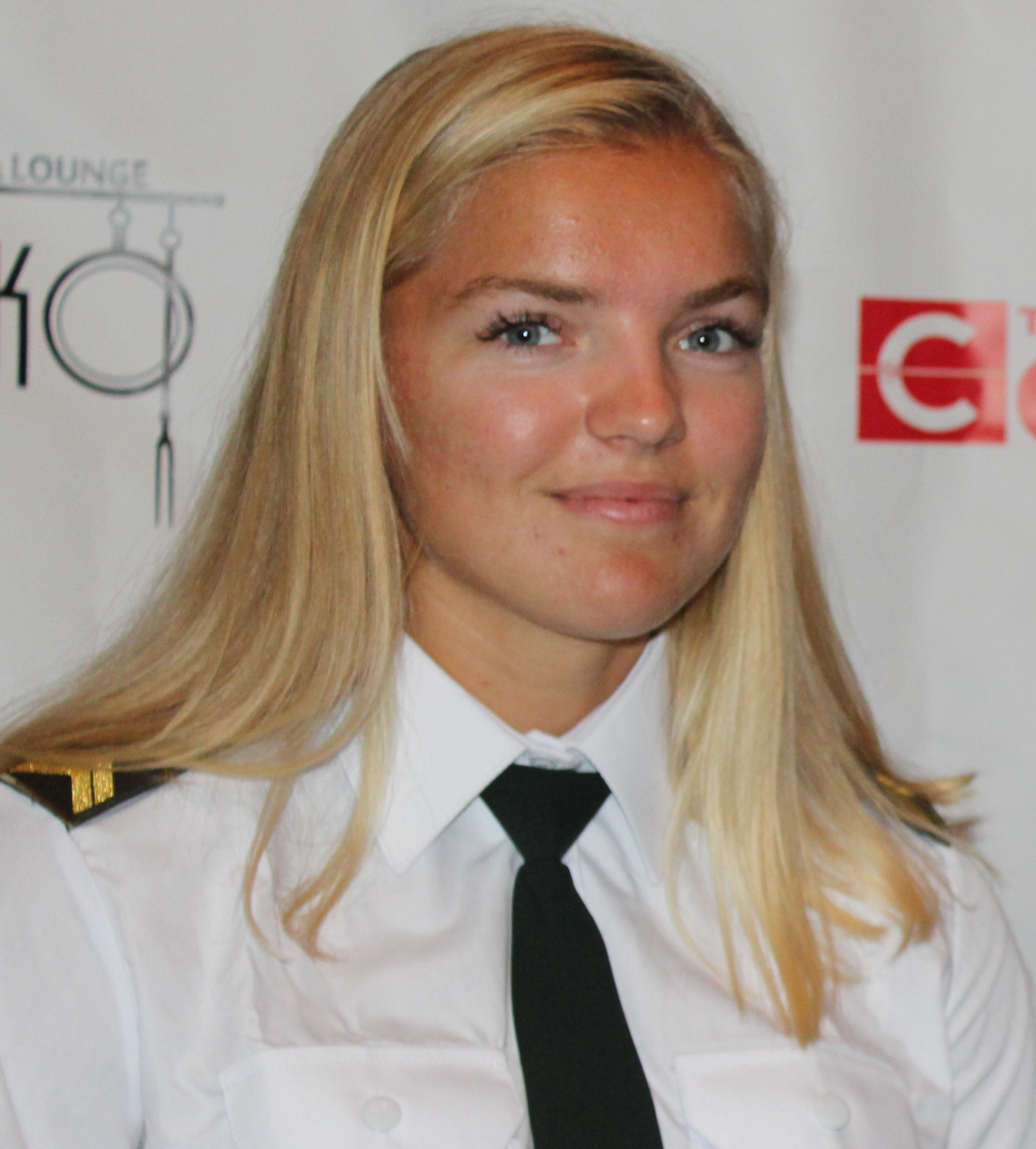

Personal information
- Nationality: Ukrainian
- Born: Анастасія Горлова

Sport
- Country: Ukraine
- Sport: Canoe sprint
Medal record
Representing Ukraine
World Championships
Bronze medal – third place	2018 Montemor-o-Velho	K-2 200 m
European Championships
Gold medal – first place	2017 Plovdiv	K-2 200m

Anastasiya Horlova is a Ukrainian canoeist. At the 2017 European championships in Plovdiv, Bulgaria, she became in pair with Mariia Kichasova European champion in K-2 200m.

She is a student of Lviv State School of Physical Culture.
