= Melanie Gebhardt =

German sprint canoeist

Personal information
- Nationality: German
- Born: 25 January 1994 (age 32) Germany
- Height: 1.74 m (5 ft 9 in)
- Weight: 72 kg (159 lb)

Sport
- Country: Germany
- Sport: Canoe sprint
- Event: Kayaking
- Club: SC DHfK Leipzig
Medal record
World Championships
Bronze medal – third place	2018 Montemor-o-Velho	K-2 1000 m

Melanie Gebhardt (born 1994) is a German sprint canoeist.

She participated at the 2018 ICF Canoe Sprint World Championships, winning a medal.
