= Justyna Iskrzycka =

Polish canoeist (born 1997)

Personal information
- Nationality: Polish
- Born: 7 November 1997 (age 28) Bielsko-Biała, Poland
- Height: 1.71 m (5 ft 7 in)

Sport
- Country: Poland
- Sport: Sprint kayak
- Event(s): K-1 1000 m, K-2 1000 m
- Club: AZS-AWF Katowice
Medal record
Women's canoe sprint
Representing Poland
Olympic Games
Bronze medal – third place	2020 Tokyo	K-4 500 m
World Championships
Silver medal – second place	2018 Montemor-o-Velho	K-2 1000 m
Silver medal – second place	2019 Szeged	K-1 1000 m
Silver medal – second place	2023 Duisburg	K-1 1000 m
Bronze medal – third place	2017 Račice	K-2 1000 m
European Championships
Gold medal – first place	2018 Belgrade	K-2 1000 m
Gold medal – first place	2024 Szeged	K-1 1000 m
Silver medal – second place	2022 Munich	K-1 1000 m
Silver medal – second place	2022 Munich	K-2 1000 m
Silver medal – second place	2024 Szeged	K-2 500 m
Silver medal – second place	2024 Szeged	K-4 500 m

Justyna Iskrzycka (born 7 November 1997) is a Polish sprint canoeist. At the 2020 Summer Olympics, she won a bronze medal in Women's K-4 500 metres. At the 2019 European Games, she won a bronze medal

== Career ==
She participated at the 2018 ICF Canoe Sprint World Championships, winning a medal. She competed at the 2017 ICF Canoe Sprint World Championships, 2018 ICF Canoe Sprint World Championships, and 2019 ICF Canoe Sprint World Championships.
