= Genevieve Orton =

Canadian canoeist

Medal record

Women's canoe sprint

World Championships
Bronze medal – third place	2009 Dartmouth	K-1 4 x 200 m

Genevieve Orton (born May 13, 1984) is a Canadian sprint kayaker who has competed since the late 2000s. She won a bronze medal in the K-1 4 x 200 m event at the 2009 ICF Canoe Sprint World Championships in Dartmouth. On June 27, 2016 Orton was nominated to Canada's Olympic team.
