= Lize Broekx =

Belgian canoeist (born 1992)

Personal information
- Nationality: Belgian
- Born: 5 April 1992 (age 34) Neerpelt, Belgium
- Height: 175 cm (5 ft 9 in)
- Weight: 60 kg (132 lb)

Sport
- Country: Belgium
- Sport: Sprint kayak
- Club: Neerpeltse Watersport Club
Medal record
Representing Belgium
Women's sprint kayak
World Championships
Bronze medal – third place	2021 Copenhagen	K-2 500 m
Bronze medal – third place	2022 Dartmouth	K-2 500 m
European Championships
Silver medal – second place	2022 Munich	K-2 500 m
Bronze medal – third place	2018 Belgrade	K-2 500 m
European U23 Championships
Bronze medal – third place	2015 Pitesti	K2 500m
Women's canoe marathon
World Championships
Gold medal – first place	2010 Banyoles-Girona	Junior K-2

Lize Broekx (born 5 April 1992) is a Belgian sprint canoeist. She competed in the women's K-1 500 metres and the K-2 500 metres events at the 2020 and 2024 Summer Olympics.

Her father (Erik) and her uncles Paul and Jos Broekx also used to compete as sprint canoeists.

== Personal life ==
Lize Broekx hails from Belgian kayaking royalty: her grandfather, Harry Broekx, was a founding member in 1945 of the Neerpeltse Watersport Club on the Bocholt–Herentals Canal in Pelt in the Belgian province of Limburg and became its first president. When he died in 1992, her father, Erik, took over the presidency. Her uncle Jos Broekx participated in three Summer Olympics (Munich, Montreal and Moscow), and her other uncle Paul Broekx participated in the 1976 Summer Olympics in Montreal, Canada.

She holds a Master of Science in Biochemistry and biotechnology from the KU Leuven.

== Career ==
In September 2010 she, together with Femke Weckx, won the gold medal in the women's junior K-2 at the 2010 ICF Canoe Marathon World Championships on the Lake of Banyoles in Spain. It was the first ever world title by a member of the Neerpeltse Watersport Club in its 65-year existence.

Having formed a duo in the women's K-2 with Hermien Peters since 2012, she won a first international medal at the senior level in an olympic discipline by winning the bronze medal in the K-2 500 metres at the 2018 European Canoe Sprint Championships in Belgrad, Serbia.

She qualified for the women's K-2 500 metres, and women's K-1 500 metres events at the 2020 Summer Olympics in Tokyo, Japan by finishing 4th in the A final of the women's K-2 500 metres at the 2019 ICF Canoe Sprint World Championships in Szeged, Hungary. At the Olympics, she finished 21st resp. 9th in the women's K-1 500 metres and K-2 500 metres.

After the COVID-19 pandemic disrupted the kayaking seasons 2020 and 2021, she and Hermien Peters showed that they belonged henceforth to the world's best by winning in quick succession two bronzes resp. a silver medal at the 2021 ICF Canoe Sprint World Championships in Copenhague, Denmark, the 2022 ICF Canoe Sprint World Championships in Dartmouth, Canada and the 2022 Canoe Sprint European Championships in Munich, Germany.

In 2023, she qualified for the 2024 Summer Olympics in Paris, France by finishing just outside the medals in 4th place in the K-2 500 metres at the 2023 ICF Canoe Sprint World Championships in Duisburg, Germany. At those 2024 Summer Olympics, she finished 5th in the women's K-2 500 metres and 14th in the Women's K-1 500 metres.

== Awards ==
In 2011 she received the trophy of most promising young athlete in the Belgian province of Limburg, beating among others Luca Brecel.
