= Caroline Arft =

German canoeist (born 1996)

Personal information
- Nationality: German
- Born: 14 January 1996 (age 30)

Sport
- Sport: Canoe sprint
Medal record
World Championships
| Bronze medal – third place | 2022 Dartmouth | K-2 Mix 500 m |

Caroline Arft (born 14 January 1996) is a German canoeist. She competed in the women's K-2 500 metres event at the 2020 Summer Olympics.
