= Réka Hagymási =

Hungarian canoeist

Personal information
- Nationality: Hungarian
- Born: 29 July 1993 (age 32) Budapest, Hungary
- Height: 1.55 m (5 ft 1 in)
- Weight: 51 kg (112 lb)

Sport
- Country: Hungary
- Sport: Sprint kayak
- Event: K–2 1000 m
Medal record
Women's canoe sprint
Representing Hungary
World Championships
Gold medal – first place	2017 Račice	K-2 200 m
Gold medal – first place	2019 Szeged	K-2 1000 m
European Championships
Gold medal – first place	2017 Plovdiv	K-2 1000 m

Réka Hagymási (born 29 July 1993) is a Hungarian sprint canoeist.

She won a medal at the 2019 ICF Canoe Sprint World Championships.
