= Jazmyne Denhollander =

Canadian canoeist

Personal information
- Born: January 8, 1994 (age 32) Chilliwack, British Columbia, Canada
- Height: 1.80 m (5 ft 11 in)
- Weight: 61 kg (134 lb)

Sport
- Sport: Canoe slalom
- Event: K1
- Club: Chilliwack Center of Excellence
Medal record
Women's canoe slalom
Representing Canada
Pan American Games
Gold medal – first place	2015 Toronto	K1

Jazmyne Denhollander (born January 8, 1994, in Chilliwack, British Columbia) is a Canadian slalom canoeist.

== Career ==
She made her ICF World Cup debut in 2011, winning several medals at World Cup and international level. She finished 5th in the K1 event at the 2010 Youth Olympic Games. She then placed 8th at the 2012 ICF World Junior Championships in K1.
