= Alyssa Buck =

Australian canoeist

Personal information
- Born: Alyssa Bull; 1 December 1995 (age 30) Buderim, Australia
- Height: 1.73 m (5 ft 8 in)
- Weight: 65 kg (143 lb)

Sport
- Country: Australia
- Sport: Canoe sprint
Medal record
World Championships
Gold medal – first place	2022 Dartmouth	K-1 1000 m
Gold medal – first place	2022 Dartmouth	K-2 Mix 500 m
Gold medal – first place	2023 Duisburg	K-1 1000 m
Silver medal – second place	2022 Dartmouth	K-4 500 m
Silver medal – second place	2023 Duisburg	K-2 Mix 500 m
Silver medal – second place	2025 Milan	K-1 1000 m

Alyssa Buck (née Bull; born 1 December 1995) is an Australian canoeist. She represented Australia in three Olympic Games, 2016, 2020 and 2024.

== Early years ==
At the age of 16 Buck started ski paddling for surf lifesaving. In 2012 she was the Under 17 Australian Ironwoman Champion. Inspired after watching her surf lifesaving idol Naomi Flood compete at London 2012, Buck took up kayaking.

Buck was also surf lifesaving and competed in the 2012/13 and 2013/14 Ironwoman series. Along with kayaking, she's a full-time firefighter.

== Achievements ==
Buck achieved her childhood dream when she made her Olympic debut at the 2016 Summer Olympics in Rio . She competed in the women's K-2 500 metres event .

Buck also competed with K-2 partner Alyce Wood. The pair won both K-2 selection events, defeating their idol Naomi Flood and her partner Olympian Jo Brigden-Jones. This was a major upset. They then made the A-Finals of the K-2 500m by finishing third in their semi-final. In the final they came eighth and finished with a time of 1min 51.915sec.

At the Tokyo 2020 Olympics, Buck was unable to make the final of the women's K-1 500m being knocked out in the semi-final. Bull paired with Alyce Wood in the Women's K-2 500m. They made it to the final and finished fifth.

In Paris 2024, Buck got to the Women's K-2 500m final paired with Ella Beere, finishing in seventh, and along with the rest of Australia's K-4 500m, finished eighth in the final.
