= Hermien Peters =

Belgian canoeist (born 1994)

Personal information
- Born: 19 November 1994 (age 31) Hechtel-Eksel, Belgium
- Height: 172 cm (5 ft 8 in)
- Weight: 99 kg (218 lb)

Sport
- Country: Belgium
- Sport: Sprint kayak
- Club: Neerpeltse Watersport Club
Medal record
Women's sprint kayak
Representing Belgium
World Championships
Bronze medal – third place	2021 Copenhagen	K-2 500 m
Bronze medal – third place	2022 Dartmouth	K-2 500 m
European Championships
Silver medal – second place	2022 Munich	K-2 500 m
Bronze medal – third place	2018 Belgrade	K-1 5000 m
Bronze medal – third place	2018 Belgrade	K-2 500 m
World U23 Championships
Silver medal – second place	2016 Minsk	K1 500m
European U23 Championships
Gold medal – first place	2016 Plovdiv	K1 500m
Gold medal – first place	2017 Belgrade	K1 500m
Silver medal – second place	2015 Pitesti	K1 500m
Silver medal – second place	2016 Plovdiv	K1 200m
Bronze medal – third place	2015 Pitesti	K2 500m
World Junior Championships
Silver medal – second place	2011 Brandenburg	K1 500m
Silver medal – second place	2011 Brandenburg	K1 1000m
European Junior Championships
Gold medal – first place	2012 Montemor-o-Velho	K1 500m
Gold medal – first place	2012 Montemor-o-Velho	K1 1000m
Gold medal – first place	2011 Zagreb	K1 1000m
Summer Youth Olympics
Bronze medal – third place	2010 Singapore	Girls' canoe sprint

Hermien Peters (born 19 November 1994) is a Belgian sprint canoeist who competes in international elite events. She is a Youth Olympic bronze medalist, three time World silver medalist.

== Personal life ==
Peters was born in Hechtel-Eksel and is the older sister of Artuur Peters who competed at the 2016 Summer Olympics.

== Career ==
Peters first came to national prominence winning a bronze medal in the Girls' canoe sprint at the 2010 Summer Youth Olympics in Singapore. This was followed in rapid succession by a slew of medals in Junior and U23 World and European championships.

In 2011, she won the K-1 1000 metres at the European Junior Canoe Sprint Championships in Zagreb, Croatia. Later that month, she won silver medals in the K-1 500 and K-1 1000 metres at the World Junior Canoe Sprint Championships in Brandenburg an der Havel, Germany.

In 2012, she won both the K-1 500 and K-1 1000 metres titles at the European Junior Canoe Sprint Championships in Montemor-o-Velho, Portugal.

In July 2016, four years after winning the European title K-1 500 metres as a junior, she crowned herself European champion over that same distance in the U23 category at the 2016 European U23 Canoe Sprint Championships in Plovdiv, Bulgaria. Two days later, she added a silver medal to her collection finishing 2nd in the K-1 200 metres at the same championships. At the end of that month of July, at the World U23 Canoe Sprint Championships in Minsk, Belarus, she won silver in the K-1 500 metres.

In June 2017, she prolonged her European title K-1 500 metres at the 2017 European U23 Canoe Sprint Championships in Belgrad, Serbia.

Having formed a duo K-2 with Lize Broekx since 2012, she won a first international medal at the senior level in an olympic discipline by winning the bronze medal in the K-2 500 metres at the 2018 European Canoe Sprint Championships in Belgrad, Serbia. At the same European championships, she added a bronze medal to her tally by finishing third in the non-olympic discipline of the K-1 5000 metres.

She qualified for the women's K-2 500 metres, and women's K-1 500 metres events at the 2020 Summer Olympics in Tokyo, Japan by finishing 4th in the A final of the women's K-2 500 metres at the 2019 ICF Canoe Sprint World Championships in Szeged, Hungary. At the Olympics, she finished 6th resp. 9th in the women's K-1 500 metres and K-2 500 metres.

After the COVID-19 pandemic disrupted the kayaking seasons 2020 and 2021, Peeters and Broekx showed that they belonged henceforth to the world's best by winning in quick succession two bronzes resp. a silver medal at the 2021 ICF Canoe Sprint World Championships in Copenhague, Denmark, the 2022 ICF Canoe Sprint World Championships in Dartmouth, Canada and the 2022 Canoe Sprint European Championships in Munich, Germany.

In 2023, Peters and Broekx qualified for the 2024 Summer Olympics in Paris, France by finishing just outside the medals in 4th place in the K-2 500 metres at the 2023 ICF Canoe Sprint World Championships in Duisburg, Germany. At those 2024 Summer Olympics, she finished 5th in the women's K-2 500 metres and 7th in the Women's K-1 500 metres.
