= Mariia Kichasova-Skoryk =

Ukrainian canoeist (born 1993)

Personal information
- Nationality: Ukrainian
- Born: Марія Кічасова; 20 July 1993 (age 32) Poltava, Ukraine

Sport
- Country: Ukraine
- Sport: Canoe sprint
- Event: Kayaking
Medal record
Representing Ukraine
World Championships
Bronze medal – third place	2018 Montemor-o-Velho	K-2 200 m
European Championships
Gold medal – first place	2017 Plovdiv	K-2 200m
Silver medal – second place	2015 Račice	K-4 500m
Bronze medal – third place	2017 Plovdiv	K-4 500m

Mariia Oleksandrivna Kichasova-Skoryk, née Kichasova (Ukrainian: Марія Олександрівна Кічасова-Скорик; born 20 July 1993) is a Ukrainian canoeist.

== Career ==
She won medals at the European Championships. At the 2017 European championships in Plovdiv, Bulgaria, she became in pair with Anastasiya Horlova European champion in K-2 200m.

She qualified in the women's K-1 200 metres, and women's K-4 500 metres events at the 2020 Summer Olympics.
