= Ida Villumsen =

Danish canoeist

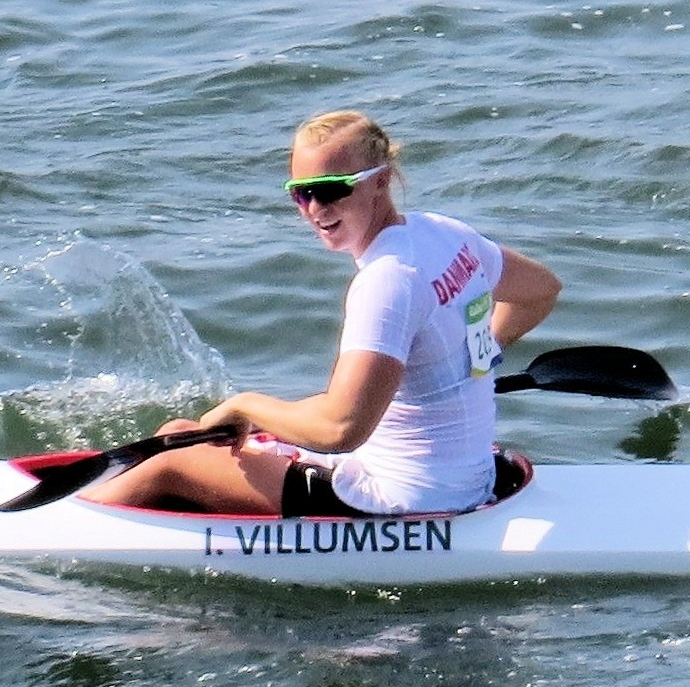
- Villumsen at the 2016 Olympics

Personal information
- Born: 30 November 1994 (age 31)
- Height: 176 cm (5 ft 9 in)
- Weight: 70 kg (154 lb)

Sport
- Sport: Canoe sprint
- Club: 361 Kano- og Kajakklub
- Coached by: Zoltán Bakó

Ida Villumsen (born 30 November 1994) is a Danish canoeist. She competed in the K-2 500 m and K-4 500 m events at the 2016 Summer Olympics and finished 12th and 6th, respectively.
