= Jo Brigden-Jones =

Australian canoeist (born 1988)

Personal information
- Nicknames: Goanna, Brigga, Joey, Jo Toe, JBJ, Bridget Jones
- Nationality: Australian
- Born: 19 April 1988 (age 38) Mona Vale, New South Wales
- Height: 182 cm (72 in) (2012)
- Weight: 74 kg (163 lb) (2012)

Sport
- Country: Australia
- Sport: Sprint Kayaking
- Event: K-4 500 m
- Club: Sydney Northern Beaches Kayak Club

Achievements and titles
- Olympic finals: Tokyo 2020 London 2012
Medal record
Women's
Representing Australia
World Championships
Bronze medal – third place	Szeged, Hungary	K2 200m

Jo Brigden-Jones (born 19 April 1988) is an Australian kayaker. She represented Australia at the 2012 Summer Olympics in London and the 2020 Olympic Games in Tokyo in sprint kayaking.

== Personal ==
Nicknamed Goanna, Brigga, JBJ, Joey and Jo Toe, Brigden-Jones was born on 19 April 1988 in Mona Vale, New South Wales. She attended Newport Public School before going to Oxford Falls Grammar School and Freshwater Senior Campus for high school. From 2006 to 2010, she attended the University of Technology, Sydney where she earned a Bachelor of Nursing. She earned a Graduate Diploma of Clinical Practice (Paramedic) from Charles Sturt University. In 2010, she injured her shoulder which required ten months out of competitive sport. In 2013, she again injured her shoulder, requiring another long period out of sport. She is a nurse and a paramedic. As of 2012, she lives in the Sydney suburb of Mona Vale.

Jo raced for Australia at the London 2012 Olympic Games in the K4 500m event. Her crew finished in 9th place. Jo is a World Championship medalist, having won a bronze medal in the K2 200m event at the 2011 World Championships in Szeged, Hungary.

Jo also competed at the postponed Tokyo 2020 Olympic Games, finishing 7th in the K4 500m and 13th in the K2 500m.

Jo gained worldwide recognition for her work as a paramedic during the COVID-19 pandemic. She appeared in TIME magazine alongside other Olympic and Paralympic athletes who battled the COVID-19 frontlines.

Brigden-Jones is a member of the Manly Surf Life Saving Club. She started surf lifesaving when she was six years old through an Australian programme called Nippers. In her mid-teens, she left the sport for a while but took it up again when she was nineteen. At that time, she added surfski paddling to her surf lifesaving competition events. She has competed for Manly in surf lifesaving competitions.

Brigden-Jones is 182 centimetres (72 in) tall and weighs 73 kilograms (161 lb).

== Kayaking ==
Brigden-Jones came into the kayaking in 2001 following a talent identification program. Jo made her first Australian Team at the age of 15. She raced in Europe as part of the Australian Junior Kayak Team and won her first international medal at the prestigious Bochum Regatta in Germany. She won a silver medal in the U16 K1 1000m.

Her primary training base is Narrabeen, Sydney with a secondary training base on the Gold Coast of Queensland. Her international training base is in Varese, Italy, the same location as the Australian Institute of Sport European Training Centre. She is a member of the Sydney Northern Beaches Kayak Club, and has a canoe scholarship with the Australian Institute of Sport and the NSW Institute of Sport.

In 2010, Brigden-Jones was ranked second in the world in the solo kayak paddler event. She finished third in the K2 200m event and fifth in the K4 500m event at the 2011 World Championships in Szeged, Hungary. She finished 7th in the K4 500m event at the 2011 World Cup 3 in Duisburg, Germany. She finished fifth in the K4 500m event at the 2011 World Cup 2 in Racice, Czech Republic. She finished first in the K4 500m event at the 2012 Oceania Championships in Penrith, Australia. She finished first in the K4 500m event at the 2012 National Championships in Penrith, Australia. At a 2012 World Cup event in Moscow in the two person kayak, she finished first.

Brigden-Jones was selected to represent Australia at 2012 Summer Olympics in the K-4 500 m event. The London Games will be her Olympic debut. Before the start of the Games, she and her canoe teammates trained in Italy at the AIS European Training Centre located in Varese. Jo and her teammates finish 9th at the London 2012 Olympic Games.

In 2016, Jo controversially missed selection for the 2016 Rio Olympic Games. In the domestic selection trails, Brigden-Jones had 3 wins in K1 races and 3 second places in K1 and K2 races. She was then forced into a race off with teammate Naomi Flood at the World Cup in Duisburg. But both athletes were racing in different events but their results were compared. Jo was only allowed to race the K1 200m event, and was not allowed to contest her preferred distance, the 500m. As a result of the World Cup race, Jo was not selected for the 2016 Rio Olympic Team.

Following the 2016 World Cup, Jo commenced work as a paramedic with NSW Ambulance. Jo had planned to hang up her paddle and retire from kayaking. Jo was drawn back to paddling, as she loves the sport and has great friends who were still training and racing. Jo decided to go along to training to keep fit and for the coffee catch ups after training. It was her competitive nature that kicked in and she decided to keep racing. Incredibly at the 2017 National Championships, Jo won the K1 200m. Even Jo was baffled, but delighted. Jo hadn't been able to train as much as she used to given her full-time shift work hours. Jo continued to pursue full-time work and training and went on to race internationally bringing home two silver medals at the World Cups and a place in the K1 500m A final at the World Championships.

In 2018, The Australian women's K4 500 (Alyce Burnett (QLD), Alyssa Bull (NSW) and Jaime Roberts (WA), Jo Brigden-Jones (NSW)), canoe sprint team shocked even themselves with a stunning silver medal at the ICF World Cup in Szeged, Hungary. The Australian crew, which only came together two months ago, chased the highly rated New Zealand team to the line, and in the process set the fastest ever time for a women's K4 500 crew. The crew went on to place 7th at the 2018 World Championships in Portugal.

In 2019, Jo and her K4 teammates qualified Australia a K4 500m quota position for Australia to race at the Tokyo Olympic Games, when they finished 7th at the 2019 World Championships in Szeged, Hungary. Jo is currently in training to qualify herself onto the Australian Olympic Team for 2020.

Jo has been named on Australian Kayak Teams every year since 2004. This includes Australian Junior Team, Australian Youth Olympic Festival, Under 23 Team, Senior Team and Olympic Team. Jo holds 38 Australian National Titles over various boat categories and distances.

== Career ==
After finishing high school in 2005, Jo began studying a Bachelor of Nursing at the University of Technology, Sydney. Jo was supported by UTS through the Elite Athlete Program during her years studying at UTS. She worked as a Registered Nurse on a casual basis from 2012 to 2015. In 2012, she started studying a Post Graduate course in Paramedics through Charles Sturt University. She managed her study alongside her training and her work as a RN. Jo commenced work in her dream career as a Paramedic in 2016. Jo had wanted to become a paramedic since she was 10 years old. Jo currently works full-time as a Paramedic for NSW Ambulance.

== Awards, Honours and roles ==
Honours

Post nominal initials - OLY, Olympian

Manly Pathway of Olympians - plaque placed in 2013 for Olympian status

Australia Day Ambassador 2016, 2017, 2018 & 2019

Awards

Australia Day Award 2018

NSW Institute of Sport - Personal Excellence Award

Charles Sturt University Distance Education Sports Person of the Year 2012 & 2014

Sport Achievement Award - Australian Institute of Sport 2011

Paddle NSW Female Paddler of the Year 2011

Pittwater Council - Sportsperson of the Year 2010

University of Technology, Sydney, Sportswoman of the Year 2008 & 2009

University of Technology, Sydney, Full Blue award 2008 & 2009

Layne Beachley 'Aim For the Stars Foundation' scholarship

Roles

NSW Institute of Sport, Athlete Advisory group member

Australian Institute of Sport and Lifeline Community Custodian

Australian Olympic Committee - Olympians Unleashed program

NSW Premier Sporting Challenge Ambassador
