= List of ICF Canoe Marathon World Championships medalists in women's kayak =

This is a list of medalists from the ICF Canoe Marathon World Championships in women's kayak.

== K-1 ==
Debuted: 1988.

Championships	Gold	Silver	Bronze
1988 Nottingham	Jane Hall (AUS)	Anna Polgár (HUN)	Beata Lewicka (POL)
1990 Copenhagen	Ingeborg Rasmussen (NOR)	Katalin Lakatos (HUN)	Manuela Koblitz (GDR)
1992 Brisbane	Susanne Gunnarsson (SWE)	Ursula Profanter (AUT)	Jane Hall (AUS)
1994 Amsterdam	Susanne Gunnarsson (SWE)	Denise Cooper (AUS)	Andrea Pitz (HUN)
1996 Vaxholm	Susanne Gunnarsson (SWE)	Anna Hemmings (GBR)	Nicole Bulk (NED)
1998 Cape Town	Susanne Gunnarsson (SWE)	Anna Hemmings (GBR)	Katalin Szonda (HUN)
1999 Győr	Anna Hemmings (GBR)	Kornélia Szonda (HUN)	Elisabetta Introini (ITA)
2000 Dartmouth	Mara Santos (ESP)	Kornélia Szonda (HUN)	Chantal Meek (AUS)
2001 Stockton-on-Tee	Anna Hemmings (GBR)	Elisabetta Introini (ITA)	Mara Santos (ESP)
2002 Zamora	Elisabetta Introini (ITA)	Mara Santos (ESP)	Marianne Fjeldheim (NOR)
2003 Valladolid	Renáta Csay (HUN)	Mara Santos (ESP)	Jenny Spencer (GBR)
2004 Bergen	Elisabetta Introini (ITA)	Beatriz Gomes (POR)	Barbara Przybylska (POL)
2005 Perth	Anna Hemmings (GBR)	Vivien Folláth (HUN)	Barbara Przybylska (POL)
2006 Tremolat	Anna Hemmings (GBR)	Renáta Csay (HUN)	Beatriz Gomes (POR)
2007 Győr	Anna Hemmings (GBR)	Renáta Csay (HUN)	Mara Santos (ESP)
2008 Týn nad Vltavou	Vivien Folláth (HUN)	Lani Belcher (AUS)	Anna Adamová (CZE)
2009 Gaia	Beatriz Gomes (POR)	Renáta Csay (HUN)	Lani Belcher (GBR)
2010 Banyoles	Renáta Csay (HUN)	Anna Adamová (CZE)	Frederike Leue (GER)
2011 Singapore	Renáta Csay (HUN)	Anna Alberti (ITA)	Anna Adamová (CZE)
2012 Rome	Renáta Csay (HUN)	Stefania Cicali (ITA)	Berenike Faldum (BUL)
2013 Copenhagen	Renáta Csay (HUN)	Anna Kožíšková (CZE)	Stefania Cicali (ITA)
2014 Oklahoma City	Renáta Csay (HUN)	Lizzie Broughton (GBR)	Anna Kožíšková (CZE)
2015 Győr	Anna Kožíšková (CZE)	Renáta Csay (HUN)	Kristina Bedeč (SRB)
2016 Brandenburg an der Havel	Renáta Csay (HUN)	Vanda Kiszli (HUN)	Kristina Bedeč (SRB)
2017 Pietermaritzburg	Lani Belcher (GBR)	Vanda Kiszli (HUN)	Jennifer Egan (IRL)
2018 Vila Verde	Vanda Kiszli (HUN)	Sára Mihalik (HUN)	Eva Barrios (ESP)
2019 Shaoxing	Vanda Kiszli (HUN)	Zsófia Czéllai-Vörös (HUN)	Lizzie Broughton (GBR)
2021 Pitești	Vanda Kiszli (HUN)	Zsófia Czéllai-Vörös (HUN)	Lizzie Broughton (GBR)
2022 Ponte de Lima	Vanda Kiszli (HUN)	Melina Andersson (SWE)	Samantha Rees-Clark (GBR)
2023 Vejen	Vanda Kiszli (HUN)	Melina Andersson (SWE)	Christie Mackenzie (RSA)
2024 Metković	Melina Andersson (SWE)	Vanda Kiszli (HUN)	Emese Kőhalmi (HUN)
2025 Győr	Melina Andersson (SWE)	Vanda Kiszli (HUN)	Anna Margrete Sletsjøe (NOR)

== K-1 short race ==
Debuted: 2019.

Championships	Gold	Silver	Bronze
2019 Shaoxing	Vanda Kiszli (HUN)	Kristina Bedeč (SRB)	Eva Barrios (ESP)
2021 Pitești	Vanda Kiszli (HUN)	Lizzie Broughton (GBR)	Kristina Bedeč (SRB)
2022 Ponte de Lima	Melina Andersson (SWE)	Estefanía Fernández (ESP)	Samantha Rees-Clark (GBR)
2023 Vejen	Melina Andersson (SWE)	Vanda Kiszli (HUN)	Eva Barrios (ESP)
2024 Metković	Melina Andersson (SWE)	Emese Kőhalmi (HUN)	Vanda Kiszli (HUN)
2025 Győr	Zsóka Csikós (HUN)	Melina Andersson (SWE)	Vanda Kiszli (HUN)

== K-2 ==
Debuted: 1988.

Championships	Gold	Silver	Bronze
1988 Nottingham	Gayle Mayes; Denise Cooper; Australia	Katalin Lakatos; Erika Janosi; Hungary	Mirosława Świtalska; Renata Oleś; Poland
1990 Copenhagen	Ágnes Erdődi; Andrea Baranyai; Hungary	Barbora Venerová; Alena Hroudová; Czech Republic	Ágnes Tas; Tünde Demény; Hungary
1992 Brisbane	Anett Schuck; Antje Manfroni; Germany	Sandra Troop; Maria Blumenthal; United Kingdom	Hanne Selmer; Bettina Larsen; Denmark
1994 Amsterdam	Denise Cooper; Shelley Jesney; Australia	Hanne Selmer; Bettina Larsen; Denmark	Andrea Biro; Ágnes Erdődi; Hungary
1996 Vaxholm	Susanne Rosenqvist; Maria Haglund; Sweden	Anett Schuck; Ramona Portwich; Germany	Andrea Biro; Ágnes Erdődi; Hungary
1998 Cape Town	Åsa Eklund; Susanne Rosenqvist; Sweden	Anett Schuck; Sabine Meyer; Germany	Andrea Delevay; Helen Gilby; United Kingdom
1999 Győr	Andrea Pitz; Renáta Csay; Hungary	Barbara Przybylska; Marzena Michalak; Poland	Susanne Rosenqvist; Lisen Augustsson; Sweden
2000 Dartmouth	Andrea Pitz; Renáta Csay; Hungary	Kornelia Szonda; Edit Jávorszky; Hungary	Mette Barfood; Jeanette Knudsen; Denmark
2001 Stockton-on-Tee	Anna Hemmings; Helen Gilby; United Kingdom	Renáta Csay; Kornelia Szonda; Hungary	Barbara Przybylska; Magdalena Sendal; Poland
2002 Zamora	Renáta Csay; Kornelia Szonda; Hungary	Anett Schuck; Wiebke Pontzen; Germany	Barbara Przybylska; Marzana Michalak; Poland
2003 Valladolid	Renáta Csay; Kornelia Szonda; Hungary|	Anett Schuck; Wiebke Pontzen; Germany	Barbara Przybylska; Marzana Michalak; Poland
2004 Bergen	Berenike Faldum; Linda Benedek; Hungary	Mette Barfod; Anne Lolk; Denmark	Amaia Osaba; Naiara Gomez; Spain
2005 Perth	Renáta Csay; Kornelia Szonda; Hungary	Dania Kamstra; Alexa Lombard; South Africa	Mette Barfod; Anne Lolk; Denmark
2006 Tremolat	Mette Barfod; Anne Lolk; Denmark	Renáta Csay; Vivien Folláth; Hungary	Berenike Faldum; Ágnes Szabó; Hungary
2007 Győr	Mette Barfod; Anne Lolk; Denmark	Renáta Csay; Vivien Folláth; Hungary	Berenike Faldum; Ágnes Szabó; Hungary
2008 Týn nad Vltavou	Henriette Engel Hansen; Anne Lolk; Denmark	Renáta Csay; Berenike Faldum; Hungary	Judit Kollár; Vivien Folláth; Hungary
2009 Gaia	Henriette Engel Hansen; Anne Lolk; Denmark	Renáta Csay; Berenike Faldum; Hungary	Beatriz Gomes; Joana Sousa; Portugal
2010 Banyoles	Renáta Csay; Berenike Faldum; Hungary	Jeanette Loevborg; Birgit Pontoppidan; Denmark	Lisa Sheriff; Agnes Brun-Lie; Norway
2011 Singapore	Renáta Csay; Ramona Farkasdi; Hungary	Krisztina Bedőcs; Alexandra Bara; Hungary	María Pérez; Naiara Gómez; Spain
2012 Rome	Renáta Csay; Ramona Farkasdi; Hungary	Stefania Cicali; Anna Alberti; Italy	Réka Hagymási; Vanda Kiszli; Hungary
2013 Copenhagen	Henriette Engel Hansen; Jeanette Loevborg; Denmark	Renáta Csay; Alexandra Bara; Hungary	Anna Kožíšková; Lenka Hrochová; Czech Republic
2014 Oklahoma City	Renáta Csay; Alexandra Bara; Hungary	Anna Kožíšková; Lenka Hrochová; Czech Republic	Amy Ward; Samantha Rees-Clark; United Kingdom
2015 Győr	Renáta Csay; Alexandra Bara; Hungary	Anna Kožíšková; Lenka Hrochová; Czech Republic	Anna Alberti; Stefania Cicali; Italy
2016 Brandenburg an der Havel	Renáta Csay; Alexandra Bara; Hungary	Kyeta Purchase; Jenna Ward; South Africa	Zsófia Giczy; Sára Anna Mihalik; Hungary
2017 Pietermaritzburg	Vanda Kiszli; Sára Anna Mihalik; Hungary	Renáta Csay; Alexandra Bara; Hungary	Lani Belcher; Hayleigh-Jayne Mason; United Kingdom
2018 Vila Verde	Renáta Csay; Zsófia Czéllai-Vörös; Hungary	Eva Barrios; Amaia Osaba; Spain	Tania Fernández; Tania Álvarez; Spain
2019 Shaoxing	Zsófia Czéllai-Vörös; Renáta Csay; Hungary	Tania Fernández; Tania Álvarez; Spain	Irati Osa; Arantza Toledo; Spain
2021 Pitești	Emese Kőhalmi; Eszter Rendessy; Hungary	Tania Fernández; Tania Álvarez; Spain	Jenna Ward; Saskia Hockly; South Africa
2022 Ponte de Lima	Tania Fernández; Tania Álvarez; Spain	Renáta Csay; Zsófia Czéllai-Vörös; Hungary	Melina Andersson; Johanna Johansson; Sweden
2023 Vejen	Vanda Kiszli; Emese Kőhalmi; Hungary	Tania Fernández; Tania Álvarez; Spain	Csilla Rugási; Panna Csépe; Hungary
2024 Metković	Zsóka Csikós; Emese Kőhalmi; Hungary	Saskia Hockly; Christie MacKenzie; South Africa	Melina Andersson; Ella Richter; Sweden
2025 Győr	Tania Fernández; Tania Álvarez; Spain	Zsófia Szerafin; Vanda Kiszli; Hungary	Panna Sinkó; Panna Csépe; Hungary
