= List of ICF Canoe Marathon World Championships medalists in women's canoe =

This is a list of medalists from the ICF Canoe Marathon World Championships in women's canoe.

== C-1 ==
Debuted: 2015.

Championships	Gold	Silver	Bronze
2015 Győr	Zsanett Lakatos (HUN)	Kincső Takács (HUN)	Marine Sansinena (FRA)
2016 Brandenburg an der Havel	Zsanett Lakatos (HUN)	Julie Cailleretz (FRA)	Liudmyla Babak (UKR)
2017 Pietermaritzburg	Liudmyla Babak (UKR)	Zsanett Lakatos (HUN)	Jana Ježová (CZE)
2018 Vila Verde	Liudmyla Babak (UKR)	Zsófia Kisbán (HUN)	Marine Sansinena (FRA)
2019 Shaoxing	Liudmyla Babak (UKR)	Xin Caiyun (CHN)	Zsófia Kisbán (HUN)
2021 Pitești	Liudmyla Babak (UKR)	Volha Klimava (BLR)	Zsófia Kisbán (HUN)
2022 Ponte de Lima	Liudmyla Babak (UKR)	Volha Klimava (BLR)	Zsófia Kisbán (HUN)
2023 Vejen	Liudmyla Babak (UKR)	Olena Tsyhankova (UKR)	Paulina Grzelkiewicz (POL)
2024 Metković	Liudmyla Babak (UKR)	Zsófia Kisbán (HUN)	Olena Tsyhankova (UKR)
2025 Győr	Giada Bragato (HUN)	Daniela Cociu (MDA)	Liudmyla Babak (UKR)

== C-1 short race ==
Debuted: 2019.

Championships	Gold	Silver	Bronze
2019 Shaoxing	Liudmyla Babak (UKR)	Zsófia Kisbán (HUN)	Wang Ying (CHN)
2021 Pitești	Liudmyla Babak (UKR)	Zsófia Kisbán (HUN)	Volha Klimava (BLR)
2022 Ponte de Lima	Bethany Gill (GBR)	Zsófia Kisbán (HUN)	Beatriz Fernandes (POR)
2023 Vejen	Zsófia Kisbán (HUN)	Liudmyla Babak (UKR)	Olena Tsyhankova (UKR)
2024 Metković	Zsófia Kisbán (HUN)	Liudmyla Babak (UKR)	Olena Tsyhankova (UKR)
2025 Győr	Zsófia Csorba (HUN)	Zsófia Kisbán (HUN)	Liudmyla Babak (UKR)
