= 2023 ICF Canoe Sprint World Championships – Women's K-1 5000 metres =

Women's K-1 5000 metres at the 2023 ICF Canoe Sprint World Championships
- Venue: Sportpark Duisburg
- Location: Duisburg, Germany
- Dates: 27 August
- Competitors: 26 from 26 nations
- Winning time: 22:45.357

Medalists
gold medal	Estefania Fernandez	Spain
silver medal	Madeline Schmidt	Canada
bronze medal	Melina Andersson	Sweden

The women's K-1 5000 metres competition at the 2023 ICF Canoe Sprint World Championships in Duisburg took place in Sportpark Duisburg.

== Schedule ==
The schedule is as follows:

Date	Time	Round
Sunday 27 August 2023	15:05	Final

== Results ==
As a long-distance event, it was held as a direct final.

Rank	Canoeist	Country	Time
1st place, gold medalist(s)	Estefania Fernandez	Spain	22:45.357
2nd place, silver medalist(s)	Madeline Schmidt	Canada	22:46.612
3rd place, bronze medalist(s)	Melina Andersson	Sweden	22:56.996
4	Anna Sletsjøe	Norway	23:06.268
5	Vanda Kiszli	Hungary	23:09.676
6	Jule Hake	Germany	23:18.381
7	Magdalena Garro	Argentina	23:52.985
8	Jennifer Egan-Simmons	Ireland	23:59.520
9	Anežka Paloudová	Czech Republic	24:00.732
10	Melissa Johnson	Great Britain	24:03.756
11	Kristina Bedeč	Serbia	24:10.044
12	Ana Roxana Lehaci	Austria	24:34.525
13	Danielle McKenzie	New Zealand	24:42.073
14	Inna Hryshchun	Ukraine	24:52.199
15	Pauline Freslon	France	25:23.251
16	Elizaveta Fedorova	Estonia	25:26.071
17	Maria Rei	Portugal	25:56.968
18	Darya Petrova	Kazakhstan	26:04.288
19	Katrina Smiltniece	Latvia	26:21.508
20	Mónica Hincapié	Colombia	26:33.460
21	Soniya Devi Phairembam	India	26:50.884
22	Liliana Cardenas	Ecuador	27:01.488
	Mehana Leafchild	United States	DSQ
	Yuriko Yamashita	Japan	DNF
	Aleksandra Mihalashvili	Bulgaria	DNF
	Agata Fantini	Italy	DNF
	Sara Mihalik	Finland	DNS
	Aya Ferfad	Algeria	DNS
	Darya Budouskaya	Israel	DNS
	Yocelin Canache	Venezuela	DNS
