= Mateusz Zuchora =

Polish canoeist (born 1992)

Personal information
- Born: 10 August 1992 (age 33)

Sport
- Country: Poland
- Sport: Canoe marathon
- Event(s): C-1, C-1 short race, C-2
Medal record
Representing Poland
Men's canoe marathon
World Championships
Gold medal – first place	2024 Metković	C-2
Gold medal – first place	2025 Győr	C-1
Silver medal – second place	2019 Shaoxing	C-2
Silver medal – second place	2021 Pitești	C-2
Silver medal – second place	2023 Vejen	C-1 short race
Bronze medal – third place	2022 Ponte de Lima	C-2
Bronze medal – third place	2023 Vejen	C-2
Bronze medal – third place	2025 Győr	C-2
European Championships
Gold medal – first place	2019 Decize	C-2
Gold medal – first place	2023 Slavonski Brod	C-2
Gold medal – first place	2024 Poznań	C-2
Silver medal – second place	2018 Metković	C-2
Silver medal – second place	2022 Silkeborg	C-2
Silver medal – second place	2023 Slavonski Brod	C-1 short race
Silver medal – second place	2025 Ponte de Lima	C-1 short race
Bronze medal – third place	2014 Piešťany	C-2
Bronze medal – third place	2021 Moscow	C-2

Mateusz Zuchora (born 10 August 1992) is a Polish marathon canoeist.

== Career ==
In September 2024, Zuchora competed at the 2024 ICF Canoe Marathon World Championships and won a gold medal in the C-2 event, along with Mateusz Borgiel, with a time of 1:53:01.90, winning his first World Championships gold medal.

In June 2025, he competed at the 2025 Canoe Marathon European Championships and won a silver medal in the C-1 short race with a time of 15:27.18. In August 2025, he competed at the 2025 ICF Canoe Marathon World Championships and won a gold medal in the C-1 event with a time of 1:43:20.20.
