= Tania Álvarez =

Spanish canoeist (born 1994)

Personal information
- Born: 4 October 1994 (age 31)

Sport
- Country: Spain
- Sport: Canoe marathon
- Event: K-1, K-2
Medal record
Representing Spain
Women's canoe marathon
World Championships
Gold medal – first place	2022 Ponte de Lima	K-2
Gold medal – first place	2025 Győr	K-2
Silver medal – second place	2019 Shaoxing	K-2
Silver medal – second place	2021 Pitești	K-2
Silver medal – second place	2023 Vejen	K-2
Bronze medal – third place	2018 Vila Verde	K-2
European Championships
Silver medal – second place	2019 Decize	K-2
Silver medal – second place	2024 Poznań	K-1
Bronze medal – third place	2023 Slavonski Brod	K-2

Tania Alvarez (born 4 October 1994) is a Spanish marathon canoeist.

== Career ==
Fernández competed at the 2022 ICF Canoe Marathon World Championships and won a gold medal in the K-2 event with a time of 1:58:09.56, along with Tania Fernández. She competed at the 2023 ICF Canoe Marathon World Championships and won a silver medal in the K-2 event with a time 1:53:32.00, finishing 0.43 seconds behind the gold medal-winning Hungarians. In September 2025, she competed at the 2025 ICF Canoe Marathon World Championships and won a gold medal in the K-2 event with a time of 1:51:26.22.
