= 2021 ICF Canoe Marathon World Championships =

International canoe competition

- Location: Pitești, Romania
- Dates: 30 September to 3 October 2021

The 2021 ICF Canoe Marathon World Championships was held from 30 September to 3 October 2021 in Pitești, Romania.

== Medalists ==
Event	Gold		Silver		Bronze	
Men's C-1	Balázs Adolf; Hungary	2:02:58.08	Márton Kövér; Hungary	2:03:07.70	Denys Davydov; Ukraine	2:06:05.98
Men's C-2	Manuel Campos; Diego Romero; Spain	1:56:34.95	Mateusz Borgiel; Mateusz Zuchora; Poland	1:56:44.68	Márton Kövér; Márton Horváth; Hungary	1:57:11.80
Men's K-1	Mads Pedersen; Denmark	2:03:38.96	Iván Alonso; Spain	2:04:03.61	Stephane Boulanger; France	2:05:29.31
Men's K-2	Quentin Urban; Jérémy Candy; France	1:59:03.21	Adrián Boros; Tamás Erdélyi; Hungary	1:59:04.30	Cyrille Carré; Stephane Boulanger; France	1:59:04.85
Women's C-1	Liudmyla Babak; Ukraine	1:21:01.53	Volha Klimava; Belarus	1:22:40.47	Zsófia Kisbán; Hungary	1:22:56.90
Women's K-1	Vanda Kiszli; Hungary	2:05:14.38	Zsófia Czéllai-Vörös; Hungary	2:05.17.44	Lizzie Broughton; Great Britain	2:05.18.09
Women's K-2	Emese Kohalmi; Eszter Rendessy; Hungary	1:55:07.23	Tania Fernández; Tania Álvarez; Spain	1:55:12.29	Jenna Ward; Saskia Hockly; South Africa	1:55.21.68

== Short Race Medalists ==
Event	Gold		Silver		Bronze	
Men's C-1	Balázs Adolf; Hungary	16:04.23	Mateusz Borgieł; Poland	16:08.41	Jakub Březina; Czech Republic	16:12.45
Men's K-1	José Ramalho; Portugal	14:19.85	Mads Pedersen; Denmark	14:23.13	Iván Alonso; Spain	14:28.59
Women's C-1	Liudmyla Babak; Ukraine	18:32.93	Zsófia Kisbán; Hungary	18:46.71	Volha Klimava; Belarus	19:11.79
Women's K-1	Vanda Kiszli; Hungary	16:11.11	Lizzie Broughton; Great Britain	16:14.95	Kristina Bedeč; Serbia	16:16.37

== Under-23 Medalists ==
Event	Gold		Silver		Bronze	
Men's C-1	Daniel Laczo; Hungary	1:47:40.08	Jaime Duro; Spain	1:48:10.78	Sérgio Maciel; Portugal	1:49:54.23
Men's K-1	Nikolai Thomsen; Denmark	1:50:52.94	Agustin Rodríguez; Argentina	1:52:26.15	Ulvard Hart; South Africa	1:52:49.17
Women's K-1	Cathrine Rask; Denmark	1:47:37.17	Dorina Fekete; Hungary	1:47:45.96	Christie Mackenzie; South Africa	1:48:22.24

== Junior Medalists ==
Event	Gold		Silver		Bronze	
Men's C-1	Péter Soltész; Hungary	1:35:20.97	Edoardo Pontecorvo; Italy	1:36:37.56	Daniel Grijalba; Spain	1:37:12.38
Men's C-2	Adrian Stepan; Victor Stepan; Romania	1:28:53.35	László Papp; Márk Csanki; Hungary	1:29:16.21	Daniel Grijalba; Juan Gómez; Spain	1:29:20.26
Men's K-1	Csanád Sellyei; Hungary	1:40:33.76	Bruno Kolozsvari; Hungary	1:40:45.48	Julian Salinas; Argentina	1:40:47.02
Men's K-2	Csanád Sellyei; Bruno Kolozsvari; Hungary	1:35:05.69	Nikolaj Bryde; Jeppe Maretti; Denmark	1:35:12.16	Baltazar Itria; Franco Marchetti; Argentina	1:35:19.28
Women's C-1	Alina Kovaleva; RCF	1:06:05.79	Lili Matkovics; Hungary	1:07:01.15	Katerina Bezniuk; Ukraine	1:07:11.87
Women's K-1	Maja Horváth; Hungary	1:32:30.92	Júlia Regenye; Hungary	1:32:42.28	Saskia Hockly; South Africa	1:32:59.13
Women's K-2	Sára Fojt; Laura Ujfalvi; Hungary	1:27:31.08	Evelin Csengeri; Maja Horváth; Hungary	1:27:36.65	Sophie Hansen; Karoline Nielsen; Denmark	1:28:52.58

== Medal table ==
* Host nation (Romania)

Rank	Nation	Gold	Silver	Bronze	Total
1	Hungary	11	10	2	23
2	Denmark	3	2	1	6
3	Ukraine	2	0	2	4
4	Spain	1	3	3	7
5	France	1	0	2	3
6	Portugal	1	0	1	2
7	RCF	1	0	0	1
7	Romania*	1	0	0	1
9	Poland	0	2	0	2
10	Argentina	0	1	2	3
11	Belarus	0	1	1	2
11	Great Britain	0	1	1	2
13	Italy	0	1	0	1
14	South Africa	0	0	4	4
15	Czech Republic	0	0	1	1
15	Serbia	0	0	1	1
Totals (16 entries)		21	21	21	63
