= Manuel Campos (canoeist) =

Spanish canoeist (born 1985)

Personal information
- Full name: Manuel Antonio Campos
- Born: 15 July 1985 (age 40)

Sport
- Country: Spain
- Sport: Canoe marathon
- Event(s): C-1, C-1 short race, C-2
Medal record
Representing Spain
Men's canoe marathon
Event	1st	2nd	3rd
World Championships	10	10	6
European Championships	10	3	5
Total	20	13	11
World Championships
Gold medal – first place	2012 Rome	C-1
Gold medal – first place	2014 Oklahoma City	C-1
Gold medal – first place	2018 Vila Verde	C-1
Gold medal – first place	2019 Shaoxing	C-1
Gold medal – first place	2019 Shaoxing	C-2
Gold medal – first place	2021 Pitești	C-2
Gold medal – first place	2022 Ponte de Lima	C-2
Gold medal – first place	2023 Vejen	C-1
Gold medal – first place	2023 Vejen	C-1 short race
Gold medal – first place	2023 Vejen	C-2
Silver medal – second place	2009 Vila Nova de Gaia	C-1
Silver medal – second place	2010 Banyoles	C-1
Silver medal – second place	2011 Singapore	C-1
Silver medal – second place	2013 Copenhagen	C-1
Silver medal – second place	2013 Copenhagen	C-2
Silver medal – second place	2014 Oklahoma City	C-2
Silver medal – second place	2015 Győr	C-1
Silver medal – second place	2016 Brandenburg an der Havel	C-1
Silver medal – second place	2019 Shaoxing	C-1 short race
Silver medal – second place	2024 Metković	C-1
Bronze medal – third place	2007 Győr	C-1
Bronze medal – third place	2012 Rome	C-2
Bronze medal – third place	2015 Győr	C-2
Bronze medal – third place	2017 Pietermaritzburg	C-1
Bronze medal – third place	2017 Pietermaritzburg	C-2
Bronze medal – third place	2022 Ponte de Lima	C-1
European Championships
Gold medal – first place	2013 Vila Verde	C-1
Gold medal – first place	2016 Pontevedra	C-1
Gold medal – first place	2016 Pontevedra	C-2
Gold medal – first place	2017 Ponte de Lima	C-2
Gold medal – first place	2018 Metković	C-1
Gold medal – first place	2019 Decize	C-1
Gold medal – first place	2022 Silkeborg	C-1
Gold medal – first place	2022 Silkeborg	C-2
Gold medal – first place	2024 Poznań	C-2
Gold medal – first place	2025 Ponte de Lima	C-1
Silver medal – second place	2017 Ponte de Lima	C-1
Silver medal – second place	2019 Decize	C-1 short race
Silver medal – second place	2023 Slavonski Brod	C-2
Bronze medal – third place	2019 Decize	C-2
Bronze medal – third place	2022 Silkeborg	C-1 short race
Bronze medal – third place	2023 Slavonski Brod	C-1
Bronze medal – third place	2024 Poznań	C-2
Bronze medal – third place	2025 Ponte de Lima	C-1
Men's canoe sprint
World Championships
Silver medal – second place	2015 Milan	C-1 5000 m
European Championships
Silver medal – second place	2012 Zagreb	C-1 5000 m

Manuel Antonio Campos (born 15 July 1985) is a Spanish marathon canoeist. He is a ten-time World Champion.

== Career ==
Campos is a ten-time Canoe Marathon World Champion, winning five C-1 championships, four C-2 championships, and one C-1 short race championship. He competed at the 2023 ICF Canoe Marathon World Championships and won gold medals in the C-1, C-1 short race, and C-2 events. He won four consecutive C-2 championships with Diego Romero from 2019 to 2023.
