= Zsófia Kisbán =

Hungarian canoeist

Personal information
- Nationality: Hungarian
- Born: 19 November 1997 (age 28)

Sport
- Country: Hungary
- Sport: Canoe sprint Canoe marathon
Medal record
Women's canoe sprint
World Championships
Silver medal – second place	2021 Copenhagen	C-1 5000 m
Silver medal – second place	2023 Duisburg	C-1 5000 m
European Championships
Bronze medal – third place	2024 Szeged	C-1 5000 m
Women's canoe marathon
World Championships
Gold medal – first place	2023 Vejen	C-1 short race
Gold medal – first place	2024 Metković	C-1 short race
Silver medal – second place	2018 Vila Verde	C-1
Silver medal – second place	2019 Shaoxing	C-1 short race
Silver medal – second place	2021 Pitesti	C-1 short race
Silver medal – second place	2022 Ponte de Lima	C-1 short race
Silver medal – second place	2022 Ponte de Lima	C-1
Silver medal – second place	2024 Metković	C-1
Silver medal – second place	2025 Győr	C-1 short race
Bronze medal – third place	2019 Shaoxing	C-1
Bronze medal – third place	2021 Pitesti	C-1
European Championships
Gold medal – first place	2021 Moscow	C-1
Gold medal – first place	2021 Moscow	C-1 short race
Bronze medal – third place	2026 Pitesti	C-1 short race
Bronze medal – third place	2026 Pitesti	C-2

Zsófia Kisbán (born 19 November 1997) is a Hungarian sprint canoeist.

She competed at the 2021 ICF Canoe Sprint World Championships, winning a silver medal in the C-1 5000 m distance.
