= Vanda Kiszli =

Hungarian canoeist (born 1993)

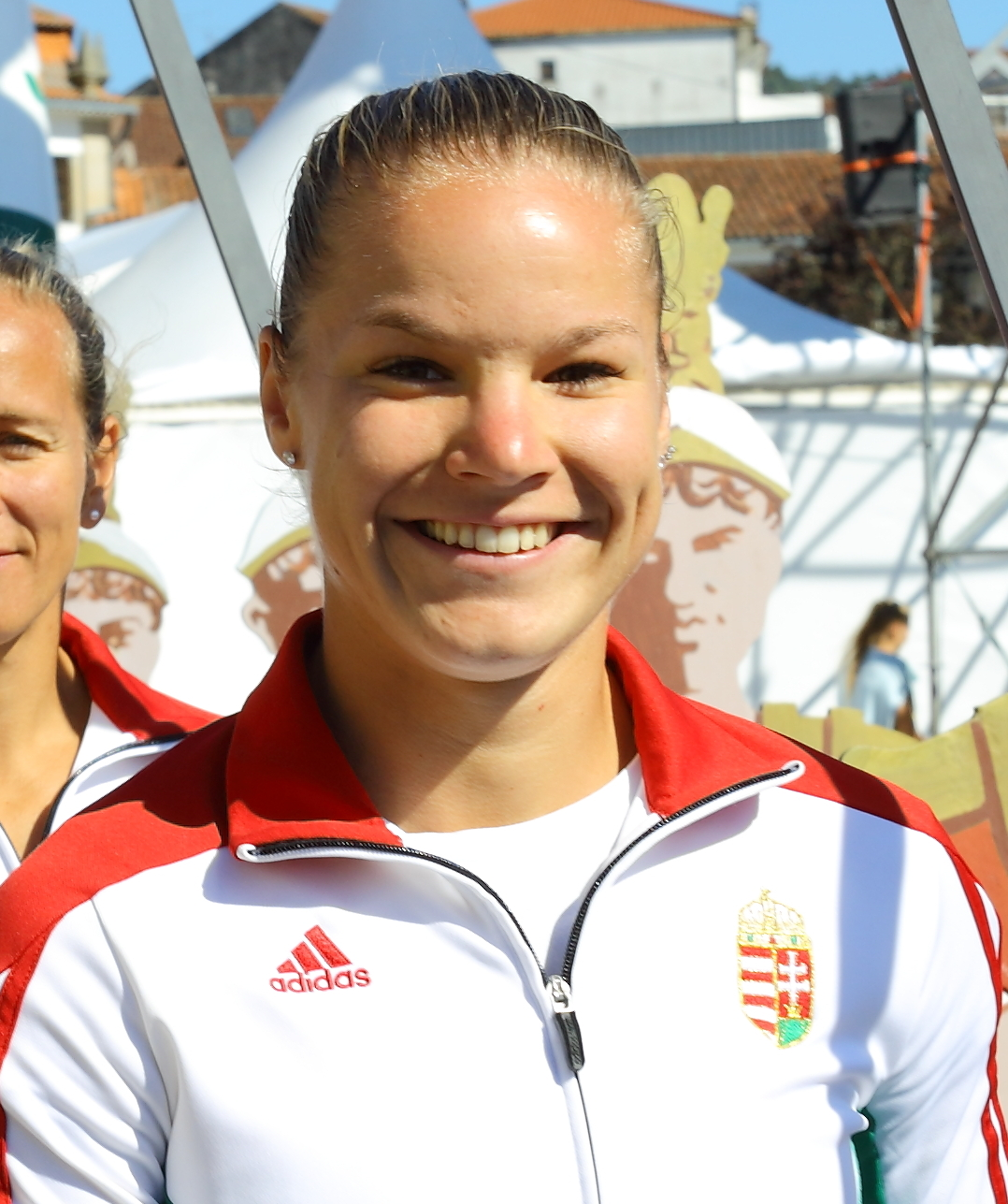
- Kiszli in 2017

Personal information
- Born: 27 December 1993 (age 32) Szekszárd, Hungary

Sport
- Country: Hungary
- Sport: Canoe marathon
Medal record
Representing Hungary
Women's canoe marathon
Event	1st	2nd	3rd
World Championships	9	6	3
European Championships	11	4	2
Total	20	10	5
World Championships
Gold medal – first place	2017 Pietermaritzburg	K-2
Gold medal – first place	2018 Vila Verde	K-1
Gold medal – first place	2019 Shaoxing	K-1
Gold medal – first place	2019 Shaoxing	K-1 short race
Gold medal – first place	2021 Pitești	K-1
Gold medal – first place	2021 Pitești	K-1 short race
Gold medal – first place	2022 Ponte de Lima	K-1
Gold medal – first place	2023 Vejen	K-1
Gold medal – first place	2023 Vejen	K-2
Silver medal – second place	2016 Brandenburg	K-1
Silver medal – second place	2017 Pietermaritzburg	K-1
Silver medal – second place	2023 Vejen	K-1 short race
Silver medal – second place	2024 Metković	K-1
Silver medal – second place	2025 Győr	K-1
Silver medal – second place	2025 Győr	K-2
Bronze medal – third place	2012 Rome	K-2
Bronze medal – third place	2024 Metković	K-1 short race
Bronze medal – third place	2025 Győr	K-1 short race
European Championships
Gold medal – first place	2018 Metković	K-2
Gold medal – first place	2019 Decize	K-1
Gold medal – first place	2021 Moscow	K-1
Gold medal – first place	2022 Silkeborg	K-1
Gold medal – first place	2022 Silkeborg	K-1 short race
Gold medal – first place	2023 Slavonski Brod	K-1
Gold medal – first place	2023 Slavonski Brod	K-1 short race
Gold medal – first place	2024 Poznań	K-1
Gold medal – first place	2024 Poznań	K-1 short race
Gold medal – first place	2025 Ponte de Lima	K-1 short race
Gold medal – first place	2025 Ponte de Lima	K-2
Silver medal – second place	2016 Pontevedra	K-1
Silver medal – second place	2021 Moscow	K-1 short race
Silver medal – second place	2024 Poznań	K-2
Silver medal – second place	2025 Ponte de Lima	K-1
Bronze medal – third place	2017 Ponte de Lima	K-1
Bronze medal – third place	2013 Vila Verde	K-2
World Games
Gold medal – first place	2022 Birmingham	K-1
Gold medal – first place	2022 Birmingham	K-1 short race
Silver medal – second place	2013 Cali	K-1
Silver medal – second place	2025 Chengdu	K-1 short race
Silver medal – second place	2025 Chengdu	K-1

Vanda Kiszli (born 27 December 1993) is a Hungarian marathon canoeist. She is a nine-time World Champion and eleven-time European Champion.

== Career ==
Kiszli won every ICF Canoe Marathon World Championships K-1 championship from 2018 until 2023. During the 2019 ICF Canoe Marathon World Championships, she won gold medals in both the K-1 long marathon and K-1 short race events. She repeated as a double champion at the 2021 ICF Canoe Marathon World Championships, winning gold medals in both the K-1 long marathon and K-1 short race events. During the 2023 ICF Canoe Marathon World Championships, she won gold medals in both the K-1 and K-2 events, and a silver medal in K-1 short race. During the 2024 ICF Canoe Marathon World Championships, Kiszli was defeated by Melina Andersson, ending her streak of five consecutive K-1 World Championship titles.

In July 2022, she competed at the 2022 World Games in canoe marathon and won gold medals in the K-1 and K-1 short race events. In August 2025, she competed at the 2025 World Games and won silver medals in the K-1 short race and K1 events. The next month she competed at the 2025 ICF Canoe Marathon World Championships and won a bronze medal in the K-1 short race with a time of 15:28.93.
