= 2023 Canoe Marathon European Championships =

- Location: Slavonski Brod, Croatia
- Dates: 13–16 July

The 2023 Canoe Marathon European Championships was held from 13 to 16 July 2023 in Slavonski Brod, Croatia.

== Medal table ==
* Host nation (Croatia)

Rank	Nation	Gold	Silver	Bronze	Total
1	Hungary (HUN)	8	6	5	19
2	Spain (ESP)	5	5	13	23
3	Poland (POL)	2	3	1	6
4	Denmark (DEN)	2	1	1	4
5	Ukraine (UKR)	2	1	0	3
6	Czech Republic (CZE)	2	0	0	2
7	Great Britain (GBR)	1	3	1	5
8	France (FRA)	1	0	1	2
8	Norway (NOR)	1	0	1	2
10	Portugal (POR)	0	3	1	4
11	Germany (GER)	0	1	0	1
11	Serbia (SRB)	0	1	0	1
Totals (12 entries)		24	24	24	72

== Medalists ==
=== Senior ===
Event	Gold		Silver		Bronze	
Men
K1 Short Race (3.40 km)	Eivind Vold (NOR)	13:25.95	José Ramalho (POR)	13:28.25	Mads Pedersen (DEN)	13:29.99
C1 Short Race (3.40 km)	Mateusz Borgieł (POL)	15:03.94	Mateusz Zuchora (POL)	15:08.89	Diego Romero (ESP)	15:14.78
K1 (29.80 km)	Mads Pedersen (DEN)	2:08:45.17	Iván Alonso (ESP)	2:09:38.42	Eivind Vold (NOR)	2:12:10.06
C1 (22.60 km)	Manuel Garrido (ESP)	1:48:18.80	Márton Kövér (HUN)	1:49:33.91	Manuel Campos (ESP)	1:49:51.32
K2 (29.80 km)	France; Quentin Urban; Jérémy Candy	1:31:41.58	Portugal; José Ramalho; Alfredo Faria	1:31:43.46	Hungary; Adrián Boros; Bruno Kolozsvári	1:31:49.14
C2 (22.60 km)	Poland; Mateusz Zuchora; Mateusz Borgiel	1:45:11.93	Spain; Manuel Campos; Diego Romero	1:45:26.27	Spain; Fernando Busto; Diego Miguéns	1:45:36.77
Women
K1 Short Race (3.40 km)	Vanda Kiszli (HUN)	14:54.37	Kristina Bedeč (SRB)	15:07.72	Eva Barrios (ESP)	15:08.05
C1 Short Race (3.40 km)	Liudmyla Babak (UKR)	17:20.84	Olena Tsyhankova (UKR)	17:40.51	María Martín (ESP)	18:41.34
K1 (26.20 km)	Vanda Kiszli (HUN)	2:04:00.31	Zsófia Vörös (HUN)	2:07:11.80	Eva Barrios (ESP)	2:07:33.46
C1 (15.40 km)	Liudmyla Babak (UKR)	1:22:49.60	Paulina Grzelkiewicz (POL)	1:26:28.84	Yseline Huet (FRA)	1:26:53.31
K2 (26.20 km)	Hungary; Evelin Csengeri; Panna Sinkó	1:43:06.41	Hungary; Csilla Rugási; Panna Csépe	1:43:10.13	Spain; Tania Fernández; Tania Alvarez	1:43:16.14

=== Under 23 ===
Event	Gold		Silver		Bronze	
Men
K1 (26.20 km)	Philip Knudsen (DEN)	1:54:57.55	Csanád Sellyei (HUN)	1:54:58.53	Joaquín Iglesias (ESP)	1:54:58.97
C1 (19.00 km)	Jaime Duro (ESP)	1:35:19.79	Eryk Wilga (POL)	1:36:02.26	Gonzalo Moreno (ESP)	1:37:10.65
Women
K1 (22.60 km)	Kateřina Mílová (CZE)	1:48:10.15	Pernille Hostrup (DEN)	1:48:20.79	Celia Toledo (ESP)	1:48:22.22
C1 (11.80 km)	Alžběta Veverková (CZE)	1:07:23.82	Annette Wehrmann (GER)	1:08:29.99	Anna Gorinsky (ESP)	1:11:11.71

=== Junior ===
Event	Gold		Silver		Bronze	
Men
K1 Short Race (3.40 km)	David Pazos (ESP)	14:06.19	Harry Freeland (GBR)	14:06.51	João Bento (POR)	14:15.59
C1 (15.40 km)	Darío Sánchez (ESP)	1:20:09.73	Mihály Pluzsik (HUN)	1:20:25.10	Krystian Kubica (POL)	1:20:44.26
K1 (22.60 km)	David Pazos (ESP)	1:40:10.57	João Sousa (POR)	1:40:20.19	Árpád Kékesi (HUN)	1:40:28.85
K2 (22.60 km)	Hungary; Árpád Kékesi; Dániel Zemen	1:36:53.67	Spain; Ruben Castilla; Arturo Aguilar	1:36:55.30	Spain; Diego Lago; Miguel Fernández	1:36:57.82
C2 (15.40 km)	Hungary; Milan Gyanyi; Zsombor Dózsa	1:14:23.33	Spain; Izan Velasco; Daniel Infantes	1:15:14.74	Spain; David Olivares; Ulises Colastra	1:15:35.13
Women
K1 Short Race (3.40 km)	Greta Roeser (GBR)	15:41.77	Klaudia Kmetyo (HUN)	15:52.89	Sienna Payne (GBR)	16:14.66
K1 (19.00 km)	Zsófia Szerafin (HUN)	1:32:35.73	Greta Roeser (GBR)	1:32:49.47	Janka Reisz (HUN)	1:34:02.69
C1 (11.80 km)	Imola Batka (HUN)	1:10:06.12	Nerea Novo (ESP)	1:11:28.19	Iringo Batka (HUN)	1:12:33.86
K2 (19.00 km)	Hungary; Janka Reisz; Klaudia Kmetyo	1:26:01.49	United Kingdom; Greta Roeser; Sienna Payne	1:27:28.55	Hungary; Lili Dékány; Hannah Szmrtyka	1:27:45.77
