= 1999 Canoe Marathon European Championships =

The 1999 Canoe Marathon European Championships were the third edition of the Canoe Marathon European Championships, which took place on 4–5 September 1999 in Gorzów, Poland. The competition was staged on the Warta river and was composed of six events – four in kayak (men's and women's K-1 and K-2) and two in canoe (men's C-1 and C-2) – all of which were contested in a distance of 38 kilometers. In parallel, four junior events were also contested in a distance of 22 kilometers.

== Medal overview ==
=== Medalists ===
Event	Gold	Time	Silver	Time	Bronze	Time
Men's C-1	Pál Pétervári (HUN)	2:44:04	Rus Radoslav (SVK)	2:45:17	Gabor Kolozsvari (HUN)	2:49:06
Men's C-2	Hungary (HUN); Edvin Csabai; Attila Giore	2:39:37	France (FRA); Hervé Maigrot; Lionel Dubois-Dunilac	2:42:31	Poland (POL); Marcin Grzybowski; Konrad Pypłacz	2:44:54
Men's K-1	István Salga (HUN)	2:18:14	Conor Holmes (GBR)	2:18:19	Dolph Te Linde (NED)	2:19:03
Men's K-2	Spain (ESP); Julio Martinez; Rafael Quevedo	2:18:01	Hungary (HUN); Viktor Szakaly; Attila Jambor	2:18:02	Spain (ESP); Jorge Alonso; Santiago Guerrero	2:18:03
Women's K-1	Anna Hemmings (GBR)	2:29:39	Mara Santos (ESP)	2:29:40	Kornelia Szonda (HUN)	2:32:26
Women's K-2	Hungary (HUN); Andrea Pitz; Renata Csay	2:31:57	Poland (POL); Marzena Michalak; Barbara Przybylska	2:32:20	Spain (ESP); Mara Santos; Pilar del Villar	2:34.27

=== Medal table ===
Rank	Nation	Gold	Silver	Bronze	Total
1	Hungary	4	1	2	7
2	Spain	1	1	2	4
3	Great Britain	1	1	0	2
4	Poland	0	1	1	2
5	France	0	1	0	1
5	Slovakia	0	1	0	1
7	Netherlands	0	0	1	1
Totals (7 entries)		6	6	6	18
