= 2019 ICF Canoe Marathon World Championships =

International canoe competition

- Location: Shaoxing, China
- Dates: 17 to 20 October 2019

The 2019 ICF Canoe Marathon World Championships took place between 17 and 20 October 2019 in Shaoxing, China. The competition consisted of twenty-one events – twelve in kayak and nine in canoe – shared between junior, under-23 and senior categories.

== Medalists ==
=== Seniors ===
Event	Gold	Time	Silver	Time	Bronze	Time
Men's C-1	Manuel Campos (ESP)	2:05:31.65	Jakub Březina (CZE)	2:05:42.04	Kirill Shamshurin (RUS)	2:05:50.13
Men's C-1 short race	Diego Romero (ESP)	16:17.54	Manuel Campos (ESP)	16:18.86	Jakub Březina (CZE)	16:24.15
Men's C-2	Spain (ESP); Manuel Campos; Diego Romero	1:59:06.33	Poland (POL); Mateusz Zuchora; Mateusz Borgiel	1:59:19.77	Hungary (HUN); Dániel Laczó; Gergely Nagy	2:00:33.31
Men's K-1	Mads Pedersen (DEN)	2:08:34.21	José Ramalho (POR)	2:08:35.53	Franco Balboa (ARG)}	2:08:36.51
Men's K-1 short race	Cyrille Carré (FRA)	14:20.20	Jérémy Candy (FRA)	14:21.51	Franco Balboa (ARG)	14:27.35
Men's K-2	France (FRA); Quentin Urban; Jérémy Candy	1:58:45.25	Hungary (HUN); Adrián Boros; Krisztián Máthé	1:58:49.19	Argentina (ARG); Franco Balboa; Dardo Balboa	1:58:55.97
Women's C-1	Liudmyla Babak (UKR)	1:19:30.84	Xin Caiyun (CHN)	1:21:03.84	Zsófia Kisbán (HUN)	1:21:56.98
Women's C-1 short race	Liudmyla Babak (UKR)	19:20.43	Zsófia Kisbán (HUN)	19:30.85	Wang Ying (CHN)	19:43.05
Women's K-1	Vanda Kiszli (HUN)	2:03:06.75	Zsófia Czéllai-Vörös (HUN)	2:03:13.76	Lizzie Broughton (GBR)	2:03:17.26
Women's K-1 short race	Vanda Kiszli (HUN)	15:40.29	Kristina Bedeč (SRB)	15:41.38	Eva Barrios (ESP)	15:45.44
Women's K-2	Hungary (HUN); Zsófia Czéllai-Vörös; Renáta Csay	1:56:30.22	Spain (ESP); Tania Fernández; Tania Álvarez	1:56:33.99	Spain (ESP); Irati Osa; Arantza Toledo	1:56:56.72

=== Under 23 ===
Event	Gold	Time	Silver	Time	Bronze	Time
Men's C-1	Denis Davydov (UKR)	1:51:16.00	Mateusz Borgiel (POL)	1:51:18.40	Dániel Laczó (HUN)	1:52:15.67
Men's K-1	Mads Pedersen (DEN)	1:51:49.56	Thorbjørn Rask (DEN)	1:52:26.46	Mate Gyorgjakab (HUN)	1:54:01.11
Women's K-1	Lili Katona (HUN)	1:49:53.66	Anna Sletsjøe (NOR)	1:51:15.13	Irati Osa (ESP)	1:51:30.55

=== Juniors ===
Event	Gold	Time	Silver	Time	Bronze	Time
Men's C-1	Benedek Horváth (HUN)	1:31:49.56	Kristóf Kollár (HUN)	1:32:29.00	Ji Bowen (CHN)	1:35:03.98
Men's K-1	Nikolai Thomsen (DEN)	1:39:01.45	Philip Knudsen (DEN)	1:39:07.04	Vince Petró (HUN)	1:39:16.88
Men's C-2	Hungary (HUN); Benedek Horváth; Olivér Nagy	1:26:50.28	China (CHN); Wang Zihang; Zhu Jiadong	1:27:16.69	Spain (ESP); Pablo Crespo; Diego Piñeiro	1:27:54.54
Men's K-2	Hungary (HUN); Zsombor Ory; Tamás Erdélyi	1:32:29.11	South Africa (RSA); David Evans; Hamish MacKenzie	1:32:30.97	Denmark (DEN); Philip Knudsen; Nikolai Thomsen	1:32:38.22
Women's C-1	Clémence Leblanc (FRA)	1:01:08.45	Csenge Molnár (HUN)	1:01:12.51	Zhang Die (CHN)	1:01:46.66
Women's K-1	Eszter Rendessy (HUN)	1:28:05.67	Zsóka Csikós (HUN)	1:28:26.80	Celia Toledo (ESP)	1:31:14.79
Women's K-2	Hungary (HUN); Emese Kőhalmi; Eszter Rendessy	1:21:52.03	Hungary (HUN); Eszter Csonka; Evelin Csengeri	1:23:27.22	Czech Republic (CZE); Adela Házová; Kateřina Zárubová	1:24:08.35

== Medal table ==
* Host nation (China)

Rank	Nation	Gold	Silver	Bronze	Total
1	Hungary	9	7	5	21
2	Spain	3	2	5	10
3	Denmark	3	2	1	6
4	France	3	1	0	4
5	Ukraine	3	0	0	3
6	China*	0	2	3	5
7	Poland	0	2	0	2
8	Czech Republic	0	1	2	3
9	Norway	0	1	0	1
9	Portugal	0	1	0	1
9	Serbia	0	1	0	1
9	South Africa	0	1	0	1
13	Argentina	0	0	3	3
14	Great Britain	0	0	1	1
14	Russia	0	0	1	1
Totals (15 entries)		21	21	21	63
