= Olena Tsyhankova =

Ukrainian canoeist (born 1999)

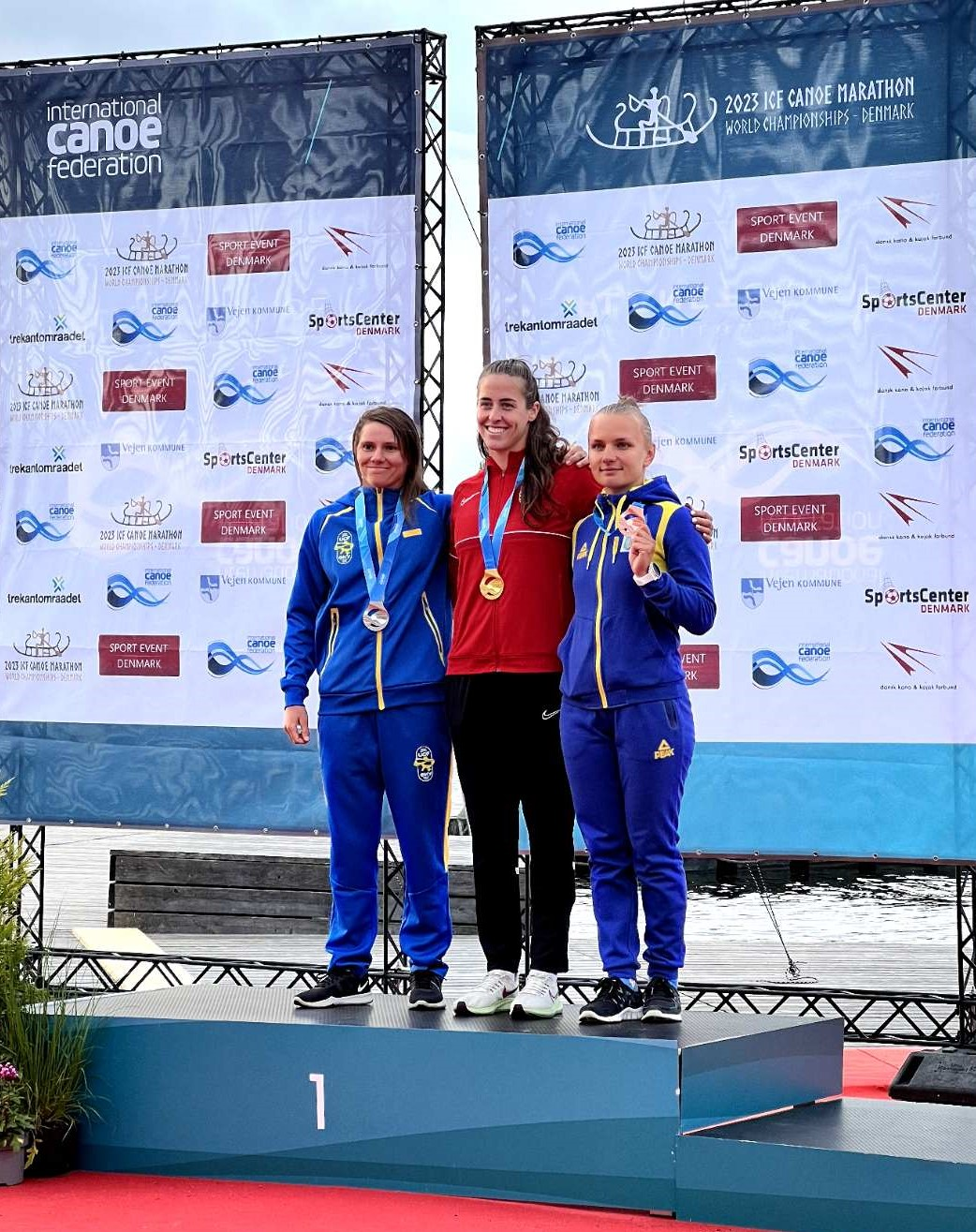
- Tsyhankova (right) at the 2023 Marathon WCh

Personal information
- Nationality: Ukrainian
- Born: 23 January 1999 (age 27) Mlyniv, Rivne Oblast, Ukraine

Sport
- Country: Ukraine
- Sport: Canoe sprint
Medal record
Women's canoe sprint
World Championships
| Bronze medal – third place | 2021 Copenhagen | C-4 500 m |
Women's canoe marathon
World Championships
| Silver medal – second place | 2023 Vejen | C-1 |
| Bronze medal – third place | 2023 Vejen | C-1 short race |
| Bronze medal – third place | 2024 Metković | C-1 short race |
| Bronze medal – third place | 2024 Metković | C-1 |
European Championships
| Gold medal – first place | 2025 Ponte de Lima | C-1 |
| Silver medal – second place | 2023 Brod | C-1 short race |
| Silver medal – second place | 2024 Poznań | C-1 short race |
| Bronze medal – third place | 2025 Ponte de Lima | C-1 short race |

Olena Tsyhankova (born 23 January 1999) is a Ukrainian sprint canoeist.

She competed at the 2021 ICF Canoe Sprint World Championships, winning a bronze medal in the C-4 500 m distance.
