= 1997 Canoe Marathon European Championships =

The 1997 Canoe Marathon European Championships were the second edition of the Canoe Marathon European Championships, which took place on 13–14 September 1997 in Pavia, Italy. The competition consisted of six events, four in kayak (men and women's K-1 and K-2) and two in canoe (men's C-1 and C-2), all of which were contested in a distance of 36 kilometers.

== Medal overview ==
=== Medalists ===
Event	Gold	Time	Silver	Time	Bronze	Time
Men's C-1	Pál Pétervári (HUN)	3:42:32	José Sousa (POR)	3:44:05	Gábor Kolozsvári (HUN)	3:47.30
Men's C-2	Hungary (HUN); Gábor Balgovics; Béla Jakus	2:38:10	Hungary (HUN); Edvin Csabai; Attila Giore	2:41:02	France (FRA); Hervé Maigrot; Lionel Dubois-Dunilac	2:42.41
Men's K-1	Edwin de Nijs (NED)	3:12:19	Tim Brabants (GBR)	3:12:56	Dolph Te Linde (NED)	3:15.07
Men's K-2	Sweden (SWE); Magnus Skoldbeck; Tim Krantz	3:10:33	Denmark (DEN); Thomas Christiansen; Karsten Solgård	3:10:49	Great Britain (GBR); Ivan Lawler; Steven Harris	3:12.08
Women's K-1	Anna Hemmings (GBR)	2:44:47	Kornélia Szonda (HUN)	2:44:49	Nicole Bulk (NED)	2:46.04
Women's K-2	Great Britain (GBR); Patricia Davey; Sonja Bapty	2:31:04	Hungary (HUN); Andrea Pitz; Renáta Csay	2:31:05	Poland (POL); Marzena Michalak; Izabella Dankowska	2:31.09

=== Medal table ===
Rank	Nation	Gold	Silver	Bronze	Total
1	Hungary	2	3	1	6
2	Great Britain	2	1	1	4
3	Netherlands	1	0	2	3
4	Sweden	1	0	0	1
5	Denmark	0	1	0	1
5	Portugal	0	1	0	1
7	France	0	0	1	1
7	Poland	0	0	1	1
Totals (8 entries)		6	6	6	18
