= Tania Fernández (canoeist) =

Spanish canoeist (born 1992)

Personal information
- Born: 10 January 1992 (age 34) Lugo, Spain

Sport
- Country: Spain
- Sport: Canoe marathon
- Event: K-2
Medal record
Representing Spain
Women's canoe marathon
World Championships
Gold medal – first place	2022 Ponte de Lima	K-2
Gold medal – first place	2025 Győr	K-2
Silver medal – second place	2019 Shaoxing	K-2
Silver medal – second place	2021 Pitești	K-2
Silver medal – second place	2023 Vejen	K-2
Bronze medal – third place	2018 Vila Verde	K-2
European Championships
Silver medal – second place	2019 Decize	K-2
Bronze medal – third place	2023 Slavonski Brod	K-2

Tania Fernández (born 10 January 1992) is a Spanish marathon canoeist.

== Career ==
Fernández competed at the 2022 ICF Canoe Marathon World Championships and won a gold medal in the K-2 event with a time of 1:58:09.56, along with Tania Álvarez. She competed at the 2023 ICF Canoe Marathon World Championships and won a silver medal in the K-2 event with a time 1:53:32.00, finishing 0.43 seconds behind the gold medal-winning Hungarians. In September 2025, she competed at the 2025 ICF Canoe Marathon World Championships and won a gold medal in the K-2 event with a time of 1:51:26.22.
