= 2022 Canoe Marathon European Championships =

- Location: Silkeborg, Denmark
- Dates: 28–31 July
- Competitors: 233 from 17 nations

The 2022 Canoe Marathon European Championships took place from 28 to 31 July 2022 in Silkeborg, Denmark.

== Schedule ==
All times are local time (Central European Summer Time).

Date	Time	Event
Thursday 28	8:45	K1 Women Juniors
Thursday 28	8:50	C1 Women Juniors
Thursday 28	11:45	K1 Men - Short Race Heat 1
Thursday 28	12:15	K1 Men - Short Race Heat 2
Thursday 28	14:35	C1 Men Juniors
Thursday 28	16:00	C1 Women - Short Race Final
Thursday 28	16:30	C1 Men - Short Race Final
Thursday 28	17:00	K1 Women - Short Race Final
Thursday 28	17:30	K1 Men - Short Race Final
Friday 29	8:45	K2 Women Juniors
Friday 29	8:55	C1 Men Under 23
Friday 29	14:15	K1 Women Under 23
Friday 29	14:20	C2 Men Juniors
Friday 29	16:15	K1 Men Under 23
Saturday 30	8:15	K1 Men Juniors
Saturday 30	8:20	C1 Women
Saturday 30	10:30	C1 Men
Saturday 30	13:15	K1 Men
Saturday 30	16:00	K1 Women
Sunday 31	8:45	K2 Men Juniors
Sunday 31	8:50	C2 Men
Sunday 31	12:00	K2 Men
Sunday 31	14:00	K2 Women

== Medalists ==
=== Senior ===
Event	Gold		Silver		Bronze	
Men
K1 Short Race (3,40 km)	Mads Pedersen (DEN)	14:37.05	Iván Alonso (ESP)	14:49.64	Walter Bouzán (ESP)	15:00.46
C1 Short Race (3,40 km)	Mateusz Borgieł (POL)	16:42.38	Mateusz Kamiński (POL)	16:49.69	Manuel Campos (ESP)	17:00.64
K1 (29,80 km)	Mads Pedersen (DEN)	2:05:23.28	Iván Alonso (ESP)	2:05:24.83	José Ramalho (POR)	2:08:58.27
C1 (26,20 km)	Manuel Campos (ESP)	2:08:55.94	Manuel Garrido (ESP)	2:09:03.49	Sérgio Maciel (POR)	2:09:30.75
K2 (29,80 km)	Spain; Miguel Llorens; Alberto Plaza	1:59:29.00	France; Quentin Urban; Jérémy Candy	1:59:30.42	Denmark; Søren Maretti; Nicolai Thomsen	1:59:33.50
C2 (26,20 km)	Spain; Manuel Campos; Diego Romero	1:59:24.82	Poland; Mateusz Zuchora; Mateusz Borgieł	1:59:35.76	Spain; Fernando Busto; Diego Miguéns	2:00:47.77
Women
K1 Short Race (3,40 km)	Vanda Kiszli (HUN)	16:46.47	Eva Barrios (ESP)	17:01.71	Samantha Rees-Clark (GBR)	17:02.59
C1 Short Race (3,40 km)	Liudmyla Babak (UKR)	19:27.45	Bethany Gill (GBR)	19:30.47	Marine Sansinena (FRA)	20:24.96
K1 (26,20 km)	Vanda Kiszli (HUN)	2:05:57.87	Samantha Rees-Clark (GBR)	2:06:11.91	Zsófia Czéllai (HUN)	2:06:16.19
C1 (15,40 km)	Liudmyla Babak (UKR)	1:28:41.66	Bethany Gill (GBR)	1:30:06.99	Paulina Grzelkiewicz (POL)	1:32:01.02
K2 (26,20 km)	Sweden; Melina Andersson; Johanna Johansson	1:59:40.76	Hungary; Renáta Csay; Zsófia Czéllai	1:59:42.50	Spain; Irati Osa; Arantza Toledo	1:59:43.83

=== Under 23 ===
Event	Gold		Silver		Bronze	
Men
K1 (26,20 km)	Nikolai Thomsen (DEN)	1:54:56.17	Charles Smith (GBR)	1:55:00.76	Joaquín Iglesias (ESP)	1:55:06.01
C1 (22,60 km)	Adrian Kłos (POL)	1:52:53.49	Máté Zsidai (HUN)	1:53:19.10	Diego Piñeiro (ESP)	1:55:59.12
Women
K1 (22,60 km)	Dorina Fekete (HUN)	1:49:47.77	Pernille Hostrup (DEN)	1:49:48.87	Panna Csépe (HUN)	1:49:49.53

=== Junior ===
Event	Gold		Silver		Bronze	
Men
K1 (22,60 km)	Bertram Sørensen (DEN)	1:41:27.41	Francisco Santos (POR)	1:41:28.40	Olivér Varga (HUN)	1:42:18.78
C1 (19,00 km)	Eryk Wilga (POL)	1:37:46.55	Péter Soltész (HUN)	1:38:14.58	Tamás Szöllősi (HUN)	1:38:35.39
K2 (22,60 km)	Spain; Jesús Machado; Daniel Estébanez	1:37:19.74	Hungary; Áron Márialigeti; András Terei	1:37:21.16	Denmark; Nikolaj Bryde; Bertram Sørensen	1:37:44.47
C2 (19,00 km)	Hungary; Mihály Pluzsik; Tamás Szöllősi	1:31:53.06	Hungary; Máté Perhács; Péter Soltész	1:32:40.69	Spain; Izan Velasco; Daniel Infantes	1:32:58.33
Women
K1 (19,00 km)	Zsófia Szerafin (HUN)	1:36:17.47	Hannah Andersen (DEN)	1:36:26.89	Greta Roeser (GBR)	1:36:45.48
C1 (11,80 km)	Anastasia Dezhytska (UKR)	1:09:06.32	Imola Batka (HUN)	1:09:44.68	Anna Gorinsky (ESP)	1:11:36.80
K2 (19,00 km)	Hungary; Réka Paróczi; Renáta Karászi	1:27:52.91	Hungary; Kinga Molnár; Hanna Józsa	1:28:03.77	Great Britain; Greta Roeser; Nerys Hall	1:30:21.22

== Medal table ==
* Host nation (Denmark)

Rank	Nation	Gold	Silver	Bronze	Total
1	Hungary (HUN)	6	7	4	17
2	Spain (ESP)	4	4	8	16
3	Denmark (DEN)*	4	2	2	8
4	Poland (POL)	3	2	1	6
5	Ukraine (UKR)	3	0	0	3
6	Sweden (SWE)	1	0	0	1
7	Great Britain (GBR)	0	4	3	7
8	Portugal (POR)	0	1	2	3
9	France (FRA)	0	1	1	2
Totals (9 entries)		21	21	21	63

== Participants ==
A total of 233 canoeists from the national teams of the following 17 countries was registered to compete at 2022 Canoe Marathon European Championships.

- Austria (3)
- Belgium (5)
- Czech Republic (5)
- Denmark (25)
- France (11)
- Germany (16)
- Great Britain (15)
- Hungary (33)
- Ireland (8)
- Netherlands (2)
- Norway (11)
- Poland (7)
- Portugal (12)
- Serbia (1)
- Spain (44)
- Sweden (11)
- Ukraine (24)
