= Mara Santos =

Spanish marathon canoer (born 1969)

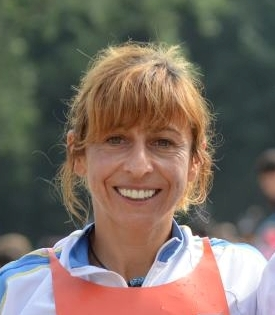

Personal information
- Full name: Mara Santos García
- Nationality: Spanish
- Born: 25 May 1969 (age 57) Velilla del Río Carrión, Palencia, Spain

Sport
- Country: Spain
- Sport: Canoe racing
- Event: Canoe marathon
- Turned pro: 1984
- Retired: 2012
Medal record
Women's canoe marathon
World Championships
Gold medal – first place	2000 Duisburg	K-1
Silver medal – second place	2002 Gainesville	K-1
Silver medal – second place	2003 Zagreb	K-1
Silver medal – second place	2001 Szeged	K-1
Bronze medal – third place	2007 Duisburg	K-1

Mara Santos García (born 25 May 1969 in Velilla del Río Carrión) is a Spanish marathon canoeist who has competed since 1985 to 2012. Competing in Canoe Marathon World Championships, she has won five gold medals, two silvers and two bronzes. She holds the record for victories in the International Sella River Descent, in Ribadesella (Asturias).

== See also ==
- 1999 Canoe Marathon European Championships
