= Vivien Folláth =

Hungarian canoeist

Medal record

Women's canoe sprint

World Championships
Gold medal – first place	2010 Poznań	K-1 5000 m

Women's canoe marathon

World Championships
Gold medal – first place	2008 Týn nad Vltavou	K-1
Silver medal – second place	2005 Perth	K-1

Vivien Folláth is a Hungarian sprint canoer and marathon canoeist who has competed since the mid-2000s. She won a gold medal in the K-1 5000 m event at the 2010 ICF Canoe Sprint World Championships in Poznań.
