= 2023 ICF Canoe Marathon World Championships =

International canoe competition

- Location: Vejen, Denmark
- Dates: 31 August to 3 September 2023

The 2023 ICF Canoe Marathon World Championships was held from 31 August to 3 September 2023 in Vejen, Denmark.

== Schedule ==
All times are local time (Central European Summer Time).

Date	Time	Event
31 August	8:30	K1 Women Junior
31 August	8:35	C1 Women Junior
31 August	10:35	K1 Women - Short Race Heat 1
31 August	11:00	K1 Women - Short Race Heat 2
31 August	11:25	K1 Men - Short Race Heat 1
31 August	11:45	K1 Men - Short Race Heat 2
31 August	14:30	C1 Men Junior
31 August	16:45	C1 Women - Short Race Final
31 August	17:15	C1 Men - Short Race Final
31 August	17:45	K1 Women - Short Race Final
31 August	18:15	K1 Men - Short Race Final
1 September	8:50	K2 Women Junior
1 September	8:55	C1 Men Under 23
1 September	14:30	K1 Women Under 23
1 September	14:35	C2 Men Junior
1 September	14:40	C1 Women Under 23
1 September	16:45	K1 Men Under 23
2 September	8:50	K1 Men Junior
2 September	8:55	C1 Women
2 September	11:00	C1 Men
2 September	14:15	K1 Women
2 September	16:30	K1 Men
3 September	8:50	K2 Men Junior
3 September	8:55	C2 Men
3 September	11:00	K2 Women
3 September	14:00	K2 Men

== Medalists ==
=== Senior ===
Event	Gold		Silver		Bronze	
Men's C-1 (21,00 km)	Manuel Campos; Spain	1:43:35.11	Márton Kövér; Hungary	1:43:35.67	Manuel Garrido; Spain	1:44:00.00
Men's C-2 (21,00 km)	Manuel Campos; Diego Romero; Spain	1:37:29.06	Fernando Busto; Diego Miguéns; Spain	1:37:41.21	Mateusz Zuchora; Mateusz Borgiel; Poland	1:38:05.63
Men's K-1 (27,60 km)	Mads Pedersen; Denmark	1:57:57.48	Andrew Birkett; South Africa	2:00:29.33	Eivind Vold; Norway	2:00:30.20
Men's K-2 (27,60 km)	José Ramalho; Fernando Pimenta; Portugal	1:54:35.11	Quentin Urban; Jérémy Candy; France	1:54:35.89	Jon Vold; Eivind Vold; Norway	1:54:36.42
Women's C-1 (14,40 km)	Liudmyla Babak; Ukraine	1:18:49.00	Olena Tsyhankova; Ukraine	1:20:10.24	Paulina Grzelkiewicz; Poland	1:22:00.90
Women's K-1 (24,30 km)	Vanda Kiszli; Hungary	1:56:58.92	Melina Andersson; Sweden	1:58:50.10	Christie Mackenzie; South Africa	1:59:05.43
Women's K-2 (24,30 km)	Vanda Kiszli; Emese Kőhalmi; Hungary	1:53:31.57	Tania Fernández; Tania Álvarez; Spain	1:53:32.00	Csilla Rugási; Panna Csépe; Hungary	1:53:32.45

=== Senior short race ===
Event	Gold		Silver		Bronze	
Men's C-1 (3,40 km)	Manuel Campos; Spain	16:34.89	Mateusz Zuchora; Poland	16:44.55	Mateusz Borgiel; Poland	16:51.98
Men's K-1 (3,40 km)	Fernando Pimenta; Portugal	14:14.32	Mads Pedersen; Denmark	14:15.85	Eivind Vold; Norway	14:28.66
Women's C-1 (3,40 km)	Zsófia Kisbán; Hungary	18:49.34	Liudmyla Babak; Ukraine	19:16.47	Olena Tsyhankova; Ukraine	19:42.64
Women's K-1 (3,40 km)	Melina Andersson; Sweden	15:55.88	Vanda Kiszli; Hungary	15:56.65	Eva Barrios; Spain	16:04.08

=== Under-23 ===
Event	Gold		Silver		Bronze	
Men's C-1 (17,70 km)	Jaime Duro; Spain	1:34:08.94	Eryk Wilga; Poland	1:35:19.40	Diego Piñeiro; Spain	1:36:06.15
Men's K-1 (24,30 km)	Ronan Foley; Ireland	1:46:42.84	Philip Knudsen; Denmark	1:46:48.64	Francisco Santos; Portugal	1:46:49.84
Women's C-1 (11,00 km)	Annette Wehrmann; Germany	1:03:13.13	Alžběta Veverková; Czech Republic	1:05:26.66	Karolina Hegedűs; Hungary	1:05:33.77
Women's K-1 (21,00 km)	Panna Csépe; Hungary	1:42:50.17	Kateřina Mílová; Czech Republic	1:43:07.89	Saskia Hockly; South Africa	1:43:36.22

=== Junior ===
Event	Gold		Silver		Bronze	
Men's C-1 (14,40 km)	Mihály Pluzsik; Hungary	1:12:52.49	Dario Sanchez; Spain	1:13:47.26	Botond Méri; Hungary	1:14:01.05
Men's C-2 (14,40 km)	Mátyás Ludányi; Adam Vonga; Hungary	1:08:23.86	Alex Wilga; Krystian Kubica; Poland	1:09:29.62	Izan Velasco; Daniel Infantes; Spain	1:09:53.37
Men's K-1 (21,00 km)	Vicente Vergauven; Argentina	1:34:54.03	Joaquín Catalano; Argentina	1:34:55.67	Árpád Kékesi; Hungary	1:34:57.00
Men's K-2 (21,00 km)	Vicente Vergauven; Joaquín Catalano; Argentina	1:31:13.37	Dániel Zemen; Árpád Kékesi; Hungary	1:31:26.07	Ruben Castilla; Arturo Aguilar; Spain	1:31:36.58
Women's C-1 (11,10 km)	Nerea Novo; Spain	1:04:52.03	Imola Batka; Hungary	1:05:07.16	Francesca Vigorito; Italy	1:05:42.81
Women's K-1 (17,70 km)	Zsófia Szerafin; Hungary	1:27:16.44	Greta Roeser; Great Britain	1:27:32.85	Martina Catalano; Argentina	1:27:45.21
Women's K-2 (17,70 km)	Georgia Singe; Holly Smith; South Africa	1:21:26.73	Maria Martinez; Lidia Zornoza; Spain	1:21:29.80	Janka Reisz; Klaudia Kmetyo; Hungary	1:21:31.77

== Medal table ==
* Host nation (Denmark)

Rank	Nation	Gold	Silver	Bronze	Total
1	Hungary	7	4	5	16
2	Spain	5	4	5	14
3	Argentina	2	1	1	4
4	Portugal	2	0	1	3
5	Ukraine	1	2	1	4
6	Denmark*	1	2	0	3
7	South Africa	1	1	2	4
8	Sweden	1	1	0	2
9	Germany	1	0	0	1
9	Ireland	1	0	0	1
11	Poland	0	3	3	6
12	Czech Republic	0	2	0	2
13	France	0	1	0	1
13	Great Britain	0	1	0	1
15	Norway	0	0	3	3
16	Italy	0	0	1	1
Totals (16 entries)		22	22	22	66

Source: Medal table
