= Elisabetta Introini =

Italian canoeist

Personal information
- Nationality: Italian
- Born: 30 November 1961 (age 64) Milan, Italy
- Height: 1.60 m (5 ft 3 in)
- Weight: 52 kg (115 lb)

Sport
- Country: Italy
- Sport: Canoeing
Medal record
Canoe Marathon World Championships
Gold medal – first place	2002 Zamore	Marathon
Silver medal – second place	2001 Stockton-on-Tees	Marathon
Bronze medal – third place	1999 Györ	Marathon

Elisabetta Introini (born 30 November 1961) is an Italian former canoer, that won three medals at the ICF Canoe Marathon World Championships.

== Career ==
She competed in the early 1980s. At the 1980 Summer Olympics in Moscow, she was eliminated in the semifinals of the K-2 500 m event while withdrawing from the heats of the K-1 500 m event.
