= Renáta Csay =

Hungarian canoeist (born 1977)

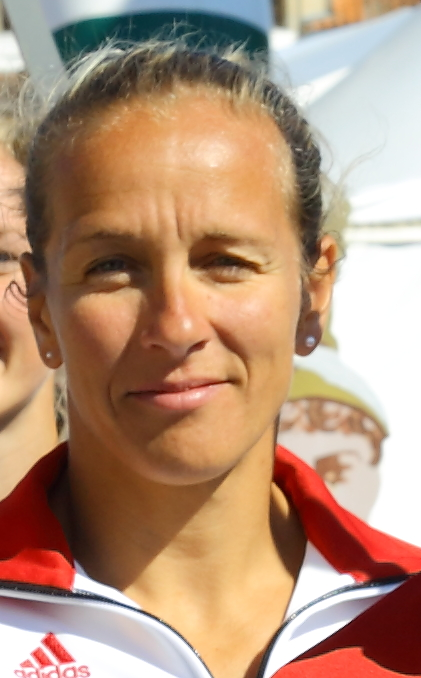
- Csay in 2017

Personal information
- Nickname: Reni
- Born: 21 March 1977 (age 49) Győr, Hungary

Sport
- Country: Hungary
- Sport: Canoe marathon
- Club: Györi Vizisport Egyesület
- Coached by: László Sztanity
Medal record
Representing Hungary
Women's canoe marathon
Event	1st	2nd	3rd
World Championships	20	12	0
European Championships	18	3	0
Total	38	15	0
World Championships
Gold medal – first place	1999 Győr	K-2
Gold medal – first place	2000 Dartmouth	K-2
Gold medal – first place	2002 Zamora	K-2
Gold medal – first place	2003 Valladolid	K-1
Gold medal – first place	2003 Valladolid	K-2
Gold medal – first place	2005 Perth	K-2
Gold medal – first place	2010 Banyoles	K-1
Gold medal – first place	2010 Banyoles	K-2
Gold medal – first place	2011 Singapore	K-1
Gold medal – first place	2011 Singapore	K-2
Gold medal – first place	2012 Rome	K-1
Gold medal – first place	2012 Rome	K-2
Gold medal – first place	2013 Copenhagen	K-1
Gold medal – first place	2014 Oklahoma City	K-1
Gold medal – first place	2014 Oklahoma City	K-2
Gold medal – first place	2015 Győr	K-2
Gold medal – first place	2016 Brandenburg an der Havel	K-1
Gold medal – first place	2016 Brandenburg an der Havel	K-2
Gold medal – first place	2018 Vila Verde	K-2
Gold medal – first place	2019 Shaoxing	K-2
Silver medal – second place	2001 Stockton-on-Tees	K-2
Silver medal – second place	2006 Tremolat	K-1
Silver medal – second place	2006 Tremolat	K-2
Silver medal – second place	2007 Győr	K-1
Silver medal – second place	2007 Győr	K-2
Silver medal – second place	2008 Týn nad Vltavou	K-2
Silver medal – second place	2009 Gaia	K-1
Silver medal – second place	2009 Gaia	K-2
Silver medal – second place	2013 Copenhagen	K-2
Silver medal – second place	2015 Győr	K-1
Silver medal – second place	2017 Pietermaritzburg	K-2
Silver medal – second place	2022 Ponte de Lima	K-2
European Championships
Gold medal – first place	1999 Gorzów	K-2
Gold medal – first place	2001 Győr	K-2
Gold medal – first place	2003 Gdańsk	K-1
Gold medal – first place	2003 Gdańsk	K-2
Gold medal – first place	2007 Trenčín	K-1
Gold medal – first place	2007 Trenčín	K-2
Gold medal – first place	2009 Ostróda	K-1
Gold medal – first place	2014 Piešťany	K-1
Gold medal – first place	2015 Bohinj	K-1
Gold medal – first place	2015 Bohinj	K-2
Gold medal – first place	2016 Pontevedra	K-1
Gold medal – first place	2016 Pontevedra	K-2
Gold medal – first place	2017 Ponte de Lima	K-1
Gold medal – first place	2017 Ponte de Lima	K-2
Gold medal – first place	2018 Metković	K-1
Gold medal – first place	2019 Decize	K-1
Gold medal – first place	2019 Decize	K-2
Gold medal – first place	2021 Moscow	K-2
Silver medal – second place	1997 Pavia	K-2
Silver medal – second place	2018 Metković	K-2
Silver medal – second place	2022 Silkeborg	K-2
World Games
Gold medal – first place	2013 Cali	K-1
Gold medal – first place	2013 Cali	K-2
Women's sprint kayak
European Games
Bronze medal – third place	2015 Baku	K-1 5000 m

Renáta Csay (born 21 March 1977) is a former Hungarian marathon canoeist. She is the most successful canoe marathon athlete in history, winning a record twenty World Championships.

== Career ==
Csay began her sporting career at 12 years old. She made her senior international debut at the 1997 Canoe Marathon European Championships and won a silver medal in the K-2 event, with Andrea Pitz. She made her ICF Canoe Marathon World Championships debut in 1999 and won a gold medal in the K-2 event with Pitz. In 2019, she won her 20th career gold medal, twenty years after winning her first world championship.

In February 2024, she announced her retirement. She finished her career with a record 20 gold medals at the Canoe Marathon World Championships, becoming the most successful canoe marathon athlete in history.

== Personal life ==
Csay is married to Gábor Kolozsvári, a former World Champion canoeist. They have two children, a son Brúnó, and a daughter, Lili.
