= 2019 Canoe Marathon European Championships =

- Location: Decize, France
- Dates: 25–28 July

The 2019 Canoe Marathon European Championships took place between 25 and 28 July 2019 at Decize, France. The competition consisted of twenty-one events – twelve in kayak and nine in canoe – shared between junior, under-23 and senior categories.

== Medalists ==
=== Seniors ===
| Event | Gold | Time | Silver | Time | Bronze | Time |
|---|---|---|---|---|---|---|
| Men's C-1 short race | Wiktor Głazunow (POL) | 15:37.73 | Manuel Campos (ESP) | 15:43.02 | Jakub Březina (CZE) | 15:46.99 |
| Men's K-1 short race | Cyrille Carré (FRA) | 14:03.61 | Jérémy Candy (FRA) | 14:08.86 | Adrián Boros (HUN) | 14:21.11 |
| Men's C-1 | Manuel Campos (ESP) | 2:02:11.02 | Jakub Březina (CZE) | 2:02:24.26 | Dániel Laczó (HUN) | 2:03:13.69 |
| Men's C-2 | Poland (POL); Mateusz Zuchora; Mateusz Borgiel | 1:56:10.06 | Hungary (HUN); Márton Kövér; Ádám Dóczé | 1:56:11.60 | Spain (ESP); Manuel Campos; Diego Romero | 1:57:23.57 |
| Men's K-1 | Mads Pedersen (DEN) | 2:04:31.39 | Stéphane Boulanger (FRA) | 2:06:22.09 | Iván Alonso (ESP) | 2:06:40.67 |
| Men's K-2 | France (FRA); Quentin Urban; Jérémy Candy | 1:57:20.42 | Hungary (HUN); Adrián Boros; Krisztián Máthé | 1:57:22.06 | Spain (ESP); Miguel Fernández; José Julián | 1:57:27.86 |
| Women's C-1 short race | Liudmyla Babak (UKR) | 18:57.30 | Dóra Horányi (HUN) | 19:04.10 | Regina Bonyai (HUN) | 19:19.71 |
| Women's K-1 short race | Zsófia Czéllai-Vörös (HUN) | 15:29.92 | Eva Barrios (ESP) | 15:35.82 | Lizzie Broughton (GBR) | 15:40.31 |
| Women's C-1 | Liudmyla Babak (UKR) | 1:23:21.59 | Marine Sansinena (FRA) | 1:24:26.99 | Dóra Horányi (HUN) | 1:25:19.71 |
| Women's K-1 | Renáta Csay (HUN) | 2:03:27.58 | Zsófia Czéllai-Vörös (HUN) | 2:03:45.32 | Anna Kožíšková (CZE) | 2:04:19.50 |
| Women's K-2 | Hungary (HUN); Renáta Csay; Zsófia Czéllai-Vörös | 1:54:30.32 | Spain (ESP); Tania Álvarez; Tania Fernández | 1:55:55.63 | Spain (ESP); Eva Barrios; Amaia Osaba | 1:56:59.29 |

=== Under 23 ===
| Event | Gold | Time | Silver | Time | Bronze | Time |
|---|---|---|---|---|---|---|
| Men's C-1 | Denis Davydov (UKR) | 1:50:39.99 | Sérgio Maciel (POR) | 1:51:31.40 | Mateusz Borgiel (POL) | 1:53:12.83 |
| Men's K-1 | Mads Pedersen (DEN) | 1:52:51.05 | Thorbjørn Rask (DEN) | 1:53:23.76 | Adriano Conceição (POR) | 1:58:01.78 |
| Women's K-1 | Lili Katona (HUN) | 1:48:08.80 | Irati Osa (ESP) | 1:48:09.56 | Teresa Isotta (ITA) | 1:49:21.07 |

=== Juniors ===
| Event | Gold | Time | Silver | Time | Bronze | Time |
|---|---|---|---|---|---|---|
| Men's C-1 | Balázs Palla (HUN) | 1:38:51.65 | León Villalba (ESP) | 1:39:15.35 | Marco Oliveira (POR) | 1:39:23.14 |
| Men's C-2 | Hungary (HUN); Olivér Nagy; Boldizsar Bekesi | 1:30:47.74 | Ukraine (UKR); Kyrylo Krasinskyi; Anton Matsaenko | 1:31:07.56 | Hungary (HUN); David Halasz; Balázs Palla | 1:31:46.13 |
| Men's K-1 | Vince Petró (HUN) | 1:40:09.69 | Nikolai Thomsen (DEN) | 1:41:12.81 | Tim Dowden (GBR) | 1:41:40.04 |
| Men's K-2 | Denmark (DEN); Noah Pedersen; Silas Runholm | 1:35:35.46 | Spain (ESP); Alejandro Moreno; Joaquin Iglesias | 1:35:53.29 | Hungary (HUN); Benedek Szegvari; Adam Kiss | 1:37:05.04 |
| Women's C-1 | Clémence Leblanc (FRA) | 1:07:44.10 | Dóra Horányi (HUN) | 1:07:59.30 | Brenda Kálmán (HUN) | 1:09:17.84 |
| Women's K-1 | Sara Makrai (HUN) | 1:31:43.46 | Joke Plas (BEL) | 1:31:50.14 | Eszter Csonka (HUN) | 1:32:03.94 |
| Women's K-2 | Hungary (HUN); Eszter Csonka; Evelin Csengeri | 1:24:57.16 | Hungary (HUN); Csenge Kulcsar; Viktoria Pardi | 1:26:06.83 | Slovakia (SVK); Katarína Pecsuková; Karolína Seregiová | 1:26:16.36 |

== Medal table ==
* Host nation (France)

| Rank | Nation | Gold | Silver | Bronze | Total |
|---|---|---|---|---|---|
| 1 | Hungary | 9 | 6 | 8 | 23 |
| 2 | France* | 3 | 3 | 0 | 6 |
| 3 | Denmark | 3 | 2 | 0 | 5 |
| 4 | Ukraine | 3 | 1 | 0 | 4 |
| 5 | Poland | 2 | 0 | 1 | 3 |
| 6 | Spain | 1 | 6 | 4 | 11 |
| 7 | Czech Republic | 0 | 1 | 2 | 3 |
| 7 | Portugal | 0 | 1 | 2 | 3 |
| 9 | Belgium | 0 | 1 | 0 | 1 |
| 10 | Great Britain | 0 | 0 | 2 | 2 |
| 11 | Italy | 0 | 0 | 1 | 1 |
| 11 | Slovakia | 0 | 0 | 1 | 1 |
| Totals (12 entries) | | 21 | 21 | 21 | 63 |
