= Mads Pedersen (canoeist) =

Danish canoeist

Personal information
- Full name: Mads Brandt Pedersen
- Nationality: Danish
- Born: 4 July 1996 (age 30)

Sport
- Country: Denmark
- Sport: Marathon and sprint kayak
Medal record
Men's canoe sprint
Representing Denmark
World Championships
Gold medal – first place	2023 Duisburg	K-1 5000 m
Gold medal – first place	2024 Samarkand	K-1 5000 m
Gold medal – first place	2025 Milan	K-1 5000 m
Bronze medal – third place	2021 Copenhagen	K-1 5000 m
Bronze medal – third place	2026 Poznań	K-1 5000 m
European Championships
Silver medal – second place	2026 Montemor-o-Velho	K-1 5000 m
Bronze medal – third place	2024 Szeged	K-1 5000 m
Bronze medal – third place	2025 Racice	K-1 5000 m
Men's canoe marathon
World Games
Gold medal – first place	2022 Birmingham	K-1 short race
Gold medal – first place	2025 Chengdu	K-1 short race
Gold medal – first place	2025 Chengdu	K-1
Silver medal – second place	2022 Birmingham	K-1
World Championships
Gold medal – first place	2019 Shaoxing	K-1
Gold medal – first place	2021 Pitești	K-1
Gold medal – first place	2023 Vejen	K-1
Gold medal – first place	2024 Metković	K-1 short race
Gold medal – first place	2024 Metković	K-1
Gold medal – first place	2025 Győr	K-1
Gold medal – first place	2026 Gualeguaychú	K-1
Silver medal – second place	2021 Pitești	K-1 short race
Silver medal – second place	2022 Ponte de Lima	K-1 short race
Silver medal – second place	2023 Vejen	K-1 short race
Silver medal – second place	2025 Győr	K-1 short race
Silver medal – second place	2025 Győr	K-2
Bronze medal – third place	2022 Ponte de Lima	K-1
European Championships
Gold medal – first place	2019 Decize	K-1
Gold medal – first place	2022 Silkeborg	K-1
Gold medal – first place	2022 Silkeborg	K-1 short race
Gold medal – first place	2023 Brod	K-1
Gold medal – first place	2024 Poznań	K-1
Gold medal – first place	2024 Poznań	K-1 short race
Bronze medal – third place	2016 Pontevedra	K-2
Bronze medal – third place	2023 Brod	K-1 short race

Mads Brandt Pedersen (born 4 July 1996) is a Danish sprint and marathon canoeist.

== Career ==
He competed at the 2021 ICF Canoe Sprint World Championships, winning a bronze medal in the K-1 5000 m distance.
