= 2024 Canoe Marathon European Championships =

Canoeing championship

- Venue: Malta Regatta Course
- Location: Poznań, Poland
- Dates: 25–28 July

The 2024 Canoe Marathon European Championships was held from 25 to 28 July 2024 in Poznań, Poland.

== Medal table ==
* Host nation (Poland)

Rank	Nation	Gold	Silver	Bronze	Total
1	Poland (POL)*	6	2	0	8
2	Hungary (HUN)	5	4	9	18
3	Denmark (DEN)	5	2	1	8
4	Portugal (POR)	3	2	1	6
5	Spain (ESP)	2	3	6	11
6	Ukraine (UKR)	2	1	1	4
7	Germany (GER)	1	1	0	2
8	France (FRA)	0	2	2	4
8	Italy (ITA)	0	2	2	4
10	Czech Republic (CZE)	0	2	0	2
11	Norway (NOR)	0	1	0	1
11	Serbia (SRB)	0	1	0	1
11	Sweden (SWE)	0	1	0	1
14	Great Britain (GBR)	0	0	2	2
Totals (14 entries)		24	24	24	72

== Medalists ==
=== Senior ===
Event	Gold		Silver		Bronze	
Men
K1 Short Race (3.40 km)	Mads Pedersen (DEN)	14:30.42	Jon Vold (NOR)	14:49.56	James Russell (GBR)	14:56.55
C1 Short Race (3.40 km)	Mateusz Borgiel (POL)	16:58.31	Ignacio Calvo (ESP)	17:23.13	Rui Lacerda (POR)	17:24.33
K1 (29.80 km)	Mads Pedersen (DEN)	2:07:42.29	Jérémy Candy (FRA)	2:08:20.05	James Russell (GBR)	2:12:39.00
C1 (22.60 km)	Manuel Campos (ESP)	1:52:34.02	Rui Lacerda (POR)	1:52:43.87	Diego Romero (ESP)	1:53:04.78
K2 (29.80 km)	Denmark; Søren Maretti; Philip Knudsen	2:06:25.04	France; Quentin Urban; Jérémy Candy	2:06:25.70	Spain; Miguel Llorens; Alberto Plaza	2:06:26.25
C2 (22.60 km)	Poland; Mateusz Borgiel; Mateusz Zuchora	1:48:30.44	Portugal; Rui Lacerda; Ricardo Coelho	1:50:30.29	Spain; Manuel Campos; Diego Romero	1:51:05.15
Women
K1 Short Race (3.40 km)	Vanda Kiszli (HUN)	16:39.01	Kristina Bedeč (SRB)	16:58.04	Susanna Cicali (ITA)	17:14.78
C1 Short Race (3.40 km)	Liudmyla Babak (UKR)	19:32.96	Olena Tsyhankova (UKR)	19:51.69	Yseline Huet (FRA)	20:01.75
K1 (26.20 km)	Vanda Kiszli (HUN)	2:06:10.32	Tania Álvarez (ESP)	2:08:47.99	Zsófia Czéliai-Vörös (HUN)	2:08:48.97
C1 (15.40 km)	Liudmyla Babak (UKR)	1:25:30.58	Paulina Grzelkiewicz (POL)	1:26:37.79	Yseline Huet (FRA)	1:27:20.98
K2 (26.20 km)	Spain; Irati Osa; Arantza Toledo	2:02:33.26	Hungary; Vanda Kiszli; Zsófia Czéllai-Vörös	2:03:56.98	Hungary; Panna Csépe; Panna Sinkó	2:04:03.88

=== Under 23 ===
Event	Gold		Silver		Bronze	
Men
K1 (26.20 km)	Philip Knudsen (DEN)	1:57:38.60	Joaquín Iglesias (ESP)	1:58:26.84	Csanád Sellyei (HUN)	1:58:27.39
C1 (19.00 km)	Eryk Wilga (POL)	1:36:23.10	Mihály Pluzsik (HUN)	1:37:01.62	Kevin Longo (ESP)	1:38:05.87
Women
K1 (22.60 km)	Pernille Hostrup (DEN)	1:51:26.95	Panna Sinkó (HUN)	1:51:28.16	Panna Csépe (HUN)	1:51:28.81
C1 (11.80 km)	Annette Wehrmann (GER)	1:06:40.76	Alžběta Veverková (CZE)	1:08:19.91	Lili Matkovics (HUN)	1:08:48.37

=== Junior ===
Event	Gold		Silver		Bronze	
Men
K1 Short Race (3.40 km)	Dániel Zemen (HUN)	15:40.01	Arvid Soderman (SWE)	15:42.63	Anton Hinge (DEN)	15:43.51
C1 (15.40 km)	Alex Wilga (POL)	1:20:28.58	Krystian Kubica (POL)	1:20:54.96	Marcell Meri (HUN)	1:21:11.48
K1 (22.60 km)	Dániel Zemen (HUN)	1:44:06.40	Leonardo Candela (ITA)	1:44:07.70	Tamas Ivancso (HUN)	1:44:08.70
K2 (22.60 km)	Portugal; João Sousa; Francisco Batista	1:39:01.61	Italy; Giovanni Penasa; Daniel Allen	1:40:52.86	Hungary; Benedek Hoffer; Mihály Erdész	1:41:23.06
C2 (15.40 km)	Poland; Krystian Kubica; Alex Wilga	1:14:15.81	Hungary; Zsombor Szegi; Bonifac Koleszár	1:15:24.73	Ukraine; Artem Bocheliuk; Maksym Lavrenchuk	1:16:28.04
Women
K1 Short Race (3.40 km)	Maria Gomes (POR)	18:06.29	Karen Andersen (DEN)	18:18.00	Laura Figaredo (ESP)	18:22.04
K1 (19.00 km)	Maria Gomes (POR)	1:37:30.75	Karen Andersen (DEN)	1:37:35.13	Beatrice Candela (ITA)	1:37:59.30
C1 (11.80 km)	Agata Kowalak (POL)	1:09:41.19	Tereza Kodetová (CZE)	1:10:30.96	Candela Romero (ESP)	1:14:10.07
K2 (19.00 km)	Hungary; Panni Hudi-Kadler; Panka Zatykó	1:28:12.03	Germany; Lotte Liwowski; Caroline Heuser	1:28:59.01	Hungary; Janka Reisz; Klaudia Kmetyó	1:30:24.78
