= 2022 ICF Canoe Marathon World Championships =

International canoe competition

- Location: Ponte de Lima, Portugal
- Dates: 29 September to 2 October 2022

The 2022 ICF Canoe Marathon World Championships was held from 29 September to 2 October 2022 in Ponte de Lima, Portugal. Also in Para Marathon for first time and Masters.

== Schedule ==
All times are local time (Central European Summer Time).

Date	Time	Event
29 September	9:00	K1 Women Juniors
29 September	9:05	C1 Women Juniors
29 September	11:00	K1 Women - Short Race Heat 1
29 September	11:25	K1 Women - Short Race Heat 2
29 September	11:50	K1 Men - Short Race Heat 1
29 September	12:15	K1 Men - Short Race Heat 2
29 September	14:00	C1 Men Juniors
29 September	16:15	C1 Women - Short Race Final
29 September	16:45	C1 Men - Short Race Final
29 September	17:15	K1 Women - Short Race Final
29 September	17:45	K1 Men - Short Race Final
30 September	9:00	K2 Women Juniors
30 September	9:05	C1 Men Under 23
30 September	14:30	K1 Women Under 23
30 September	14:35	C2 Men Juniors
30 September	16:30	K1 Men Under 23
1 October	9:00	K1 Men Juniors
1 October	9:05	C1 Women
1 October	11:15	C1 Men
1 October	13:45	K1 Women
1 October	16:15	K1 Men
2 October	8:50	K2 Men Juniors
2 October	8:55	C2 Men
2 October	11:15	K2 Women
2 October	14:00	K2 Men

== Medalists ==
=== Senior ===
Event	Gold		Silver		Bronze	
Men's C-1 (15,40 km)	Manuel Garrido; Spain	2:04:52.36	Márton Kövér; Hungary	2:05:03.19	Manuel Campos; Spain	2:10:03.02
Men's C-2 (26,20 km)	Manuel Campos; Diego Romero; Spain	2:01:10.75	Fernando Busto; Diego Miguéns; Spain	2:01:15.34	Mateusz Borgiel; Mateusz Zuchora; Poland	2:01:42.03
Men's K-1 (29,80 km)	Andrew Birkett; South Africa	2:08:25.94	José Ramalho; Portugal	2:08:27.04	Mads Pedersen; Denmark	2:08:27.36
Men's K-2 (29,80 km)	José Ramalho; Fernando Pimenta; Portugal	1:58:04.39	Miguel Llorens; Alberto Plaza; Spain	1:58:10.40	Eivind Vold; Amund Vold; Norway	1:58:15.43
Women's C-1 (15,40 km)	Liudmyla Babak; Ukraine	1:25:49.80	Zsófia Kisbán; Hungary	1:27:40.44	Bethany Gill; Great Britain	1:28:28.80
Women's K-1 (26,20 km)	Vanda Kiszli; Hungary	2:05:55.35	Melina Andersson; Sweden	2:05:56.99	Samantha Rees-Clark; Great Britain	2:06:18.97
Women's K-2 (26,20 km)	Tania Fernández; Tania Álvarez; Spain	1:58:09.56	Renáta Csay; Zsófia Czéllai; Hungary	1:58:19.10	Melina Andersson; Johanna Johansson; Sweden	1:58:32.87

=== Senior short race ===
Event	Gold		Silver		Bronze	
Men's C-1 (3,40 km)	Diego Romero; Spain	14:55.07	Jaime Duro; Spain	14:57.15	Mateusz Kamiński; Poland	15:15.63
Men's K-1 (3,40 km)	Fernando Pimenta; Portugal	12:49.12	Mads Pedersen; Denmark	12:49.77	Iván Alonso; Spain	13:08.60
Women's C-1 (3,40 km)	Bethany Gill; Great Britain	17:27.18	Zsófia Kisbán; Hungary	17:31.78	Beatriz Fernandes; Portugal	17:34.40
Women's K-1 (3,40 km)	Melina Andersson; Sweden	14:22.83	Estefania Fernández; Spain	14:24.79	Samantha Rees-Clark; Great Britain	14:29.30

=== Under-23 ===
Event	Gold		Silver		Bronze	
Men's C-1 (22,60 km)	Jaime Duro; Spain	1:52:19.88	Sebestyén Simon; Hungary	1:53:34.95	Diego Piñeiro; Spain	1:54:59.62
Men's K-1 (26,20 km)	Hamish Lovemore; South Africa	1:54:18.42	Philip Knudsen; Denmark	1:54:20.50	Ulvard Hart; South Africa	1:54:24.33
Women's K-1 (22,60 km)	Melina Andersson; Sweden	1:49:30.97	Panna Csépe; Hungary	1:52:11.26	Christie Mackenzie; South Africa	1:52:33.40

=== Junior ===
Event	Gold		Silver		Bronze	
Men's C-1 (19,00 km)	Darío Sánchez; Spain	1:39:31.46	Eryk Wilga; Poland	1:39:43.96	Joel Miranda; Portugal	1:40:38.68
Men's C-2 (19,00 km)	Zsombor Szegi; Péter Soltész; Hungary	1:33:53.25	Mihály Pluzsik; Tamás Szöllősi; Hungary	1:34:08.36	Izan Velasco; Daniel Infantes; Spain	1:34:49.00
Men's K-1 (22,60 km)	Bruno Kolozsvári; Hungary	1:40:30.32	Julian Salinas; Argentina	1:40:36.56	Bertram Sørensen; Denmark	1:41:41.74
Men's K-2 (22,60 km)	Olivér Varga; Bruno Kolozsvári; Hungary	1:34:32.36	Baltazar Itria; Julian Salinas; Argentina	1:34:33.69	Vicente Vergauven; Joaquín Catalano; Argentina	1:34:40.36
Women's C-1 (11,80 km)	Beatriz Fernandes; Portugal	1:09:06.39	Anastasia Dezhytska; Ukraine	1:10:46.21	Ana Pereira; Portugal	1:12:28.13
Women's K-1 (19,00 km)	Kata Horváth; Hungary	1:36:23.11	Zsófia Szerafin; Hungary	1:36:31.97	Saskia Hockly; South Africa	1:37:28.61
Women's K-2 (19,00 km)	Kinga Molnár; Hanna Józsa; Hungary	1:29:08.56	Saskia Hockly; Valma Hockly; South Africa	1:29:28.83	Lidia Zornoza; Alba Esteban; Spain	1:31:40.00

== Medal table ==
* Host nation (Portugal)

Rank	Nation	Gold	Silver	Bronze	Total
1	Hungary	6	8	0	14
2	Spain	6	4	5	15
3	Portugal*	3	1	3	7
4	South Africa	2	1	3	6
5	Sweden	2	1	1	4
6	Ukraine	1	1	0	2
7	Great Britain	1	0	3	4
8	Denmark	0	2	2	4
9	Argentina	0	2	1	3
10	Poland	0	1	2	3
11	Norway	0	0	1	1
Totals (11 entries)		21	21	21	63
