= ICF Canoe Marathon World Cup =

The ICF Canoe Marathon World Cup is an annual season-long series of top level races in Canoe Marathon held under the auspices of the International Canoe Federation.

== Editions ==
#	Year	Host city	Host country	Events
1	1989			
2	2004			
3	2005			
4	2008			
5	2010	Worcester	Grande Bretagne	
6	2011	Rome	Italie	
7	2012	Copenhagen		
8	2013	Oklahoma City	United States	
9	2014	Bohinj	Slovenia	
10	2015	Brandenburg	Germany	
11	2016	Pietermaritzburg	South Africa	
12	2016	prado vila verde	Portugal	
13	2018	Viana Do Castelo	Portugal	
14	2019	Baerum	Norway	
15	2023	Ruse	Bulgaria	
16	2024	Brandenburg an der Havel	Germany	
17	2026	Bazhong	China	
