= Denys Davydov =

Ukrainian citizen journalist and YouTuber

- Born: 27 February 1987 (age 39); Sevastopol, Ukrainian SSR, Soviet Union
- Occupations: Aviator (on hold); YouTuber; military analyst

YouTube information
- Channels: Denys Davydov; Pilot Blog
- Years active: 2014–present
- Genres: Analysis of the Russo-Ukrainian war; global politics; aviation
- Subscribers: 2.3 million (combined) (Note: 1 million (Denys Davydov) + 1.37 million (Pilot Blog))
- Views: 1.3 billion (combined) (Note: 882 million (Denys Davydov) + 483 million (Pilot Blog))
- Last updated: 17 November 2026

Denys Davydov (Ukrainian: Денис Давидов; born 27 February 1987) is a Ukrainian citizen journalist who operates primarily on YouTube and Telegram, and is best known for his coverage and analysis of the Russo-Ukrainian war. His main YouTube channel, Denys Davydov, which has over one million subscribers, became the most followed channel run by an individual covering the war in Ukraine in May 2022. The English-language Ukrainian press Kyiv Post has called Davydov "one of YouTube's most recognizable Ukraine experts", with information and commentary made by Davydov being used by multiple media publications since the beginning of the war.

He has 2 other channels, Captain Denys, where he posts content on mostly non Ukraine material, and, Pilot Blog, where he posts mostly aviation material from his perspective as a pilot.

== Career ==
=== Pre-war ===
Davydov was born on 27 February 1987 in Sevastopol, Crimea, Ukrainian SSR. Before the Russian invasion of Ukraine, Davydov was a commercial pilot and Captain working for Ukraine International Airlines, flying multiple aircraft, including the Boeing 737-800, Boeing 737-900 and Boeing 737 Classic aircraft. After the invasion of Ukraine in February 2022, Davydov stopped flying as a pilot with Ukraine International Airlines after the company filed for bankruptcy on 22 November 2023.

=== Russo-Ukrainian war–present ===
After Russia launched its invasion of Ukraine in February 2022, Davydov supported Ukraine as a citizen journalist, providing analysis of the war from Ukraine on his Telegram and YouTube channels. Davydov has continued to cover the war and related events in the form of daily updates since. Around January 2023, Davydov left Ukraine with his family and moved to Switzerland, citing security concerns with remaining where they were.

Information and commentary from Davydov has been used a number of times in the media, including by the English-language Ukrainian press Kyiv Post, the British open-source intelligence company Janes Information Services, the American newspaper The Hill, the British newspaper The Times, and the English-language Italian press The Aviationist. Davydov's commentary, which often revolves around troop movements and strategy, has on occasion materialized on the frontline. An instance of this occurred in 2024 when small Ukrainian aircraft was used to target Russian drones, something Davydov had recommended in a post in 2022. In 2024, Kyiv Post called Davydov "one of YouTube's most recognizable Ukraine experts", and has conducted interviews with him on multiple occasions.

== See also ==
- Open-source intelligence in the Russian invasion of Ukraine
