= Melina Andersson =

Swedish canoeist (born 1999)

Personal information
- Born: 27 July 1999 (age 27) Norrköping, Sweden

Sport
- Country: Sweden
- Sport: Canoe sprint Canoe marathon
- Events: K-1 1000 m, K-1 5000 m
- Club: Bravikens Canoe Club
Medal record
Representing Sweden
Women's canoe sprint
World Championships
Gold medal – first place	2025 Milan	K-1 5000 m
Gold medal – first place	2026 Poznań	K-1 5000 m
Bronze medal – third place	2023 Duisburg	K-1 5000 m
Bronze medal – third place	2024 Samarkand	K-1 1000 m
European Championships
Silver medal – second place	2024 Szeged	K-1 5000 m
Silver medal – second place	2024 Szeged	K-2 1000 m
Silver medal – second place	2025 Račice	K-1 1000 m
Silver medal – second place	2026 Montemor-o-Velho	K-1 1000 m
Silver medal – second place	2026 Montemor-o-Velho	K-1 5000 m
Bronze medal – third place	2024 Szeged	K-1 1000 m
Bronze medal – third place	2025 Račice	K-1 5000 m
Women's canoe marathon
World Championships
Gold medal – first place	2022 Ponte de Lima	K-1 short race
Gold medal – first place	2023 Vejen	K-1 short race
Gold medal – first place	2024 Metković	K-1
Gold medal – first place	2024 Metković	K-1 short race
Gold medal – first place	2025 Győr	K-1
Silver medal – second place	2022 Ponte de Lima	K-1
Silver medal – second place	2023 Vejen	K-1
Silver medal – second place	2025 Győr	K-1 short race
Bronze medal – third place	2022 Ponte de Lima	K-2
Bronze medal – third place	2024 Metković	K-2
European Championships
Gold medal – first place	2022 Silkeborg	K-2
World Games
Gold medal – first place	2025 Chengdu	K-1 short race
Gold medal – first place	2025 Chengdu	K-1

Melina Andersson (born 27 July 1999) is a Swedish canoeist. She represented Sweden at the 2024 Summer Olympics.

== Career ==
In September 2022, Andersson competed at the 2022 ICF Canoe Marathon World Championships and became the first person to win four medals at a single World Championships. She won gold medals in the K-1 short race and K-1 U23 events, a silver medal in the K-1 event, and a bronze medal in the K-2 event.

In June 2023, Andersson competed at the 2023 European Games in the K-1 500 metres event and finished in fifth place. In August 2023, she competed at the 2023 ICF Canoe Sprint World Championships in the K-1 5000 metres event and won a bronze medal. In August 2023, she competed at the 2023 ICF Canoe Marathon World Championships and won a gold medal in the K-1 short race and a silver medal in the K-1 event.

In June 2024, she competed at the 2024 Canoe Sprint European Championships and won silver medals in the K-1 5000 metres and K-2 1000 metres, and a bronze medal in the K-1 1000 metres event. In August 2024, she represented Sweden at the 2024 Summer Olympics in the K-1 500 metres event and finished in fourth place in Final B. She then competed at the 2024 ICF Canoe Sprint World Championships and won a bronze medal in the K–1 1000 metres event.

In August 2025, she competed at the 2025 World Games and won gold medals in the K-1 short distance and K1 long distance events. She then competed at the 2025 ICF Canoe Sprint World Championships and won a gold medal in the K-1 5000 metres with a time of 23:10.86. The next month she competed at the 2025 ICF Canoe Marathon World Championships and won a silver medal in the K-1 short race with a time of 15:24.65.

== Major results ==
=== Olympic Games ===
Year	K-1 500
2024	4 FB

=== World championships ===
Year	K-1 500	K-1 1000	K-1 5000	K-2 500	K-4 500	XK-2 500	XK-4 500
2023	9		3rd place, bronze medalist(s)			—N/a	—N/a
2024	—N/a	3rd place, bronze medalist(s)	DNF	—N/a	—N/a	8	9
2025		4	1st place, gold medalist(s)			—N/a	—N/a
2026			1st place, gold medalist(s)	4 FB	6	—N/a	—N/a
