= Jaime Duro =

Spanish canoeist (born 2000)

Personal information
- Full name: Jaime Duro Pichel
- Born: 4 November 2000 (age 25)

Sport
- Country: Spain
- Sport: Canoe marathon Canoe sprint
- Events: C-1 short race, C-2, C-1 5000 m
Medal record
Representing Spain
Men's canoe marathon
World Championships
Gold medal – first place	2025 Győr	C-1 short race
Silver medal – second place	2022 Ponte de Lima	C-1 short race
Silver medal – second place	2024 Metković	C-2
Silver medal – second place	2025 Győr	C-2
European Championships
Gold medal – first place	2025 Ponte de Lima	C-1 short race
Silver medal – second place	2025 Ponte de Lima	C-2
Men's canoe sprint
World Championships
Silver medal – second place	2025 Milan	C-1 5000 m
Silver medal – second place	2026 Poznań	C-1 5000 m

Jaime Duro Pichel (Note: In this Spanish name, the first or paternal surname is Duro and the second or maternal family name is Pichel.) (born 4 November 2000) is a Spanish canoeist.

== Career ==
In August 2025, he competed at the 2025 ICF Canoe Sprint World Championships and won a silver medal in the C-1 5000 metres with a time of 23:43.67. The next month he competed at the 2025 ICF Canoe Marathon World Championships and won a gold medal in the C-1 short race with a time of 15:22.87.
