= Anne Lolk Thomsen =

Danish rower

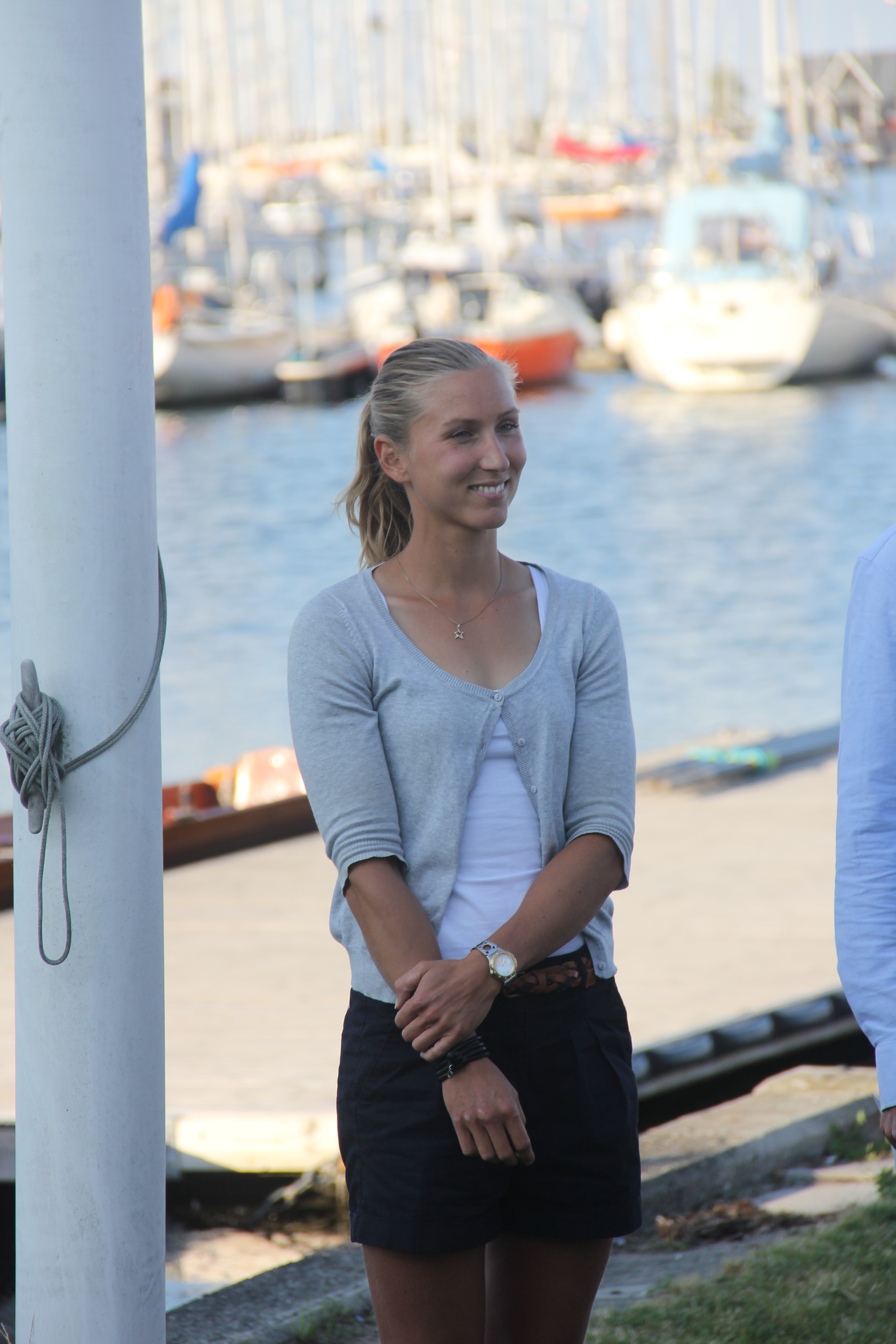
- Anne Lolk Thomsen in 2012

Personal information
- Born: 15 May 1983 (age 43)

Sport
- Sport: Rowing

Anne Lolk Thomsen (born 15 May 1983) is a Danish rower. She competed in the women's lightweight double sculls event at the 2016 Summer Olympics.
