= Kristina Bedeč =

Serbian canoeist (born 1986)

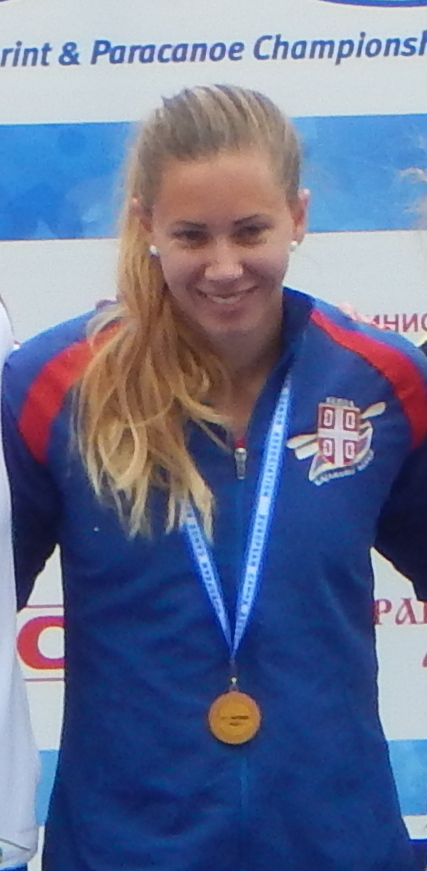
- Bedeč in 2016

Personal information
- Nationality: Serbia
- Born: November 20, 1986 (age 39) Győr, Hungary
- Height: 1.68 m (5 ft 6 in)
- Weight: 59 kg (130 lb)

Sport
- Country: Hungary (until 2011); Austria (2012); Serbia (2013–present)
- Sport: Canoe sprint Canoe marathon
Medal record
Representing Hungary
Women's canoe marathon
World Championships
Silver medal – second place	2011 Singapore	K-2
European Championships
Gold medal – first place	2011 Saint-Jean-de-Losne	K-2
Bronze medal – third place	2011 Saint-Jean-de-Losne	K-1
Representing Serbia
Women's canoe sprint
World Championships
Silver medal – second place	2015 Milan	K-1 1000 m
European Championships
Gold medal – first place	2016 Moscow	K-1 1000 m
Women's canoe marathon
World Championships
Silver medal – second place	2019 Shaoxing	K-1 short race
Bronze medal – third place	2015 Győr	K-1
Bronze medal – third place	2016 Brandenburg	K-1
Bronze medal – third place	2021 Pitești	K-1 short race
European Championships
Gold medal – first place	2021 Moscow	K-1 short race
Silver medal – second place	2023 Brod	K-1 short race
Silver medal – second place	2024 Poznań	K-1 short race
Bronze medal – third place	2021 Moscow	K-1

Kristina Bedeč (Serbian Cyrillic: Кристина Бедеч, also transliterated Kristina Bedec, Hungarian: Bedőcs Krisztina, also transliterated Krisztina Bedoecs; born 20 November 1986) is a Serbian sprint canoer. After representing her country of birth, Hungary, she briefly competed for Austria, and since 2013 she is representing Serbia.

Her biggest successes in canoe sprint are winning the gold medal in women's K-1 1000 m at the 2016 Canoe Sprint European Championships and silver medal in the same discipline at the 2015 Canoe Sprint World Championships.

More recently, in canoe marathon, she has won a silver medal at the Canoe Marathon World Championships in 2019 and gold (and bronze) medal at the Canoe Marathon European Championships in 2021.
