= 2025 ICF Canoe Marathon World Championships =

Canoe competition

- Venue: Mosoni-Danube
- Location: Győr, Hungary
- Dates: 4–7 September

The 2025 ICF Canoe Marathon World Championships were held from 4 to 7 September 2025 in Győr, Hungary. For the first time in the history of the Canoe Marathon World Championships, paracanoe were contested in marathon distances.

== Medalists ==
=== Senior ===
Event	Gold		Silver		Bronze	
Men's C-1 (21.8 km)	Mateusz Zuchora; Poland	1:43:20.20	Mateusz Borgiel; Poland	1:43:23.16	Fernando Busto; Spain	1:43:30.95
Men's C-2 (21.8 km)	Ricardo Coelho; Rui Lacerda; Portugal	1:35:45.63	Jaime Duro; Manuel Garrido; Spain	1:36:34.96	Mateusz Zuchora; Mateusz Borgieł; Poland	1:37:32.65
Men's K-1 (29.2 km)	Mads Pedersen; Denmark	1:58:42.14	Andrew Birkett; South Africa	2:00:19.78	Csanád Sellyei; Hungary	2:00:21.02
Men's K-2 (29.2 km)	José Ramalho; Fernando Pimenta; Portugal	1:54:00.62	Mads Pedersen; Philip Knudsen; Denmark	1:54:01.89	Adrián Boros; Tamás Erdélyi; Hungary	1:54:03.85
Women's C-1 (14.4 km)	Giada Bragato; Hungary	1:17:16.13	Daniela Cociu; Moldova	1:17:45.84	Liudmyla Babak; Ukraine	1:18:18.28
Women's K-1 (25.5 km)	Melina Andersson; Sweden	1:56:38.69	Vanda Kiszli; Hungary	1:56:42.74	Anna Margrete Sletsjøe; Norway	1:58:41.00
Women's K-2 (25.5 km)	Tania Fernández; Tania Alvarez; Spain	1:51:26.22	Zsófia Szerafin; Vanda Kiszli; Hungary	1:51:27.11	Panna Sinkó; Panna Csépe; Hungary	1:51:28.89

=== Senior short race ===
Event	Gold		Silver		Bronze	
Men's C-1 (3.6 km)	Jaime Duro; Spain	15:22.87	Serghei Tarnovschi; Moldova	15:42.30	Balázs Adolf; Hungary	15:48.60
Men's K-1 (3.6 km)	Fernando Pimenta; Portugal	13:37.11	Mads Pedersen; Denmark	13:38.03	José Ramalho; Portugal	13:47.38
Women's C-1 (3.6 km)	Zsófia Csorba; Hungary	18:25.50	Zsófia Kisbán; Hungary	18:29.79	Liudmyla Babak; Ukraine	18:40.95
Women's K-1 (3.6 km)	Zsóka Csikós; Hungary	15:21.64	Melina Andersson; Sweden	15:24.65	Vanda Kiszli; Hungary	15:28.93

=== Under-23 ===
Event	Gold		Silver		Bronze	
Men's C-1 (18.1 km)	Mihaly Pluzsik; Hungary	1:28:31.71	Péter Soltész; Hungary	1:28:38.01	Dario Sanchez; Spain	1:30:14.74
Men's K-1 (25.5 km)	Philip Knudsen; Denmark	1:44:59.83	Pedro Agustin Ratto; Argentina	1:45:38.30	Zalan Peli; Hungary	1:47:22.50
Women's C-1 (10.7 km)	Lili Sára Matkovics; Hungary	5:33.78	Elena Glizan; Moldova	57:57.49	Aleksandra Vlasova; Individual Neutral Athletes	58:35.13
Women's K-1 (21.8 km)	Pernille Hostrup; Denmark	1:43:01.83	Panna Csépe; Hungary	1:43:06.93	Jade Wilson; South Africa	1:43:13.12

=== Junior ===
Event	Gold		Silver		Bronze	
Men's C-1 (14.4 km)	Martin Nováček; Czech Republic	1:11:16.90	Leonardo Barbosa; Portugal	1:12.00.97	Muhammadi Rajabov; Tajikistan	1:12:25.23
Men's C-2 (14.4 km)	Vince Farago-Toth; Abel Farago-Toth; Hungary	1:05:43.05	Illes Hancz; Arnold Gyurós; Hungary	1:07:02.36	Alberto Ruiz; Jorge Pérez; Spain	1:07:44.53
Men's K-1 (21.8 km)	Sean Butterly; Ireland	1:31:22.93	Keegan Vogt; South Africa	1:31:25.67	Ivan Nekrasov; Individual Neutral Athletes	1:32:05.70
Men's K-2 (21.8 km)	Lánczi János Zaránd; Kevin Budai; Hungary	1:28:36.80	William Short; Alexander Worgan; Great Britain	1:28:41.50	Keegan Vogt; Ryley Smith; South Africa	1:28:52.75
Women's C-1 (10.7 km)	Mariia Kharitonova; Individual Neutral Athletes	59:11.48	Nora Fekete; Hungary	59:52.17	Lucía Pizarro Dorado; Spain	1:00:40.32
Women's K-1 (18.1 km)	Lili Kolozsvári; Hungary	1:26:46.04	Karen Stoubæk Andersen; Denmark	1:26:54.99	Dianora De Bilio; Great Britain	1:27:56.54
Women's K-2 (18.1 km)	Panni Hudi-Kadler; Panka Zatykó; Hungary	1:20:09.50	Lotti Jámbor; Reka Katona; Hungary	1:22:07.32	Karen Stoubæk Andersen; Frida Hinge; Denmark	1:23:20.08

=== Junior short race ===
Event	Gold		Silver		Bronze	
Men's K-1 (3.6 km)	William Short; Great Britain	14:28.93	Merse Molnár; Hungary	14:35.05	Orlan Coattrieux; France	14:36.14
Women's K-1 (3.6 km)	Lili Kolozsvári; Hungary	15:54.42	Caroline Heuser; Germany	16:16.58	Janka Reisz; Hungary	16:35.06

=== Paracanoe ===
Event	Gold		Silver		Bronze	
Men's Open (10 km)	Timo Alexander Nowak Lonsdale; Denmark	50:13.06	Pablo Pérez Álvarez; Spain	52:32.51	Clément Bodart; France	52:34.48
Men's KL1 (6 km)	Róbert Suba; Hungary	31:30.05	Péter Pál Kiss; Hungary	32:37.15	Mathieu St-Pierre; Canada	35:05.12
Men's KL2 (10 km)	Markus Swoboda; Austria	48:47.04	Tibor Kiss; Hungary	51:08.55	José Javier Piñeiro; Spain	51:27.98
Men's KL3 (10 km)	Nicolás Martínez; Spain	48:34.29	Serhii Yemelianov; Georgia	49:06.35	Gabin Keirel; France	49:08.29
Men's VL1 (6 km)	Moritz Berthold; Germany	42:52.32	Jakub Szpak; Poland	48:14.01	Only 2 participants	
Men's VL2 (10 km)	Mathieu St-Pierre; Canada	55:00.99	Marius-Bogdan Ciustea; Italy	59:02.06	Shaun Cook; Great Britain	1:02:07.76
Men's VL3 (10 km)	Markus Swoboda; Austria	53:31.78	Javier Reja; Spain	54:13.53	Zakhar Nazarenko; Individual Neutral Athletes	54:34.78
Women's Open (6 km)	Myriam Clavreul; France	34:48.16	Leona Johs; Germany	36:30.62	Jennie Hedren; Sweden	36:32.55
Women's KL1 (6 km)	Jeanette Chippington; Great Britain	35:03.52	Willemijn Raaijmaakers; Netherlands	40:52.57	Lyne Tremblay; Canada	44:50.98
Women's KL2 (6 km)	Anja Adler; Germany	32:29.23	Katalin Varga; Hungary	33:04.75	Agnès Legroux; France	34:32.63
Women's KL3 (6 km)	Katarzyna Kozikowska; Poland	29:22.08	Araceli Menduiña; Spain	29:25.61	Nikoletta Molnár; Hungary	34:03.17
Women's VL1 (6 km)	Lillemor Köper; Germany	45:59.74	Karolina Bronowicz; Poland	54:54.74	Lyne Tremblay; Canada	1:01:42.96
Women's VL2 (6 km)	Jeanette Chippington; Great Britain	37:05.32	Dalma Boldizsar; Hungary	38:38.90	Anna Bilovol; Poland	47:42.76
Women's VL3 (6 km)	Larisa Volik; Individual Neutral Athletes	35:47.01	Nadezhda Andreeva; Individual Neutral Athletes	36:44.11	Monika Kukla; Poland	37:15.52

== Medal table ==
=== Overall ===
* Host nation (Hungary)

Rank	Nation	Gold	Silver	Bronze	Total
1	Hungary*	10	10	7	27
2	Denmark	4	3	1	8
3	Spain	3	3	5	11
4	Portugal	3	1	1	5
5	Austria	2	0	0	2
6	Great Britain	1	1	1	3
6	Poland	1	1	1	3
8	Sweden	1	1	0	2
–	Individual Neutral Athletes	1	0	3	4
9	Czech Republic	1	0	0	1
9	Ireland	1	0	0	1
11	Moldova	0	3	0	3
12	South Africa	0	2	2	4
13	Argentina	0	1	0	1
13	Georgia	0	1	0	1
13	Germany	0	1	0	1
16	France	0	0	3	3
17	Ukraine	0	0	2	2
18	Norway	0	0	1	1
18	Tajikistan	0	0	1	1
Totals (19 entries)		28	28	28	84

Source: Medal Table

=== Overall Canoe Marathon ===
* Host nation (Hungary)

Rank	Nation	Gold	Silver	Bronze	Total
1	Hungary*	10	9	7	26
2	Denmark	3	3	1	7
3	Portugal	3	1	1	5
4	Spain	2	1	4	7
5	Great Britain	1	1	1	3
5	Poland	1	1	1	3
7	Sweden	1	1	0	2
–	Individual Neutral Athletes	1	0	2	3
8	Czech Republic	1	0	0	1
8	Ireland	1	0	0	1
10	Moldova	0	3	0	3
11	South Africa	0	2	2	4
12	Argentina	0	1	0	1
12	Germany	0	1	0	1
14	Ukraine	0	0	2	2
15	France	0	0	1	1
15	Norway	0	0	1	1
15	Tajikistan	0	0	1	1
Totals (17 entries)		24	24	24	72

Source: Medal Table

=== Overall Paracanoe Marathon ===
* Host nation (Hungary)

Rank	Nation	Gold	Silver	Bronze	Total
1	Austria	2	0	0	2
2	Spain	1	2	1	4
3	Denmark	1	0	0	1
4	Georgia	0	1	0	1
4	Hungary*	0	1	0	1
6	France	0	0	2	2
–	Individual Neutral Athletes	0	0	1	1
Totals (6 entries)		4	4	4	12

Source: Medal Table

=== Unofficial (all races) ===
* Host nation (Hungary)

Rank	Nation	Gold	Silver	Bronze	Total
1	Hungary*	11	13	8	32
2	Denmark	4	3	1	8
3	Spain	3	4	5	12
4	Germany	3	2	0	5
5	Great Britain	3	1	2	6
6	Portugal	3	1	1	5
7	Poland	2	3	3	8
8	Individual Neutral Athletes	2	1	3	6
9	Austria	2	0	0	2
10	Sweden	1	1	1	3
11	France	1	0	4	5
12	Canada	1	0	3	4
13	Czech Republic	1	0	0	1
13	Ireland	1	0	0	1
15	Moldova	0	3	0	3
16	South Africa	0	2	2	4
17	Argentina	0	1	0	1
17	Georgia	0	1	0	1
17	Italy	0	1	0	1
17	Netherlands	0	1	0	1
21	Ukraine	0	0	2	2
22	Norway	0	0	1	1
22	Tajikistan	0	0	1	1
Totals (23 entries)		38	38	37	113

Source: Medal Table
