= 2018 ICF Canoe Marathon World Championships =

International canoe competition

- Location: Vila Verde, Portugal
- Dates: 6 to 9 September 2018

The 2018 ICF Canoe Marathon World Championships took place between 6 and 9 September 2018 at Vila Verde, Portugal. The competition consisted of sixteen events – ten in kayak and six in canoe – shared between junior, under-23 and senior categories.

== Medalists ==
=== Seniors ===
Event	Gold	Time	Silver	Time	Bronze	Time
Men's C-1	Manuel Campos (ESP)	2:07:31.32	Manuel Garrido (ESP)	2:07:40.06	Ádám Dóczé (HUN)	2:08:05.54
Men's C-2	Spain (ESP); Diego Romero; Óscar Graña	1:58:31.48	Hungary (HUN); Zoltán Koleszár; Levente Balla	1:58:36.87	Czech Republic (CZE); Jakub Březina; Jan Dlouhy	1:58:59.72
Men's K-1	Andrew Birkett (RSA)	2:09:29.06	Adrián Boros (HUN)	2:09:30.85	Jasper Mocke (RSA)	2:09:33.04
Men's K-2	South Africa (RSA); Andrew Birkett; Hank McGregor	2:02:16.31	Hungary (HUN); Adrián Boros; László Solti	2:02:16.97	Spain (ESP); Miguel Llorens; Luis Amado Pérez	2:02:18.61
Women's C-1	Liudmyla Babak (UKR)	1:24:18.27	Zsófia Kisbán (HUN)	1:26:05.69	Marine Sansinena (FRA)	1:28:42.65
Women's K-1	Vanda Kiszli (HUN)	2:06:16.40	Sára Mihalik (HUN)	2:06:29.31	Eva Barrios (ESP)	2:06:30.84
Women's K-2	Hungary (HUN); Renáta Csay; Zsófia Czéllai-Vörös	1:56:14.05	Spain (ESP); Eva Barrios; Amaia Osaba	1:58:59.37	Spain (ESP); Tania Álvarez; Tania Fernández	1:59:29.22

=== Under 23 ===
Event	Gold	Time	Silver	Time	Bronze	Time
Men's C-1	Sérgio Maciel (POR)	1:51:32.67	Balázs Adolf (HUN)	1:51:37.15	Dániel Laczó (HUN)	1:51:46.01
Men's K-1	Jon Vold (NOR)	1:53:26.37	Marcel Paufler (GER)	1:53:26.93	Nicholas Notten (RSA)	1:53:32.73
Women's K-1	Zsófia Czéllai-Vörös (HUN)	1:48:49.75	Lili Katona (HUN)	1:49:03.65	Samantha Rees-Clark (GBR)	1:51:47.43

=== Juniors ===
Event	Gold	Time	Silver	Time	Bronze	Time
Men's C-1	Dávid Hodován (HUN)	1:40:02.00	Léo Dubois-Dunilac (FRA)	1:40:20.37	Adrian Klos (POL)	1:40:30.68
Men's K-1	Thorbjørn Rask (DEN)	1:39:22.89	Ronan Foley (IRL)	1:40:01.38	Vince Petró (HUN)	1:40:03.29
Men's K-2	Denmark (DEN); Thorbjørn Rask; Nikolai Thomsen	1:35:15.46	Spain (ESP); Luis Alvarez; Oscar Borrego	1:35:29.50	South Africa (RSA); David Evans; Hamish MacKenzie	1:35:30.79
Women's C-1	Marlee MacIntosh (CAN)	1:07:26.82	Adrianna Antos (POL)	1:07:57.44	Mariia Honcharova (UKR)	1:08:19.99
Women's K-1	Zsóka Csikós (HUN)	1:34:39.06	Dorina Fekete (HUN)	1:34:40.26	Emma Russell (GBR)	1:34:47.28
Women's K-2	Hungary (HUN); Olga Bakó; Emese Kőhalmi	1:27:53.20	Hungary (HUN); Zsóka Csikós; Viktória Tófalvi	1:29:32.56	Great Britain (GBR); Emma Russell; Freya Peters	1:31:19.65

== Medal table ==
* Host nation (Portugal)

Rank	Nation	Gold	Silver	Bronze	Total
1	Hungary	6	9	3	18
2	Spain	2	3	3	8
3	South Africa	2	0	3	5
4	Denmark	2	0	0	2
5	Ukraine	1	0	1	2
6	Canada	1	0	0	1
6	Norway	1	0	0	1
6	Portugal*	1	0	0	1
9	France	0	1	1	2
9	Poland	0	1	1	2
11	Germany	0	1	0	1
11	Ireland	0	1	0	1
13	Great Britain	0	0	3	3
14	Czech Republic	0	0	1	1
Totals (14 entries)		16	16	16	48
