= Liudmyla Babak =

Ukrainian sprint and marathon canoer

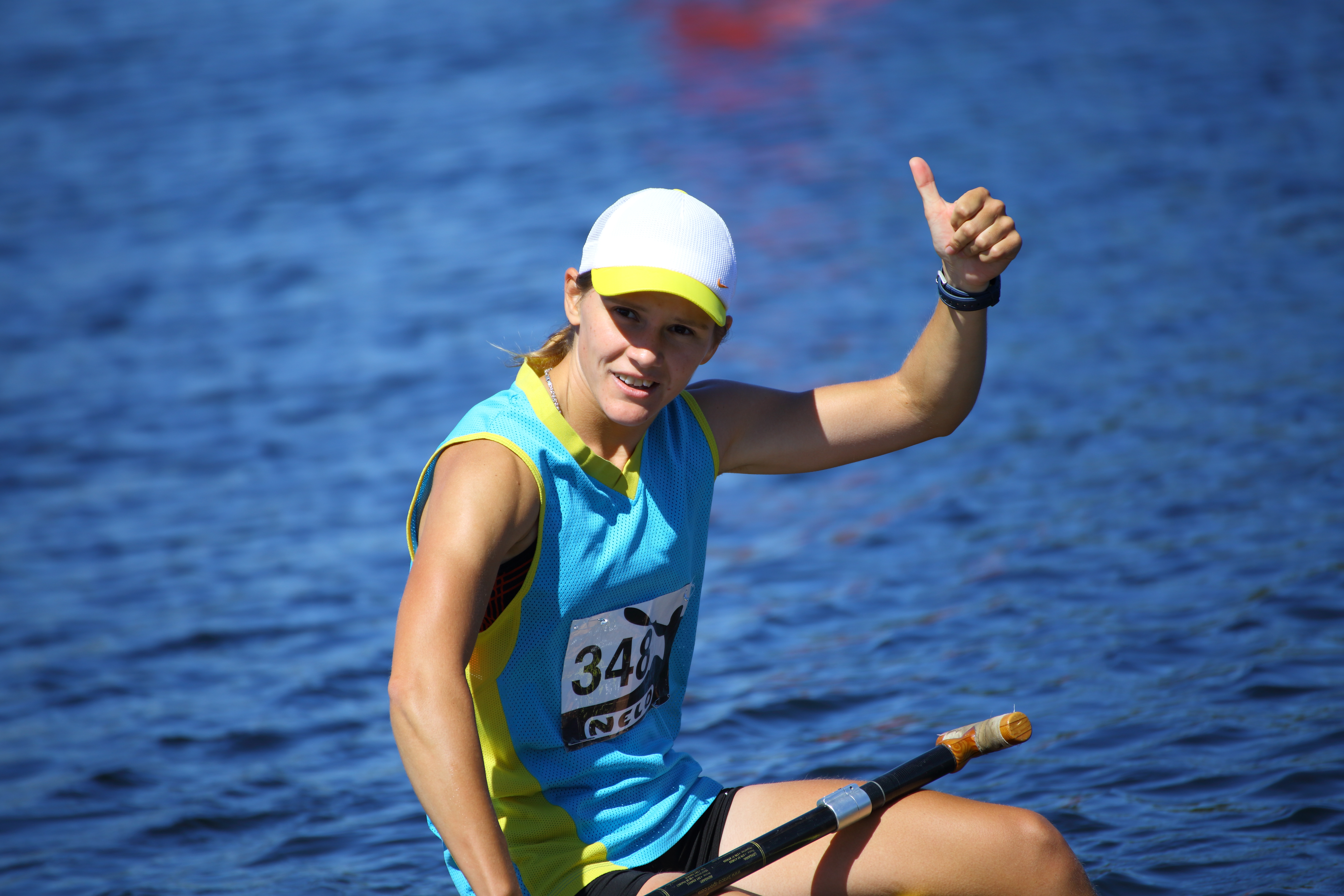
- ECA Canoe Marathon European Championships 2017 - 12

Personal information
- Nationality: Ukrainian
- Born: 1 April 1997 (age 29) Enerhodar, Zaporizhzhia Oblast, Ukraine

Sport
- Country: Ukraine
- Sport: Canoe sprint, canoe marathon
Medal record
Representing Ukraine
Women's canoe sprint
European Championships
Bronze medal – third place	2018 Belgrade	C-1 5000 m
Bronze medal – third place	2021 Poznań	C-1 5000 m
Bronze medal – third place	2022 Munich	C-1 5000 m
Women's canoe marathon
World Championships
Gold medal – first place	2017 Pietermaritzburg	C-1
Gold medal – first place	2018 Vila Verde	C-1
Gold medal – first place	2019 Shaoxing	C-1
Gold medal – first place	2021 Pitești	C-1
Gold medal – first place	2021 Pitești	C-1 short race
Gold medal – first place	2022 Ponte de Lima	C-1
Gold medal – first place	2023 Vejen	C-1
Silver medal – second place	2023 Vejen	C-1 short race
Silver medal – second place	2024 Metković	C-1 short race
Bronze medal – third place	2016 Brandenburg an der Havel	C-1
Bronze medal – third place	2025 Győr	C-1 short race
Bronze medal – third place	2025 Győr	C-1
European Championships
Gold medal – first place	2017 Ponte de Lima	C-1
Gold medal – first place	2018 Metković	C-1
Gold medal – first place	2019 Decize	C-1
Gold medal – first place	2019 Decize	C-1 short race
Gold medal – first place	2022 Silkeborg	C-1
Gold medal – first place	2022 Silkeborg	C-1 short race
Gold medal – first place	2023 Brod	C-1
Gold medal – first place	2023 Brod	C-1 short race
Gold medal – first place	2024 Poznań	C-1
Gold medal – first place	2024 Poznań	C-1 short race
Gold medal – first place	2026 Pitesti	C-1
Silver medal – second place	2026 Pitesti	C-2

Liudmyla Babak (Ukrainian: Людмила Петрівна Бабак; born 1 April 1997 in Enerhodar, Zaporizhzhia Oblast, Ukraine) is a Ukrainian sprint and marathon canoer. She is a three-time bronze medalist of the European Championships, with her first medal coming from the 2018 Europeans.

Babak specialises in canoe marathon competitions. She is the World and European champion.
