= Anna Hemmings =

British kayakist

Anna Hemmings MBE
Personal information
- Born: 19 December 1976 (age 49) Hammersmith, London, England
Medal record
Women's canoe marathon
World Championships
Gold medal – first place	1999 Győr	K-1
Gold medal – first place	2001 Stockton-on-Tees	K-1
Gold medal – first place	2001 Stockton-on-Tees	K-2
Gold medal – first place	2005 Perth	K-1
Gold medal – first place	2006 Tremolat	K-1
Gold medal – first place	2007 Győr	K-1
Silver medal – second place	1996 Vaxholm	K-1
Silver medal – second place	1998 Cape Town	K-1

Anna Lucinda Hemmings MBE (born 19 December 1976) is a British Motivational Speaker and high performance coach, formally a marathon kayaker who competed in the 1990s and 2000s (decade), winning six world championship gold medals, three European Championship gold medals and competing in two Olympic Games (2000 and 2008).

== Career ==
Hemmings, who was born in Hammersmith, also competed in sprint kayaking. She was eliminated in the semifinals of the K-1 500 m event at the 2000 Summer Olympics in Sydney. Eight years later in Beijing, Hemmings was eliminated in the heats of the K-2 500 m event. Hemmings' speciality was endurance racing and she is known as Britain's most successful female marathon kayaker, with 11 World and European Championship medals to her name. She is the only British female kayaker to ever hold World and European marathon kayak titles concurrently (1999 and 2005).

In 2005 Hemmings won the Champions Award at the Sunday Times Sports Woman of the Year Awards. Hemmings was appointed Member of the Order of the British Empire (MBE) in the 2010 New Year Honours. Hemmings graduated from Royal Holloway University of London in 2001 with a BSC degree in Economics and Management and in 2007 the University recognised Anna's achievements and awarded her with an Honorary Fellowship. In recognition of her kayaking achievements, Hemmings was appointed as a member of the World Paddle Awards Academy, an association honoring prominent figures and legends within global paddlesports.

Following her athletic career, Hemmings founded high performance training consultancy Beyond the Barriers and transitioned into leadership and team development, executive coaching and corporate motivational speaking. She is an Associate Certified Coach (ACC) through the International Coaching Federation (ICF). She is also a certified consultant for team performance and leadership development frameworks, including the Five Behaviours of a Cohesive Team and Resilient Leaders Elements. Her work focuses on performance psychology and leadership development within corporate organizations. She has spoken at international corporate conferences and appeared as a guest on business and personal development podcasts, including The Diary of a CEO with Steven Bartlett
