= Diego Piñeiro =

Spanish footballer (born 2004)

Personal information
- Full name: Diego Piñeiro del Álamo
- Date of birth: 13 February 2004 (age 22)
- Place of birth: Madrid, Spain
- Height: 1.85 m (6 ft 1 in)
- Position: Goalkeeper

Team information
- Current team: Murcia
- Number: 13

Youth career
- 2012–2014: Escuela Vicálvaro
- 2014–2022: Real Madrid

Senior career*
Years	Team	Apps	(Gls)
2020–2025	Real Madrid B	8	(0)
2025–	Murcia	7	(0)

International career^{‡}
2021–2022	Spain U18	3	(0)
2022–2023	Spain U19	2	(0)
- * Club domestic league appearances and goals as of 10 June 2026 ‡ National team caps and goals as of 18 January 2023

Diego Piñeiro del Álamo (born 13 February 2004) is a Spanish professional footballer who plays as a goalkeeper for Murcia.

== Early life ==
Piñeiro attended Escuela Vicálvaro in Spain.

== Club career ==
Piñeiro has been involved with La Liga side Real Madrid first team since 2021.

On 21 August 2025, Piñeiro signed with Murcia in Primera Federación.

== International career ==
Piñeiro was awarded Best Goalkeeper at an under-18 international tournament in France.

== Style of play ==
He has been described as "a powerful goalkeeper, with many reflexes, capable of reacting in tenths of seconds to point-blank shots. He also has great positioning".

== Career statistics ==
As of match played 25 May 2025

Appearances and goals by club, season and competition
Club	Season	League			Other		Total	
Club	Season	Division	Apps	Goals	Apps	Goals	Apps	Goals
Real Madrid Castilla	2024–25	Primera Federación	8	0	0	0	8	0
Career total			8	0	0	0	8	0

== Honours ==
Real Madrid

- UEFA Champions League: 2023–24
