= ICF Canoe Marathon World Championships =

International Canoe Federation competition in canoe marathon

ICF Canoe Marathon World Championships is an International Canoe Federation competition in canoe marathon in which athletes compete over long distances. The race usually starts and ends at the same place, and includes portages. Race categories vary by the number of athletes in the boat, the length of the course, and whether the boat is a canoe or kayak. In a kayak, the paddler is seated in the direction of travel, and uses a double-bladed paddle. In a canoe the paddler kneels on one knee with the other leg forward and foot flat on the floor inside the boat, and paddles a single-bladed paddle on one side only. The World Championships were held every two years from 1988, becoming annual in 1998.

== Editions ==
- 1988: Nottingham, United Kingdom
- 1990: Copenhagen, Denmark
- 1992: Brisbane, Australia
- 1994: Amsterdam, Netherlands
- 1996: Vaxholm, Sweden
- 1998: Cape Town, South Africa
- 1999: Győr, Hungary
- 2000: Dartmouth, Canada
- 2001: Stockton-on-Tees, United Kingdom
- 2002: Zamora, Spain
- 2003: Valladolid, Spain
- 2004: Bergen, Norway
- 2005: Perth, Australia
- 2006: Tremolat, France
- 2007: Győr, Hungary
- 2008: Týn nad Vltavou, Czech Republic
- 2009: Gaia, Portugal
- 2010: Banyoles, Spain
- 2011: Singapore
- 2012: Rome, Italy
- 2013: Copenhagen, Denmark
- 2014: Oklahoma City, United States
- 2015: Győr, Hungary
- 2016: Brandenburg an der Havel, Germany
- 2017: Pietermaritzburg, South Africa
- 2018: Vila Verde, Portugal
- 2019: Shaoxing, China
- ~~2020: Bærum, Norway~~ (cancelled due to the COVID-19 pandemic)
- 2021: Pitești, Romania
- 2022: Ponte de Lima, Portugal
- 2023: Vejen, Denmark
- 2024: Metković, Croatia
- 2025: Győr, Hungary
- 2026: Gualeguaychú, Argentina

== Most successful paddlers ==
Top five male and female paddlers with the best medal record are listed below. Boldface denotes active paddlers and the highest number of medals per type, as of the 2025 championships.

=== Men ===
Rank	Athlete	Country	Event(s)	From	To	Gold	Silver	Bronze	Total
1	Edvin Csabai	Hungary	C-1, C-2	1998	2009	**17**	1	0	18
2	Attila Györe	Hungary	C-2	1998	2013	11	2	3	16
3	Hank McGregor	South Africa	K-1, K-2	2003	2018	11	1	0	12
4	**Manuel Campos**	Spain	C-1, C-1 short race, C-2	2012	2024	10	**10**	6	**26**
5	Márton Kövér	Hungary	C-1, C-2	2010	2023	9	5	3	17

=== Women ===
Rank	Athlete	Country	Event(s)	From	To	Gold	Silver	Bronze	Total
1	Renáta Csay	Hungary	K-1, K-2	1999	2022	**20**	**12**	0	**32**
2	**Vanda Kiszli**	Hungary	K-1, K-1 short race, K-2	2017	2025	9	6	3	18
3	**Liudmyla Babak**	Ukraine	C-1, C-1 short race	2016	2025	9	2	3	14
4	Anna Hemmings	Great Britain	K-1, K-2	1996	2007	6	2	0	8
5	**Melina Andersson**	Sweden	K-1, K-1 short race, K-2	2022	2025	5	3	2	10

== Medal table ==
As of 2025 ICF Canoe Marathon World Championships

Rank	Nation	Gold	Silver	Bronze	Total
1	Hungary	78	71	45	194
2	Spain	41	53	40	134
3	Denmark	20	14	10	44
4	Great Britain	17	10	10	37
5	South Africa	15	11	12	38
6	Sweden	11	8	4	23
7	Portugal	11	6	18	35
8	Ukraine	9	4	7	20
9	Australia	6	3	6	15
10	France	4	6	10	20
11	Czech Republic (Note: Including medals as Czechoslovakia.)	3	13	16	32
12	Poland	3	7	15	25
13	Norway	3	0	8	11
14	Italy	2	4	3	9
15	Germany (Note: Including medals as East Germany.)	2	3	7	12
16	Moldova	0	2	0	2
17	Netherlands	0	1	3	4
17	Serbia	0	1	3	4
19	Belarus	0	1	1	2
19	China	0	1	1	2
19	Ireland	0	1	1	2
22	Austria	0	1	0	1
22	Belgium	0	1	0	1
22	Canada	0	1	0	1
22	Croatia	0	1	0	1
22	Slovakia	0	1	0	1
27	Argentina	0	0	3	3
28	Russia (Note: Including medals as the Soviet Union.)	0	0	2	2
29	Bulgaria	0	0	1	1
29	New Zealand	0	0	1	1
Totals (30 entries)		225	225	227	677

== See also ==
- International Canoe Federation
- ICF Canoe Sprint World Championships
- ICF Canoe Slalom World Championships
- ICF Masters Canoe Marathon World Championships
- ICF Canoe Marathon World Cup
- ICF Canoe Marathon Masters World Cup
- Wildwater Canoeing World Championships
