= Canoe Marathon European Championships =

Sporting competition

The Canoe Marathon European Championships is an international canoe marathon event organised by the European Canoe Association. The first edition took place in 1995 and subsequent stagings were held every two years until 2013, after which it became an annual competition.

== Host venues ==
Thirteen editions have been organised in nine countries since the first championships in 1995. As of 2013, the competition has been staged every year.

- 1995: Murcia, Spain
- 1997: Pavia, Italy
- 1999: Gorzów, Poland
- 2001: Győr, Hungary
- 2003: Gdańsk, Poland
- 2005: Týn nad Vltavou, Czech Republic
- 2007: Trenčín, Slovakia
- 2009: Ostróda, Poland
- 2011: Saint-Jean-de-Losne, France
- 2013: Vila Verde, Portugal
- 2014: Piešťany, Slovakia
- 2015: Bohinj, Slovenia
- 2016: Pontevedra, Spain
- 2017: Ponte de Lima, Portugal
- 2018: Metković, Croatia
- 2019: Decize, France
- 2021: Moscow, Russia
- 2022: Silkeborg, Denmark
- 2023: Slavonski Brod, Croatia
- 2024: Poznań, Poland
- 2025: Ponte de Lima, Portugal
- 2026: Pitești, Romania

== Medal table ==
As of 2026 Canoe Marathon European Championships

| Rank | Nation | Gold | Silver | Bronze | Total |
|---|---|---|---|---|---|
| 1 | Hungary | 59 | 52 | 45 | 156 |
| 2 | Spain | 33 | 37 | 43 | 113 |
| 3 | Portugal | 14 | 16 | 11 | 41 |
| 4 | Ukraine | 13 | 4 | 3 | 20 |
| 5 | Poland | 10 | 9 | 12 | 31 |
| 6 | Denmark | 10 | 2 | 7 | 19 |
| 7 | France | 7 | 15 | 9 | 31 |
| 8 | Great Britain | 6 | 10 | 9 | 25 |
| 9 | Norway | 4 | 4 | 4 | 12 |
| 10 | Slovakia | 3 | 1 | 2 | 6 |
| 11 | Netherlands | 2 | 3 | 4 | 9 |
| 12 | Germany | 2 | 3 | 3 | 8 |
| 13 | Italy | 2 | 2 | 3 | 7 |
| 14 | Sweden | 2 | 0 | 1 | 3 |
| 15 | Czech Republic | 1 | 5 | 10 | 16 |
| 16 | Serbia | 1 | 2 | 1 | 4 |
| 17 | Moldova | 1 | 1 | 1 | 3 |
| 18 | Russia | 0 | 3 | 1 | 4 |
| 19 | Croatia | 0 | 1 | 1 | 2 |
| Totals (19 entries) | | 170 | 170 | 170 | 510 |
