= 2024 in aquatic sports =

This article lists the in the water and on the water forms of aquatic sports for 2024.

Page contains information of water sports governing by following sports federations:

- CIPS: Sport fishing
- CMAS: Finswimming, Freediving, Spearfishing, Underwater hockey, Underwater target shooting, Underwater orienteering, Underwater photography
- ICF: Canoe freestyle, Canoe marathon, Canoe ocean racing, Canoe polo, Canoe sailing, Canoe slalom, Canoe sprint, Dragon boat, Stand up paddling, Wildwater canoeing
- ILSF: Lifesaving
- ISA: Surfing
- IWWF: Wakeboarding, Water skiing
- UIM: Powerboating
- World Aquatics: Artistic swimming, Diving, High diving, Open water swimming, Water polo
- World Rowing: Rowing
- World Sailing: Sailing

== World Aquatics Championships ==
- February 2–18: 2024 World Aquatics Championships in (Qatar) Doha
  - (gold) China; (silver) United States; (bronze) Australia
- February 23 – March 3: 2024 World Aquatics Masters Championships in (Qatar) Doha
  - Event cancelled

== Artistic swimming ==
- WA Artistic Swimming Calendar here.

=== World Championships ===
- August 28 – September 1: 2024 World Aquatics Artistic Swimming Junior Championships in (Peru) Lima

=== 2024 World Aquatics Artistic Swimming World Cup ===
- April 5–7: 1st Leg in (China) Beijing
- May 3–5: 2nd Leg in (France) Paris
- May 31 – June 2: 3rd Leg in (Canada) Markham
- July 5–7: Super Final in (Hungary) Budapest

== Canoe freestyle ==
- ICF Events calendar here.

=== Continental Championships ===
- August 26–31: 2024 ECA Canoe Freestyle Senior & Junior European Championships in (Austria) Graz

=== 2024 Canoe Freestyle World Cup ===
- May 26–28: World Cup 1 in (Germany) Plattling
- May 30 – June 1: World Cup 2 in (Germany) Plattling

=== Other Competitions ===
- March 8: Galway Fest in (Republic of Ireland) Tuam
- April 13–14: Open German Championships in (Germany) Plattling
- May 3–4: The Columbus Cup in (United States) Columbus

== Canoe marathon ==
- ICF Events calendar here.

=== World & Continental Championships ===
- July 25–28: 2024 ECA Canoe Marathon European Championships in (Poland) Poznań
- September 16–17: 2024 ICF Masters Canoe Marathon World Championships in (Croatia) Metković
- September 19–22: 2024 ICF Canoe Marathon World Championships in (Croatia) Metković

=== 2024 Canoe Marathon World Cup ===
- June 1–2: 2024 CMWC in (Germany) Brandenburg

=== Other Competitions ===
- April 13–14: Rheine Marathon Open German Champs Shortdistance in (Germany) Rheine
- April 20: 50th Amsterdam Waterland Marathon in (Netherlands) Amsterdam
- April 20–21: Võhandu Marathon in (Estonia) Võru
- May 5: Padova Water Marathon in (Italy) Padova
- May 10–12: Open German Champs Longdistance in (Germany) Cottbus
- May 11: 63rd Liffey Descent in (Republic of Ireland) Kildare
- June 15–26: 62nd Descens Internacional del Xúquer in Spain
- June 21–23: 41st Budějovice-Praha in Czech Republic
- July 6: 30th Baixada Internacional do Río Umia in (Spain) Ribadumia
- August 3: 86th Descenso Internacional del Sella in (Spain) Asturias
- August 25: 25th Descenso Internacional del Cinca in (Spain) Mequinenza
- September 14: 56th Descenso Internacional del Río Sil in (Spain) O Barco de Valdeorras
- October 5–6: 54th International Canoe Marathon Vigevano - Pavia in (Italy) Pavia
- October 11–13: 2024 ICF Canoe Marathon Super Cup Hangzhou in (China) Hangzhou
- October 12–13: 21. Neumünster Marathon in (Germany) Neumünster
- October 20: Adigemarathon in (Italy) Verona
- October 26: Turin Kayak Canoe Marathon in (Italy) Torio

== Canoe ocean racing ==
- ICF Events calendar here.

=== World & Continental Championships ===
- April 12–14: 2024 ECA Ocean Racing European Championships in (Portugal) Azores
- October 4–6: 2024 ICF Canoe Ocean Racing World Championships in (Portugal) Madeira

=== Other Competitions ===
- April 26–28: XV Eurochallenge 2024 in (Spain) Villajoyosa
- May 16–19: Naxos Cup in (Italy) Giardini Naxos
- May 24–26: 4. Baltic Sea Festival in (Germany) Eckernförde
- June 27–30: Hawaiian Sports Festival in (Germany) Rerik
- July 28: V Trofeo Internacional da Coruña de Kayak de Mar in (Spain) A Coruña
- August 22–25: Pahang Ocean Festival in (Malaysia) Pahang
- September 13–15: Allwave Cup 2024 in (Italy) Orbetello
- September 15: Trofeo Internacional de Kayak de Mar Concello de Vigo in (Spain) Vigo
- September 28–29: Forza Paris Cup in (Italy) Cagliari
- October 18–20: Tigullio Ocean Racing Challenge in (Italy) Sestri Levante

== Canoe sailing ==
=== World Championships ===
- July 20–27: 2024 ICF Canoe Sailing World Championships in (Germany) Travemünde

== Canoe slalom ==
- ICF Events calendar here.

=== Olympic Games ===
- July 27 – August 5: 2024 Summer Olympics in (France) Paris

=== World & Continental Championships ===
- January 26–28: 2024 Oceania Canoe Slalom Championships in (Australia) Penrith
  - K1 winners: (Czech Republic) Jiří Prskavec (m) / (Australia) Jessica Fox (w)
  - C1 winners: (Czech Republic) Lukáš Rohan (m) / (Australia) Jessica Fox (w)
  - Kayak Cross: (France) Mathurin Madore (m) / (Australia) Jessica Fox (w)
- March 8–10: 2024 Asian Canoe Slalom Championships in (Thailand) Pattaya
- March 15–17: 2024 Pan American Canoe Slalom Championships in (Brazil) Rio de Janeiro
  - K1 winners: (Brazil) Pepe Gonçalves (m) / (Mexico) Sofía Reinoso (w)
  - C1 winners: (Canada) Alex Baldoni (m) / (Canada) Lois Betteridge (w)
  - K1 u23 winners: (United States) Joshua Joseph (m) / (Brazil) Daniela Sofia (w)
  - C1 u23 winners: (Argentina) Manuel Tripano (m) / (Argentina) Nerea Castiglione (w)
  - K1 junior winners: (Canada) Isaac Zimmerman (m) / (Argentina) Nerea Castiglione (w)
  - C1 junior winners: (Slovakia) Dominik Egyhazy (m)
- May 16–19: 2024 European Canoe Slalom Championships in (Slovenia) Tacen
- July 2–7: 2024 World Junior and U23 Canoe Slalom Championships in (Slovakia) Liptovský Mikuláš
- August 15–18: 2024 European Junior and U23 Canoe Slalom Championships in (Poland) Kraków
- August 24–25: 2024 ICF Masters Canoe Slalom World Championships in (Poland) Kraków

=== 2024 Canoe Slalom World Cup ===
- May 30 – June 2: CSWC #1 in (Germany) Augsburg
- June 6–9: CSWC #2 in (Czech Republic) Prague
- June 13–16: CSWC #3 in (Poland) Kraków
- September 12–15: CSWC #4 in (Italy) Ivrea
- September 19–22 CSWC #5 (final) in (Spain) La Seu d'Urgell

=== World Ranking Competitions ===
- February 2–4: 2024 Australian Open in (Australia) Penrith
  - K1 winners: (Australia) Lucien Delfour (m) / (Netherlands) Martina Wegman (w)
  - C1 winners: (Australia) Tristan Carter (m) / (Australia) Jessica Fox (w)
  - Kayak Cross: (Australia) Timothy Anderson (m) / (France) Marjorie Delassus (w)
- February 9–11: 2024 New Zealand Open in Auckland
  - K1 winners: (New Zealand) Finn Butcher (m) / (France) Camille Prigent (w)
  - C1 winners: (New Zealand) Oliver Puchner (m) / (France) Marjorie Delassus (w)
  - Kayak Cross: (New Zealand) Finn Butcher (m) / (New Zealand) Luuka Jones (w)
- February 9–11: 2024 World Ranking Competition & 2024 African Canoe Slalom Olympic Qualifiers in (Réunion) Sainte-Suzanne
  - K1 winners: (Italy) Gelindo Chiarello (m) / (Germany) Ricarda Funk (w)
  - C1 winners: (France) Yohann Senechault (m) / (Germany) Elena Lilik (w)
- March 9–10: Pyrenees Cup La Seu 2024 in (Spain) La Seu d'Urgell
  - K1 winners: (Spain) Pau Echaniz (m) / (Spain) Laia Sorribes (w)
  - C1 winners: (Spain) Miquel Travé (m) / (Spain) Núria Vilarrubla (w)
  - Kayak Cross: (United Kingdom) Sam Leaver (m) / (Andorra) Mònica Dòria (w)
- March 16–17: Pyrenees Cup Pau 2024 in (Spain) Pau
  - K1 winners: (France) Anatole Delassus (m) / (France) Emma Vuitton (w)
  - C1 winners: (France) Mewen Debliquy (m) / (United Kingdom) Mallory Franklin (w)
- March 23–24: ICF World ranking Huningue 2024 in (France) Huningue
  - K1 winners: (Switzerland) Jan Rohrer (m) / (Germany) Ricarda Funk (w)
  - C1 winners: (Czech Republic) Václav Chaloupka (m) / (Germany) Elena Lilik (w)
- March 23–24: ICF World ranking Solkan 2024 in (Slovenia) Solkan
  - K1 winners: (Slovenia) Tine Kancler (m) / (Slovenia) Eva Alina Hočevar (w)
  - C1 winners: (Slovenia) Luka Božič (m) / (Italy) Marta Bertoncelli (w)
- April 20–21: ECA Open - Tacen Open in (Slovenia) Tacen
  - K1 winners: (Slovenia) Lan Tominc (m) / (Slovenia) Eva Terčelj (w)
  - C1 winners: (Slovenia) Ziga Lin Hočevar (m) / (Italy) Elena Borghi (w)
- May 3–5: 3rd Memorial of Stefan Kaplaniak in (Poland) Kraków
  - K1 winners: (Poland) Mateusz Polaczyk (m) / (Poland) Klaudia Zwolińska (w)
  - C1 winners: (Poland) Kacper Sztuba (m) / (Poland) Klaudia Zwolińska (w)
- May 25–26: 76th Tatra International in (Slovakia) Liptovský Mikuláš
- May 25–26: ECA Cup - Merano Open in (Italy) Merano
- August 2–4: ICF World ranking Prague 2024 in (Czech Republic) Prague

=== Olympic Games Qualification Events ===
- February 9–11: 2024 African Canoe Slalom Olympic Qualifiers in (Réunion) Sainte-Suzanne
  - Quota winners: K1 winners: Tunisia (m) / — (w), C1 winners: Senegal (m) / — (w)
- March 15–17: 2024 Pan American Canoe Slalom Olympic Qualifiers in Rio de Janeiro
  - Quota winners: K1 winners: Brazil (m) / Mexico (w), C1 winners: Canada (m) / Canada (w)
- June 7–9: 2024 ICF Kayak Cross Global Qualification Tournament in (Czech Republic) Prague

=== Other Competitions ===
- April 6–7: 55th Ilinden Kayak Slalom IKAS 2024 in (North Macedonia) Skopje
- April 20–21: Canoe Slalom International Race in (Italy) Ivrea
- May 4–5: ECA Open in TBD
- June 1–2: ECA Junior Cup in (Italy) Valstagna
- June 8–9: ECA Junior Cup in (Italy) Ivrea
- October 11–13: ICF Canoe Slalom Super Cup Hangzhou in (China) Hangzhou
- October 12–13: Segre Cup in (Spain) La Seu d'Urgell
- October 13: 2024 Canoe Slalom Alpe Adria in (Austria) Klagenfurt

== Canoe sprint ==
- ICF Events calendar here.

=== Olympic Games ===
- August 6–11: 2024 Summer Olympics in (France) Paris

=== World & Continental Championships ===
- February 16–18: 2024 Oceanian Canoe Sprint Championships in (Australia) Penrith
  - Open winners
  - K1 200 m: (Australia) F White (m) / (Singapore) Stephenie Chen (w)
  - K1 500 m: (Australia) Jean van der Westhuyzen (m) / (New Zealand) Aimee Fisher (w)
  - K1 1000 m: (Australia) Thomas Green (m) / (New Zealand) Emma Kemp (w)
  - K2 200 m: (Australia) B Clues & (Australia) H Taurins (m)
  - K2 500 m: (Australia) Jean van der Westhuyzen & (Australia) Thomas Green (m) / (New Zealand) Aimee Fisher & (w) (New Zealand) Danielle McKenzie (w)
  - K4 500 m: (Australia) Riley Fitzsimmons, (Australia) Jean van der Westhuyzen, (Australia) Jackson Collins & (Australia) Noah Havard (m)
    (Australia) Ella Beere, (Australia) Alyssa Bull, (Australia) Alexandra Clarke & (Australia) Yale Steinepreis (w)
  - C1 200 m: (Australia) Josephine Bulmer (w)
  - C1 500 m: (Australia) K Moesbergen (w)
  - C1 1000 m: (Australia) Benjamin Manning (m)
  - C2 200 m: (Australia) E Kernaghan & (w) (Australia) E Bruce (w)
  - C2 500 m: (New Zealand) James Munro & (New Zealand) K Ngataki (m) / (Australia) E Kernaghan & (Australia) E Bruce (w)
- April 18–21: 2024 ACC Canoe Sprint Asian Championships in (Japan) Tokyo
  - Open winners
  - K1 200 m: (South Korea) Cho Gwang-hee (m) / (Kazakhstan) Tatyana Tokarnistkaya (w)
  - K1 500 m: (m) / (China) Zhang Luxi (w)
  - K1 1000 m: (Uzbekistan) Shakhriyor Makhkamov (m)
  - K2 500 m: (Kazakhstan) Bekarys Ramatulla & (Kazakhstan) Sergii Tokarnytskyi (m) / (China) Yu Shimeng & (w) (China) Chen Yule (w)
  - C1 200 m: (Kazakhstan) Viktor Stepanov (m) / (Uzbekistan) Nilufar Zokirova (w)
  - C1 500 m: (Vietnam) Diệp Thị Hường (w)
  - C1 1000 m: (Iran) Mohammad Nabi Rezaei (m)
  - C2 500 m: (Kazakhstan) Sergey Yemelyanov & (Kazakhstan) Timur Khaidarov (m) / (Kazakhstan) Mariya Brovkova & (Kazakhstan) Rufina Iskakova (w)
- April 23–25: 2024 COPAC Canoe Sprint Pan American Championships in (United States) Sarasota
- June 13–16: 2024 ECA Canoe Sprint European Championships in (Hungary) Szeged
- June 27–30: 2024 ECA European Junior and U23 Canoe Sprint Championships in (Slovakia) Bratislava
- July 12–14: 2024 ICF Masters Canoe Sprint World Championships in (Bulgaria) Plovdiv
- July 17–21: 2024 ICF World Junior and U23 Canoe Sprint Championships in (Bulgaria) Plovdiv
- August 23–25: 2024 Canoe Sprint World Championships in (Uzbekistan) Samarkand

=== 2024 Canoe Sprint World Cup ===
- May 10–12: CSWC #1 in (Hungary) Szeged
- May 24–26: CSWC #2 in (Poland) Poznań

=== Canoe Sprint Olympic Qualifiers ===
- February 16–18: 2024 Oceanian Canoe Sprint Olympic Qualifiers in (Australia) Penrith
- April 18–21: 2024 Asian Canoe Sprint Olympic Qualifiers in (Japan) Tokyo
- April 23–25: 2024 Pan American Canoe Sprint Olympic Qualifiers in (United States) Sarasota
- May 8–9: 2024 European Canoe Sprint Qualifier in (Hungary) Szeged

=== Other Events ===
- April 6–7: International Race Milan in (Italy) Milan
- May 3–5: Grosse Brandenburger Kanu Regatta in (Germany) Brandenburg an der Havel
- May 4: Regata De Eurorrexion Sprint in (Spain) Pontevedra
- June 21–23: Auronzo International Canoe Sprint in (Italy) Auronzo di Cadore
- July 6–7: Open International Race Weitenegg in (Germany) Weitenegg
- July 6: Regata International De Sanabria " Sanabria 2024" in (Spain) Lago de Sanabria
- July 7: Gran Premio Internacional K4 De Cyl. Trofeo Ciudad de Valladolid in (Spain) Valladolid
- September 5–8: 2024 Canoe Sprint Olympic Hopes Regatta in (Hungary) Sukoró
- September 28–29: 44th Troffeo Medaglia D'Argento Presidente Della Repubblica in (Italy) Savona
- September 28–29: Sprint Cup Sarcidano Race in (Italy) Isili
- October 6: Grand Fondo Lago Di Puccini in (Italy) Viareggio
- October 11–13: 2024 ICF Canoe Sprint Super Cup Hangzhou in (China) Hangzhou

== Canoe polo ==
- ICF Events calendar here.

=== World Championships ===
- October 15–20: 2024 ICF Canoe Polo World Championships in (China) Deqing

=== Other tournaments ===
- July 12–14: 33° Franco Baschirotto Memorial 2024 in (Italy) Castello di Porpetto
- August 10–11: International Tournament De Paddel in (Belgium) Dikkebus
- August 30 – September 1: 18° Fraser's Hill International Canoe Polo in (Malaysia) Pahang
- September 20–22: XII Trofeo Ponterosso in (Italy) Trieste
- October 11–13: 2024 ICF Canoe Polo Super Cup Hangzhou in (China) Hangzhou
- October 26–27: Trofeo Sarparella in (Italy) Bacoli

== Diving ==
- WA Diving Calendar here.

=== 2024 World Aquatics Diving World Cup ===
- February 29 – March 3: Stop 1 in (Canada) Montreal
  - Women's 3m springboard winner: (China) Chen Yiwen
  - Women's 10m platform winner: (China) Chen Yuxi
  - Women's 3m synchronised winners: (China) Chen Yiwen & (China) Chang Yani
  - Women's 10m synchronised winners: (China) Quan Hongchan & (China) Chen Yuxi
  - Men's 3m springboard winner: (China) Wang Zongyuan
  - Men's 10m platform winner: (China) Yang Hao
  - Men's 3m synchronised winners: (China) Long Daoyi & (China) Wang Zongyuan
  - Men's 10m synchronised winners: (China) Lian Junjie & (China) Yang Hao
  - Mixed 3m & 10m Team winners: China
- March 21–24: Stop 2 in (Germany) Berlin
  - Women's 3m springboard winner: (China) Chen Yiwen
  - Women's 10m platform winner: (China) Quan Hongchan
  - Women's 3m synchronised winners: (United States) Sarah Bacon & (United States) Kassidy Cook
  - Women's 10m synchronised winners: (United States) Delaney Schnell & (United States) Jessica Parratto
  - Men's 3m springboard winner: (China) Wang Zongyuan
  - Men's 10m platform winner: (China) Lian Junjie
  - Men's 3m synchronised winners: (United Kingdom) Anthony Harding & (United Kingdom) Jack Laugher
  - Men's 10m synchronised winners: (United Kingdom) Tom Daley & (United Kingdom) Noah Williams
  - Mixed 3m & 10m Team winners: United Kingdom
- April 19–21: Super Final in Xi'an
  - Women's 3m springboard winner: (China) Chen Yiwen
  - Women's 10m platform winner: (China) Chen Yuxi
  - Women's 3m synchronised winners: (Australia) Anabelle Smith & (Australia) Maddison Keeney
  - Women's 10m synchronised winners: (China) Quan Hongchan & (China) Chen Yuxi
  - Men's 3m springboard winner: (China) Wang Zongyuan
  - Men's 10m platform winner: (China) Yang Hao
  - Men's 3m synchronised winners: (China) Long Daoyi & (China) Wang Zongyuan
  - Men's 10m synchronised winners: (China) Yang Hao & (China) Lian Junjie
  - Mixed 3m & 10m Team winners: China

== Dragon boat ==
- ICF Events calendar here.

=== World Championships ===
- October 28 – November 4: 2024 ICF Dragon Boat World Championships in (Philippines) Puerto Princesa

=== World Cup ===
- October 23–27: World Cup in (China) Yichang

=== Other Events ===
- March 10: Dragon Boat Woman Festival in (Italy) Toscolano Maderno
- November 10: St. Martins Summer Dragonboat Festival in (Italy) Toscolano Maderno

== Finswimming ==
- CMAS Finswimming Calendar here.

=== World & Continental Championships ===
- April 26–27: 2024 FISU University World Championship Finswimming in (Colombia) Pereira
- June 25 – July 1: 2024 Finswimming Junior European Championships in (Lithuania) Klaipėda
- July 9–12: CMAS 4th Finswimming World Masters Championships in (Serbia) Belgrade
- July 10–17: 2024 Finswimming World Championships in (Serbia) Belgrade
- September 21–24: 5th CMAS Finswimming Open Water World Masters Championship in (France) Carry-le-Rouet
- September 23–28: 22nd CMAS Finswimming Open Water World Seniors Championship in (France) Carry-le-Rouet
- September 23–28: 19th CMAS Finswimming Open Water World Juniors Championships in (France) Carry-le-Rouet
- November 14–18: 2nd CMAS World Para Finswimming Championship in (Italy) Lignano Sabbiadoro

=== 2024 CMAS Finswimming World Cup ===
- February 23–25: WC #1 in (France) Aix-en-Provence
- March 21–24: WC #2 in (Italy) Lignano Sabbiadoro
- April 12–14: WC #3 in (United States) Coral Springs
- September 6–8: WC #4 in (Thailand) Phuket
- October 4–6: WC #5 in (Colombia) Barranquilla
- October 18–20: WC Golden Final in (Italy) Lignano Sabbiadoro

== Freediving ==
- CMAS Freediving Calendar here.

=== World Championships ===
- July 4–10: 2024 CMAS World Freediving Indoor Championship in (Serbia) Belgrade
- July 4–10: 2024 CMAS World Freediving Indoor Masters Championship in (Serbia) Belgrade
- October 2–13: 2024 CMAS Freediving Depth World Championship in (Greece) Kalamata
- October 2–13: 2024 CMAS Master Freediving Depth World Championship in (Greece) Kalamata

=== 2024 Freediving World Cup ===
- April 27–29: CMAS World Cup Pool Series - Apnea Games 2024 in (Greece) Athens
- May 2–4: CMAS World Cup Pool Series - Poland 2024 in Łódź
- May 14–20: CMAS World Cup Depth Series - Philippines Freediving 2024 in Philippines
- August 7–14: CMAS World Cup Depth Series - Roatán in (Honduras) Roatán
- September 2–9: CMAS World Cup Depth Series - Authentic Big Blue 2024 in (Greece) Mytikas

=== Other Events ===
- March 16–17: 5th Round, French Apnea National Cup (STA, DYN, DNF & 8X50m) in (France) Besançon
- April 17–23: National Events Open Camotes Freediving Challenge in Philippines
- June 28–29: 11th French Apnea outdoor Championship (CWT, CWT-BF, CNF and FIM) in (France) Villefranche-sur-Mer
- July 26 – August 4: Deep Dominica Depth Competition July 2024 in Dominica
- November 23 – December 2: Deep Dominica Depth Competition November 2024 in Dominica

== High diving ==
- WA High Diving Calendar here.

=== World Championships ===
- February 13–15: 2024 World Aquatics Championships in (Qatar) Doha
  - Winners: (United Kingdom) Aidan Heslop (m) / (Australia) Rhiannan Iffland (w)

=== 2024 Red Bull Cliff Diving World Series ===
- TBD: WS#1 in TBD
- TBD: WS#2 in TBD
- TBD: WS#3 in TBD
- TBD: WS#4 in TBD
- TBD: WS#5 in TBD
- TBD: WS#6 in TBD
- TBD: WS#7 in TBD
- TBD: WS#8 in TBD

== Lifesaving ==
- ILSF Events calendar here and here.

=== World & Continental Championships ===
- June 28 – July 5: 2024 European Youth Lifesaving Championships in Germany
- August 20 – September 8: 2024 Lifesaving World Championships in (Australia) Gold Coast

=== Other ILSF Events ===
- January 18–20: Australian Pool Lifesaving Championships 2024 in Australia
- January 27–28: SLSA Wales Stillwaters in United Kingdom
- January 30 – February 4: Italian Championships Open 2024 in Italy
- February 17–18: National Stillwater Championships 2024 in Ireland
- March 2–3: IV Spanish Short Course Championships in Spain
- March 9–10: Dordrecht Lifesaver Summit in (Netherlands) Dordrecht
- March 23–24: RLSS UK National Speeds Championships 2024 in United Kingdom
- March 20–27: DHL South African Lifesaving Championships in South Africa
- March 30 – April 1: Championnats de France Eau Plate Nationale 1 in France
- April 12–14: 5th Open German Championships in (Germany) Düsseldorf
- April 20–21: Championnats de France Eau Plate Masters in Toulouse
- April 21: MISP' 24 - International Pool Lifesaving Meeting in (Belgium) Seraing
- May 3–5: XII Spanish International Open May 2024 in Spain
- May 17–24: French Rescue 2024 in (France) Montpellier
- November 22–23: International German Cup in Germany
- November 29 – December 1: Orange Cup in Netherlands
- December 6–8: Polish Cup – International Polish Winter Lifesaving Championships in (Poland) Warsaw

== Open water swimming ==
- WA Open Water Swimming Calendar here.

=== World Championships ===
- September 6–8: 2024 World Aquatics Open Water Swimming Junior World Championships in (Italy) Alghero

=== 2024 World Aquatics Open Water Swimming World Cup ===
- March 23–24: Stop 1 in (Egypt) Soma Bay
  - 10 km winners: (Italy) Domenico Acerenza (m) / (Germany) Leonie Beck (w)
  - Mixed 4 x 1500 winners: France
- May 25–26: Stop 2 in (Italy) Golfo Aranci
- June 1–2: Stop 3 in (Portugal) Setubal
- October 26–27: Stop 4 in Hong Kong
- December TBC: Stop 5 in (Israel) Eilat

== Powerboating ==
- UIM Calendar here.
- E1 Series website here

=== 2024 Formula 1 Powerboat World Championship ===
- March 1–3: Pertamina GP of Indonesia in Balige
  - Winner: (United Arab Emirates) Rusty Wyatt
- March 29–31: GP of Binh Dinh in (Vietnam) Quy Nhon
  - Winner: (Sweden) Erik Stark
- June 14–16: GP of Italy in Olbia
  - Winner: (United Arab Emirates) Rusty Wyatt
- October 4–6: GP of China 1 in Shanghai
- October: Asia in TBD
- December 6–8: Road to Sharjah - GP of Sharjah in (United Arab Emirates) Sharjah

=== 2024 MotoSurf World Championships ===
- April 18–20: WC #1 in (United Arab Emirates) Fujairah
- May 31 – June 2: WC #2 in (Poland) Osiek
- August 6–8: WC #3 in (Sweden) Bastad
- September 6–8: WC #4 in (Italy) Rodi Garganico
- October 11–13: WC #5 in Europe
- November 15–17: WC #6 in China
- November 24–26: WC #7 - The World Games Qualification Race in China

=== 2024 UIM E1 World Championships ===
- January 2–3: WC #1 in (Saudi Arabia) Jeddah
  - Winner: Team Brady ( (Finland) Emma Kimiläinen, (United Kingdom) Sam Coleman)
- May 11–12: WC #2 in (Italy) Venice
  - Winner: Team Brady ( (Finland) Emma Kimiläinen, (United Kingdom) Sam Coleman)
- June 1–2: WC #3 in (Spain) Puerto Banús
  - Winner: Team Miami powered by Magnus ( (United States) Anna Glennon, (Sweden) Erik Stark)
- July 26–27: WC #4 in Monaco
  - Winner: Team Brady ( (Finland) Emma Kimiläinen, (United Kingdom) Sam Coleman)
- August 23–24: WC #5 in (Italy) Lake Como
- November 9–10: WC #6 in Hong Kong

=== 2024 Aquabike World Championship ===
- March 22–24: GP of Binh Dinh in (Vietnam) Quy Nhon
  - Runabout GP1 winner: (Sweden) Samuel Johansson
  - Ski Division GP1 winner: (Belgium) Quinten Bossche
  - Ski Ladies GP1 winner: (Estonia) Jasmiin Üpraus
  - Freestyle winner: (United Arab Emirates) Rashid Al Mulla
- June 21–23: Regione Sardegna GP of Italy in Olbia
- July 19: GP of Hungary in Gyor
- November 16–17: GP of Lake Toba in (Indonesia) Balige

== Rowing ==
- World Rowing calendar here.

=== World & Continental Championships ===
- February 23–24: 2024 World Rowing Indoor Championships & 2024 European Rowing Indoor Championships in (Czech Republic) Prague
- April 25–28: 2024 European Rowing Championships in (Hungary) Szeged
- August 18–25: 2024 World Rowing Championships in (Canada) St. Catharines
- September 6–8: 2024 World Rowing Coastal Championships in (Italy) Genoa
- September 13–15: 2024 World Rowing Beach Sprint Finals in (Italy) Genoa

=== 2024 World Rowing Cup ===
- April 12–14: WC #1 in (Italy) Varese
- May 24–26: WC #2 in (Switzerland) Lucerne
- June 14–16: WC #3 in (Poland) Poznań

=== Other Regattas ===
- February 10–11: Torino International Winter Regatta in (Italy) Turin
  - Results: Day 1, Day 2
- February 17: Croatia Indoor Regatta - Rijeka in Rijeka
  - Results: here
- March 6–10: World Rowing Virtual Indoor Sprints
- March 16: International Budapest Cup Regatta in (Hungary) Budapest

== Sailing ==
=== Sailing World Championships ===
- December 27, 2023 – January 3: 2024 IWCA World Championship in (Australia) Perth
  - Winners: (Australia) Lars Kleppich (m) / (United States) Lanee Beashel (w)
- January 2–9: 2024 Tasar World Championship in (Australia) Sandringham Yacht Club
  - Winners: (United States) Jonathan McKee & Libby McKee
- January 3–10: 2024 420 World Championships in (Brazil) Rio de Janeiro
  - Winners: (Brazil) Lucas Cocchi Kubelka De Freitas & Victoria Back (men/mixed)
- January 3–10: 2024 ILCA 6 Women's World Championships in (Argentina) Buenos Aires
  - Winner: (Denmark) Anne-Marie Rindom
- January 24–31: 2024 ILCA 7 World Championship in (Australia) Adelaide
  - Winner: (Australia) Matthew Wearn
- January 26 – February 3: 2024 iQFoil World Championships in (Spain) Lanzarote
  - Winners: (Italy) Nicolò Renna (m) / (Israel) Sharon Kantor (w)
- February 2–10: 2024 ILCA 6 and 7 Masters World Championships in (Australia) Adelaide
  - For Full Results here.
- February 5–16: 2024 Fireball World Championship in (Australia) Royal Geelong Yacht Club
  - Winners: (United Kingdom) Thomas Gillard & (United Kingdom) Andy Thompson
- February 11–16: 2024 SB20 World Championships in (United Arab Emirates) Dubai
  - Winners: (United Arab Emirates) Artem Basalkin & (United Arab Emirates) Pippa Wilson & (United Arab Emirates) Gonçalo Lopes
- February 24 – March 2: 2024 OK Dinghy World Championship in (Australia) Brisbane
  - Winners: (United Kingdom) Nick Craig
- February 24 – March 3: 2024 470 World Championships in (Spain) Palma de Majorca
  - Winners: (Spain) Jordi Xammar & (Spain) Nora Brugman
- March 4–10: 2024 49er & 49er FX World Championships in (Spain) Lanzarote
  - 49er winners: (France) Erwan Fischer & (France) Clément Pequin
  - 49er FX winners: (Netherlands) Odile van Aanholt & (Netherlands) Annette Duetz
- March 15–22: 2024 Etchells World Championship in (Australia) Perth
- March 23–31: 2024 Flying Dutchman World Championship in (United States) St. Petersburg
- April 21–30: 2024 ISWC Speed Windsurfing World Championship in (France) Marseille

== Spearfishing ==
- Spearfishing calendar here.

=== CMAS International Competitions ===
- January 25–27: Semana Master de Pesca Submarina in (Spain) Palma de Mallorca
- March 6–9: 2nd CMAS Spearfishing World Cup of Clubs in (Brazil) Rio de Janeiro
- May 29 – June 2: XXXIV Men & III Women CMAS Spearfishing Euro-African Championships in (Turkey) Erdek
- October 10–13: CMAS IX Panamerican Championships Spearfishing in (Chile) Antofagasta

== Sport fishing ==
- CIPS Website here

=== Fly fishing ===
==== World Championships ====
- May 19–25: 2024 FIPS Mouche Ladies & Masters World Fly Fishing Championship in (Czech Republic) Vyšší Brod
- June 23–30: 2024 FIPS Mouche World Fly Fishing Championship in (France) Font-Romeu
- August 11–18: 2024 FIPS Mouche Youth World Fly Fishing Championship in (Czech Republic) Vyšší Brod

==== Continental Championships ====
- August 27 – September 2: 2024 FIPS Mouche European Fly Fishing Championship in (Poland) Lesko

=== Freshwater fishing ===
==== World Championships ====
- March 6–10: 20th Ice Fishing World Championships in (Mongolia) Ögii Lake
  - Results:
- April 6–7: 30th Trout with Natural Baits Nations and Clubs World Championships in (Italy) Solano
- May 4–5: 13th Feeder Nations World Championships in (Spain) Mérida
- May 17–18: 21st Predators A.B. Shore World Championships in (Bosnia and Herzegovina) Kiseljak
- June 1–2: 7th Feeder Clubs World Championships in (Portugal) Odivelas Dam
- June 14–15: Coarse Angling 16th Veterans, 6th Masters & 25th Disabled World Championships in (Bulgaria) Plovdiv
- July 10–13: 4th Carp Women & 1st Carp u22 World Championships in (Latvia) Balote lake
- July 27–28: 43rd Coarse Angling Clubs World Championships in (Slovenia) Brežice
- August 9–10: Coarse Angling 28th u15, 37th u20 & 16th u25 World Championships in (Serbia) Bela Crkva
- August 24–25: 30th Coarse Angling Woman World Championships in (Portugal) Penacova
- September 4–7: 24th Carp Seniors World Championships in (Croatia) Našice
- September 13–14: 4th Feeder Free Style Method World Championships in (Bulgaria) Plovdiv
- September 12–14: 3rd Predators A.B. Kayak World Championships in (Italy) Bracciano Lake
- September 21–22: 70th Coarse Angling Nations World Championships in (France) Bethune
- October 3–5: 15th Predators A.B. Boats World Championships in (Republic of Ireland) Lough Erne
- October 4–5: 3rd Feeder Master & 1st Feeder u25 World Championships in (Hungary) Szeged
- October 17–19: 18th Black-pass World Championships in (Italy) Bolsena Lake
- October 26–27: 3rd Street fishing World Championships in (Italy) Peschiera del Garda
- November 15–16: 4th Trout area World Championships in (Bulgaria) Kapinovo

==== Continental Championships ====
- June 29–30: 28th Coarse Angling Europe Championships in (Netherlands) Prinses Margriet Canal

=== Sea fishing ===
==== World Championships ====
- April 6–13: 16th World Boat Angling Clubs Championship in (Spain) Ibiza
- April 6–13: 26th World Championship Long Casting of Sea Weights (Seniors) and 10th WC Long Casting of Sea Weights (Ladies) in (Italy) Viterbo
- April 20–27: 2nd World Championship Light tackle Boat Angling in (South Africa) Mossel Bay
  - Event was cancelled
- April 27 – May 4: 6th World Championship Shore Angling Pair Angling in (Spain) Ceuta
- May 11–18: 31st World Championship Shore Angling Clubs in (France) Bias
- August 24–31: 23rd World Championship Boat Angling Juniors in (Republic of Ireland) Rathmullan
- October 1–5: 1st World Championship Sea Float Angling in (Greece) Samos
- October 12–19: 59th World Championship Boat Angling Seniors in (Republic of Ireland) Cork Harbour
- October 19–26: 7th World Championship for Masters (over 55) in (Cyprus) Paphos
- October 26–31: 1st World Championship Kayak Fishing in (Spain) Valencia
- November 2–9: 32nd World Championship YOUTH (U16) and 23rd Worldchampionship JUNIORS (U21) in (Republic of Ireland) Wexford
- November 16–23: 40th World Championship Seniors and 31st World Championship Ladies in (Spain) Peniscola
- November 23–30: 32nd World Championship Big-game fishing (Trolling) in (Mexico) Cabo San Lucas

== Stand up paddling ==
- ICF Events calendar here.

=== World & Continental Championships ===
- June 12–15: 2024 ECA Stand Up Paddling European Championships in (Hungary) Szeged
- November 20–24: 2024 ICF Stand Up Paddling World Championships in (United States) Sarasota

=== 2024 ICF Stand Up Paddling World Cup ===
- September 27–29: World Cup in (Greece) Agios Nikolaos

=== 2024 ICF SUP World Ranking Series ===
- April 5–7: Ranking Race - Spring SUP Race in (Italy) Comacchio
- August 9–11: Ranking Race - Baltic Skrea Beach Paddle Race in (Sweden) Falkenberg

=== Other Competitions ===
- May 5: Padova Water Marathon in (Italy) Padova
- August 10–11: International Slovak Championships in (Slovakia) Bratislava

== Surfing ==
=== Major International Events ===
- February 23 – March 3: 2024 ISA World Surfing Games in (Puerto Rico) Arecibo
  - Winners: (Brazil) Gabriel Medina (m) / (Australia) Sally Fitzgibbons (w)
  - Team winners: Brazil
- July 27 – August 5: 2024 Summer Olympics in (France) Paris

=== 2024 World Surf League ===
- January 29 – February 10: Billabong Pipeline Masters in (Hawaii) Banzai Pipeline (Oahu)
  - Winners: (Hawaii) Barron Mamiya (m) / (United States) Caitlin Simmers (w)
- February 12–23: Hurley Pro Sunset Beach in (Hawaii) Sunset Beach (Oahu)
  - Winners: (Australia) Jack Robinson (m) / (Australia) Molly Picklum (w)
- March 6–16: MEO Pro Portugal in Supertubos (Peniche)
  - Winners: (United States) Griffin Colapinto (m) / (France) Johanne Defay (w)
- March 26 – April 5: Rip Curl Pro in (Australia) Bells Beach, Victoria
  - Winners: (United States) Cole Houshmand (m) / (United States) Caitlin Simmers (w)
- April 11–21: Margaret River Pro in Margaret River, Western Australia
  - Winners: (Australia) Jack Robinson (m) / (Hawaii) Gabriela Bryan (w)
- May 22–31: SHISEIDO Tahiti Pro in (French Polynesia) Teahupo'o
- June 6–15: Surf City El Salvador Pro in La Libertad
- June 22–30: Rio Pro in (Brazil) Saquarema
- August 20–29: Corona Fiji Pro in Tavarua
- September 6–14: 2024 World Surf League Finals in (United States) San Clemente, California

== Swimming ==
- WA Swimming Calendar here and here.
- LEN Swimming Calendar here

=== World Championships ===
- December 10–15: 2024 World Aquatics Swimming Championships (25 m) in (Hungary) Budapest

=== 2024 World Aquatics Swimming World Cup ===
- October 18–20: Stop 1 in (China) Shanghai
- October 24–26: Stop 2 in (South Korea) Incheon
- October 31– November 2: Stop 3 in Singapore

== Underwater hockey ==
- CMAS Underwater hockey Calendar here.

=== CMAS International Competitions ===
- July 19–27: 6th CMAS Underwater Hockey Age Group World Championship in (Malaysia) Kuala Lumpur
- August 8–11: 8th Asian Underwater Hockey Cup in Singapore

== Underwater orienteering ==
=== CMAS International Competitions ===
- September 1–8: 32nd CMAS Open European and 15th Junior Open European Orienteering Championships in (Germany) Grünheide

== Underwater photography ==
=== CMAS International Competitions ===
- October 7–12: 20th CMAS Underwater Photography and 6th CMAS Underwater Video World Championships in (Albania) Vlorë

== Underwater target shooting ==
=== CMAS International Competitions ===
- March 2: International Open of Uruguay in Uruguay
  - Seniors precision winners: (France) Benjamin Delmotte (m) / (Uruguay) Marianela Pereyra (w)
  - Seniors biathlon winners: (France) Antoine Cupif (m) / (Uruguay) Marianela Pereyra (w)
  - Seniors super-biathlon winners: (France) Antoine Cupif (m) / (Uruguay) Marianela Pereyra (w)
  - Mixed relay winners: (France) SCF FRANCE
- October 16–20: Target Shooting World Cup in (Tunisia) Tunis

== Water polo ==
=== World & Continental championships ===
- January 4–16: 2024 Men's European Water Polo Championship in Croatia
  - (gold) Spain; (silver) Croatia; (bronze) Italy
- January 5–13: 2024 Women's European Water Polo Championship in Netherlands
  - (gold) Netherlands; (silver) Spain; (bronze) Greece
- June 18–24: 2024 World Men's U16 Water Polo Championships in Malta
- June 28 – July 4: 2024 World Women's U16 Water Polo Championships in (Turkey) Manisa
- July 2–8: 2024 FINA Men's Youth Water Polo World Championships in (Argentina) Buenos Aires
- August 17–24: 2024 FINA Women's Youth Water Polo World Championships in China
- September 1–7: 2024 Men's LEN European U19 Water Polo Championship in (Bulgaria) Burgas
- September 1–7: 2024 Women's LEN European U19 Water Polo Championship in (Croatia) Zagreb

== Wakeboarding ==
=== World Wake Association ===
World & Continental Championships

- September 21–24: 2024 WWA Wakeboard & Wake Park World Championships in (Australia) Gold Coast
- July 13–14: 2024 Nautique European Wakesurf Championships in (United Kingdom) London

WWA Aussie Triple Crown

- March 9: Stop 1 in (Australia) Bangholme
- March 16: Stop 2 in (Australia) Andergrove
- March 23: Stop 3 in (Australia) Bli Bli

=== IWWF Cable Wakeboard Events ===
World & Continental Championships

- June 27–30: INTL 5 STAR IWWF European Open Confederation Championships in (United Kingdom) Whitemills Wake Park
- July 19–21: 2024 Wakeboarding Panam Championships in United States
- August 26–31: 2024 Wakeboarding Youth & Senior European Championships in (Italy) Settimo Torinese
- September 14–22: 2024 Wakeboarding World Championships in France

International Events

- March 8–10: INTL 2 STAR 2024 IWWF Cable Wakeboard Lotus Open in (Chinese Taipei) Kaohsiung
- March 29–31: INTL 4 STAR Cold Water Classic 24 in (Belgium) Knokke-Heist
- May 3–4: INTL 4 STAR X-Wake Opening in Austria Area 47
- June 15–16: INTL 3 STAR Wakelake Golden Trophy 2024 in (Slovakia) Bratislava
- July 26–27: INTL 3 STAR BLACKCOMB.CZ COMMUNITY WAKE CUP 2024 in (Czech Republic) Těrlicko
- August 2–4: Sibiu Wake Trophy in (Romania) Sibiu
- August 15–16: INTL 3 STAR Austrian Wakeboard Cup 2024–4 in (Austria) Feldkirchen
- September 27–28: INTL 3 STAR Ollie Cup 2024 in (Slovenia) Spodnji Duplek
- October 2–10: INTL 4 STAR CWWC Tour Final 2024 in (Germany) Marburg
- October 18–20: INTL 3 STAR The Spin Cup 2024 in Belgium

== Water skiing ==
- For Full IWWF Calendar here.

=== World & Continental Championships ===
- July 27 – August 3: 2024 IWWF World Under 17 Waterski Championships at the (Canada) Predator Bay
- August 21–24: 2024 Europe & Africa Barefoot Championships in Netherlands
- September 4–8: 2024 IWWF World Over 35 Waterski Championships in (Spain) Seseña
- October 5 – 12: 2024 IWWF Open, U23 & Junior World Barefoot Water Ski Championships at the (United States) Lake Myrtle
- October 7 – 13: 2024 IWWF Water Ski Panamerican Championship in Colombia
- October 22–25: 2024 European Cable-ski Open Championships in Israel
- November 3–10: 2024 IWWF World Wakesurf Championships in Hong Kong

== Wildwater canoeing ==
- ICF Events calendar here.

=== World & Continental Championships ===
- July 3–6: 2024 ECA Junior and U23 Wildwater Canoeing European Championships in (Switzerland) Dallenwil
- August 14–16: 2024 ICF Wildwater Canoeing Master World Championships in (Spain) Sabero
- August 14–18: 2024 ICF Wildwater Canoeing World Championships in (Spain) Sabero

=== World Cup ===
- June 14–16: 2024 ICF Wildwater Canoeing World Cup 1&2 in (North Macedonia) Veles
- June 20–23: 2024 ICF Wildwater Canoeing World Cup 3&4 in (Italy) Mezzana

=== Continental Cup ===
- March 2–3: 2024 ECA Cup St Laurent Blangy in (France) Saint-Laurent-Blangy
  - Results: Sprint
- March 9–10: 52. International Fulda Canoe Race, ECA Cup Sprint in (Germany) Fulda
  - Results: Sprint, Classic
- April 6–7: 2024 ECA Cup Holme Pierrepont in (United Kingdom) Nottingham
- April 20–21: 2024 ECA Cup Banja Luka in (Bosnia and Herzegovina) Banja Luka
- May 22–25: 2024 ECA Cup Wildalpen - German Championships in (Austria) Wildalpen
- November 23–24: 2024 ECA Cup River Dee in (United Kingdom) Llangollen

=== Other Competitions ===
- March 23–24: 51. International Bayerwald WW Race on river (Germany) Ilz
- April 6–7: WWC Valstagna (Level 4 Event) in (Italy) Valstagna
- May 18: 2. Wildwater Slovak Open (WWC SPRINT) in (Slovakia) Bratislava
