= ISA World SUP and Paddleboard Championship =

International paddleboarding competition

Tournament information
- Sport: SUP
- Established: 2012
- Administrator: International Surfing Association

The ISA World SUP and Paddleboard Championship is the premier SUP/Paddleboard championship organised by the International Surfing Association. The competition has been held since 2012 and has taken place roughly annually since. There is a similar world championship in this discipline organized by the International Canoe Federation called the ICF Stand Up Paddling World Championships, which originated a litigation from ISA to the ICF. The arbitration was eventually ruled in favor of allowing to keep both championships by CAS, but giving ISA the international recognition of the sport in case of an entry at the Olympic Games.

== Venues ==
Year	Location	Ref.
2012	(Peru) Lima	
2013	(Peru) Lima	
2014	(Nicaragua) Granada / La Boquita	
2015	(Mexico) Sayulita	
2016	(Fiji) Tavarua	
2017	(Denmark) Copenhagen / Vorupør	
2018	(China) Wanning	
2019	(El Salvador) El Sunzal	
2022	(Puerto Rico) San Juan	
2023	(France) Les Sables-d'Olonne	
2024	(Denmark) Copenhagen	

== Elite Medalists ==
=== Men ===
==== SUP Technical race ====
Year	Gold	Silver	Bronze
2012	Travis Grant (AUS)	Jamie Mitchell (AUS)	Paul Jackson (NZL)
2013	Casper Steinfath (DEN)	Jamie Mitchell (AUS)	Dylan Frick (RSA)
2014	Casper Steinfath (DEN)	Lincoln Dews (AUS)	Slater Trout (USA)
2015	Connor Baxter (HAW)	Mo Freitas (HAW)	Titouan Puyo (FRA)
2016	Casper Steinfath (DEN)	Kai Lenny (HAW)	Arthur Arutkin (FRA)
2017	Mo Freitas (HAW)	Connor Baxter (HAW)	Casper Steinfath (DEN)
2018	Daniel Hasulyo (HUN)	Connor Baxter (USA)	Trevor Tunnington (NZL)
2019	Titouan Puyo (FRA)	Connor Baxter (USA)	Vinnicius Martins (BRA)
2022	Shuri Araki (JPN)	Noïc Garioud (FRA)	Titouan Puyo (FRA)
2023	Shuri Araki (JPN)	Noïc Garioud (FRA)	Rai Taguchi (JPN)
2024	Rai Taguchi (JPN)	Aarón Sánchez (ESP)	Riccardo Rossi (ITA)
2024	Shuri Araki (JPN)	Christian Andersen (DEN)	Guilherme Reis (BRA)

==== SUP Technical race junior ====
Year	Gold	Silver	Bronze	Copper
2018	Ryan Funk (USA)	Oliver Houghton (NZL)	Sam McCullough (AUS)	Noïc Garioud (FRA)
2019	Christian Andersen (DEN)	Rai Taguchi (JPN)	Marius Auber (FRA)	Tyler Bashor (USA)
2022	Vaïc Garioud (FRA)	Shimazu Nariakira (JPN)	Campbell Carter (USA)	Lucas Simoncelli (ESP)
2023	Vaïc Garioud (FRA)	Donato Freens (NED)	Shimazu Nariakira (JPN)	Campbell Carter (USA)
2024	Kotaro Miyahira (JPN)	Lluís Peroti (ESP)	Vaïc Garioud (FRA)	Nicolò Ricco (ITA)

==== SUP Long distance ====
Year	Gold	Silver	Bronze
2012	Jamie Mitchell (AUS)	Travis Grant (AUS)	Eric Terrien (FRA)
2013	Jamie Mitchell (AUS)	Casper Steinfath (DEN)	Fernando Stalla (MEX)
2014	Titouan Puyo (FRA)	Lincoln Dews (AUS)	Eric Terrien (FRA)
2015	Danny Ching (USA)	Javier Jiménez (MEX)	Connor Baxter (HAW)
2016	Michael Booth (AUS)	Titouan Puyo (FRA)	Georges Cronstead (TAH)
2017	Bruno Hasulyo (HUN)	Connor Baxter (HAW)	Titouan Puyo (FRA)
2018	Michael Booth (AUS)	Bruno Hasulyo (HUN)	Vinnicius Martins (BRA)
2019	Vinnicius Martins (BRA)	Itzel Delgado (PER)	Titouan Puyo (FRA)
2022	Shuri Araki (JPN)	Titouan Puyo (FRA)	Michael Booth (AUS)
2023	Shuri Araki (JPN)	Titouan Puyo (FRA)	Rai Taguchi (JPN)
2024	Rai Taguchi (JPN)	Clément Colmas (FRA)	Kotaro Miyahira (JPN)
2025	Shuri Araki (JPN)	Ethan Bry (FRA)	Nicolo Ricco (ITA)

==== SUP Sprint race ====
Year	Gold	Silver	Bronze
2016	Casper Steinfath (DEN)	Slater Trout (USA)	Kenny Kaneko (JPN)
2017	Casper Steinfath (DEN)	Trevor Tunnington (NZL)	Arthur Santacreu (BRA)
2018	Arthur Carvalho (BRA)	Trevor Tunnington (NZL)	Connor Baxter (USA)
2019	Claudio Nika (ITA)	Connor Baxter (USA)	Titouan Puyo (FRA)
2022	Connor Baxter (USA)	Noïc Garioud (FRA)	David Leao (BRA)
2023	Noïc Garioud (FRA)	Ollie Houghton (NZL)	Claudio Nika (ITA)
2024	David Leão (BRA)	Manuel Hoyuela (ESP)	Noïc Garioud (FRA)
2025	Christian Andersen (DEN)	Ethan Bry (FRA)	Sergio Cantoral (ESP)

==== Paddleboard technical race ====
Year	Gold	Silver	Bronze
2012	Brad Gaul (AUS)	Joel Mason (AUS)	Ryan Butcher (RSA)
2013	Lincoln Dews (AUS)	Brad Gaul (AUS)	Ryan Butcher (RSA)
2014	Rhys Burrows (AUS)	Andrew Newton (NZL)	Rory Chapman (AUS)
2015	Jack Bark (USA)	Lachie Lansdown (AUS)	Cory Taylor (NZL)
2016	Matt Poole (AUS)	Lachie Lansdown (AUS)	Scott Cowdrey (NZL)
2017	Lachie Lansdown (AUS)	Sam Shergold (NZL)	Julien Lalanne (FRA)
2018	Lachie Lansdown (AUS)	Hunter Pflueger (USA)	Daniel Hart (NZL)
2019	Julen Marticorena (FRA)	Bart Schade (USA)	Carlos Alonso (ESP)
2022	Hunter Pflueger (USA)	Julen Marticorena (FRA)	Andrew Newton (NZL)
2023	Julen Marticorena (FRA)	Andrew Byatt (ENG)	Carlos Alonso (ESP)
2024	Andrew Byatt (ENG)	Baptiste Cochard (FRA)	Carlos Alonso (ESP)
2025	Mael Tissier (FRA)	Lukas Pohlman (USA)	Carlos Alonso (ESP)

==== Paddleboard long distance ====
Year	Gold	Silver	Bronze
2012	Brad Gaul (AUS)	Joel Mason (AUS)	Shane Scoggins (USA)
2013	Brad Gaul (AUS)	Lincoln Dews (AUS)	Ryan Butcher (RSA)
2014	Rhys Burrows (AUS)	Sam Shergold (NZL)	Rory Chapman (AUS)
2015	Lachie Lansdown (AUS)	Jack Bark (USA)	Cory Taylor (NZL)
2016	Sam Shergold (NZL)	Matt Poole (AUS)	Lachie Lansdown (AUS)
2017	Lachie Lansdown (AUS)	Sam Shergold (NZL)	Bart Schade (USA)
2018	Hunter Pflueger (USA)	Lachie Lansdown (AUS)	Jadon Wessels (RSA)
2019	Hunter Pflueger (USA)	David Buil (ESP)	Sam Norton (ENG)
2022	Hunter Pflueger (USA)	Julen Marticorena (FRA)	David Buil (ESP)
2023	David Buil (ESP)	Andrew Byatt (ENG)	Julen Marticorena (FRA)
2024	Andrew Byatt (ENG)	David Buil (ESP)	Donald Miralle (USA)
2025	Mael Tissier (FRA)	So Nomura (JPN)	David Buil (ESP)

==== SUP Surfing ====
Year	Gold	Silver	Bronze
2012	Antoine Delpero (FRA)	Justin Holland (AUS)	Sean Poynter (USA)
2013	Sean Poynter (USA)	Tamil Martino (PER)	Antoine Delpero (FRA)
2014	Poenaiki Raioha (TAH)	Jackson Close (AUS)	Antoine Delpero (FRA)
2015	Sean Poynter (USA)	Poenaiki Raioha (TAH)	Felipe Hernandez (MEX)
2016	Zane Schweitzer (HAW)	Mo Freitas (HAW)	Giorgio Gómez (USA)
2017	Luis Diniz (BRA)	Harry Maskell (AUS)	Benoit Carpentier (FRA)
2018	Luis Diniz (BRA)	Harry Maskell (AUS)	Caio Vaz (BRA)
2019	Benoit Carpentier (FRA)	Airton Cozzolino (ITA)	Alex Salazar (BRA)
2022	Luiz Diniz (BRA)	Benoit Carpentier (FRA)	Zane Schweitzer (USA)
2023	Max Torres (PUR)	Wes Fry (AUS)	Kai Bates (AUS)
2025	Luis Diniz (BRA)	Maximilian Torres (PUR)	Kapono Fukuda (JPN)

=== Women ===
==== SUP Technical race ====
Year	Gold	Silver	Bronze
2012	Brandi Baksic (USA)	Angie Jackson (AUS)	Karina Figl (AUT)
2013	Angie Jackson (AUS)	Olivia Piana (FRA)	Barbara Brasil (BRA)
2014	Shakira Westdorp (AUS)	Lina Augaitis (CAN)	Jenny Calmbach (CRC)
2015	Candice Appleby (USA)	Terrene Black (AUS)	Penelope Armstrong (NZL)
2016	Penelope Armstrong (USA)	Olivia Piana (FRA)	Candice Appleby (USA)
2017	Annabel Anderson (NZL)	Olivia Piana (FRA)	Terrene Black (AUS)
2018	Candice Appleby (USA)	Terrene Black (AUS)	Shakira Westdorp (AUS)
2019	Esperanza Barreras (ESP)	Amandine Chazot (FRA)	Rika Okuaki (JPN)
2022	Candice Appleby (USA)	Esperanza Barreras (ESP)	Mélanie Lafenêtre (FRA)
2023	Esperanza Barreras (ESP)	Mélanie Lafenêtre (FRA)	Maricarmen Rivera (PUR)
2024	Duna Gordillo (ESP)	Esperanza Barreras (ESP)	Maricarmen Rivera (PUR)
2025	Juliette DuHaime (ARG)	Maricarmen Rivera (PUR)	Duna Gordillo (ESP)

==== SUP Technical race junior ====
Year	Gold	Silver	Bronze	Copper
2018	Jade Howson (USA)	Melanie Lafenetre (FRA)	Caroline Küntzel (DEN)	Laura Dal Pont (ITA)
2019	Jade Howson (USA)	Duna Gordillo (ESP)	Laura Dal Pont (ITA)	Anaïs Guyomarch (FRA)
2022	Cecilia Pampinella (ITA)	Sonia Caimari (ESP)	Soryn Preston (USA)	Yu Tachibana (JAP)
2023	Cecilia Pampinella (ITA)	Soryn Preston (USA)	Elene Etxeberria (ESP)	Rebeka Klotz (BRA)
2024	Virág Csillag-Kocsis (HUN)	Alexia Soto (ESP)	Soryn Preston (USA)	Cecilia Pampinella (ITA)

==== SUP Long distance ====
Year	Gold	Silver	Bronze
2012	Brandi Baksic (USA)	Angie Jackson (AUS)	Brigette van Aswegen (RSA)
2013	Angie Jackson (AUS)	Olivia Piana (FRA)	Shannon Bell (CAN)
2014	Lina Augaitis (CAN)	Shakira Westdorp (AUS)	Barbara Brasil (BRA)
2015	Candice Appleby (USA)	Lina Augaitis (CAN)	Terrene Black (AUS)
2016	Candice Appleby (USA)	Olivia Piana (FRA)	Laura Quetglas (ESP)
2017	Annabel Anderson (NZL)	Sonni Hönscheid (GER)	Olivia Piana (FRA)
2018	Olivia Piana (FRA)	Terrene Black (AUS)	Shakira Westdorp (AUS)
2019	Esperanza Barreras (ESP)	Amandine Chazot (FRA)	Rika Okuaki (JPN)
2022	Duna Gordillo (ESP)	Esperanza Barreras (ESP)	Mélanie Lafenêtre (FRA)
2023	Esperanza Barreras (ESP)	Duna Gordillo (ESP)	Maricarmen Rivera (PUR)
2024	Esperanza Barreras (ESP)	Maricarmen Rivera (PUR)	Duna Gordillo (ESP)
2025	Duna Gordillo (ESP)	Maricarmen Rivera (PUR)	Alba Alonso (ESP)

==== SUP Sprint ====
Year	Gold	Silver	Bronze
2016	Lina Augaitis (CAN)	Candice Appleby (USA)	Manca Lotar (SLO)
2017	Manca Lotar (SLO)	Amandine Chazot (FRA)	Jade Howson (USA)
2018	Tarryn King (RSA)	Caterina Stenta (ITA)	Jade Howson (USA)
2019	Jade Howson (USA)	Jessika Matos de Souza (BRA)	Caterina Stenta (ITA)
2022	April Zilg (USA)	Caroline Küntzel (DEN)	Maricarmen Rivera (PUR)
2023	Mélanie Lafenêtre (FRA)	Maricarmen Rivera (PUR)	Tarryn King (RSA)
2024	Alba Alonso (ESP)	Cecilia Pampinella (ITA)	Mélanie Lafenêtre (FRA)
2025	Maricarmen Rivera (PUR)	Alba Alonso (ESP)	Cecilia Pampinella (ITA)

==== Paddleboard technical race ====
Year	Gold	Silver	Bronze
2012	Jordan Mercer (AUS)	Anna Notten (RSA)	Concepción Escatllar (ESP)
2013	Jordan Mercer (AUS)	Anna Notten (RSA)	Rocío Larrañaga (PER)
2014	Jordan Mercer (AUS)	Carter Craves (USA)	Itziar Abascal (ESP)
2015	Jordan Mercer (AUS)	Carter Craves (USA)	Itziar Abascal (ESP)
2016	Harriet Brown (AUS)	Danielle McKenzie (NZL)	Flora Manciet (FRA)
2017	Jordan Mercer (AUS)	Jasmine Smith (NZL)	Kathrine Zink (DEN)
2018	Grace Rosado (AUS)	Judit Vergés (ESP)	Kathrine Zink (DEN)
2019	Itziar Abascal (ESP)	Yurika Mitsui (JPN)	Cornelia Rigatti (ITA)
2022	Judit Vergés (ESP)	Cornelia Rigatti (ITA)	Yurika Horibe (JPN)
2023	Judit Vergés (ESP)	Cornelia Rigatti (ITA)	Molly Roodhouse (ENG)
2024	Judit Vergés (ESP)	Élise Daudignon (FRA)	Cornelia Rigatti (ITA)
2025	Yurika Horibe (JPN)	Judit Vergés (ESP)	Thais Delrieux (FRA)

==== Paddleboard long distance ====
Year	Gold	Silver	Bronze
2012	Jordan Mercer (AUS)	Anna Notten (RSA)	Gillian Gibree (RSA)
2013	Jordan Mercer (AUS)	Anna Notten (RSA)	Rocío Larranaga (PER)
2014	Jordan Mercer (AUS)	Carter Craves (USA)	Itziar Abascal (ESP)
2015	Jordan Mercer (AUS)	Anna Notten (RSA)	Carter Graves (USA)
2016	Harriet Brown (AUS)	Danielle McKenzie (NZL)	Flora Manciet (FRA)
2017	Jordan Mercer (AUS)	Jessica Miller (NZL)	Kathrine Zink (DEN)
2018	Grace Rosado (AUS)	Judit Vergés (ESP)	Kailyn Winter (USA)
2019	Tyra Buncombe (RSA)	Camile Rosa Perottea (ITA)	Daniela Spais (ARG)
2022	Yurika Horibe (JPN)	Judit Vergés (ESP)	Cornelia Rigatti (ITA)
2023	Yurika Horibe (JPN)	Judit Vergés (ESP)	Cornelia Rigatti (ITA)
2024	Molly Roodhouse (ENG)	Yurika Horibe (JPN)	Judit Vergés (ESP)
2025	Judit Vergés (ESP)	Yurika Horibe (JPN)	Thais Delrieux (FRA)

==== SUP Surfing ====
Year	Gold	Silver	Bronze
2012	Emily Merrill (USA)	Shakira Westdorp (AUS)	Penny Stemmet (RSA)
2013	Nicole Pacelli (BRA)	Shakira Westdorp (AUS)	Iballa Ruano (ESP)
2014	Emily Merrill (USA)	Caroline Angibaud (FRA)	Shakira Westdorp (AUS)
2015	Izzi Gómez (USA)	Nicole Pacelli (BRA)	Iballa Ruano (ESP)
2016	Shakira Westdorp (AUS)	Izzi Gómez (USA)	Brissa Malaga (PER)
2017	Shakira Westdorp (AUS)	Justine Dupont (FRA)	Emmy Mirrell (USA)
2018	Shakira Westdorp (AUS)	Iballa Ruano (ESP)	Stella Smith (NZL)
2019	Justine Dupont (FRA)	Shakira Westdorp (AUS)	Iballa Ruano (ESP)
2022	Lucía Cosoleto (ARG)	Kaede Inoue (JPN)	Aline Adisaka (BRA)
2023	Lucía Cosoleto (ARG)	Aline Adisaka (BRA)	Billie Scott (NZL)
2025	Vania Torres (PER)	Lucías Cosoleto (ARG)	Aline Adsaka (BRA)

=== Mixed ===
==== Relay ====
Year	Gold	Silver	Bronze
2012	Australia (AUS)	United States (USA)	South Africa (RSA)
2013	Australia (AUS)	South Africa (RSA)	France (FRA)
2014	Australia (AUS)	United States (USA)	Spain (ESP)
2015	Australia (AUS)	New Zealand (NZL)	United States (USA)
2016	Hawaii (HAW)	New Zealand (NZL)	Australia (AUS)
2017	Australia (AUS)	France (FRA)	New Zealand (NZL)
2018	Australia (AUS)	United States (USA)	New Zealand (NZL)
2019	Spain (ESP)	France (FRA)	United States (USA)
2022	France (FRA)	Japan (JPN)	Spain (ESP)
2023	France (FRA)	Italy (ITA)	Japan (JPN)
2024	Japan (JPN)	Spain (ESP)	France (FRA)

==== Team points ====
Year	Gold	Silver	Bronze
2012	Australia (AUS)	United States (USA)	South Africa (RSA)
2013	Australia (AUS)	South Africa (RSA)	Mexico (MEX)
2014	Australia (AUS)	United States (USA)	Brazil (BRA)
2015	United States (USA)	Australia (AUS)	Hawaii (HAW)
2016	Australia (AUS)	France (FRA)	New Zealand (NZL)
2017	Australia (AUS)	France (FRA)	New Zealand (NZL)
2018	Australia (AUS)	United States (USA)	France (FRA)
2019	France (FRA)	Spain (ESP)	United States (USA)
2022	France (FRA)	Spain (ESP)	Japan (JPN)
2023	France (FRA)	Spain (ESP)	Japan (JPN)
2024	Spain (ESP)	Japan (JPN)	France (FRA)
