= Teneale Hatton =

New Zealand canoeist

Personal information
- Born: 13 January 1990 (age 36) Queenstown, New Zealand
- Height: 167 cm (5 ft 6 in)
- Weight: 64 kg (141 lb)
Medal record
Representing New Zealand
Women's canoe sprint
World Championships
Gold medal – first place	2013 Duisburg	K-1 5000 m
Gold medal – first place	2014 Moscow	K-1 1000 m
Women's canoe ocean racing
World Championships
Gold medal – first place	2015 Tahiti	SS-1
Bronze medal – third place	2017 Hong Kong	SS-1
Bronze medal – third place	2019 Saint-Pierre-Quiberon	SS-1

Teneale Hatton (born 13 January 1990 in Queenstown, Otago) is a New Zealand flatwater canoeist.

Hatton has two older brothers and moved from her hometown, Queenstown, to Auckland at the age of five. She attended Carmel College and as of 2012 studies at the University of Auckland. She is 1.68 metres (5 ft 6 in) tall and weighs 63 kilograms (139 lb). She is coached by four-time Olympic gold medallist Ian Ferguson.

As well as canoeing, Hatton has competed in surf lifesaving events; she won four medals, three gold and a bronze, at the 2009 Australian surf lifesaving championships in Perth. She combines competing with work as a paramedic.

== Canoeing ==
At the 2009 Australian Youth Olympic Festival Hatton won the gold medal in the women's K-1 1000 metres event and a silver in the 500 metres event. In June 2009 she won a bronze medal, competing alongside Lisa Carrington in the women's K-2 1000 metres event, at the World Cup regatta held in Szeged, Hungary. In May 2010 the pair won the gold medal in the same event at a World Cup regatta in Vichy, France.

Hatton and Carrington won three gold medals at the 2010 Oceania Canoe Championships; they won the 500 and 100 metres K-2 events and were joined by Rachael Dodwell and Erin Taylor to win the K-4 500 metres. The pair became the first New Zealanders to reach a World Championship A final at the ICF Canoe Sprint World Championships in Poznań, Poland; their semifinal time of one minute 42.365 seconds meant they were the third fastest qualifiers in the K-2 500 metres, however they finished ninth in the final. Hatton was also part of the women's 500 metres K-4 crew that finished in eleventh position at the Championships.

Hatton was selected to represent New Zealand at the 2012 Summer Olympics in London, United Kingdom. She competed in the women's K-1 500 metres event between 7 and 9 August at Eton Dorney, finishing in 15th place.

In 2014 Hatton won the K-1 1000 m event at the World Championships, only the second non-European to do so. It was a championship record time of 3:49.423.

Hatton also competes in ocean canoe racing, where she won the 2015 Senior World Title.
