= Araneus gazerti =

Scientific classification
- Kingdom: Animalia
- Phylum: Arthropoda
- Subphylum: Chelicerata
- Class: Arachnida
- Order: Araneae
- Infraorder: Araneomorphae
- Family: Araneidae
- Genus: Araneus
- Species: A. gazerti

Binomial name
- Araneus gazerti (Strand, 1909)

Species of spider

Araneus gazerti is a species of spider in the family Araneidae. It is endemic to the Western Cape of South Africa.

== Distribution ==
Araneus gazerti is known only from Fish Hoek in the Western Cape, at an altitude of 50 m above sea level.

== Habitat and ecology ==
The juvenile specimens were collected in July 1903 from the Fynbos biome. Nothing is known about their behaviour.

== Conservation ==
Araneus gazerti is listed as Data Deficient for Taxonomic reasons. Identification of this species is problematic as juveniles are difficult to identify and no drawings were provided. The status of the species remains obscure.

== Taxonomy ==
The species was originally described from four juveniles by Embrik Strand in 1909 as Aranea gazerti from Fish Hoek. Due to the absence of type material in combination with description based on a juvenile, with lack of recollection and illustration, there are strong arguments to consider the species as a nomen dubium.
