= Araneus fishoekensis =

Scientific classification
- Kingdom: Animalia
- Phylum: Arthropoda
- Subphylum: Chelicerata
- Class: Arachnida
- Order: Araneae
- Infraorder: Araneomorphae
- Family: Araneidae
- Genus: Araneus
- Species: A. fishoekensis

Binomial name
- Araneus fishoekensis (Strand, 1909)

Species of spider

Araneus fishoekensis is a species of spider in the family Araneidae. It is endemic to the Western Cape of South Africa.

== Distribution ==
Araneus fishoekensis is known only from Fish Hoek in the Western Cape, at an altitude of 50 m above sea level.

== Habitat and ecology ==
The 3 mm juvenile specimen was collected in July 1903 from the Fynbos biome. Nothing is known about the behaviour.

== Conservation ==
Araneus fishoekensis is listed as Data Deficient for Taxonomic reasons. Too little is known about the location, habitat and threats of this taxon for an assessment to be made. Identification of the species is problematic.

== Taxonomy ==
The species was originally described by Embrik Strand in 1909 as Aranea fishoekensis from Fish Hoek. The description is based on an immature specimen. Due to the absence of type material in combination with description based on a juvenile, with lack of recollection and illustration, there are strong arguments to consider the species as a nomen dubium.
