= Chazot (surname) =

Chazot is a surname of French origin. Notable people with the surname include:

- Amandine Chazot (1991–2024), French paddleboarder
- Émile-Augustin Chazot, (1805–1854), French magistrate and politician
- Jacques Chazot (1928–1993), French dancer and socialite
- Jean-Pierre François de Chazot (1739–1797), a major general of the French Revolution
- Patrick Chazot (born 1958), French athlete
- Paul de Chazot (1802–1880), French politician

== See also ==
- Chazot, commune in France
