= Connor Baxter =

American standup paddleboarder (born 1994)

Personal information
- Born: September 15, 1994 (age 31) Maui, Hawaii, U.S.

Surfing career
- Sport: Surfing

Connor Baxter (born September 15, 1994, in Maui) is an American standup paddleboarder. Between 2015 and 2022, he was the recipient of one gold medal, five silver medals, and two bronze medals in the long distance, technical, and sprint races at the ISA World SUP and Paddleboard Championship. At the ICF Stand Up Paddling World Championships, he has won two silver medals (2019, 2021) and one gold medal (2022) in the technical race, and a further two gold medals (2019, 2022) and one silver (2021) in the sprint race. At the 2019 Pan American Games, he won a gold medal in standup paddleboarding race. At the 2022 ISA World SUP and Paddleboard Championship, he won a gold medal in the sprint race. He has also served as a brand ambassador for the sportswear brand Dakine.
