= Fish Hoek =

Suburb in Western Cape, South Africa

Fish Hoek Vishoek
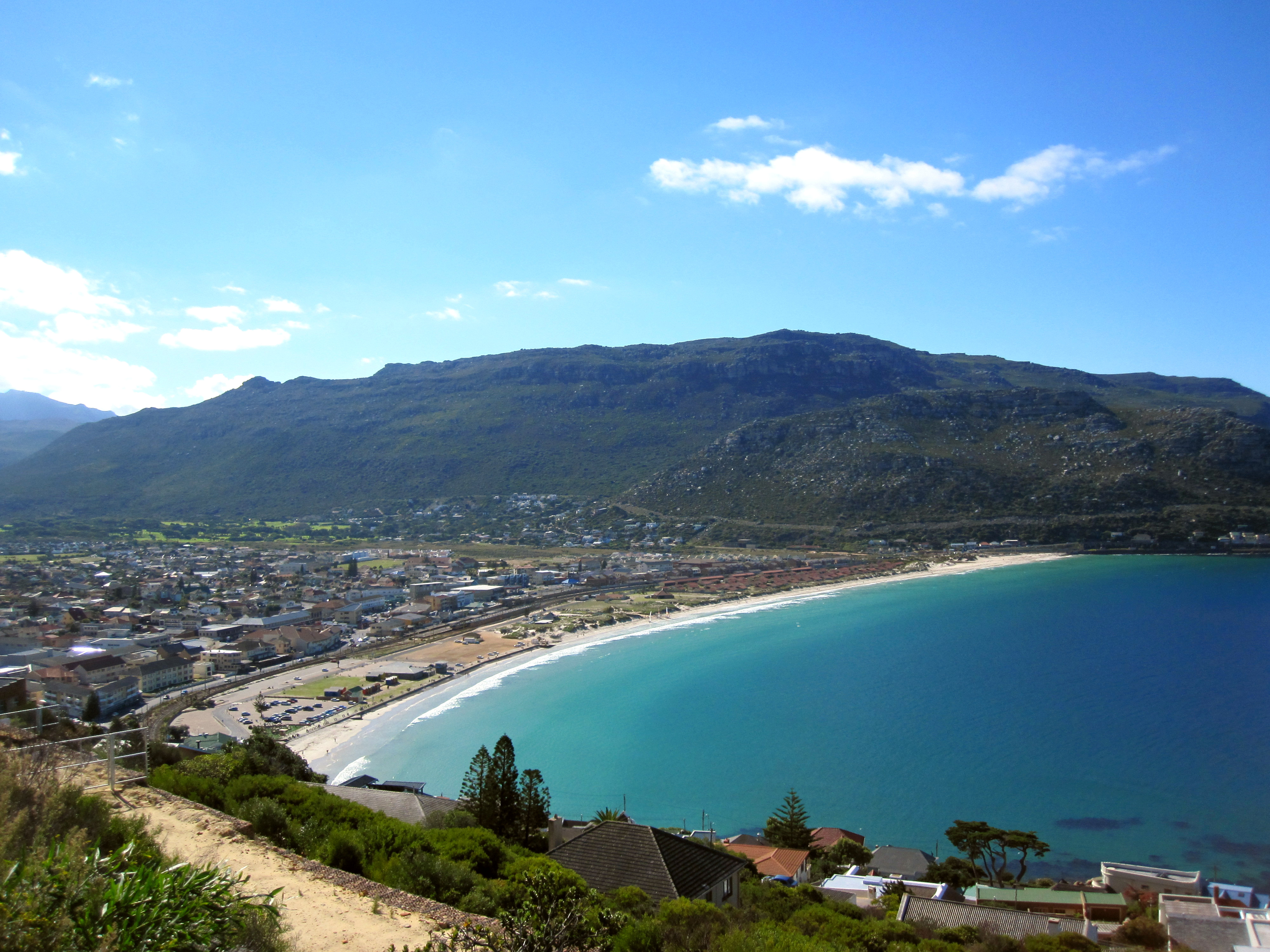
- The view of Fish Hoek Bay from Elsie's Peak towards Clovelly.

- Location within Western Cape Location within South Africa
- Coordinates: 34.136°S 18.430°E
- Country: South Africa
- Province: Western Cape
- Municipality: City of Cape Town

Area
  - Total: 13.45 km^{2} (5.19 sq mi)

Population (2011)
  - Total: 11,890
  - Density: 884.0/km^{2} (2,290/sq mi)

Racial makeup (2011)
  - Black African: 9.7%
  - Coloured: 5.1%
  - Indian/Asian: 1.2%
  - White: 82.2%
  - Other: 1.9%

First languages (2011)
  - English: 83.0%
  - Afrikaans: 12.6%
  - Other: 4.4%
- Time zone: UTC+2 (SAST)
- Postal code (street): 7975
- PO box: 7974

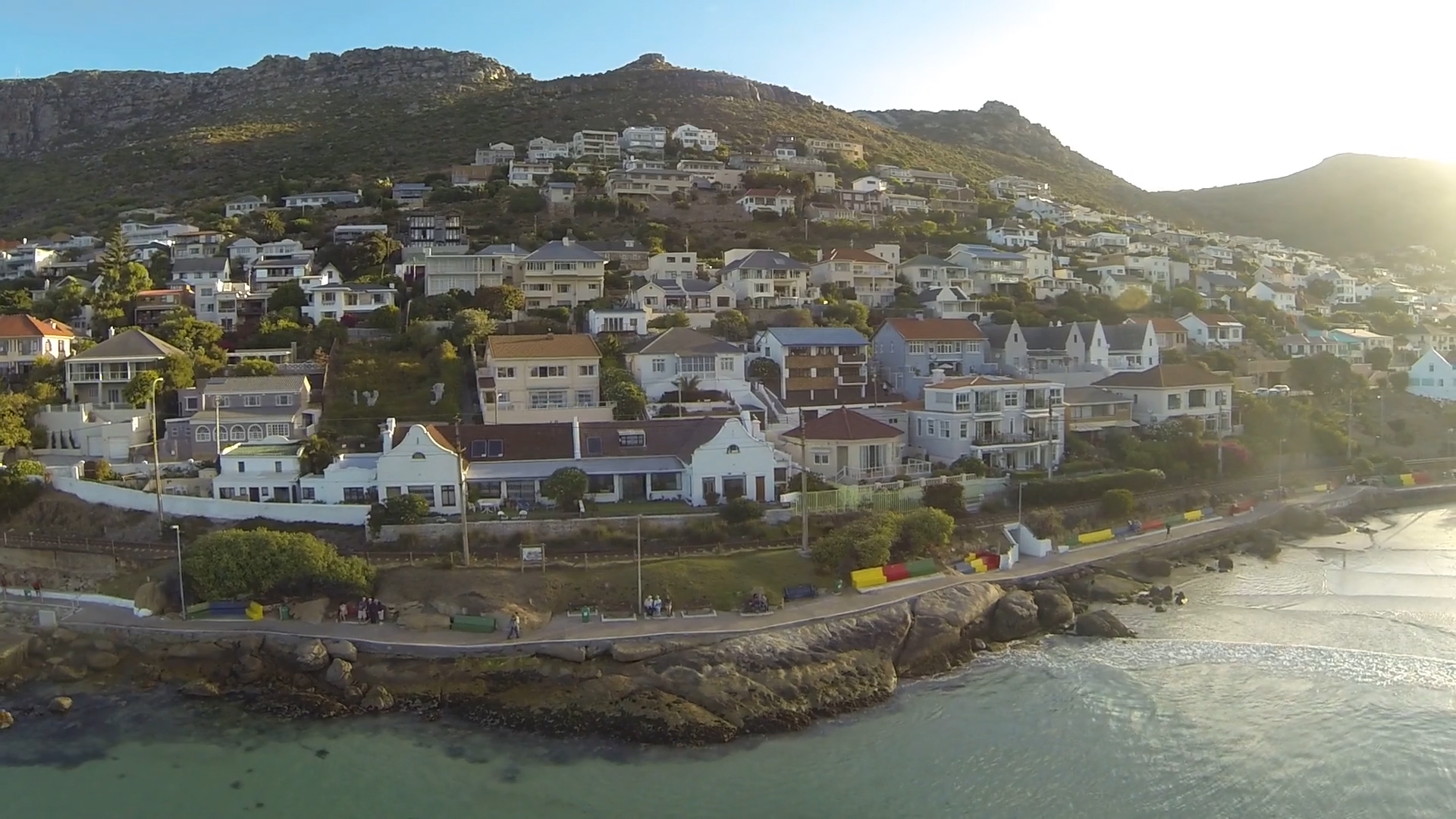
An aerial view from the ocean of the houses on the slopes in the southern part of Fish Hoek

Fish Hoek (Afrikaans: Vishoek, meaning either Fish Corner or Fish Glen) is a coastal suburb of Cape Town at the eastern end of the Fish Hoek Valley on the False Bay side of the Cape Peninsula in the Western Cape, South Africa. Previously a separate municipality, Fish Hoek is now part of the City of Cape Town.

== History ==
Fish Hoek, Vissers Baay or Visch Hoek appears on the earliest maps of the Cape.

Diplomat Edmund Roberts visited Fish Hoek in 1833. He described it as a "poor village" with a whaling industry.

The first grant of Crown land in Fish Hoek was granted to Andries Bruins in 1818. The land was sold several times before being bought by Hester Sophia de Kock in 1883. She was then a spinster of 51 years old. In 1901, late in life, she married a local farmer, one Jacob Isaac de Villiers, who came to live with her on the farm. Although she farmed wheat and vegetables, she started providing accommodation for people who wanted to stay in Fish Hoek, and so became the first local tourist entrepreneur. Having realized that Fish Hoek was becoming popular, she left instructions in her will that the farm was to be surveyed and the land sold as building plots.

After the deaths of Hester and Jacob, the land was sold off, the first sale taking place in 1918. The oldest house on the bay, now named Uitkyk, was bought as a fisherman's cottage in 1918 by the Mossop family of Mossop Leathers, and is still in the Mossop family. There had been a building on that site since the 1690s; a poshuis or post house and a whaling station office is all that is known of its history.

This was the beginning of the town of Fish Hoek. Initially people built holiday cottages, but as there was a good train service to Cape Town a more permanent community soon arose. By 1940 it was big enough to be declared a municipality and was administered by the Town Council until 1996. Hester and Isaac de Villiers, with other members of their family, are buried in the small graveyard next to the NG Kerk (Dutch Reformed Church) in Kommetjie Road. The farmhouse on the site of the present Homestead Naval Mess near the railway crossing became a hotel. The original building subsequently burned down in 1947.

After being part of the transitional South Peninsula Municipality from 1996 to 2000, Fish Hoek now falls under the City of Cape Town. Today Fish Hoek is regarded as a suburb of greater Cape Town and lies on the railway line from the central business district of that city to Simon's Town in the south.

== Geography ==
Fish Hoek is situated in a bay at the end of a broad, low valley, between two and three kilometres wide, which runs from east to west across the Cape Peninsula from Fish Hoek on the False Bay side to Noordhoek and Kommetjie on the Atlantic side. When sea levels were higher than they are today, the valley used to be a sea passage that separated the Cape Peninsula into northern and southern islands. The valley is generally sandy and the bedrock is Cape granite. In places this is deeply weathered and in the past the rotted granite was mined for pockets of the mineral kaolinite, which is used to make ceramic goods such as hand basins and bath tubs. The valley is famous for 12,000-year-old paleolithic skeletons discovered in a cave (now called Peers' Cave) by Bertie Peers and his father in 1927. Bertie Peers was a lover and explorer of the great outdoors, a fine amateur scientist and a dedicated naturalist but his enthusiasm eventually cost him his life, when he was fatally struck by a puff adder.

It is approximately 40 kilometres by road from Fish Hoek to Cape Town. Fish Hoek is connected to the city by two road routes: Main Road along the False Bay coast, and Ou Kaapse Weg which passes over the Steenberg mountains. Fish Hoek has a railway station which is served by Metrorail's Southern Line service, with journey times of about an hour to Cape Town and 15 minutes to Simon's Town.

=== Climate ===
Fish Hoek has a mild mediterranean climate and is spared over hot summer days by the south-easterly wind known locally as "the Cape Doctor". The mountains nearby are famous for large numbers of complex caves in sandstones of the Table Mountain Group. Caves are usually found in limestones and it is not common to find complex cave systems in pure sandstone.

== Parks and recreation ==
=== Fish Hoek beach ===
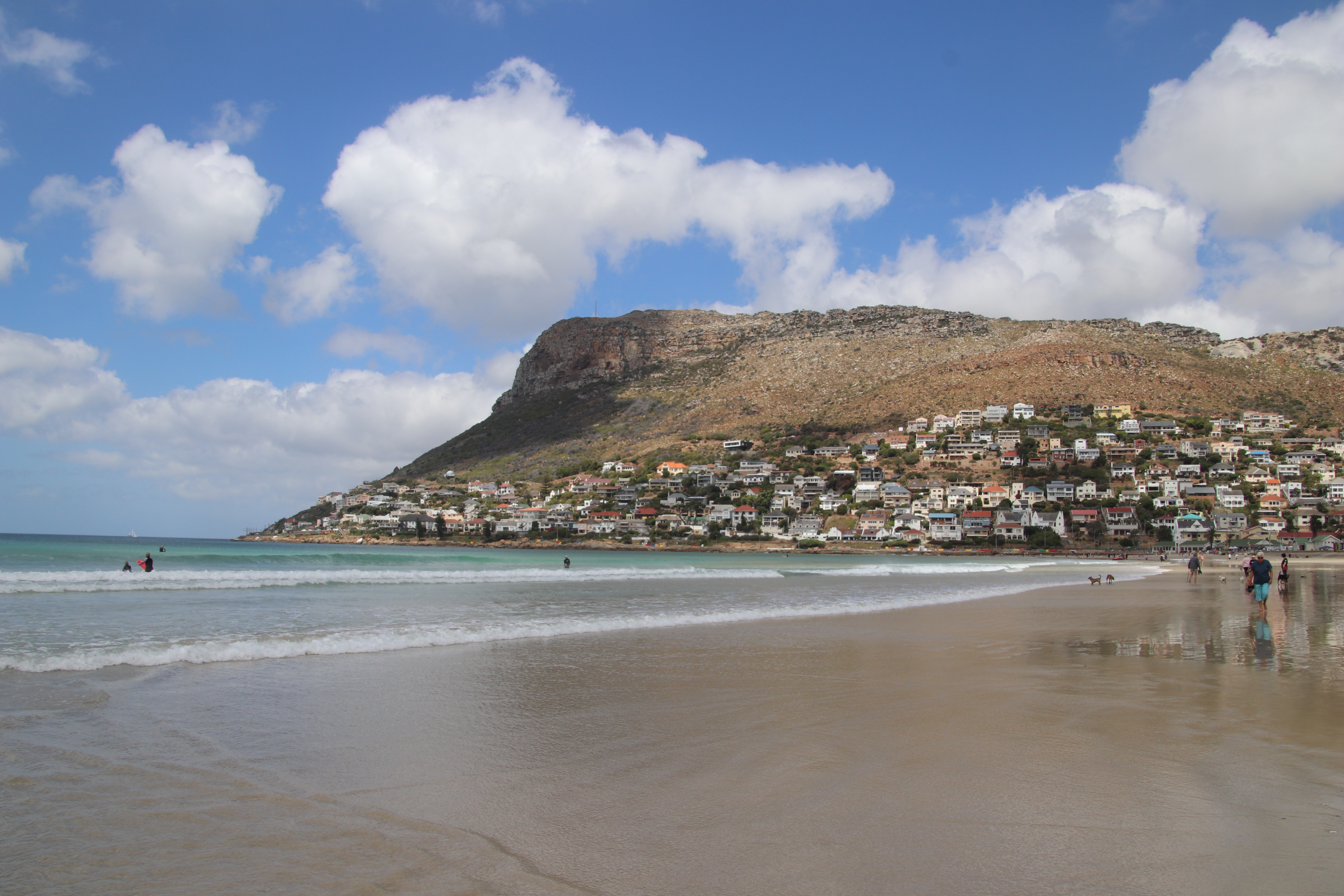
Fish Hoek Beach

The beach is about 1.5 kilometres (0.93 mi) long and quite flat, and the bay is protected from the currents and stronger surf in the rest of False Bay. Swimming is allowed along the entire beach with lifesavers on duty during the summer peak season, and body surfing, boogie boarding, wind surfing and surfski kayaking are popular. The water is far warmer than the Atlantic Seaboard, averaging between just under 17 °C (63 °F) annually (similar to Northern Mediterranean Waters like Monte Carlo or Nice, and peaking at 24 °C (75 °F) in summer months. Restaurants and children's play areas are situated at the southern end, and a path known as Jager Walk (also spelled Jaeger or Jagger, and known locally as the Cat Walk) runs past rock pools on the southern side of the bay.

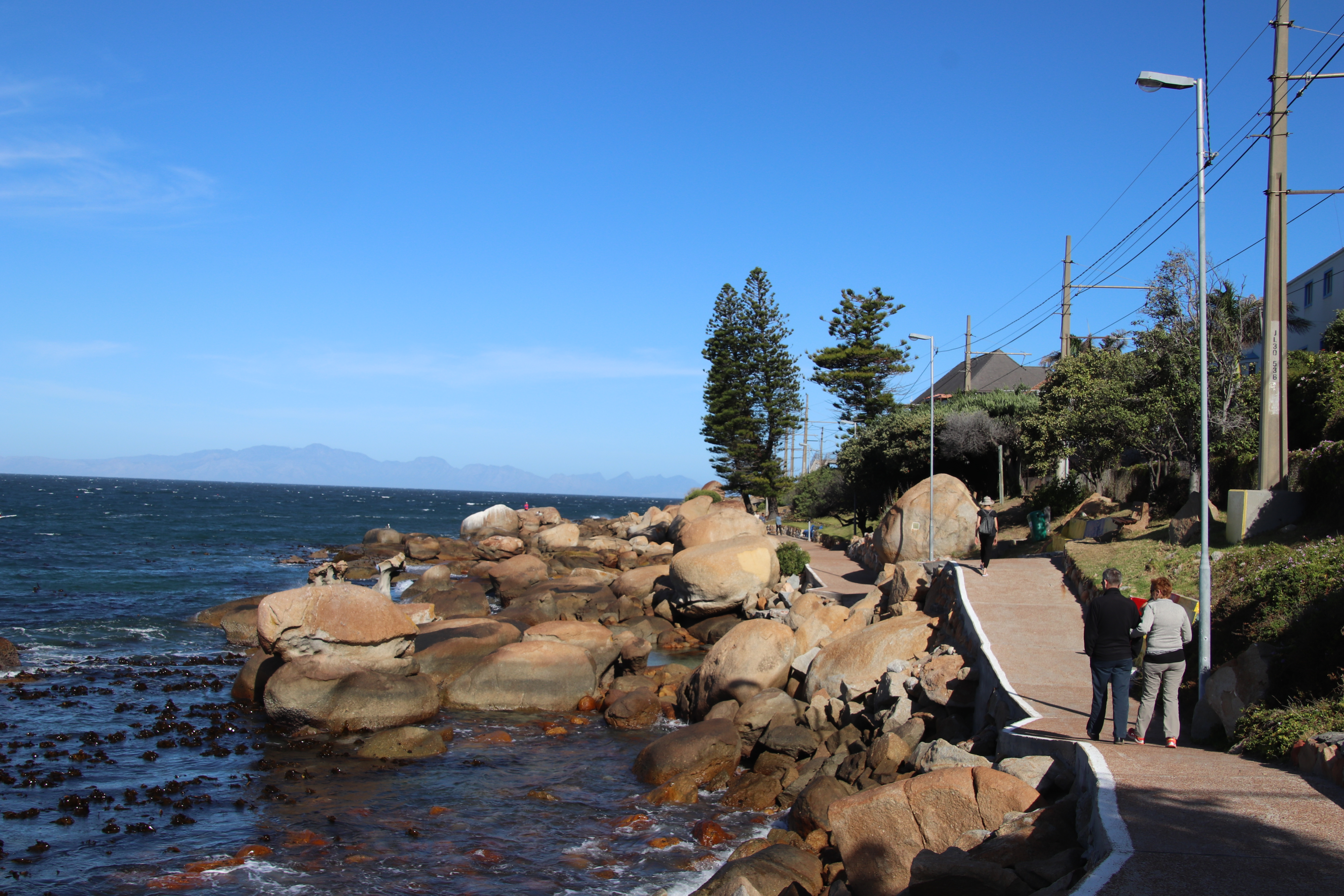
Jager Walk alongside the coastline

Shark spotters are often on duty, especially during the summer tourist season. Despite this, there have been two fatal encounters on swimmers in the bay in recent years, one in November 2004 and one in January 2010. On September 28, 2011, a 44-year-old British man Michael Cohen lost part of his leg after being bitten by a Great White shark, despite the beach being closed and shark flag flying. The northern parts of the beach are less developed, and are used by trek fishermen to launch their boats and clean nets. Seasonal visits from Southern Right Whales occur from June to November each year. There is also a shark net usually deployed in the early mornings.

== Education ==
Schools include Bay Primary, Fish Hoek Primary, Fish Hoek High School, Paul Greyling Primary, Sun Valley Primary, Silvermine Academy, The Rock Academy, Peak academy international school, iThemba School and EduExcellence private school. Although not in Fish Hoek, many travel to Star of the Sea Convent School, a historic primary school established in 1908. Fish Hoek Library is an active public library located conveniently at the Civic Centre Central Circle.

== Media ==
Fish Hoek and its surrounding suburbs are served by the local False Bay Echo newspaper, originally the Fish Hoek Echo, and the Peoples Post.

== Notable residents ==
- Colin Banton, cricketer
- Emile Baron, footballer
- Dawid Mocke, Lifeguard and surfski paddler
- Mike Bernardo, kickboxer and boxer
- Matthew Booth, footballer
- Nicola (Nikki) Mocke, Canoe Sprint Olympian and Lifeguard
- Fiona Coyne, actress and television presenter
- Paul Harris, cricketer
- Mavis Hutchison, Galloping Granny, long distance runner
- Marilyn Agliotti, Hockey Olympian, South Africa & Netherlands
- Sir Allan Mossop, Chief Judge of the British Supreme Court for China
- Richard Stanley, film director
- Matthew Mole, singer, songwriter
- Raymond Ackerman, founder Pick and Pay
- Eric Rosenthal (1905-1983), historian and journalist.

== Coat of arms ==
The Fish Hoek municipal council adopted a coat of arms, designed by R. McNee Tait, in April 1941.

The shield was gold, displaying a silver rampant lion behind a red horizontal stripe. The crest was an arm in armour, holding a sword, emerging from a coronet. The shield was supposed to represent Andries Bruins, while the crest was taken from the arms borne by some members of the De Villiers family. Whether Andries Bruins or Jacob de Villiers ever used these designs is unclear.
