= ICF Canoe Marathon Masters World Cup =

The ICF Canoe Marathon Masters World Cup are an international event in canoeing organized by the International Canoe Federation.

== Editions ==
#	Year	Host city	Host country	Events
1	2014	Oklahoma	United States	
2	2015	Győr	Hungary	
3	2016	Brandenburg	Germany	
4	2017	Pietermaritzburg	South Africa	
5	2018	Prado Vila Verde	Portugal	
