= Paddle Worldwide =

International canoeing governing body

- Abbreviation: PW
- Formation: 19 January 1924; 102 years ago
- Type: Sports federation
- Headquarters: Lausanne, Switzerland
- Region served: Worldwide
- President: Thomas Konietzko
- Main organ: Congress
- Affiliations: International Olympic Committee
- Website: paddleworldwide.com; canoeicf.com
- Formerly called: Internationale Repräsentantenschaft Kanusport (IRK) (19 January 1924–1946) International Canoe Federation (ICF) (1946–26 July 2026)

Paddle Worldwide (PW), formally known as the International Canoe Federation (ICF), is the umbrella organization of all national canoe organizations worldwide. It is headquartered in Lausanne, Switzerland, and administers all aspects of canoe sport worldwide. 175 countries are affiliated with Paddle Worldwide as of 2026.

== History ==
On 19 January 1924, six months before the Opening Ceremony in the French capital, the representatives of four National Federations - Austria, Denmark, Germany and Sweden - met in Copenhagen, Denmark and created the “Internationale Representantschaft für Kanusport” (IRK). With the intention to become the global governing body of canoeing, they chose Franz Reinicke from Germany as the first IRK President. It was renamed to the International Canoe Federation in 1946.

In light of the 2022 Russian invasion of Ukraine, the ICF suspended athletes from Russia and Belarus from competing at any International Canoe Federation events, and suspended all officials from Russia and Belarus from officiating at any event sanctioned by ICF, and from attending or taking part in any ICF meetings, committees, and forums. In March 2023, the Russian Canoe Federation sent a letter addressing the ISF and urging them to reverse the decision and allow Russian athletes to compete at ISF events. The RCF's statement included claims that the war was actually started by Ukraine and that "Russia defends peace". In May 2023, the International Canoe Federation reinstated Russian and Belarusian athletes, shortly after a Russian missile attack forced cancellation of a canoe event in Ukraine.

The ICF announced its rebranding as Paddle Worldwide with a press release on 26 July 2026.

== Disciplines ==
Flatwater

- Canoe sprint, formerly flatwater racing (World Championships since 1938)
- ICF Canoe Sprint Junior World Championships from 1985 to 2011
- ICF Canoe Sprint Junior & U23 World Championships from 2013
- ICF Masters Canoe Sprint World Championships
- Canoe marathon (World championships since 1988)
- ICF Masters Canoe Marathon World Championships
- ICF Canoe Marathon Masters World Cup
- Dragon boat
- Canoe polo (World Championships since 1994)
- Paracanoe
- Va'a

Ocean

- Canoe ocean racing (World Championships since 2013)
- Canoe sailing
- Waveski
- Surf ski - since 2010

Whitewater / Wildwater

- Canoe slalom, formerly slalom racing (World championships since 1949)
- Wildwater canoeing (World Championships since 1959)
- Canoe freestyle (formerly called playboating and before rodeo) (World championships since 2007)

Flatwater and Ocean

- Standup paddleboarding (SUP)
- ICF SUP World Championships from 2019 ICF Stand Up Paddling World Championships

== Executive Committee ==
- Thomas Konietzko, President
- Cecilia Farias, Vice President
- Lluis Rabaneda i Caselles, Vice President
- Luciano Buonfiglio, Vice President
- Li Xin, Treasurer
- Richard Pettit, Secretary General
- Maree Burnett, Oceania Canoe Association President
- Joao Manual Da Costa Alegre Afonso, Confederation of African Canoeing President
- Prashant Kushwaha, Asian Canoe Confederation President
- Jean Zoungrana, European Canoe Association President
- Sebastian Gomez, Pan American Canoe Federation President
- Toshi Furuya, Canoe Sprint Chair
- Richard Fox, Canoe Slalom Chair
- John Edwards, Paracanoe Chair
- Sebastian Brendel, Athlete Committee Chair

All members of the Executive Committee sit on the ICF Board of Directors.

== Membership ==
=== Continental associations ===
There are five continental associations affiliated with the ICF. These associations are responsible for organizing continental championships, providing support for their member federations and communicating their interests at the ICF Board meetings.

- Asian Canoe Confederation
- Confederation of African Canoe (Confederation Africaine de Canoe)
- Paddle Europe (European Canoe Association)
- Oceania Canoe Association
- Pan American Canoe Federation

== See also ==
- American Whitewater
- Association of Summer Olympic International Federations
- Canoe
- Kayak
- Paddle
- Surf ski
