= ICF Masters Canoe Marathon World Championships =

The ICF Masters Canoe Marathon World Championships are an international event in canoeing organized by the International Canoe Federation.

== Editions ==
#	Year	Host city	Host country	Events
1	2019	Shaoxing	China	
2	2021	Pitești	Romania	
3	2022	Ponte de Lima	Portugal	
4	2023	Vejen	Denmark	
5	2024	Metković	Croatia	
