= Dawid Mocke =

South African surf ski athlete

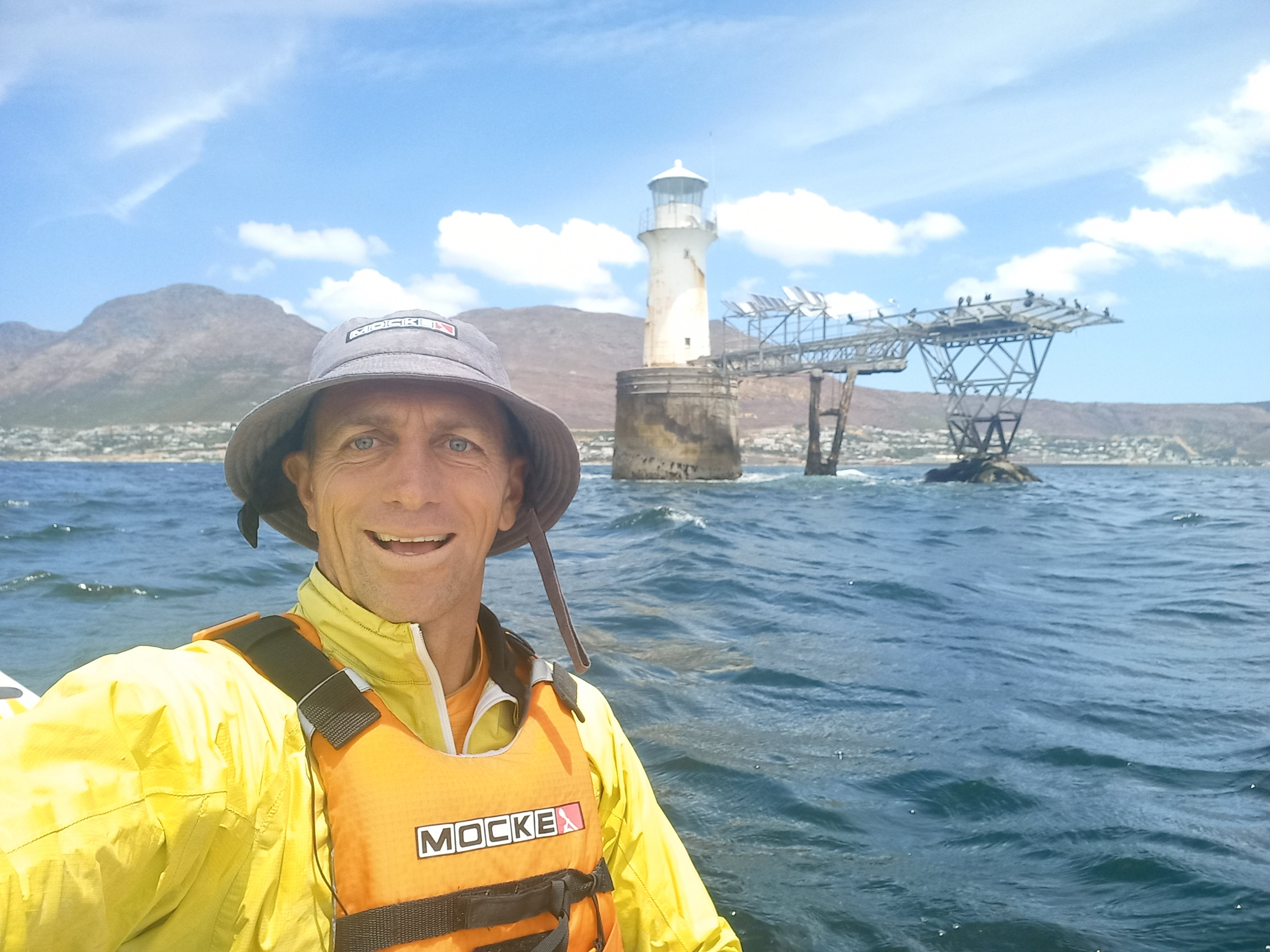
Dawid Mocke off the Roman Rock Lighthouse in Simonstown.

Dawid John Steyn Mocke (born 1 September 1977) is a South African surf ski athlete, entrepreneur and sports personality. During his athletic career he represented South Africa internationally and has won multiple World and South African surf ski and kayaking titles.

In 2010 Mocke and his brother Jasper won the SA Doubles Champs as well as the US Surfski Champs. In the same year he was named sportsman of the year at the Western Cape Provincial Sport Awards.

In 2014 Mocke and his brother Jasper won their 4th National Doubles Title.

== Notable Achievements ==
He started the world's first surf ski school in 2002 and launched a kayaking gear brand in 2012. In 2016 and 2017 he joined the Lewis Pugh Foundation Antarctica 2020 expeditions as a safety kayaker.

== National Teams ==
He represented South Africa in Surf lifesaving between 1999 and 2004; in Marathon Canoeing in 2001 (K2, Stockton on Tees) and recently in Ocean Racing, at the World Championships, Perth Australia.

Tri Nations ’99 Perth, Australia; 2003 New Zealand; World Lifesaving Champs 2004, Italy

World Marathon Canoeing Champs – 2001, England

World Canoe Ocean Racing Champs 2023 Perth Australia

== World Titles ==
In 2001 he started surfski kayaking and won four consecutive International World Surfski Series Titles between 2009 and 2012.

== Surfski Coaching ==
His career as a surfski athlete started as a coach. In 2002 Dawid and his wife Nikki Mocke founded the Surfski School as a means to teach and coach surfski paddling. Since starting the Surfski School he has contributed immensely to the growth and development of the sport worldwide.

In 2009 he produced a learn to surfski DVD.

In 2010 he contributed to the book Surfski with the Pro's.

In 2016 he authored the International Canoe Federation Surfski Coaching Manual.

== Summary of Achievements ==
4 x World Surfski Series Champion 2009, 2010, 2011, 2012

3 x South African Surfski Champion 2005, 2010, 2015

1 x Canadian Surfski Champion 2016

1 x Cape Town Downwind Champion 2015 (SA Champs)

3 x Pete Marlin Memorial Race Champion 2013, 2014, 2015

3 x Mauritius Ocean Classic Champion 2011, 2012, 2013

1 x “The Doctor” Perth (Australia’s premier Ocean Paddling event) Champion 2010

2 x Dubai Shamaal World’s Richest Surfski Race Champion 2006, 2007

1 x Durban World Cup Champion 2010

1 x Euro Challenge Europe’s Biggest Surfski race Champion 2010

5 x US Surfski Champion 2005, 2006, 2010, 2011, 2012

3 x Hong Kong Dragon Run Champion 2007, 2008, 2010

4 x Defis Kayak Champion Guadelope, Caribbean 2009, 2011, 2012, 2013

4 x King of the Harbour Auckland, New Zealand winner 2004, 2005, 2007, 2014

2 x Cape Point Challenge Champion 2005, 2009

5 x Scottburgh to Brighton Champion 04,05 (SA Champs), 09, 2010, 2011

10 x Summer Surfski Series Cape Town Champion

6 National Team South Africa Representation – 3 Surf lifesaving 1999, 2003, 2004, 4 Canoeing 2002, 2005-2007

South African Surf Lifesaving Champion - SA Lifesaving Victor Ludorum, 2005, Surfski Sprint Singles & Doubles, 2005, 2010, Paddleboard 1997, 2001, 2005
