= 2022 ISA World SUP and Paddleboard Championship =

- Venue: Condado Lagoon and San Juan Bay
- Location: San Juan, Puerto Rico
- Date: October 28 – November 6, 2022

The 2022 ISA World SUP and Paddleboard Championship took place in San Juan, Puerto Rico, from October 28 to November 6, 2022. The event was the 2022 world championships in standup paddleboarding (SUP) and paddleboarding, and was organized by the International Surfing Association (ISA).

== Medal summary ==
=== Medalists ===
==== Men ====
Event	Gold	Silver	Bronze
SUP Surfing	Luiz Diniz; Brazil	Benoit Carpentier; France	Zane Schweitzer; United States
SUP Racing; Technical	Shuri Araki; Japan	Noïc Garioud; France	Titouan Puyo; France
SUP Racing; Distance	Shuri Araki; Japan	Titouan Puyo; France	Michael Booth; Australia
SUP Racing; Sprint	Connor Baxter; United States	Noïc Garioud; France	David Leão; Brazil
Junior SUP Racing; Technical	Vaïc Garioud; France	Nariakira Shimazu; Japan	Campbell Carter; United States
Paddleboard Racing; Technical	Hunter Pflueger; United States	Julen Marticorena; France	Andrew Newton; New Zealand
Paddleboard Racing; Distance	Hunter Pflueger; United States	Julen Marticorena; France	David Buil; Spain

==== Women ====
Event	Gold	Silver	Bronze
SUP Surfing	Lucía Cosoleto; Argentina	Kaede Inoue; Japan	Aline Adisaka; Brazil
SUP Racing; Technical	Candice Appleby; United States	Esperanza Barreras; Spain	Mélanie Lafenêtre; France
SUP Racing; Distance	Duna Gordillo; Spain	Esperanza Barreras; Spain	Mélanie Lafenêtre; France
SUP Racing; Sprint	April Zilg; United States	Caroline Küntzel; Denmark	Mariecarmen Rivera; Puerto Rico
Junior SUP Racing; Technical	Cecilia Pampinella; Italy	Sonia Caimari; Spain	Soryn Preston; United States
Paddleboard Racing; Technical	Judit Vergés; Spain	Cornelia Rigatti; Italy	Yurika Horibe; Japan
Paddleboard Racing; Distance	Yurika Horibe; Japan	Judit Vergés; Spain	Cornelia Rigatti; Italy

==== Team ====
Event	Gold	Silver	Bronze
Team Relay	France; Julen Marticorena; Mélanie Lafenêtre; Thaïs Delrieux; Noïc Garioud	Japan; Takehiro Horibe; Yu Tachibana; Yurika Horibe; Shuri Araki	Spain; Carlos Alonso; Duna Gordillo; Judit Vergés; Manuel Hoyuela
Team Points	France	Spain	United States

=== Medal table ===
* Host nation (Puerto Rico)

Rank	Nation	Gold	Silver	Bronze	Total
1	United States (USA)	5	0	4	9
2	France (FRA)	3	6	3	12
3	Japan (JPN)	3	3	1	7
4	Spain (ESP)	2	5	2	9
5	Italy (ITA)	1	1	1	3
6	Brazil (BRA)	1	0	2	3
7	Argentina (ARG)	1	0	0	1
8	Denmark (DEN)	0	1	0	1
9	Australia (AUS)	0	0	1	1
9	New Zealand (NZL)	0	0	1	1
9	Puerto Rico (PUR)*	0	0	1	1
Totals (11 entries)		16	16	16	48

== See also ==
- 2022 ISA World Surfing Games
