= ICF Masters Canoe Sprint World Championships =

The ICF Masters Canoe Sprint World Championships are an international event in canoeing organized by the International Canoe Federation.

== Editions ==
Edition	Year	Host City	Host Country	Events
1	2019	Szeged	Hungary	
2	2022	Bydgoszcz	Poland	
3	2024	Plovdiv	Bulgaria	
