= Poenaiki Raioha =

French Polynesian surfer

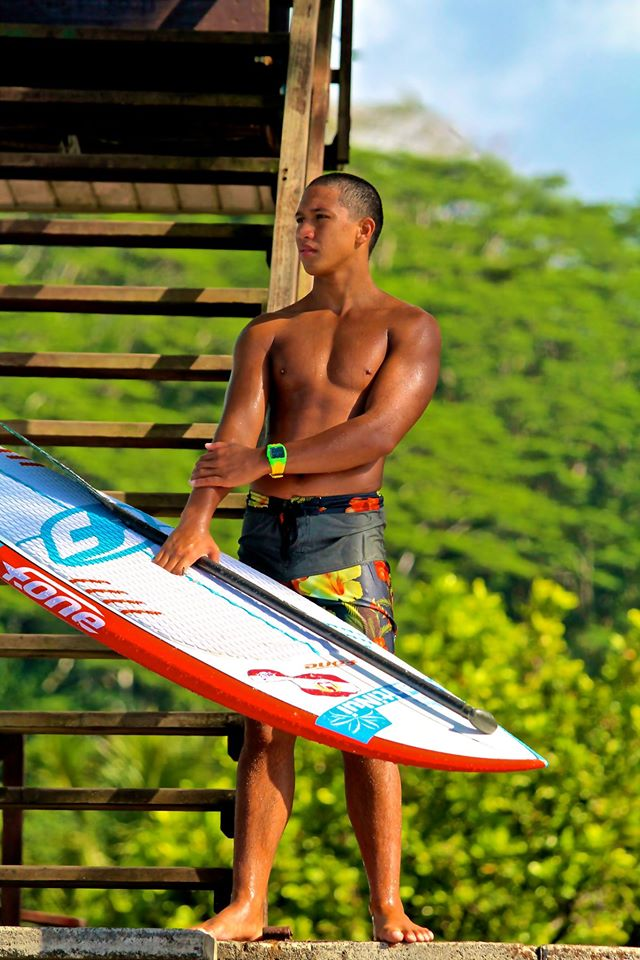
Poenaiki Raioha in 2015

Poenaiki Raioha (born 21 January 1997) is a French Polynesian surfer who specialises in the stand-up paddle.

Raioha was born in Papeete and educated at Samuel Raapoto high school. He learned to surf from an early age, along with his younger brother, and was trained by his grandfather and father.

In 2014 he became amateur world champion in stand up paddle at the 2014 World Surfing Games. In 2018 he came second in the world championships. In December 2019 he became pro world champion.

== Honours ==
In September 2014 he was made a knight of the Order of Tahiti Nui.
