= Caterina Stenta =

Italian windsurfer and Standup paddle athlete

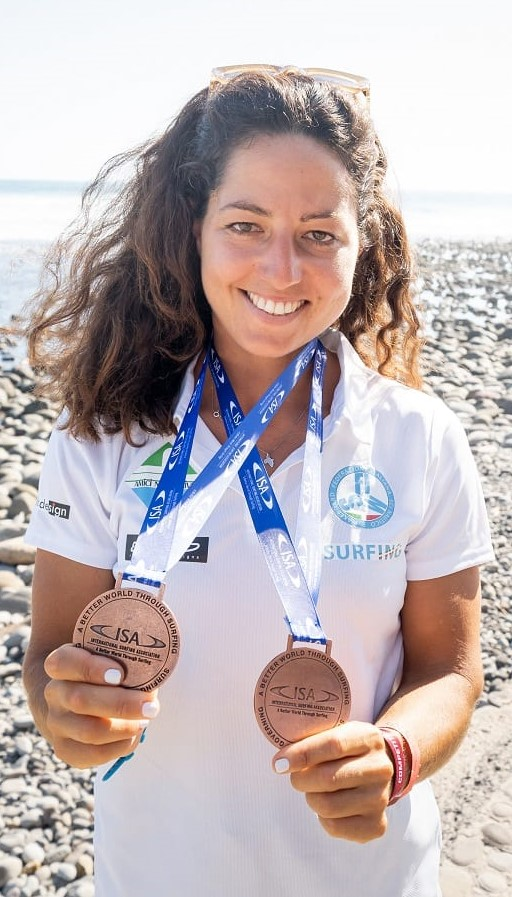
- Stenta at the 2019 ISA World Championships, in El Salvador

Personal information
- Born: 25 November 1987 (age 37); Trieste, Italy

Sport
- Sport: Windsurfing, standup paddleboarding

Caterina Stenta (born 25 November 1987 in Trieste, Italy) is a standup paddleboarding and windsurf athlete.

Stenta was Italian standup paddleboarding champion in 2017, 2018, and 2019. In 2018 she was second overall in the 200m sprint race at the ISA World SUP and Paddleboard Championship in Hainan, China and in 2019 she was third in the same discipline at the same event, this time in El Salvador. In windsurfing she has competed in the Professional Windsurfers Association (PWA) since 2013, in the wave discipline, where she was ranked 11th in 2014, 10th in 2015, 9th in 2016, 8th in 2017, 11th in 2018 and 6th in 2019.
