= Danielle McKenzie =

New Zealand canoeist

Personal information
- Nationality: New Zealand
- Born: 4 August 1994 (age 31) Auckland, New Zealand

Sport
- Country: New Zealand
- Sport: Canoeing, Surf lifesaving
Medal record
Canoe ocean racing
Representing New Zealand
World Championships
Gold medal – first place	2019 Saint-Pierre-Quiberon	SS1-WS
Silver medal – second place	2022 Viana do Castelo	SS1-WS

Danielle McKenzie (born 4 August 1994) is a New Zealand ocean racing canoeist and competitive surf lifesaver. In September 2019, she won the gold medal at the ICF Canoe Ocean Racing World Championships on her debut.
