= False Bay Echo =

The False Bay Echo is a local newspaper in the False Bay region of Cape Town, Western Cape, South Africa that has been in circulation since 1953.

== History and profile ==
The paper was started in 1953 under the title Fish Hoek Echo. In 1986 the paper was renamed as False Bay Echo.

It serves the coastal suburbs along the Western edge of False Bay, including Muizenberg, St. James, Kalk Bay, Fish Hoek, and Simon's Town. It is part of the Independent Newspapers group, which controls many of South Africa's daily newspapers.
