= Amandine Chazot =

French athlete (1991–2024)

Personal information
- Born: 1991; Brittany, France
- Died: 27 November 2024 (aged 33)

Sport
- Sport: Standup paddleboarder

Amandine Chazot (1991 – 27 November 2024) was a French radiologist and standup paddleboarder. She competed at the ISA World SUP and Paddleboard Championship and the ICF Stand Up Paddling World Championships.

== Early life ==
Chazot hailed from Brittany. She and her husband had a son.

== Career ==
Chazot studied medicine before becoming a radiologist at the Cornouaille hospital.

She was a two-time vice-world champion in stand-up paddler. She achieved these milestones at the International Surfing Association (ISA) world championships in Denmark in 2017 and El Salvador in 2019. She was a six-time champion in her home country. Paddleboarding is not considered a popular French sport, but Chazot reportedly contributed to popularising it on the coasts of Finistère.

In June 2024, she carried the Olympic flame during its passage before the 2024 Summer Olympics.

== Death ==
Chazot died from cancer on 27 November 2024, at the age of 33. She battled with cancer for many years. She had been undergoing treatment for advanced cancer since 2021.
