= ICF Stand Up Paddling World Championships =

Paddleboarding competition

ICF Stand Up Paddling World Championships is an International Canoe Federation competition in stand up paddling (SUP) in which athletes compete in technical and sprint races. The event is held annually and was first contested in 2019. There is a rival world championships in SUP held by the International Surfing Association.

== Editions ==
1. 2019: Qingdao, China
2. 2020: Cancelled (COVID-19)
3. 2021: Balatonfüred, Hungary
4. 2022: Gdynia, Poland
5. 2023: Pattaya, Thailand
6. 2024: Sarasota, United States
7. 2025: Abu Dhabi, United Arab Emirates
8. 2026: Sabaudia, Italy

== Medalists ==
=== Men ===
==== Technical race ====
Year	Gold	Silver	Bronze
2019	Lincoln Dews (AUS)	Connor Baxter (USA)	Ty Judson (AUS)
2021	Noïc Garioud (FRA)	Connor Baxter (USA)	Itzel Delgado (PER)
2022	Connor Baxter (USA)	Titouan Puyo (FRA)	Rai Taguchi (JPN)
2023	Connor Baxter (USA)	Itzel Delgado (PER)	Antonio Morillo (ESP)
2024	Noïc Garioud (FRA)	Shuri Araki (JPN)	Manuel Hoyuela (ESP)
2025	Aarón Sánchez (ESP)	Shuri Araki (JPN)	Rai Taguchi (JPN)
2026	Aarón Sánchez (ESP)	Noïc Garioud (FRA)	Connor Baxter (USA)

==== Sprint ====
Year	Gold	Silver	Bronze
2019	Connor Baxter (USA)	Claudio Nika (ITA)	Arthur Santacreu (BRA)
2021	Noïc Garioud (FRA)	Connor Baxter (USA)	Claudio Nika (ITA)
2022	Connor Baxter (USA)	Noïc Garioud (FRA)	Claudio Nika (ITA)
2023	Noïc Garioud (FRA)	Connor Baxter (USA)	Andrey Kraitor (BUL)
2024	Andrey Kraitor (BUL)	Manuel Hoyuela (ESP)	Cameron Tripney (RSA)
2025	Sergio Cantoral (ESP)	Vadim Korobov (LTU)	Andrey Kraitor (BUL)
2026	Vadim Korobov (LTU)	Sergio Cantoral (ESP)	Manuel Hoyuela (ESP)

==== Long distance ====
Year	Gold	Silver	Bronze
2019	Michael Booth (AUS)	Bruno Hasulyó (HUN)	Daniel Hasulyó (HUN)
2021	Titouan Puyo (FRA)	Noïc Garioud (FRA)	Daniel Hasulyó (HUN)
2022	Michael Booth (AUS)	Titouan Puyo (FRA)	Clément Colmas (FRA)
2023	Noïc Garioud (FRA)	Shuri Araki (JPN)	Rai Taguchi (JPN)
2024	Shuri Araki (JPN)	Noïc Garioud (FRA)	Eri Tenório (BRA)
2025	Shuri Araki (JPN)	Aarón Sánchez (ESP)	Rai Taguchi (JPN)
2026	Shuri Araki (JPN)	Aarón Sánchez (ESP)	Lluís Perotti (ESP)

==== Inflatable SUP ====
Year	Gold	Silver	Bronze
2019	Paolo Marconi (ITA)	Jonas Pauldrach (GER)	Martino Rogai (ITA)
2021	Andrey Kraitor (RUS)	Márton Kövér (HUN)	Christian Taucher (AUT)
2022	Michael Booth (AUS)	Paolo Marconi (ITA)	Normen Weber (GER)
2023	Michael Booth (AUS)	Andrey Kraitor (BUL)	Vincenzo Manobianco (ITA)
2024	Andrey Kraitor (BUL)	Normen Weber (GER)	Shimazu Nariakira (JPN)
2025	Andrey Kraitor (BUL)	Normen Weber (GER)	Ivan Shirshov (AIN)
2026	Augusto García (ESP)	Christian Andersen (DEN)	Zénó Szabó (HUN)

==== One-Design ====
Year	Gold	Silver	Bronze
2023	Andrey Kraitor (BUL)	Vincenzo Manobianco (ITA)	Liran Machlev (ICF)

=== Women ===
==== Technical race ====
Year	Gold	Silver	Bronze
2019	Olivia Piana (FRA)	Susak Molinero (ESP)	Fiona Wylde (USA)
2021	Fiona Wylde (USA)	Esperanza Barreras (ESP)	April Zilg (USA)
2022	Mélanie Lafenêtre (FRA)	Caroline Kuntzel (DEN)	Duna Gordillo (ESP)
2023	Esperanza Barreras (ESP)	Mélanie Lafenêtre (FRA)	Juliette DuHaime (ARG)
2024	Duna Gordillo (ESP)	Esperanza Barreras (ESP)	Rika Okuaki (JPN)
2025	Mariecarmen Rivera (PUR)	Duna Gordillo (ESP)	Alba Alonso (ESP)
2026	Mariecarmen Rivera (PUR)	Duna Gordillo (ESP)	Alba Alonso (ESP)

==== Sprint ====
Year	Gold	Silver	Bronze
2019	Olivia Piana (FRA)	Jessika Souza (BRA)	Tarryn King (RSA)
2021	Elena Prokhorova (RUS)	Natalia Novitskaya (RUS)	April Zilg (USA)
2022	April Zilg (USA)	Mélanie Lafenêtre (FRA)	Amandine Chazot (FRA)
2023	Seychelle Webster (USA)	Juliette DuHaime (ARG)	Tarryn King (RSA)
2024	Katniss Paris (USA)	Seychelle Webster (USA)	Alba Alonso (ESP)
2025	Mariecarmen Rivera (PUR)	Alba Alonso (ESP)	Seychelle Webster (USA)
2026	Cecilia Pampinella (ITA)	Mariecarmen Rivera (PUR)	Hanna Kamińska (POL)

==== Long distance ====
Year	Gold	Silver	Bronze
2019	Sonia Hönscheid (GER)	Olivia Piana (FRA)	Fiona Wylde (USA)
2021	Fiona Wylde (USA)	Esperanza Barreras (ESP)	Elena Prokhorova (RUS)
2022	Esperanza Barreras (ESP)	Duna Gordillo (ESP)	Mélanie Lafenêtre (FRA)
2023	Esperanza Barreras (ESP)	Kimberly Barnes (USA)	Duna Gordillo (ESP)
2024	Esperanza Barreras (ESP)	Mariecarmen Rivera (PUR)	Juliette DuHaime (ARG)
2025	Mariecarmen Rivera (PUR)	Duna Gordillo (ESP)	Alba Alonso (ESP)
2026	Virág Csillag-Kocsis (HUN)	Esperanza Barreras (ESP)	Duna Gordillo (ESP)

==== Inflatable SUP ====
Year	Gold	Silver	Bronze
2019	Noémi Horváth (HUN)	Esti Froimovici (ISR)	Anastacia Pavlova (RUS)
2021	Olivia Piana (FRA)	Émilie Fournel (CAN)	Noémi Horváth (HUN)
2022	Danielle Holdsworth (CAN)	Nóra Kövér (HUN)	Esti Froimovici (ISR)
2023	Lim Su-jeong (KOR)	Kim Young-mi (KOR)	Aidah Sitianingsih (INA)
2024	Lim Su-jeong (KOR)	Daria Zaitseva (AIN)	Olga Merkulova (AIN)
2025	Lim Su-jeong (KOR)	Lee Jo-chi (TPE)	Xu Haoting (CHN)
2026	Vira Lemekha (ITA)	Eszter Nagy-Rasztótsky (HUN)	Loretta Pihelevics (HUN)

==== One-Design ====
Year	Gold	Silver	Bronze
2023	Edwina Woo (SIN)	Lim Su-jeong (KOR)	Georgia Evangelidi (GRE)
