= ICF Canoe Ocean Racing World Championships =

International event involving long distance surf ski ocean races

The ICF Canoe Ocean Racing World Championships are an international event involving long distance surf ski ocean races. Races are divided into single-paddler (SS1) senior, junior and masters age-group categories. The Championships have been held every two years since debuting in 2013, then switched into being held annually since 2021.

== Editions ==
- 2013: Vila do Conde, Portugal
- 2015: Tahiti, French Polynesia
- 2017: Hong Kong
- 2019: Saint-Pierre-Quiberon, France
- 2021: Lanzarote, Spain
- 2022: Viana do Castelo, Portugal
- 2023: Perth, Australia
- 2024: Madeira, Portugal
- 2025: Durban, South Africa
- 2026: Villajoyosa, Spain

== Medalists ==
=== Senior medalists ===
Senior category medalists are listed below:

==== SS1-MS - Surf Ski Men Senior ====
Year	Gold	Silver	Bronze
2013	Sean Rice (RSA)	Cory Hill (AUS)	Sam Norton (AUS)
2015	Cory Hill (AUS)	Clint Robinson (AUS)	Jasper Mocke (RSA)
2017	Cory Hill (AUS)	Hank McGregor (RSA)	Jasper Mocke (RSA)
2019	Sean Rice (RSA)	Kenneth Rice (RSA)	Cory Hill (AUS)
2021	Nicolas Notten (RSA)	Gordan Harbrecht (GER)	Ulvard Hart (RSA)
2022	Kenneth Rice (RSA)	Hank McGregor (RSA)	Mackenzie Hynard (AUS)
2023	Cory Hill (AUS)	Joshua Fenn (RSA)	Oscar Jones (AUS)
2024	Gordan Harbrecht (GER)	Cory Hill (AUS)	Hank McGregor (RSA)
2025	Cory Hill (AUS)	Pierre Vilella (FRA)	Nicholas Notten (RSA)
2026	Gordan Harbrecht (GER)	Pierre Vilella (FRA)	Cory Hill (AUS)

==== SS1-WS - Surf Ski Women Senior ====
Year	Gold	Silver	Bronze
2013	Michele Eray (RSA)	Michelle Burn (RSA)	Nikki Mocke (RSA)
2015	Teneale Hatton (NZL)	Michele Eray (Note: Eray previously represented South Africa) (USA)	Rachel Clarke (NZL)
2017	Hayley Nixon (RSA)	Michelle Burn (RSA)	Teneale Hatton (NZL)
2019	Danielle McKenzie (NZL)	Hayley Nixon (RSA)	Teneale Hatton (NZL)
2021	Michelle Burn (RSA)	Katriana Swetish (USA)	Judit Vergés (ESP)
2022	Jemma Smith (AUS)	Danielle McKenzie (NZL)	Michelle Burn (RSA)
2023	Jemma Smith (AUS)	Melanie van Niekerk (RSA)	Brianna Massie (AUS)
2024	Michelle Burn (RSA)	Melanie van Niekerk (RSA)	Judit Vergés (ESP)
2025	Kira Bester (RSA)	Danielle McKenzie (NZL)	Judit Vergés (ESP)
2026	Jemma Smith (AUS)	Kira Bester (RSA)	Rosie Edwards (GBR)

==== SS2-XS - Surf Ski Mixed Senior ====
Year	Gold	Silver	Bronze
2023	Judit Vergés, Walter Bouzán (ESP)	Mackenzie Hynard, Jemma Smith (AUS)	Kira Bester, Mark Keeling (RSA)
2024	Víctor Rodríguez, Chloe Bunnett (ESP)	Walter Bouzán, Judit Vergés (ESP)	Matthew Fenn, Saskia Hockly (RSA)
2025	Matthew Fenn, Saskia Hockly (RSA)	Thaïs Delrieux, Hector Henot (FRA)	Jenna Nisbet, Hamish Lovemore (RSA)
2026	Jemma Smith, Cory Hill (AUS)	Jade Wilson, Hank McGregor (RSA)	Robert Hart, Georgia Singe (RSA)

=== U23 medalists ===
U23 category medalists are listed below:

==== SS1 Men U23 ====
Year	Gold	Silver	Bronze
2013	Grant Walt (RSA)	Brandon Walt (RSA)	Michael Booth (AUS)
2015	Mackenzie Hynard (AUS)	Kenneth Rice (RSA)	Joey Hall (AUS)
2017	Kenneth Rice (RSA)	Mackenzie Hynard (AUS)	Valentin Henot (FRA)
2019	Joshua Fenn (RSA)	Hector Henot (FRA)	Noah Havard (AUS)
2021	Ulvard Hart (RSA)	Jorge Enríquez (ESP)	Pierre Vilella (FRA)
2022	Ulvard Hart (RSA)	Joshua Fenn (RSA)	Bernardo Pereira (POR)
2023	Matthew Fenn (RSA)	Ulvard Hart (RSA)	Bernardo Pereira (POR)
2024	Matthew Fenn (RSA)	Bernardo Pereira (POR)	Ulvard Hart (RSA)
2025	Bernardo Pereira (POR)	Lanee Marin (FRA)	Pablo St Mary (ESP)
2026	Barnardo Pereira (POR)	Lanee Marin (FRA)	Levi Mayes (RSA)

==== SS1 Women U23 ====
Year	Gold	Silver	Bronze
2013	Teneale Hatton (NZL)	Mouden Angie (FRA)	Bianca Beavitt (RSA)
2015	Jenna Ward (RSA)	Georgia Laird (AUS)	Jamie Brinkworth (AUS)
2017	Linnea Stensils (SWE)	Kyéta Purchase (RSA)	Laury Marie-Sainte (FRA)
2019	Jemma Smith (AUS)	Brianna Massie (AUS)	Kyéta Purchase (RSA)
2021	Jade Wilson (RSA)	Róisín Cahill (IRL)	Irene Gana (ESP)
2022	Katriana Swetish (USA)	Kira Bester (RSA)	Róisín Cahill (IRL)
2023	Kira Bester (RSA)	Katriana Swetish (USA)	Saskia Hockly (RSA)
2024	Kira Bester (RSA)	Katriana Swetish (USA)	Saskia Hockly (RSA)
2025	Rosie Edwards (GBR)	Georgia Singe (RSA)	Jade Wilson (RSA)
2026	Rosie Edwards (GBR)	Saskia Hockly (RSA)	Georgia Singe (RSA)

==== SS2 Mixed U23 ====
Year	Gold	Silver	Bronze
2023	Patrick Eley, Jasmine Locke (AUS)	Sara Mengual, Jorge Enríquez (ESP)	Claire Dewaste, Marin Lanée (FRA)
2024	Georgia Singe, Ulvard Hart (RSA)	Bernardo Pereira, Ana Brito (POR)	Pablo St Mary, Sara Mengual (ESP)
2025	Holly Shirley Smith, Heath Clarke (RSA)	Sara Mengual Francisco, Pablo St Mary Palmero (ESP)	Margaux Bouteloup, Tanguy Cattelle (FRA)
2026	Holly Smith, Samuel Mocke (RSA)	Nicola Harcus, David Coetzer (RSA)	Sara Mengual, Josep Cifre (ESP)

=== Junior medalists ===
Junior category medalists are listed below:

==== SS1 Men Junior ====
Year	Gold	Silver	Bronze
2013	Kenneth Rice (RSA)	Nicolas Notten (RSA)	Gene Prato (RSA)
2015	Mark Keeling (RSA)	Hector Henot (FRA)	Fergus Morgan (AUS)
2017	Oscar Jones (AUS)	Hector Henot (FRA)	Noah Havard (AUS)
2019	Ulvard Hart (RSA)	Jorge Enríquez (ESP)	Matthew Fenn (RSA)
2021	Bernardo Pereira (POR)	Joshua Smith (RSA)	Oleksandr Bobusky (POR)
2022	Joshua Smith (RSA)	Marin Lanée (FRA)	Matthew Coetzer (RSA)
2023	Mathis Roudaut (FRA)	Alex Woodhouse (AUS)	Heath Clarke (RSA)
2024	Sam Mocke (RSA)	Heath Clarke (RSA)	Terry Michael (GBR)
2025	Samuel Mocke (RSA)	Gwendal Stephan (FRA)	Julian St Mary (ESP)
2026	Samuel Mocke (RSA)	Keegan Vogt (RSA)	Ryley Smith (RSA)

==== SS1 Women Junior ====
Year	Gold	Silver	Bronze
2013	Kirsten Flanagan (RSA)	Catarina Santos (POR)	Jamie Brinkworth (AUS)
2017	Sabina Lawrie (RSA)	Georgia Sinclair (AUS)	Zara Wood (RSA)
2019	Katriana Swetish (USA)	Jazmin Shipway-Carr (AUS)	Claire Dewaste (FRA)
2021	Saskia Hockly (RSA)	Claire Dewaste (FRA)	Valma Jean Hockly (RSA)
2022	Saskia Hockly (RSA)	Holly Smith (RSA)	Jasmine Rayward (AUS)
2023	Holly Smith (RSA)	Lara Cellier (ESP)	Alyssa Bailey (AUS)
2024	Georgia Singe (RSA)	Holly Smith (RSA)	Lara Cellier (ESP)
2025	Andrea Jiménez Colmard (ESP)	Ellen Strydom (RSA)	Constança Frazão (POR)
2026	Andrea Jimenez (ESP)	Isabella Strydom (RSA)	Diana Hernandez (ESP)

==== SS2 Mixed Junior ====
Year	Gold	Silver	Bronze
2023	Alyssa Bailey, Ziko Vesely (AUS)	Lara Cellier, Enrique García (ESP)	Holly Smith, Heath Clarke (RSA)
2024	Holly Smith, Ryley Smith (RSA)	Pablo Rosco, Lara Cellier (ESP)	Asier Aizpurua, Nur Hachawi (ESP)
2025	Ryley Michael Smith, Ellen Strydom (RSA)	Ariadne Gimenez Aguilar, Pau Sanchez Such (ESP)	Madison Fourie, Matthew Coetzer (RSA)
2026	Hanna Solomon, Keegan Vogt (RSA)	Andrea Jimenez, Julian Stmary (ESP)	Isabella Strydom, Ryley Smith (RSA)
