= Surf ski =

Light boat that is paddled

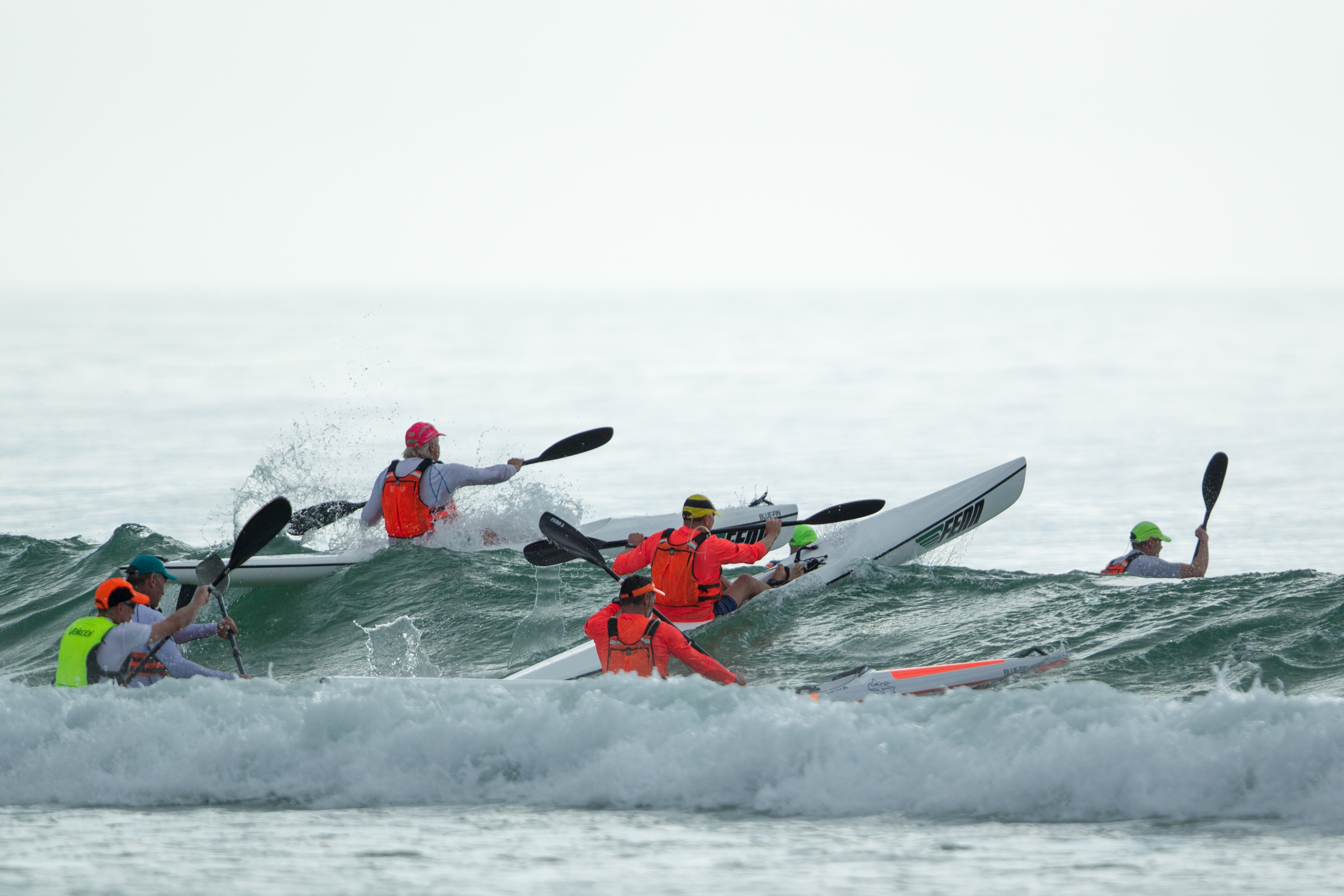
A group of surfski paddlers paddle through the surf zone

A surf ski (or surfski, or surf-ski) is a type of kayak. It is generally the longest of all kayaks and is a performance oriented kayak designed for speed on open water, most commonly the ocean, although it is well suited to all bodies of water and recreational paddling.

The most common use of surfskis is in surf lifesaving competitions and downwind paddling.

Surfski paddling has become a pastime for water sports enthusiasts due to its open water capabilities, speed, and versatility.

A surfski uses an open "sit-on-top" (SOT) cockpit and not an enclosed cockpit that requires a splash cover, or spray deck, such as olympic flatwater sprint kayaks, white-water or slalom kayaks, or touring kayaks. Many surfski models use a self-bailer to eliminate water in the cockpit area. The sit-on-top cockpit means a surfski is easy to remount in the event of a capsize and also that the hull will not fill with water.

Surfskis are steered by foot-controlled pedals connected to a stern rudder. Their performance design and steering system makes it possible to paddle onto and ride open water wind swells on the ocean and other large bodies of water

The modern day version of the surfski originated in the surf lifesaving movement as a means to assist swimmers in distress. As the sport of lifesaving began to develop out of the lifesaving movement, surfski paddling became one of the hallmark events of being a fit, competent lifeguard. Surfski paddling is still incorporated into a number of lifesaving events and is a well established discipline in surf lifesaving.

In the 1950s lifeguards began holding stand alone, long distance surfski races. These races were only raced by qualified lifesavers. In the 1970s the first "open" surfski races began appearing, most notably the "Molokai Challenge" in Hawaii. In the mid-1990s the sport started becoming more widely adopted outside of surf lifesaving with the first non-affiliated series of races being organised in Cape Town, South Africa by BiIlly Harker. At the same time a series of non-affiliated races was organised in Sydney, Australia by Dean Gardiner.

In 2004 the first I.C.F (International Canoe Federation) World Cup was held in Cape Town, South Africa

In 2006 the first World Surfski Series was held.

In 2013, nearly 10 years after the first I.C.F world Cup in Cape Town, the International Canoe Federation hosted their inaugural World Championship in Vila do Conde, Porto, Portugal.

== Characteristics ==
There are two types of surfskis, the spec ski and the ocean ski. The spec ski is the traditional craft used by surf life saving clubs and must adhere to strict size and weight. The ocean ski on the other hand is typically a longer craft with a deeper cockpit. The spec ski is built more solidly and with more rocker to manoeuvre in and out of the wave zone. The ocean ski is made for long-distance ocean paddling and is usually raced downwind with the swells. Typically 5.0-6.0 metres (16½-21 ft) long and only 40–50 cm (16-20") wide, surfskis are extremely fast when paddled on flat water and they are the fastest paddled craft available over a long distance on ocean swells. They track well but are less manoeuverable and have less transverse primary (and sometimes less secondary) stability than shorter, wider craft. Despite its typical instability, a surfski (with an experienced paddler) is a very effective craft for paddling in big surf. Its narrowness and length helps it cut or punch through large broken waves. Double-bladed paddles are used, often with highly contoured wing blades for extra efficiency.

A waveski is different from a surfski, more similar to a surf board, and used primarily in surf play. It is usually less than 3 m (10 ft) long, typically with a wide planing type bottom and with one to three fixed skegs, or fins.

== Current use ==
Surfskis are used worldwide for surf lifesaving, wave surfing and for training and competition on flat-water or ocean (downwind) racing. They are most popular in warmer coastal regions where the sport originated such as Australia, South Africa, New Zealand and Hawaii; however the versatility of surfski as a kayaking discipline has made it a very popular choice for paddlers worldwide especially in the Nordic regions, Western Europe, the Pacific Northwest and the East Coast of the US.

Many enjoy paddling surfskis as an outdoor water sport for what it offers in terms of fitness, competition and adventure. Surfskiers will paddle regularly, at high intensity, often in races, and as often as possible to ride waves.

== Construction and design ==
Some less expensive, heavier surfskis are made from polyethylene. Such plastic boats can absorb much greater abuse and can be more practical for river running, playing in shore breaks, or paddling anywhere with shallows and likely boat scraping. Light weight surfskis are made of composite layers of epoxy or polyester resin-bonded cloth: fibreglass, kevlar, carbon fibre or a mixture. To cut weight, the number of layers of the material and the amount of resin may be minimised to just that necessary for structural integrity or increased for extra strength and durability in heavy surf.

Early surfskis were constructed in the same way as early surfboards, being laminated from light wood and sometimes covered with fabric. In the 1960s, the first foam surfboards and surfskis were carved from a single block of expanded polystyrene foam, strengthened with wooden stringers and covered with a thin layer of fibreglass. As the demand for surfskis grew in the 1970s, this custom method of production proved too costly and moulds were made from the most successful surfskis so that moulded craft could be made more cost effectively out of glass-fibre. At the same time, there was a divergence in ski design, one type becoming known as the lifesaving specification surfski (spec ski) and the other being the long distance or ocean racing surfski.

Ocean racing surfskis differ from spec skis in that they are longer, have sharply pointed bows and under stern rudders. The front of the modern lifesaving type surfski is often flared to prevent nose diving on returning to shore when surfing down large steep waves. Ocean racing surfskis are also usually longer than long distance racing kayaks; they have more longitudinal curvature (rocker); they typically have less transverse primary and secondary stability but more longitudinal stability because the paddler is seated more towards the centre of the craft to enhance wave riding ability. An ocean racing surfski must have enough volume in the bow to provide buoyancy when punching through surf, a long waterline to make use of ocean swells, a sleek, narrow shape to reduce water resistance, as well as enough stability to make paddling in rough conditions feasible.

== History ==
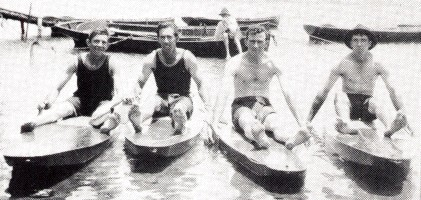
Harry McLaren, the first maker of surfskis, second from the left, with Ray Dick, Herb Reckless and Bert McLaren, left to right. 1919 on the Hastings River, Port Macquarie

Harry McLaren and his brother Jack used an early version of the surfski in 1912 around the family's oyster beds on Lake Innes, near Port Macquarie, New South Wales, Australia, and the brothers used them in the surf on Port Macquarie's beaches. The board was propelled in a sitting position with two small hand blades, which was probably not a highly efficient method to negotiate the surf. The deck was flat with a bung plug at the rear and a nose ring with a leash, possibly originally required for mooring. The rails were square and there was pronounced rocker. The board's obvious buoyancy indicates hollow construction, with thin boards of cedar fixed longitudinally down the board.

Surfskis were later used by lifesavers to rescue drowning swimmers. Until the 1960s, surf boats—lightweight rowing boats with a crew of five—were responsible for the rescue work in and behind the surf line. These boats were expensive and required a huge amount of skill to be used effectively. It was soon realised that a double surfski could do almost everything that a surf boat could do, and in 1946 the importance of surfskis was noted by the surf lifesaving associations and they were included in lifesaving competitions and championships. Riders could stand up on them to surf them back to shore. These early surfskis were very wide and bear little resemblance to their modern counterparts. Over time they became narrower to maximise speed.

In Britain in the eighties there were also short boats called "surfskis" that developed from surf kayaks and were made by Frank Goodwin of Valley Canoe Products and UK surfskis in south Wales. They were part of a surf canoeing discipline managed by the British Canoe Union. Then in the late 1980s paddlers surfing with these short skis separated from BCU to form the British wave ski assn.

In 1984, waveski surfing became established as an offshoot of surfskiing with the formation of the World Waveski Surfing Association.

In the television series Magnum, P.I., the character Thomas Magnum was often seen on a surfski.

=== Competition ===
==== Surf lifesaving ====
The surfski is used in surf lifesaving competitions all over the world including Australia, Canada, New Zealand, South Africa, the United States and in Europe. Since its introduction, surfski racing has been managed by the International Life Saving Federation (ILS). The standard ILS surfski race is about 700m, from a start in the water, out around a series of buoys and back to the beach. Events include:

- Surfski
- Surf race
- Paddle board
- Ski relay
- Taplin relay
- Oceanman (new name since ILS Rulebook 2007, in history it is Ironman)

==== Open ocean racing ====
===== Lifeguards only =====
It was not long before lifesavers began going further offshore in these new, extremely seaworthy craft, and ocean racing began to emerge. The first standalone surfski race to be held was in 1958 in Durban, South Africa, known as the Pirates-Umhlanga-Pirates, a 20 km out and back race. The race continues to this day. The second oldest race happened the same year when lifesavers raced from Scottburgh to Brighton in South Africa, a 46 km event first held in 1958.

Other stand alone long distance surfski races started under the surf lifesaving movement include:

- The Port Elizabeth to East London in South Africa, a 240 km event held every two years since 1972
- The Cape Point Challenge, a 52 km race around the famous Cape of Good Hope
- The Mouth to Mouth Surfski Challenge - From Richards Bay to Mtunzini since 1994, 40 km

To be eligible to compete in these events one had to be a qualified and currently active lifeguard, doing voluntary duties and competing for a lifesaving club.

===== Independent and open to anyone =====
The first independent open ocean surfski race, where entries were open to anyone and not only to qualified lifesavers was the most famous Molokai race in Hawaii, a 60 km event first held in 1976. It is for this reason that The Molokai is also considered the unofficial World Championships of ocean ski racing.

In the mid-1990s the sport started becoming more widely adopted outside of surf lifesaving with the first non-affiliated series of races being organised in Cape Town, South Africa by Billy Harker. At the same time a series of non-affiliated races was organised in Sydney, Australia by Dean Gardiner.

There are now major surfski races held all over the world.

== Popular surfski destinations ==
More recently, there has been a huge growth in ocean surfski racing in mainland USA, Australia, New Zealand and other Pacific countries.

As well as ocean racing, surfskis are becoming increasingly popular as a versatile racing craft for open class races that take place in sheltered bays, lakes and rivers. One advantage of the surfski over the traditional kayak is that if the conditions tip the paddler into the water, a "wet entry" is possible by simply climbing back onto the boat and continuing paddling without first having to drain the boat of water. One of the most popular inland race venues that reliably provides ocean-like, surfable waves is the Columbia River along the stretch of river (in the "Gorge") around Hood River that is also enormously popular for wind sports on water.

Fish Hoek, South Africa, is a notable destination for surfski paddling, attracting both local and international participants. The area offers paddling conditions throughout much of the year and supports a large paddling community from across the Cape Town region. Numerous paddling routes are available from Fish Hoek Bay, the most prominent being the Millers Run, a 12-kilometre downwind route between Millers Point in Simon's Town and Fish Hoek Beach. Depending on wind conditions, Fish Hoek serves either as the finish point during southeasterly winds or the starting point during northwesterly winds. The route is widely regarded as one of the most well-known and frequently used downwind surfski courses in the world.

== Notable competitors ==
- Oscar Chalupsky
- Grant Kenny
- Clint Robinson
- Dawid Mocke
- Michele Eray
- Greg Barton
- Hank Mcgregor
