= List of ICF Canoe Marathon World Championships medalists in men's canoe =

This is a list of medalists from the ICF Canoe Marathon World Championships in men's canoe.

== C-1 ==
Debuted: 1988.

Championships	Gold	Silver	Bronze
1988 Nottingham	Pál Pétervári (HUN)	Gábor Kolozsvári (HUN)	Stig Jeppesen (DEN)
1990 Copenhagen	Stig Jepsen (DEN)	Pál Pétervári (HUN)	Jiří Vrdlovec (CZE)
1992 Brisbane	Stig Jepsen (DEN)	Pál Pétervári (HUN)	Jiří Vrdlovec (CZE)
1994 Amsterdam	Arne Nielsen (DEN)	Gábor Kolozsvári (HUN)	Karsten Scales (DEN)
1996 Vaxholm	Arne Nielsen (DEN)	Karsten Scales (DEN)	Pál Pétervári (HUN)
1998 Cape Town	Pál Pétervári (HUN)	Gábor Kolozsvári (HUN)	Jose Sousa (POR)
1999 Győr	Pál Pétervári (HUN)	Pavel Bednář (CZE)	Gábor Kolozsvári (HUN)
2000 Dartmouth	Karsten Scales (DEN)	Pavel Bednář (CZE)	Pál Pétervári (HUN)
2001 Stockton-on-Tees	Pavel Bednář (CZE)	Pál Pétervári (HUN)	Pedro Areal (ESP)
2002 Zamora	Pavel Bednář (CZE)	Léo Dubois-Dunilac (FRA)	Pedro Areal (ESP)
2003 Valladolid	Pavel Bednář (CZE)	Léo Dubois-Dunilac (FRA)	Pedro Areal (ESP)
2004 Bergen	Edvin Csabai (HUN)	Radoslav Rus (SVK)	Bertrand Hémonic (FRA)
2005 Perth	Edvin Csabai (HUN)	Radoslav Rus (SVK)	Bertrand Hémonic (FRA)
2006 Tremolat	Edvin Csabai (HUN)	José Alfredo Bea (ESP)	Bertrand Hémonic (FRA)
2007 Győr	Edvin Csabai (HUN)	José Alfredo Bea (ESP)	Bertrand Hémonic (FRA)
2008 Týn nad Vltavou	Edvin Csabai (HUN)	José Alfredo Bea (ESP)	Bertrand Hémonic (FRA)
2009 Gaia	Edvin Csabai (HUN)	José Alfredo Bea (ESP)	Bertrand Hémonic (FRA)
2010 Banyoles	Nuno Barros (POR)	Manuel Campos (ESP)	Matthias Ebhardt (GER)
2011 Singapore	Matthias Ebhardt (GER)	Manuel Campos (ESP)	David Mosquera (ESP)
2012 Rome	Manuel Campos (ESP)	Péter Nagy (HUN)	Matthias Ebhardt (GER)
2013 Copenhagen	Márton Kövér (HUN)	Manuel Campos (ESP)	Tamás Kiss (HUN)
2014 Oklahoma City	Manuel Campos (ESP)	Márton Kövér (HUN)	Nuno Barros (POR)
2015 Győr	Márton Kövér (HUN)	Manuel Campos (ESP)	Nuno Barros (POR)
2016 Brandenburg an der Havel	Márton Kövér (HUN)	Manuel Campos (ESP)	Nuno Barros (POR)
2017 Pietermaritzburg	Márton Kövér (HUN)	Manuel Garrido (ESP)	Manuel Campos (ESP)
2018 Vila Verde	Manuel Campos (ESP)	Manuel Garrido (ESP)	Ádám Dóczé (HUN)
2019 Shaoxing	Manuel Campos (ESP)	Jakub Březina (CZE)	Kirill Shamshurin (RUS)
2021 Pitești	Balázs Adolf (HUN)	Márton Kövér (HUN)	Denys Davydov (UKR)
2022 Ponte de Lima	Manuel Garrido (ESP)	Márton Kövér (HUN)	Manuel Campos (ESP)
2023 Vejen	Manuel Campos (ESP)	Márton Kövér (HUN)	Manuel Garrido (ESP)
2024 Metković	Mateusz Borgieł (POL)	Manuel Campos (ESP)	Rui Lacerda (POR)
2025 Győr	Mateusz Zuchora (POL)	Mateusz Borgieł (POL)	Fernando Busto (ESP)

== C-1 short race ==
Debuted: 2019.

Championships	Gold	Silver	Bronze
2019 Shaoxing	Diego Romero (ESP)	Manuel Campos (ESP)	Jakub Březina (CZE)
2021 Pitești	Balázs Adolf (HUN)	Mateusz Borgieł (POL)	Jakub Březina (CZE)
2022 Ponte de Lima	Diego Romero (ESP)	Jaime Duro (ESP)	Mateusz Kamiński (POL)
2023 Vejen	Manuel Campos (ESP)	Mateusz Zuchora (POL)	Mateusz Borgieł (POL)
2024 Metković	Ignacio Calvo (ESP)	Mateusz Borgieł (POL)	Thomas Dubois Dunilac (FRA)
2025 Győr	Jaime Duro (ESP)	Serghei Tarnovschi (MDA)	Balázs Adolf (HUN)

== C-2 ==
Debuted: 1988.

Championships	Gold	Silver	Bronze
1988 Nottingham	Stephen Train; Andrew Train; United Kingdom	Arne Nielsen; Christian Frederiksen; Denmark	Andrezej Kaminski; K Glowacki; Poland
1990 Copenhagen	Arne Nielsen; Christian Frederiksen; Denmark	Gábor Gyursánszky; Zsolt Nadacdi; Hungary	Viktor Dobrovorski; Andrei Balabanov; Soviet Union
1992 Brisbane	Arne Nielsen; Christian Frederiksen; Denmark	Zsolt Bohács; István Gyulay; Hungary	Petr Fuksa; Zbyněk Adamec; Czech Republic
1994 Amsterdam	Zsolt Bohács; István Gyulay; Hungary	Stephen Train; Andrew Train; United Kingdom	Pedro Areal; Bienvenido Pérez; Spain
1996 Vaxholm	Stephen Train; Andrew Train; United Kingdom	Zsolt Bohács; István Gyulay; Hungary	Pedro Areal; Bienvenido Pérez; Spain
1998 Cape Town	Stephen Train; Andrew Train; United Kingdom	Edvin Csabai; Attila Györe; Hungary	Béla Jakus; Gábor Bolgovics; Hungary
1999 Győr	Attila Györe; Edvin Csabai; Hungary	Béla Jakus; Csaba Bittera; Hungary	Marcin Grzybowski; Konrad Pypłacz; Poland
2000 Dartmouth	Attila Györe; Edvin Csabai; Hungary	Richard Dalton; Michael Scarola; Canada	Vladimir Clauss; Petr Kubíček; Germany
2001 Stockton-on-Tee	Attila Györe; Edvin Csabai; Hungary	István Koncz; Aron Gajarszki; Hungary	Léo Dubois-Dunilac; Pascal Syloz; France
2002 Zamora	Attila Györe; Edvin Csabai; Hungary	Viktor Jiráský; Jan Macháč; Czech Republic	Zsolt Gilányi; Gábor Kolozsvári; Hungary
2003 Valladolid	Attila Györe; Edvin Csabai; Hungary	José Alfredo Bea; David Mascató; Spain	Viktor Jiráský; Jan Macháč; Czech Republic
2004 Bergen	Attila Györe; Edvin Csabai; Hungary	Nuno Barros; Jose Sousa; Portugal	Ramón Ferro; Oscar Grana; Spain
2005 Perth	Attila Györe; Edvin Csabai; Hungary	Gábor Furdok; Csaba Hüttner; Hungary	Ramón Ferro; Oscar Grana; Spain
2006 Tremolat	Attila Györe; Edvin Csabai; Hungary	Ramón Ferro; Oscar Grana; Spain	Nuno Barros; Jose Sousa; Portugal
2007 Győr	Attila Györe; Edvin Csabai; Hungary	Ramón Ferro; Oscar Grana; Spain	Filip Dvořák; Petr Koudelka; Czech Republic
2008 Týn nad Vltavou	Attila Györe; Edvin Csabai; Hungary	Ramón Ferro; Oscar Grana; Spain	Ángel Ribadomar; David Mascató; Spain
2009 Gaia	Peter Nagy; Edvin Csabai; Hungary	Ángel Ribadomar; David Mascató; Spain	Stéphane Hascoet; Mathieu Beugnet; France
2010 Banyoles	Óscar Graña; Ramón Ferro; Spain	Diego Romero; Ángel Ribadomar; Spain	Attila Györe; Márton Kövér; Hungary
2011 Singapore	Attila Györe; Márton Kövér; Hungary	Eduard Shemetylo; Oleg Shpak; Ukraine	Mateusz Kamiński; Bartosz Pławski; Poland
2012 Rome	Óscar Graña; Ramón Ferro; Spain	Attila Györe; Márton Kövér; Hungary	Manuel Campos; José Manuel Sánchez; Spain
2013 Copenhagen	Óscar Graña; Ramón Ferro; Spain	Manuel Campos; Diego Romero; Spain	Attila Györe; Márton Kövér; Hungary
2014 Oklahoma City	Ádám Dóczé; Márton Kövér; Hungary	Manuel Campos; José Manuel Sánchez; Spain	Óscar Graña; Ramón Ferro; Spain
2015 Győr	Ádám Dóczé; Márton Kövér; Hungary	Óscar Graña; Ramón Ferro; Spain	Manuel Campos; José Manuel Sánchez; Spain
2016 Brandenburg an der Havel	Ádám Dóczé; Márton Kövér; Hungary	Óscar Graña; Ramón Ferro; Spain	Dóri Bence Balázs; Zoltán Koleszár; Hungary
2017 Pietermaritzburg	Ádám Dóczé; Márton Kövér; Hungary	Óscar Graña; Ramón Ferro; Spain	Manuel Campos; José Manuel Sánchez; Spain
2018 Vila Verde	Óscar Graña; Diego Romero; Spain	Zoltán Koleszár; Levente Balla; Hungary	Jakub Březina; Jan Dlouhy; Czech Republic
2019 Shaoxing	Manuel Campos; Diego Romero; Spain	Mateusz Zuchora; Mateusz Borgieł; Poland	Dániel Laczó; Gergely Nagy; Hungary
2021 Pitești	Manuel Campos; Diego Romero; Spain	Mateusz Zuchora; Mateusz Borgieł; Poland	Márton Kövér; Márton Horváth; Hungary
2022 Ponte de Lima	Manuel Campos; Diego Romero; Spain	Fernando Busto; Diego Miguéns; Spain	Mateusz Zuchora; Mateusz Borgiel; Poland
2023 Vejen	Manuel Campos; Diego Romero; Spain	Fernando Busto; Diego Miguéns; Spain	Mateusz Zuchora; Mateusz Borgieł; Poland
2024 Metković	Mateusz Zuchora; Mateusz Borgieł; Poland	Jaime Duro; Óscar Graña; Spain	Rui Lacerda; Ricardo Coelho; Portugal
2025 Győr	Ricardo Coelho; Rui Lacerda; Portugal	Jaime Duro; Manuel Garrido; Spain	Mateusz Zuchora; Mateusz Borgieł; Poland
