= List of ICF Canoe Marathon World Championships medalists in men's kayak =

This is a list of medalists from the ICF Canoe Marathon World Championships in men's kayak.

== K-1 ==
Debuted: 1988.

Championships	Gold	Silver	Bronze
1988 Nottingham	John Jacoby (AUS)	Stefan Gustafsson (SWE)	Erik Onnekes (NED)
1990 Copenhagen	Kálmán Petrovics (HUN)	Stefan Gustafsson (SWE)	Claus Rorh (DEN)
1992 Brisbane	Ivan Lawler (GBR)	Stefan Gustafsson (SWE)	Rui Cancio (POR)
1994 Amsterdam	Lars Koch (DEN)	Tim Krantz (SWE)	Robert Herreveld (USA)
1996 Vaxholm	Chadleigh Meek (AUS)	Garry Mawer (IRE)	Rui Cancio (POR)
1998 Cape Town	Ivan Lawler (GBR)	Thor Nielsen (DEN)	Torgeir Toppe (NOR)
1999 Győr	Ivan Lawler (GBR)	Istvan Salga (HUN)	Edwin de Nijs (NED)
2000 Dartmouth	Manuel Busto (ESP)	Istvan Salga (HUN)	Michael Leverett (AUS)
2001 Stockton-on-Tees	Manuel Busto (ESP)	Michael Leverett (AUS)	Attila Jambor (HUN)
2002 Zamora	Manuel Busto (ESP)	Torsten Tranum) (DEN)	Attila Jambor (HUN)
2003 Valladolid	Hank McGregor (RSA)	Attila Jámbor (HUN)	Anthony Stott (RSA)
2004 Bergen	Manuel Busto (ESP)	Michael Kongsgaard (DEN)	Shaun Rubenstein (RSA)
2005 Perth	Manuel Busto (ESP)	Emilio Merchán (ESP)	Ben Fouhy (NZL)
2006 Tremolat	Shaun Rubenstein (RSA)	Manuel Busto (ESP)	Emilio Merchán (ESP)
2007 Győr	Emilio Merchán (ESP)	Manuel Busto (ESP)	Attila Jámbor (HUN)
2008 Týn nad Vltavou	Emilio Merchán (ESP)	Tomáš Ježek (CZE)	Anthony Stott (RSA)
2009 Gaia	Manuel Busto (ESP)	Benjamin Brown (GBR)	José Ramalho (POR)
2010 Banyoles	Benjamin Brown (GBR)	Manuel Busto (ESP)	Leonard Jenkins (RSA)
2011 Singapore	Hank McGregor (RSA)	Petr Jambor (CZE)	Mate Petrovics (HUN)
2012 Rome	Iván Alonso (ESP)	José Ramalho (POR)	Fernando Pimenta (POR)
2013 Copenhagen	Hank McGregor (RSA)	Iván Alonso (ESP)	Cyrille Carré (FRA)
2014 Oklahoma City	Hank McGregor (RSA)	Iván Alonso (ESP)	José Ramalho (POR)
2015 Győr	Hank McGregor (RSA)	Adrián Boros (HUN)	Iván Alonso (ESP)
2016 Brandenburg an der Havel	Hank McGregor (RSA)	Andrew Birkett (RSA)	José Ramalho (POR)
2017 Pietermaritzburg	Hank McGregor (RSA)	Andrew Birkett (RSA)	Adrián Boros (HUN)
2018 Vila Verde	Andrew Birkett (RSA)	Adrián Boros (HUN)	Jasper Mocke (RSA)
2019 Shaoxing	Mads Pedersen (DEN)	José Ramalho (POR)	Franco Balboa (ARG)
2021 Pitești	Mads Pedersen (DEN)	Iván Alonso (ESP)	Stephane Boulanger (FRA)
2022 Ponte de Lima	Andrew Birkett (RSA)	José Ramalho (POR)	Mads Pedersen (DEN)
2023 Vejen	Mads Pedersen (DEN)	Andrew Birkett (RSA)	Eivind Vold (NOR)
2024 Metković	Mads Pedersen (DEN)	José Ramalho (POR)	Adrián Martín (ESP)
2025 Győr	Mads Pedersen (DEN)	Andrew Birkett (RSA)	Csanád Sellyei (HUN)

== K-1 short race ==
Debuted: 2019.

Championships	Gold	Silver	Bronze
2019 Shaoxing	Cyrille Carré (FRA)	Jérémy Candy (FRA)	Franco Balboa (ARG)
2021 Pitești	José Ramalho (POR)	Mads Pedersen (DEN)	Iván Alonso (ESP)
2022 Ponte de Lima	Fernando Pimenta (POR)	Mads Pedersen (DEN)	Iván Alonso (ESP)
2023 Vejen	Fernando Pimenta (POR)	Mads Pedersen (DEN)	Eivind Vold (NOR)
2024 Metković	Mads Pedersen (DEN)	Hamish Lovemore (RSA)	Iván Alonso (ESP)
2025 Győr	Fernando Pimenta (POR)	Mads Pedersen (DEN)	José Ramalho (POR)

== K-2 ==
Debuted: 1988.

Championships	Gold	Silver	Bronze
1988 Nottingham	Thor Nielsen; Lars Koch| Denmark	Ivan Lawler; Graham Burns; United Kingdom	Robert Edgar; Chris Barnett; Australia
1990 Copenhagen	Thor Nielsen; Lars Koch| Denmark	Ivan Lawler; Graham Burns; United Kingdom	Jens Stegemann; Olaf Scheu; West Germany
1992 Brisbane	Ramon Andersson; Steven Wood; Australia	Bruno Jannis; Werner Jannis; Belgium	Magnus Skoldbeck; Tommy Karls; Sweden
1994 Amsterdam	Steven Harris; Ivan Lawler; United Kingdom	Csaba László; László Tóth; Hungary	Thomas Christiansen; Karsten Solgard; Denmark
1996 Vaxholm	Steven Harris; Ivan Lawler; United Kingdom	Magnus Skoldbeck; Tom Krantz; Sweden	Jesus Villaverda; Roberto Villaverda; Portugal
1998 Cape Town	Viktor Szakály; Attila Jámbor; Hungary	Tim Brabants; Conor Holmes; United Kingdom	Karsten Solgard; Thor Nielsen; Denmark
1999 Győr	Viktor Szakály; Attila Jámbor; Hungary	Santiago Guerrero; Jorge Alonso; Spain	Thomas Christiansen; Karsten Solgard; Denmark
2000 Dartmouth	Santiago Guerrero; Jorge Alonso; Spain	Julio Martínez; Rafael Quevedo; Spain	Marcio Pinto; Miguel Gomes; Portugal
2001 Stockton-on-Tee	Eirik Larsen; Nils Fjeldheim; Norway	Martin Kolanda; Branislav Sramek; Czech Republic	Santiago Guerrero; Jorge Alonso; Spain
2002 Zamora	Eirik Larsen; Nils Fjeldheim; Norway	Edwin de Nijs; Dolph te Linde; Netherlands	Manuel Busto; Julio Martínez; Spain
2003 Valladolid	Attila Jámbor; István Salga; Hungary	Manuel Busto; Javier Hernanz; Spain	Santiago Guerrero; Jorge Alonso; Spain
2004 Bergen	Oier Arzpurua; Manuel Busto; Spain	István Salga; Attila Jámbor; Hungary	Viktor Szakály; Krisztián Szigeti; Hungary
2005 Perth	Oier Arzpurua; Manuel Busto; Spain	{Viktor Szakály; Krisztián Szigeti; Hungary	Santiago Guerrero; Jorge Alonso; Spain
2006 Tremolat	Oier Arzpurua; Manuel Busto; Spain	Shaun Rubenstein; Shaun Biggs; South Africa	Tamás Homoki; Attila Jámbor; Hungary
2007 Győr	Oier Arzpurua; Manuel Busto; Spain	Jorge Alonso; Santiago Guerrero; Spain	Balázs Börcsök; István Salga; Hungary
2008 Týn nad Vltavou	Anthony Stott; Cameron Schoeman; South Africa	Jorge Alonso; Santiago Guerrero; Spain	Attila Jámbor; Máté Petrovics; Hungary
2009 Gaia	Emilio Merchán; Álvaro Fernández; Spain	Shaun Rubenstein; Ant Stott; South Africa	Jakub Adam; Petr Jambor; Czech Republic
2010 Banyoles	Walter Bouzán; Álvaro Fernández; Spain	Jorge Alonso; Albert Corominas; Spain	Jakub Adam; Michael Odvárko; Czech Republic
2011 Singapore	Walter Bouzán; Álvaro Fernández; Spain	Romain Marcaud; Edwin Lucas; France	Jakub Adam; Michael Odvárko; Czech Republic
2012 Rome	Emilio Merchán; Iván Alonso; Spain	Walter Bouzán; Álvaro Fernández; Spain	Simon van Gysen; Jasper Mocke; South Africa
2013 Copenhagen	Emilio Merchán; Iván Alonso; Spain	Walter Bouzán; Álvaro Fernández; Spain	Bálint Noé; Milán Noé; Hungary
2014 Oklahoma City	Hank McGregor; Jasper Mocke; South Africa	Walter Bouzán; Álvaro Fernández; Spain	Emilio Merchán; Iván Alonso; Spain
2015 Győr	Adrián Boros; László Solti; Hungary	Hank McGregor; Jasper Mocke; South Africa	Walter Bouzán; Álvaro Fernández; Spain
2016 Brandenburg an der Havel	Hank McGregor; Jasper Mocke; South Africa	Adrián Boros; László Solti; Hungary	Andrew Birkett; Louis Hattingh; South Africa
2017 Pietermaritzburg	Hank McGregor; Jasper Mocke; South Africa	Adrián Boros; László Solti; Hungary	Andrew Birkett; Jean van der Westhuyzen; South Africa
2018 Vila Verde	Hank McGregor; Andrew Birkett; South Africa	Adrián Boros; László Solti; Hungary	Miguel Llorens; Luis Amado Pérez; Spain
2019 Shaoxing	Quentin Urban; Jérémy Candy; France	Adrián Boros; Krisztián Máthé; Hungary	Franco Balboa; Dardo Balboa; Argentina
2021 Pitești	Quentin Urban; Jérémy Candy; France	Adrián Boros; Tamás Erdélyi; Hungary	Cyrille Carré; Stephane Boulanger; France
2022 Ponte de Lima	José Ramalho; Fernando Pimenta; Portugal	Miguel Llorens; Alberto Plaza; Spain	Eivind Vold; Amund Vold; Norway
2023 Vejen	José Ramalho; Fernando Pimenta; Portugal	Quentin Urban; Jérémy Candy; France	Eivind Vold; Amund Vold; Norway
2024 Metković	José Ramalho; Fernando Pimenta; Portugal	Quentin Urban; Jérémy Candy; France	Adrián Boros; Tamás Erdélyi; Hungary
2025 Győr	José Ramalho; Fernando Pimenta; Portugal	Mads Pedersen; Philip Knudsen; Denmark	Adrián Boros; Tamás Erdélyi; Hungary
