= 2014 Canoe Marathon European Championships =

The 2014 Canoe Marathon European Championships were the eleventh edition of the Canoe Marathon European Championships, which took place between 13 and 15 June 2014 in Piešťany, Slovakia. The competition was staged on the Váh river and consisted of fifteen events – ten in kayak and five in canoe – divided in junior, under-23 and senior categories.

== Medalists ==
=== Juniors ===
Event	Gold	Time	Silver	Time	Bronze	Time
Men's C-1	Bence Dóri (HUN)	1:35:53.814	Zoltán Koleszár (HUN)	1:36:03.600	Andrii Bezuhlyi (UKR)	1:36:36.233
Men's C-2	Hungary (HUN); Zoltán Koleszár; Márk Török	1:29:56.057	Poland (POL); Lukasz Piochacz; Lukasz Rybakowski	1:30:22.800	Hungary (HUN); Norbert Burony; Daniel Jurás	1:30:30.179
Men's K-1	Máté Györgyjakab (HUN)	1:38:00.381	Magnus Gregory (GBR)	1:38:39.427	Yannik Pflugfelder (GER)	1:43:13.581
Men's K-2	Hungary (HUN); Máté Györgyjakab; Kristóf Piller	1:33:26.042	Germany (GER); Torben Blume; Eirk Lieseke	1:34:46.075	Spain (ESP); Imanol Barruetabeña; Unai Gereka	1:35:41.246
Women's K-1	Elisabetta Maffioli (ITA)	1:31:40.029	Lili Katona (HUN)	1:32:12.049	Estefanía Fernández (ESP)	1:33:35.828
Women's K-2	Hungary (HUN); Lilla Bánki; Csenge Rekop	1:28:57.091	Spain (ESP); Isabel López; Irene Martín	1:29:04.107	Denmark (DEN); Line Eriksen; Cathrine Rask	1:29:30.596

=== Under–23 ===
Event	Gold	Time	Silver	Time	Bronze	Time
Men's C-1	Rui Lacerda (POR)	1:51:08.717	Ádám Dóczé (HUN)	1:51:33.342	Bartosz Dubiak (POL)	1:52:57.024
Men's K-1	Morten Minde (NOR)	1:56:46.517	Alejandro Sánchez (ESP)	1:56:47.755	Guillermo Fidalgo (ESP)	1:56.48.029
Women's K-1	Enikő Váczai (HUN)	1:50:20.209	Michaela Lindblad (SWE)	1:50:37.873	Susanna Cicali (ITA)	1:50:50.939

=== Seniors ===
Event	Gold	Time	Silver	Time	Bronze	Time
Men's C-1	Nuno Barros (POR)	2:07:42.324	Márton Kövér (HUN)	2:07:49.147	David Mosquera (ESP)	2:08:03.408
Men's C-2	Spain (ESP); Oscar Graña; Ramon Ferro	2:00:26.744	Ukraine (UKR); Oleksandr Levchenko; Andrii Shapoval	2:01:13.643	Poland (POL); Bartosz Dubiak; Mateusz Zuchora	2:03:04.571
Men's K-1	José Ramalho (POR)	2:14:14.246	Iván Alonso (ESP)	2:14:16.313	Mathias Hamar (NOR)	2:14:19.012
Men's K-2	Spain (ESP); Emilio Merchán; Iván Alonso	2:03:56.699	Spain (ESP); Walter Bouzán; Álvaro Fernández	2:03:57.004	Great Britain (GBR); Andrew Daniels; Timothy Pendle	2:03:57.844
Women's K-1	Renáta Csay (HUN)	2:02:14.005	Lizzie Broughton (GBR)	2:02:39.606	Stefania Cicali (ITA)	2:03:15.526
Women's K-2	Hungary (HUN); Edina Csernák; Enikő Váczai	1:59:23.385	Italy (ITA); Anna Alberti; Stefania Cicali	1:59:42.093	Great Britain (GBR); Fay Lamph; Lizzie Broughton	2:02:40.659

== Medal table ==
Rank	Nation	Gold	Silver	Bronze	Total
1	Hungary	8	4	1	13
2	Portugal	3	0	0	3
3	Spain	2	4	4	10
4	Italy	1	1	2	4
5	Norway	1	0	1	2
6	Great Britain	0	2	2	4
7	Poland	0	1	2	3
8	Germany	0	1	1	2
8	Ukraine	0	1	1	2
10	Sweden	0	1	0	1
11	Denmark	0	0	1	1
Totals (11 entries)		15	15	15	45
