= 2015 Canoe Marathon European Championships =

The 2015 Canoe Marathon European Championships were the twelfth edition of the Canoe Marathon European Championships, which took place between 1 and 5 July 2015 at Bohinj, Slovenia. The competition consisted of sixteen events – ten in kayak and six in canoe – divided in junior, under-23 and senior categories.

== Medalists ==
=== Juniors ===
Event	Gold	Time	Silver	Time	Bronze	Time
Men's C-1	Dániel Laczó (HUN)	01:35:28.25	Bruno Kumpez (CRO)	01:38:06.45	Dominik Nowacki (POL)	01:38:38.68
Men's C-2	Spain (ESP); Ignacio Moya; Álvaro Velasco	01:27:39.22	Hungary (HUN); János Csiga; Csaba Sávai	01:28:46.60	Poland (POL); Lukasz Piochacz; Lukasz Ribakowski	01:30:23.36
Men's K-1	Magnus Gregory (GBR)	01:40:21.73	Ziggy Chmiel (GBR)	01:40:24.62	Nikolai Winther (DEN)	01:40:37.94
Men's K-2	Spain (ESP); Unai Goienetxe; Imanol Amilibia	01:35:14.61	Denmark (DEN); Jonathan Dagnaes-Hansen; Soren Marreti	01:35:20.55	Norway (NOR); Jon Vold; Magnus Ivarsen	01:35:27.94
Women's C-1	Giada Bragato (HUN)	01:29:21.95	Pauline Martin (FRA)	01:29:50.74	Belén Arnau (ESP)	01:32:16.12
Women's K-1	Cathrine Rask (DEN)	01:32:34.14	Réka Dominika Petö (HUN)	01:34:06.75	Jule Hake (GER)	01:34:21.11
Women's K-2	Denmark (DEN); Cathrine Rask; Line Langelund	01:25:48.16	Germany (GER); Jule Hake; Pia Engelhardt	01:26:57.07	Hungary (HUN); Fruzsina Gál; Anett Fritz	01:28:29.90

=== Under 23 ===
Event	Gold	Time	Silver	Time	Bronze	Time
Men's C-1	Levente Balla (HUN)	01:53:34.72	Gergely Nagy (HUN)	01:53:39.54	Carlos Vega (ESP)	01:55:49.89
Men's K-1	László Solti (HUN)	01:56:25.88	Ádám Petró (HUN)	01:56:32.92	Alejandro Sánchez (ESP)	01:56.45.53
Women's K-1	Vanda Kiszli (HUN)	01:49:13.89	Susanna Cicali (ITA)	01:49:37.35	Estefania Fernández (ESP)	01:51:06.25

=== Seniors ===
Event	Gold	Time	Silver	Time	Bronze	Time
Men's C-1	Márton Kövér (HUN)	02:07:07.92	David Mosquera (ESP)	02:07:42.81	Nuno Barros (POR)	02:10:34.45
Men's C-2	Hungary (HUN); Márton Kövér; Ádám Dóczé	01:58:23.54	Spain (ESP); Oscar Graña; Ramon Ferro	01:58:54.92	Ukraine (UKR); Oleksandr Levchenko; Andrii Shapoval	01:59:49.39
Men's K-1	José Ramalho (POR)	02:12:46.59	Ivan Alonso (ESP)	02:13:33.78	Emilio Merchán (ESP)	02:13:39.01
Men's K-2	Spain (ESP); Emilio Merchán; Ivan Alonso	02:01:18.42	Hungary (HUN); Adrián Boros; László Solti	02:01:18.79	Spain (ESP); Walter Bouzan; Álvaro Fiuza	02:01:24.96
Women's K-1	Renáta Csay (HUN)	02:03:21.29	Lizzie Broughton (GBR)	02:03:52.75	Anna Alberti (ITA)	02:03:54.22
Women's K-2	Hungary (HUN); Renáta Csay; Alexandra Bara	01:55:12.17	Italy (ITA); Stefania Cicali; Anna Alberti	01:55:12.42	Hungary (HUN); Noémi Lucz; Edina Csernák	02:00:08:27

== Medal table ==
Rank	Nation	Gold	Silver	Bronze	Total
1	Hungary	9	5	2	16
2	Spain	3	3	5	11
3	Denmark	2	1	1	4
4	Great Britain	1	2	0	3
5	Portugal	1	0	1	2
6	Italy	0	2	1	3
7	Germany	0	1	1	2
8	Croatia	0	1	0	1
8	France	0	1	0	1
10	Poland	0	0	2	2
11	Norway	0	0	1	1
11	Ukraine	0	0	1	1
Totals (12 entries)		16	16	15	47
