= 2016 Canoe Marathon European Championships =

The 2016 Canoe Marathon European Championships is the thirteenth edition of the Canoe Marathon European Championships, which took place between 30 June and 3 July 2016 at Pontevedra, Spain. The competition consisted of seventeen events – ten in kayak and seven in canoe – divided into junior, under–23 and senior categories.

== Medalists ==
=== Seniors ===
Event	Gold	Time	Silver	Time	Bronze	Time
Men's C-1	Manuel Campos (ESP)	2:08:33	Márton Kövér (HUN)	2:08:34	Nuno Barros (POR)	2:10:24
Men's C-2	Spain (ESP); Manuel Camposo; José Sánchez	2:00:50	Spain (ESP); Ramon Ferro; Óscar Graña	2:01:22	Hungary (HUN); Márton Kövér; Ádám Dóczé	2:02:02
Men's K-1	José Ramalho (POR)	2:08:31	Emilio Merchán (ESP)	2:08:32	Adrián Boros (HUN)	2:08:33
Men's K-2	Spain (ESP); Ivan Alonso; Diego Piña	2:00:41	Spain (ESP); Luíz Pérez; Miguel Llorens	2:00:54	Denmark (DEN); Mads Pedersen; Nicolai Due Gadegaard Mørcke	2:01:26
Women's C-1	Cathrin Duerr (GER)	1:51:10	Pauline Martin (FRA)	1:57:33	Raquel Rodríguez (ESP)	1:59:29
Women's K-1	Renáta Csay (HUN)	2:03:00	Vanda Kiszli (HUN)	2:03:39	Anna Kožíšková (CZE)	2:05:11
Women's K-2	Hungary (HUN); Renáta Csay; Alexandra Bara	1:56:22	Czech Republic (CZE); Anna Kožíšková; Lenka Hrochová	1:59:45	Great Britain (GBR); Lizzie Broughton; Fay Lamph	1:59:49

=== Under 23 ===
Event	Gold	Time	Silver	Time	Bronze	Time
Men's C-1	Bence Balázs Dóri (HUN)	1:51:48	Patryk Gluza (POL)	1:52:09	Mateusz Borgiel (POL)	1:53:56
Men's K-1	Ádám Petró (HUN)	1:52:35	Mads Pedersen (DEN)	1:52:38	Nicolai Due Gadegaard Mørcke (DEN)	1:53:26
Women's K-1	Vanda Kiszli (HUN)	1:49:10	Noémi Miskó (HUN)	1:49:30	Emilie Rosenkilde (DEN)	1:49:32

=== Juniors ===
Event	Gold	Time	Silver	Time	Bronze	Time
Men's C-1	Sérgio Maciel (POR)	1:35:37	Sebestyén Simon (HUN)	1:35:57	Balázs Adlof (HUN)	1:36:03
Men's C-2	Portugal (POR); Ricardo Coelho; Duarte Silva	1:29:10	Germany (GER); Arved Heine; Jonas Mode	1:29:23	Poland (POL); Patryk Piotrowicz; Mateusz Cybula	1:30:00
Men's K-1	Bendegúz Bazsonyi Bálint (HUN)	1:42:26	Luis Ferreira (POR)	1:42:31	Nico Paufler (GER)	1:42:37
Men's K-2	Hungary (HUN); István Lukács; Ákos Obert	1:33:34	Spain (ESP); Francisco Capín; David Migoya	1:33:41	Portugal (POR); Luis Ferreira; Nuno Cruz	1:34:02
Women's C-1	Panna Pálfia (HUN)	1:32:27	Julia Dunkel (GER)	1:34:43	Lara Outon (ESP)	1:37:23
Women's K-1	Viktória Nagy (HUN)	1:35:16	Zsófia Balogh (HUN)	1:35:40	Nora Rey (ESP)	1:39:13
Women's K-2	Hungary (HUN); Viktória Nagy; Zsófia Korsós	1:27:03	Belgium (BEL); Roos Broekx; Hanna Plas	1:27:18	Denmark (DEN); Cathrine Rask; Line Langelund	1:27:57

== Medal table ==
Rank	Nation	Gold	Silver	Bronze	Total
1	Hungary (HUN)	10	5	3	18
2	Spain (ESP)	3	4	3	10
3	Portugal (POR)	3	1	2	6
4	Germany (GER)	1	2	1	4
5	Denmark (DEN)	0	1	4	5
6	Poland (POL)	0	1	2	3
7	Czech Republic (CZE)	0	1	1	2
8	Belgium (BEL)	0	1	0	1
8	France (FRA)	0	1	0	1
10	Great Britain (GBR)	0	0	1	1
Totals (10 entries)		17	17	17	51
