= 2013 Canoe Marathon European Championships =

The 2013 Canoe Marathon European Championships were the tenth edition of the Canoe Marathon European Championships, which took place between 7 and 9 June 2013 in Vila Verde, Portugal. The competition was staged on the Cávado River and consisted of fifteen events – ten in kayak and five in canoe – divided in junior, under-23 and senior categories.

== Medalists ==
=== Juniors ===
Event	Gold	Time	Silver	Time	Bronze	Time
Men's C-1	Norbert Paufler (HUN)	01:28:12.13	Hugo Jouin (FRA)	01:29:26.55	Patryk Gluza (POL)	01:29:36.35
Men's C-2	Hungary (HUN); Norbert Paufler; Norbert Burony	01:22:05.48	Hungary (HUN); Márk Török; Zoltán Koleszár	01:22:41.45	Poland (POL); Roman Furtak; Lawrence Drojetzki	01:23:42.26
Men's K-1	Casper Pretzmann (DEN)	01:34:33.67	Mads Pedersen (DEN)	01:34:56.27	Miguel Rodrigues (POR)	01:36:07.27
Men's K-2	Denmark (DEN); Casper Pretzmann; Morten Graversen	01:29:00.82	Spain (ESP); David Martin; Fernando Garcia	01:32:18.80	Hungary (HUN); Péter Freisták; Gergely Oláh	01:32:26.56
Women's K-1	Amy Ward (GBR)	01:24:26.67	Alina Gieres (GER)	01:24:37.99	Katrine Christensen (DEN)	01:25:02.53
Women's K-2	Great Britain (GBR); Samantha Rees-Clark; Amy Ward	01:20:47.59	Hungary (HUN); Zsófia Metz; Mercédesz Mátyás	01:21:57.16	Hungary (HUN); Fanni Lõvei; Kitti Lõvei	01:22:00.87

=== Under 23 ===
Event	Gold	Time	Silver	Time	Bronze	Time
Men's C-1	Rui Lacerda (POR)	01:45:30.69	Samuel Amorim (POR)	01:45:32.07	Alan Avila (ESP)	01:46:36.46
Men's K-1	Alejandro Sánchez (ESP)	01:53:32.35	Adrián Boros (HUN)	01:53:33.00	Balázs Havas (HUN)	01:53.39.46
Women's K-1	Susanna Cicali (ITA)	01:44:44.24	Michaela Lindblad (SWE)	01:44:49.06	Raquel Carbajo (ESP)	01:45:03.58

=== Seniors ===
Event	Gold	Time	Silver	Time	Bronze	Time
Men's C-1	António Campos (ESP)	02:03:33.61	Manuel Garrido (ESP)	02:04:46.46	Matthias Ebhardt (GER)	02:06:20.76
Men's C-2	Spain (ESP); Oscar Graña; Ramon Ferro	01:55:02.23	Hungary (HUN); Márton Kövér; Attila Györe	01:55:09.67	Spain (ESP); Alan Avila; Carlos Vega	01:55:47.96
Men's K-1	Ivan Alonso (ESP)	02:11:37.92	José Ramalho (POR)	02:11:40.60	Máté Petrovics (HUN)	02:11:46.62
Men's K-2	Spain (ESP); Emilio Merchán; Ivan Alonso	02:02:28.45	Czech Republic (CZE); Jakub Adam; Michael Odvarko	02:02:38.62	Hungary (HUN); Adrián Boros; László Solti	02:02:41.03
Women's K-1	Alexandra Bara (HUN)	02:05:41.33	Lenka Hrochova (CZE)	02:05:43.79	Edina Csernák (HUN)	02:06:05.27
Women's K-2	Great Britain (GBR); Fay Lamph; Lizzie Broughton	01:57:28.82	Spain (ESP); Nuria Villace; Raquel Carbajo	01:57:49.71	Hungary (HUN); Vanda Kiszli; Alexandra Bara	01:58:10:93

== Medal table ==
Rank	Nation	Gold	Silver	Bronze	Total
1	Spain	5	3	3	11
2	Hungary	3	4	7	14
3	Great Britain	3	0	0	3
4	Denmark	2	1	1	4
5	Portugal	1	2	1	4
6	Italy	1	0	0	1
7	Czech Republic	0	2	0	2
8	Germany	0	1	1	2
9	France	0	1	0	1
9	Sweden	0	1	0	1
11	Poland	0	0	2	2
Totals (11 entries)		15	15	15	45
