= Berg River Canoe Marathon =

- Date: July
- Location: Paarl/Velddrif, South Africa
- Event type: Canoe Marathon
- Distance: 240 kilometres (150 mi)
- Established: 1962
- Website: The Berg River Canoe Marathon

The Berg River Canoe Marathon takes place annually in South Africa's Western Cape Province over a distance of some 240 km from Paarl to the small harbour of Velddrif on the West Coast. The three other notable South African canoe races are the Dusi Canoe Marathon, the Breede River Canoe Marathon and the Fish River Canoe Marathon.

The first Berg River marathon took place in 1962. It is usually run over four days, often in pouring rain during the wet winter month of July, when the Berg River level is expected to be at its highest. The water is fast-flowing, often through narrow channels choked with trees, low branches, and submerged obstacles. The course of the river is due north from Paarl to Piketberg and from there it meanders west across the coastal plain to Velddrif.

On the day before the start of the race, seeding time trials are held to determine the starting positions of the first 60 paddlers from a field of more than 200. It is the longest canoe marathon in the country and traverses scenic wineland countryside, with overnight stops at Zonquasdrift, Bridgetown (which lies on the upper reaches of the Misverstand Dam) and Zoutkloof.

The Berg River Canoe Marathon also makes up the final leg of the Two Oceans Peninsula Iron Man, the first two legs being the Cape Argus Cycle Race and the Two Oceans Marathon. For the 2010 race the winner's purse was set at R25 000.

== Winners ==
=== Men ===
| 2016 | Hank McGregor | 38 | 17:37:39.55 | South Africa |
|---|---|---|---|---|
| 2014 | Andy Birkett | 23 | 16:59:04 | South Africa |
| 2013 | Lance King | 25 | 17:17:30 | South Africa |
| 2012 | Hank McGregor | 34 | 15:53:47 | South Africa |
| 2011 | Hank McGregor | 33 | 16:59.25 | South Africa |
| 2010 | Hank McGregor | 32 | 16:04:32 | South Africa |
| 2009 | Hank McGregor | 31 | 13:22:54 | South Africa |
| 2008 | Hank McGregor | 30 | 13:20:09 | South Africa |
| 2007 | Hank McGregor | 29 | 17:12:46 | South Africa |
| 2006 | Hank McGregor | 28 | 17:39:54 | South Africa |
| 2005 | Hank McGregor | 27 | 17:10:34 | South Africa |
| 2004 | Jacques P Theron | 27 | 16:15:23 | South Africa |
| 2003 | Jacques P Theron | 26 | 16:40:33 | South Africa |
| 2002 | Jacques P Theron | 25 | 14:22:08 | South Africa |
| 2001 | Graeme Solomon | 28 | 12:36:44 | South Africa |
| 2000 | Hank McGregor | 22 | 16:13:29 | South Africa |

=== Women ===
| 2016 | Bianca Beavitt | 26 | 20:27:14.73 | South Africa |
|---|---|---|---|---|
| 2014 | Abby Adie | | 18:38:39 | South Africa |
| 2013 | Jenna Ward | 20 | 20:43:06 | South Africa |
| 2012 | Jen Theron | 32 | 17:38:21 | South Africa |
| 2011 | Michele Eray | 32 | 19:06.02 | South Africa |
| 2010 | Robyn Kime | 20 | 17:57:15 | South Africa |
| 2009 | Robyn Kime | 19 | 15:26:07 | South Africa |
| 2008 | Abbey Miedema | 28 | 14:55:06 | South Africa |
| 2007 | Abbey Miedema | 27 | 19:41:57 | South Africa |
| 2006 | Abbey Miedema | 26 | 19:40:07 | South Africa |
| 2005 | Alexa Lombard | 25 | 18:37:41 | South Africa |
| 2004 | Abbey Miedema | 24 | 18:46:24 | South Africa |
| 2003 | Alexa Lombard | 23 | 18:56:30 | South Africa |
| 2002 | Alexa Lombard | 22 | 15:45:51 | South Africa |
| 2001 | Alexa Lombard | 21 | 13:33:06 | South Africa |
| 2000 | Jean Wilson | 31 | 18:37:18 | South Africa |
