= 2017 Canoe Marathon European Championships =

Kayaking and canoeing event

The 2017 Canoe Marathon European Championships is the fourteenth edition of the Canoe Marathon European Championships, which took place between 29 June and 2 July 2017 at Ponte de Lima, Portugal. The competition consisted of sixteen events – nine in kayak and seven in canoe – divided in junior, under–23 and senior categories.

== Medalists ==
=== Juniors ===
| Event | Gold | Time | Silver | Time | Bronze | Time |
|---|---|---|---|---|---|---|
| Men's C-1 | Sebestyén Simon (HUN) | 01:35:51.03 | Dániel Fejes (HUN) | 01:36:10.90 | Duarte Silva (POR) | 01:36:58.14 |
| Men's C-2 | Germany (GER); Arved Heine; Jonas Mode | 01:31:31.14 | Hungary (HUN); Dávid Hodován; Kristóf Kollár | 01:31:32.57 | Poland (POL); Patryk Piotrowicz; Mateusz Cybula | 01:31:51.54 |
| Men's K-1 | Levente Vékássy (HUN) | 01:42:12.88 | Charles Smith (GBR) | 01:42:13.43 | Ronan Foley (IRL) | 01:42:21.49 |
| Men's K-2 | Hungary (HUN); András Redl; Levente Vékássy | 01:38:47.82 | Denmark (DEN); Thorbjørn Rask; Nikolai Thomsen | 01:38:50.91 | Hungary (HUN); Balázs Bodnár; Ádám Horváth | 01:38:54.43 |
| Women's C-1 | Mathilde Troncin (FRA) | 01:29:45.83 | Maja Szajdek (POL) | 01:32:20.56 | Andrea Vázquez (ESP) | 01:32:41.95 |
| Women's K-1 | Dorina Fekete (HUN) | 01:34:29.45 | Viktória Nagy (HUN) | 01:34:33.20 | Rita Fernandes (POR) | 01:36:01.49 |
| Women's K-2 | Hungary (HUN); Zsófia Korsós; Viktória Nagy | 01:26:53.92 | Hungary (HUN); Dorina Fekete; Emese Tanka | 01:29:12.25 | Great Britain (GBR); Emma Russell; Freya Peters | 01:29:29.01 |

=== Under 23 ===
| Event | Gold | Time | Silver | Time | Bronze | Time |
|---|---|---|---|---|---|---|
| Men's C-1 | Patryk Gluza (POL) | 01:49:31.26 | Mateusz Borgiel (POL) | 01:49:32.58 | Sérgio Maciel (POR) | 01:49:47.24 |
| Men's K-1 | Ádám Petró (HUN) | 01:54:43.30 | Miguel Llorens (ESP) | 01:54:47.49 | Zyggy Chmiel (GBR) | 01:54:52.45 |
| Women's K-1 | Noémi Horváth (HUN) | 01:49:35.55 | Zsófia Czéllai-Vörös (HUN) | 01:49:42.61 | Alexandra Lane (GBR) | 01:49:43.38 |

=== Seniors ===
| Event | Gold | Time | Silver | Time | Bronze | Time |
|---|---|---|---|---|---|---|
| Men's C-1 | Márton Kövér (HUN) | 02:08:38.39 | Manuel Campos (ESP) | 02:08:48.20 | Manuel Garrido (ESP) | 02:09:44.85 |
| Men's C-2 | Spain (SPA); Manuel Campos; José Sanchez | 01:59:30.16 | Hungary (HUN); Márton Kövér; Adám Dóczé | 01:59:32.03 | Spain (SPA); Óscar Graña; Ramón Ferrero | 02:01:19.18 |
| Men's K-1 | José Ramalho (POR) | 02:11:54.52 | Adrián Boros (HUN) | 02:11:55.47 | Quentin Urban (FRA) | 02:11:56.62 |
| Men's K-2 | Hungary (HUN); Adrián Boros; Lászlo Solti | 02:00:14.20 | Spain (SPA); Walter Bouzán; Álvaro Fernández Fiuza | 02:00:15.74 | Spain (SPA); Miguel Llorens; Luis Amado Pérez | 02:00:16.84 |
| Women's C-1 | Liudmyla Babak (UKR) | 01:48:32.55 | Fruzsina Miskolczi (HUN) | 01:52:00.27 | Jenifer Casal (ESP) | 01:54:32.07 |
| Women's K-1 | Renáta Csay (HUN) | 02:03:15.45 | Lani Belcher (GBR) | 02:03:15.67 | Vanda Kiszli (HUN) | 02:03:39.18 |
| Women's K-2 | Hungary (HUN); Renata Csay; Alexandra Bara | 01:56:55.00 | Hungary (HUN); Lili Katona; Eniko Váczai | 01:57:28.52 | Spain (SPA); Eva Barrios; Aurora Figueras | 02:00:16.84 |

== Medal table ==
| Rank | Nation | Gold | Silver | Bronze | Total |
|---|---|---|---|---|---|
| 1 | Hungary | 11 | 9 | 2 | 22 |
| 2 | Spain | 1 | 3 | 6 | 10 |
| 3 | Poland | 1 | 2 | 1 | 4 |
| 4 | Portugal | 1 | 0 | 3 | 4 |
| 5 | France | 1 | 0 | 1 | 2 |
| 6 | Germany | 1 | 0 | 0 | 1 |
| 6 | Ukraine | 1 | 0 | 0 | 1 |
| 8 | Great Britain | 0 | 2 | 3 | 5 |
| 9 | Denmark | 0 | 1 | 0 | 1 |
| 10 | Ireland | 0 | 0 | 1 | 1 |
| Totals (10 entries) | | 17 | 17 | 17 | 51 |
