= Maria Kazakova =

Maria Kazakova may refer to:

- Maria Kazakova (canoeist) (Мария Вячеславовна Казакова; born 1988), Russian sprint canoeist
- Maria Kazakova (figure skater) (Мария Евгеньевна Казакова; born 2001), Russian-Georgian ice dancer
