= Lance Shane King =

South African canoeist

Lance Shane King is a South Africa River Marathon Canoeist who has won seven gold medals at the Berg River Canoe Marathon since 2007. He has also represented South Africa at the Australian Youth Olympic Festival in 2005 in Sydney, achieving Protea National Colours in 2007 at the World Marathon Championships. His maiden victory was in the 2013 edition of the Berg River Canoe Marathon
