= 2021 Canoe Marathon European Championships =

- Venue: Krylatskoye Rowing Canal
- Location: Moscow, Russia
- Dates: 7–11 July
- Nations: 9

The 2021 Canoe Marathon European Championships took place from 7 to 11 July 2021 in Moscow, Russia.

== Medalists ==
=== Senior ===
Event	Gold		Silver		Bronze	
Men
K1 Short Race (3,40 km)	José Ramalho (POR)	13:43.44	Quentin Urban (FRA)	13:44.79	Adrián Boros (HUN)	13:50.71
C1 Short Race (3,40 km)	Mateusz Borgiel (POL)	15:43.24	Dániel Laczó (HUN)	15:54.67	Roman Erlinekov (RUS)	16:01.63
K1 (29,80 km)	José Ramalho (POR)	2:14:59.56	Cyrille Carré (FRA)	2:15:00.56	Stéphane Boulanger (FRA)	2:15:01.67
C1 (26,20 km)	Márton Kövér (HUN)	2:06:26.40	Roman Erlinekov (RUS)	2:11:06.26	Dániel Laczó (HUN)	2:14:53.22
K2 (29,80 km)	France; Quentin Urban; Jérémy Candy	2:01:26.36	Portugal; José Ramalho; Ricardo Carvalho	2:02:03.16	Hungary; Adrián Boros; Krisztián Máthé	2:04:42.17
C2 (26,20 km)	Hungary; Márton Kövér; Márton Horváth	1:58:20.25	Portugal; Rui Lacerda; Ricardo Coelho	2:00:23.06	Poland; Mateusz Borgiel; Mateusz Zuchora	2:01:20.78
Women
K1 Short Race (3,40 km)	Kristina Bedeč (SRB)	15:20.80	Vanda Kiszli (HUN)	15:21.44	Zsófia Czéllai (HUN)	15:22.24
C1 Short Race (3,40 km)	Zsófia Kisbán (HUN)	17:50.84	Maria Kazakova (RUS)	18:40.51	Adrianna Antos (POL)	18:47.52
K1 (26,20 km)	Vanda Kiszli (HUN)	2:06:58.00	Zsófia Czéllai (HUN)	2:06:59.75	Kristina Bedeč (SRB)	2:08:45.14
C1 (15,40 km)	Zsófia Kisbán (HUN)	1:24:51.99	Maria Kazakova (RUS)	1:27:40.92	Adrianna Antos (POL)	1:27:49.50
K2 (26,20 km)	Hungary; Renáta Csay; Zsófia Czéllai	2:00:35.22	France; Amelie Kessler; Yseline Huet	2:02:33.60	Hungary; Rebeka Szmrtyka; Panna Sinkó	2:02:58.44

=== Under 23 ===
Event	Gold		Silver		Bronze	
Men
K1 (26,20 km)	Adriano Conceição (POR)	1:57:44.06	Zoltán Zoboki (HUN)	1:57:50.54	Dan Sedláček (CZE)	1:58:27.55
C1 (22,60 km)	Sérgio Maciel (POR)	1:51:11.20	Dániel Laczó (HUN)	1:52:49.60	Máté Zsidai (HUN)	1:55:44.64
Women
K1 (22,60 km)	Dorina Fekete (HUN)	1:51:19.62	Csilla Rugási (HUN)	1:51:23.35	Marta Witkowska (POL)	1:54:09.17

=== Junior ===
Event	Gold		Silver		Bronze	
Men
K1 (22,60 km)	Csanád Sellyei (HUN)	1:47:33.00	Bruno Kolozsvári (HUN)	1:47:37.97	Rodrigo Santos (POR)	1:47:51.84
C1 (19,00 km)	Bulcsú Ferencz (HUN)	1:36:32.76	István Juhász (HUN)	1:38:44.24	Tomas Sousa (POR)	1:39:26.42
K2 (22,60 km)	Hungary; Bruno Kolozsvári; Olivér Mitring	1:35:39.23	Portugal; Francisco Santos; Fernando Costa	1:35:45.46	Hungary; Olivér Varga; Szilveszter Bolehradsky	1:35:54.69
C2 (19,00 km)	Hungary; Gergely Lugosi; István Juhász	1:30:31.88	Romania; Adrian Stepan; Victor Stepan	1:32:40.69	Hungary; Andras Ugroczky; Bulcsú Ferencz	1:35:55.19
Women
K1 (19,00 km)	Maja Horváth (HUN)	1:35:03.77	Adél Kálovics (HUN)	1:35:56.00	Iuliia Babashinskaia (RUS)	1:36:20.62
C1 (11,80 km)	Alina Kovaleva (RUS)	1:07:10.56	Lili Matkovics (HUN)	1:07:21.15	Not awarded	
K2 (19,00 km)	No race					

== Medal table ==
* Host nation (Russia)

Rank	Nation	Gold	Silver	Bronze	Total
1	Hungary (HUN)	7	7	5	19
2	Portugal (POR)	4	2	1	7
3	France (FRA)	1	2	1	4
4	Poland (POL)	1	0	4	5
5	Serbia (SRB)	1	0	1	2
6	Russia (RUS)*	0	3	1	4
7	Czech Republic (CZE)	0	0	1	1
Totals (7 entries)		14	14	14	42

== Participants ==
A total of 108 canoeists from the national teams of the following 9 countries was registered to compete at 2021 Canoe Marathon European Championships.

- Czech Republic (5)
- France (12)
- Hungary (39)
- Ireland (2)
- Poland (5)
- Portugal (12)
- Romania (4)
- Russia (28)
- Serbia (1)
