= 2025 Canoe Marathon European Championships =

International canoeing competition

- Location: Ponte de Lima, Portugal
- Dates: 4–8 June

The 2025 Canoe Marathon European Championships was held from 4 to 8 June 2025 in Ponte de Lima, Portugal.

== Medal table ==
* Host nation (Portugal)

Rank	Nation	Gold	Silver	Bronze	Total
1	Hungary (HUN)	8	9	3	20
2	Portugal (POR)*	4	4	1	9
3	Spain (ESP)	3	2	8	13
4	Great Britain (GBR)	2	2	1	5
5	Denmark (DEN)	2	0	1	3
6	Norway (NOR)	1	1	1	3
7	Italy (ITA)	1	0	3	4
8	Ukraine (UKR)	1	0	1	2
9	Germany (GER)	1	0	0	1
10	Poland (POL)	0	2	3	5
11	Ireland (IRL)	0	1	1	2
12	Czech Republic (CZE)	0	1	0	1
12	France (FRA)	0	1	0	1
Totals (13 entries)		23	23	23	69

== Medalists ==
=== Senior ===
Event	Gold		Silver		Bronze	
Men
K1 Short Race (3.40 km)	Fernando Pimenta (POR)	13:18.08	James Russell (GBR)	13:18.64	José Ramalho (POR)	13:19.29
C1 Short Race (3.40 km)	Jaime Duro (ESP)	15:10.58	Mateusz Zuchora (POL)	15:27.18	Mateusz Borgieł (POL)	15:30.90
K1 (29.80 km)	James Russell (GBR)	2:06:36.24	José Ramalho (POR)	2:06:37.58	Jon Vold (NOR)	2:06:38.79
C1 (22.60 km)	Manuel Campos (ESP)	1:48:53.39	Rui Lacerda (POR)	1:48:54.27	Fernando Busto (ESP)	1:49:10.78
K2 (29.80 km)	Portugal; Fernando Pimenta; José Ramalho	2:01:57.68	Hungary; Adrián Boros; Tamás Erdélyi	2:01:59.87	Spain; Miguel Llorens; Alberto Plaza	2:02:02.87
C2 (22.60 km)	Portugal; Rui Lacerda; Ricardo Coelho	1:40:37.32	Spain; Jaime Duro; Óscar Graña	1:42:02.01	Spain; Manuel Campos; Diego Romero	1:43:55.53
Women
K1 Short Race (3.40 km)	Vanda Kiszli (HUN)	14:54.99	Anna Sletsjøe (NOR)	14:59.13	Pernille Hostrup (DEN)	15:04.26
C1 Short Race (3.40 km)	Annette Wehrmann (GER)	17:37.19	Yseline Huet (FRA)	17:51.38	Olena Tsyhankova (UKR)	17:57.21
K1 (26.20 km)	Anna Sletsjøe (NOR)	2:05:24.51	Vanda Kiszli (HUN)	2:05:35.11	Panna Csépe (HUN)	2:05:56.48
C1 (15.40 km)	Olena Tsyhankova (UKR)	1:24:49.71	Lili Matkovics (HUN)	1:24:55.37	Zsófia Kisbán (HUN)	1:25:46.22
K2 (26.20 km)	Hungary; Zsófia Szerafin; Vanda Kiszli	1:58:52.88	Hungary; Panna Sinkó; Panna Csépe	1:58:58.90	Spain; Irati Osa; Eva Barrios	1:59:08.70

=== Under 23 ===
Event	Gold		Silver		Bronze	
Men
K1 (26.20 km)	Philip Knudsen (DEN)	1:53:33.15	Francisco Dos Santos (ESP)	1:53:39.73	Izan Aliaga (ESP)	1:53:41.17
C1 (19.00 km)	Mihály Pluzsik (HUN)	1:34:54.83	Eryk Wilga (POL)	1:35:08.87	Darío Sánchez (ESP)	1:35:41.02
Women
K1 (22.60 km)	Pernille Hostrup (DEN)	1:49:20.78	Panna Csépe (HUN)	1:49:22.09	Alba Esteban (ESP)	1:49:40.60
C1 (11.80 km)	Lili Matkovics (HUN)	1:08:10.91	Tereza Kodetová (CZE)	1:09:33.79	Agata Kowalak (POL)	1:10:59.68

=== Junior ===
Event	Gold		Silver		Bronze	
Men
K1 Short Race (3.40 km)	William Short (GBR)	13:53.77	Sean Butterly (IRL)	14:02.83	Jaime Escuder (ESP)	14:10.20
C1 (15.40 km)	Leonardo Barbosa (POR)	1:20:02.39	Héctor Vázquez (ESP)	1:20:47.22	Alex Wilga (POL)	1:21:12.81
K1 (22.60 km)	Leonardo Candela (ITA)	1:38:45.33	William Short (GBR)	1:38:50.28	Sean Butterly (IRL)	1:38:56.74
K2 (22.60 km)	Hungary; Zaránd Lánczi; Kevin Budai	1:32:57.67	Hungary; Hunor Mayer; Ármin Pálinkás	1:33:08.53	Great Britain; William Short; Alexander Worgan	1:34:50.62
C2 (15.40 km)	Spain; Jaser Silva; Héctor Vázquez	1:15:35.61	Hungary; Mate Tosa lles Hancz	1:16:12.10	Spain; Álex Barreiro; Matteo Lago	1:16:28.13
Women
K1 Short Race (3.40 km)	Lotti Jambor (HUN)	15:38.27	Janka Reisz (HUN)	15:43.11	Cecilia Abascia (ITA)	15:49.73
K1 (19.00 km)	Lotti Jambor (HUN)	1:32:58.35	Janka Reisz (HUN)	1:33:55.15	Cecilia Abascia (ITA)	1:34:19.32
C1 (11.80 km)	Lucía Pizarro (ESP)	1:08:59.34	Lara Lopes (POR)	1:09:36.73	Nora Fekete (HUN)	1:10:13.79
K2 (19.00 km)	Hungary; Panni Hudi-Kadler; Panka Zatykó	1:27:29.97	Hungary; Lotti Jambor; Réka Katona	1:27:38.87	Italy; Cecilia Abascia; Irina Kolobova	1:29:50.59

=== Paracanoe ===
Event	Gold		Silver		Bronze	
Men's Open (11.80 km)	Sebastian Girke; Germany	1:05:31.23	Stefan Glawe; Germany	1:15:48.56	Ricardo Esteves; France	1:17:03.42
Men's KL1 (11.80 km)	Alex Santos; Portugal	1:12:09.84	Floriano Jesus; Portugal	1:14:57.54	Only 2 partisipants	
Men's KL2 (11.80 km)	Jonathan White; Great Britain	1:13:06.94	Norberto Mourão; Portugal	1:14:21.66	Frederik Sondergaard; Denmark	1:19:57.83
Men's KL3 (11.80 km)	Serhii Yemelianov; Georgia	1:08:24.25	Timothy Lodge; Great Britain	1:10:01.64	Yves Grondin; France	1:10:31.59
Men's VL2 (11.80 km)	Norberto Mourão; Portugal	1:14:09.84	Shaun Cook; Great Britain	1:19:20.34	Only 2 partisipants	
Women's Open (11.80 km)	Leona Johs; Germany	1:19:16.36	Only 1 partisipants			
Women's KL3 (8.20 km)	Charlotte Creamer; Great Britain	57:20.41	Coline Grabinski; France	1:06:42.97	Only 2 partisipants	
