= Lizzie Broughton =

British canoeist

Personal information
- Nationality: British
- Born: 5 March 1988 (age 38)

Sport
- Country: Great Britain
- Sport: Sprint kayak Canoe marathon
Medal record
Representing Great Britain
Women's sprint kayak
World Championships
Gold medal – first place	2018 Montemor-o-Velho	K-1 5000 m
Silver medal – second place	2018 Montemor-o-Velho	K-1 1000 m
Silver medal – second place	2021 Copenhagen	K-1 1000 m
Bronze medal – third place	2019 Szeged	K-1 1000 m
Bronze medal – third place	2021 Copenhagen	K-1 5000 m
Women's canoe marathon
World Championships
Silver medal – second place	2014 Oklahoma City	K-1
Silver medal – second place	2021 Pitești	K-1 short race
Bronze medal – third place	2019 Shaoxing	K-1
Bronze medal – third place	2021 Pitești	K-1
European Championships
Gold medal – first place	2013 Vila Verde	K-2
Silver medal – second place	2014 Piešťany	K-1
Silver medal – second place	2015 Bohinj	K-1
Bronze medal – third place	2014 Piešťany	K-2
Bronze medal – third place	2016 Pontevedra	K-2
Bronze medal – third place	2018 Metković	K-1
Bronze medal – third place	2019 Decize	K-1 short race

Lizzie Broughton (born 5 March 1988) is a British sprint canoeist. She competes primarily in canoe marathon, a sport in which she has won several international medals (including K-1 silver at the 2014 World Championships).

In recent years, she has also enjoyed success in canoe sprint, including gold and silver medals in the 2018 World Championships.
