= 2018 Canoe Marathon European Championships =

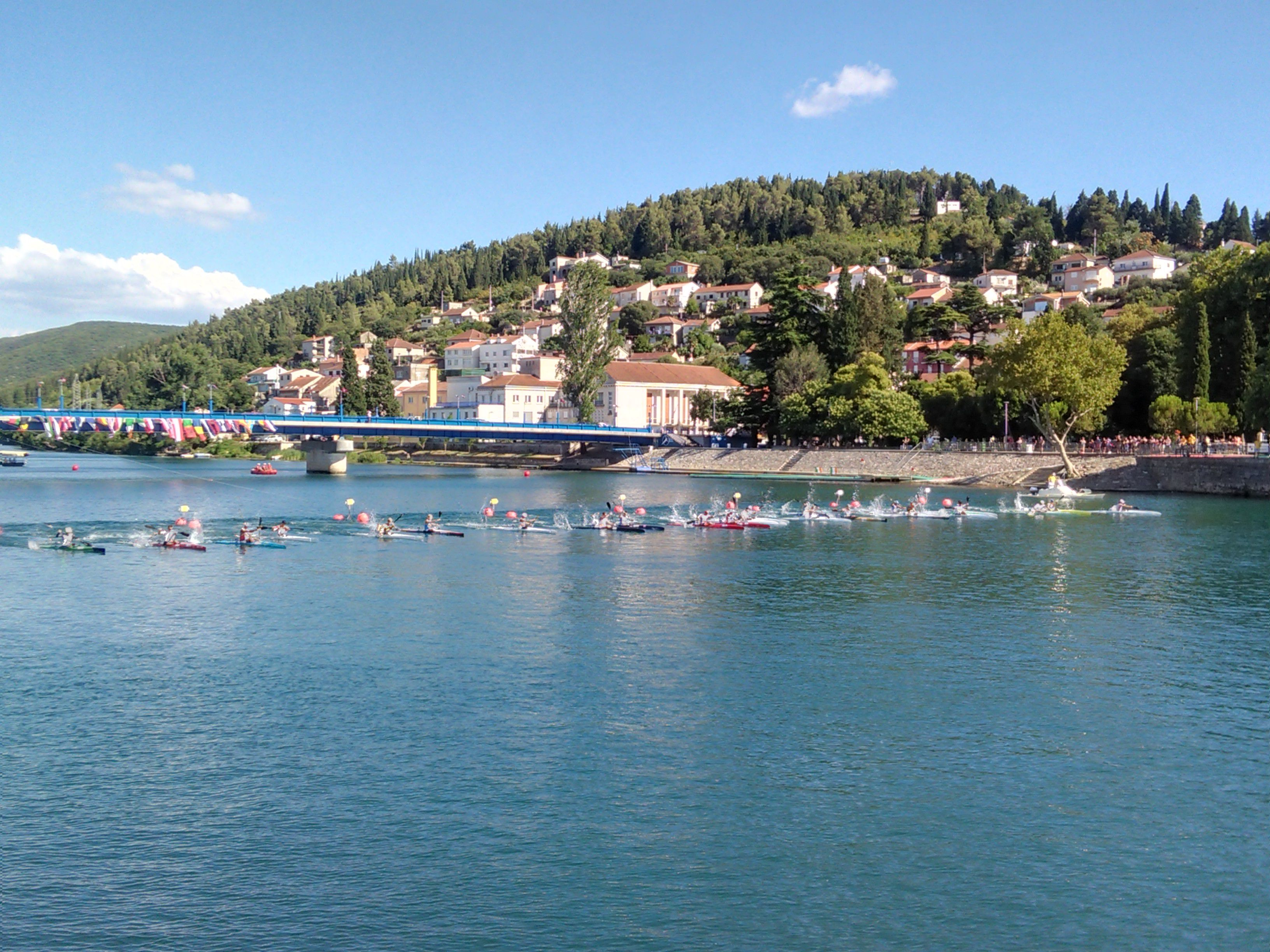
Lučki most (Harbour bridge), starting point of Championship

The 2018 Canoe Marathon European Championships is the fifteenth edition of the Canoe Marathon European Championships, which took place between 5 and 8 July 2018 at Metković, Croatia. The competition consisted of seventeen events – ten in kayak and seven in canoe – divided into junior, under–23 and senior categories.

== Medalists ==
=== Seniors ===
Event	Gold	Time	Silver	Time	Bronze	Time
Men's C-1	Manuel Campos (ESP)	2:03:20.89	Rui Lacerda (POR)	2:04:01.50	Jakub Brezina (CZE)	2:05:31.22
Men's C-2	Spain (ESP); Diego Romero; Óscar Graña	1:55:33.46	Poland (POL); Mateusz Borgiel; Mateusz Zuchora	1:55:48.89	Hungary (HUN); Dániel Laczó; Gergely Nagy	1:55:54.02
Men's K-1	José Ramalho (POR)	2:05:35.92	Adrián Boros (HUN)	2:05:49.30	Krisztián Máthé (HUN)	2:05:50.07
Men's K-2	Hungary (HUN); Adrián Boros; László Solti	1:54:46.36	France (FRA); Lucas Edwin; Stéphane Boulanger	1:55:13.97	Spain (ESP); José Julián; Miguel Fernández	1:55:16.82
Women's C-1	Liudmyla Babak (UKR)	1:22:50.38	Vanesa Tot (CRO)	1:24:28.41	Mariia Honcharova (UKR)	1:24:35.06
Women's K-1	Renáta Csay (HUN)	1:58:34.20	Zsófia Czéllai-Vörös (HUN)	1:59:40.43	Lizzie Broughton (GBR)	2:00:24.78
Women's K-2	Hungary (HUN); Vanda Kiszli; Sára Mihalik	1:53:25.85	Hungary (HUN); Renáta Csay; Alexandra Bara	1:53:36.17	Spain (ESP); Eva Barrios; Amaia Osaba	1:56:02.36

=== Under 23 ===
Event	Gold	Time	Silver	Time	Bronze	Time
Men's C-1	Mateusz Borgiel (POL)	1:46:48.04	Patryk Gluza (POL)	1:47:15.62	Sérgio Maciel (POR)	1:47:50.12
Men's K-1	Nico Paufler (GER)	1:51:30.60	Marcel Paufler (GER)	1:52:12.13	Mads Pedersen (DEN)	1:54:11.07
Women's K-1	Zsófia Czéllai-Vörös (HUN)	1:43:34.94	Sára Mihalik (HUN)	1:46:02.10	Samantha Rees-Clark (GBR)	1:47:25.65

=== Juniors ===
Event	Gold	Time	Silver	Time	Bronze	Time
Men's C-1	Jordán Fajta (HUN)	1:35:04.25	Adrian Klos (POL)	1:35:20.22	Márton Horváth (HUN)	1:37:04.67
Men's C-2	Hungary (HUN); Zoltán Vass; Bence Bucsi	1:28:29.72	Portugal (POR); Leonardo Vicente; Rodrigo Amaral	1:29:42.30	Poland (POL); Adrian Klos; Grzegorz Ludwiczak	1:30:26.00
Men's K-1	Ronan Foley (IRL)	1:41:02.63	Thorbjørn Rask (DEN)	1:41:19.13	Vince Petró (HUN)	1:41:20.89
Men's K-2	Hungary (HUN); Marcell Mercz; Ádám Horváth	1:34:23.04	France (FRA); Briac Labbe; Lois Mille	1:34:44.15	Great Britain (GBR); William Scammell; James Bell	1:34:48.87
Women's C-1	Dóra Horányi (HUN)	1:03:26.78	Adrianna Antos (POL)	1:05:14.66	Zsófia Csorba (HUN)	1:05:44.72
Women's K-1	Emma Russell (GBR)	1:30:23.91	Viktória Nagy (HUN)	1:30:25.00	Joke Plas (BEL)	1:31:02.58
Women's K-2	Hungary (HUN); Viktória Tófalvi; Csilla Rugási	1:22:56.05	Italy (ITA); Teresa Isotta; Petra Giuliano	1:22:57.48	Hungary (HUN); Viktória Nagy; Zsófia Bartos	1:24:38.95

== Medal table ==
Rank	Nation	Gold	Silver	Bronze	Total
1	Hungary (HUN)	9	5	6	20
2	Spain (ESP)	2	0	2	4
3	Poland (POL)	1	4	1	6
4	Portugal (POR)	1	2	1	4
5	Germany (GER)	1	1	0	2
6	Great Britain (GBR)	1	0	3	4
7	Ukraine (UKR)	1	0	1	2
8	Ireland (IRL)	1	0	0	1
9	France (FRA)	0	2	0	2
10	Denmark (DEN)	0	1	1	2
11	Croatia (CRO)	0	1	0	1
11	Italy (ITA)	0	1	0	1
13	Belgium (BEL)	0	0	1	1
13	Czech Republic (CZE)	0	0	1	1
Totals (14 entries)		17	17	17	51
