= Ivan Lawler =

British canoeist

Ivan Lawler MBE
Personal information
- Born: 19 November 1966 (age 59)
Medal record
Representing United Kingdom
Men's canoe sprint
World Championships
Gold medal – first place	1990 Poznań	K-2 10000 m
Silver medal – second place	1989 Plovdiv	K-2 10000 m
Men's canoe marathon
World Championships
Gold medal – first place	1992 Brisbane	K-1
Gold medal – first place	1994 Amsterdam	K-2
Gold medal – first place	1996 Vaxholm	K-2
Gold medal – first place	1998 Cape Town	K-1
Gold medal – first place	1999 Győr	K-1
Silver medal – second place	1988 Nottingham	K-2
Silver medal – second place	1990 Copenhagen	K-2
European Championship
Bronze medal – third place	1997 Pavia	K-2

Ivan Lawler MBE (born 19 November 1966) is a British marathon canoeist who competed from the late 1980s to the late 1990s, winning five gold and two silver medals at the canoe marathon world championships.

== Early life ==
In 1992 he was an interior decorator from Staines-upon-Thames. His older sister is canoeist Janine Lawler.

== Career ==
He also competed in canoe sprint, and won two medals in the K-2 10000 m event at the ICF Canoe Sprint World Championships with a gold (1990) and a silver (K-2 10000 m: 1989). At club level, he has always competed for Elmbridge canoe club.

Lawler also competed in three Summer Olympics, but did not advance to the final in any of the Games he competed in. His most notable was sixth in the semifinal round of the K-2 500 m event at Seoul in 1988. In 2011, Lawler attempted to break the long-standing record time in the Devizes to Westminster International Canoe Marathon with current world champion Ben Brown. However, they were unsuccessful and retired from the race due to injury and poor flow on the Thames.

He now owns and operates "Ultimate Kayaks", selling new and used Nelo and Epic kayaks including those of Olympic athletes who chose not to take their kayaks home. He also plays a key role in the coaching system at Elmbridge canoe club.

Lawler's latest achievement comes in the form of setting the new Great Glen Paddle course record of 8hrs 1min on 22 March 2014.

In March 2017 he was elected President of British Canoeing, the sport's national governing body.

He was appointed Member of the Order of the British Empire (MBE) in the 2000 New Year Honours for services to canoeing.

Lawler completed his studies at the London School of Osteopathy in 1997 and has been a registered osteopath since 2000.
