= 2018 ICF Canoe Sprint World Championships – Women's K-1 1000 metres =

Women's K-1 1000 metres at the 2018 ICF Canoe Sprint World Championships
- Venue: Centro de Alto Rendimento de Montemor-o-Velho
- Location: Montemor-o-Velho, Portugal
- Dates: 23–24 August
- Competitors: 20 from 20 nations
- Winning time: 4:02.892

Medalists
| gold medal | Dóra Bodonyi | Hungary |
| silver medal | Lizzie Broughton | Great Britain |
| bronze medal | Bridgitte Hartley | South Africa |

The women's K-1 1000 metres competition at the 2018 ICF Canoe Sprint World Championships in Montemor-o-Velho took place at the Centro de Alto Rendimento de Montemor-o-Velho.

== Schedule ==
The schedule was as follows:

| Date | Time | Round |
|---|---|---|
| Thursday 23 August 2018 | 15:21 | Heats |
| Friday 24 August 2018 | 11:35 | Semifinals |
| Friday 24 August 2018 | 15:04 | Final B |
| Friday 24 August 2018 | 15:54 | Final A |

All times are Western European Summer Time (UTC+1)

== Results ==
=== Heats ===
Heat winners advanced directly to the A final. The next six fastest boats in each heat advanced to the semifinals.

==== Heat 1 ====
| Rank | Kayaker | Country | Time | Notes |
|---|---|---|---|---|
| 1 | Alyssa Bull | Australia | 4:14.873 | QA |
| 2 | Edyta Dzieniszewska-Kierkla | Poland | 4:17.088 | QS |
| 3 | Marija Dostanić | Serbia | 4:20.198 | QS |
| 4 | Inna Hryshchun | Ukraine | 4:21.258 | QS |
| 5 | Eva Barrios | Spain | 4:24.513 | QS |
| 6 | Dariya Baicheuskaya | Belarus | 4:34.384 | QS |
| 7 | Mafalda Germano | Portugal | 4:42.564 | QS |

==== Heat 2 ====
| Rank | Kayaker | Country | Time | Notes |
|---|---|---|---|---|
| 1 | Dóra Bodonyi | Hungary | 4:14.064 | QA |
| 2 | Netta Malinen | Finland | 4:16.619 | QS |
| 3 | Rebecca Cole | New Zealand | 4:16.869 | QS |
| 4 | Julia Lagerstam | Sweden | 4:16.944 | QS |
| 5 | Anastasia Panchenko | Russia | 4:20.794 | QS |
| 6 | Ana Paula Vergutz | Brazil | 4:21.674 | QS |
| 7 | Laura Skukauska | Latvia | 4:32.600 | QS |

==== Heat 3 ====
| Rank | Kayaker | Country | Time | Notes |
|---|---|---|---|---|
| 1 | Nina Krankemann | Germany | 4:11.714 | QA |
| 2 | Lizzie Broughton | Great Britain | 4:14.994 | QS |
| 3 | Sarah Troël | France | 4:15.744 | QS |
| 4 | Bridgitte Hartley | South Africa | 4:16.569 | QS |
| 5 | Anna Kožíšková | Czech Republic | 4:26.565 | QS |
| 6 | Franziska Widmer | Switzerland | 4:31.990 | QS |

=== Semifinals ===
Qualification was as follows:

The fastest three boats in each semi advanced to the A final.
The next four fastest boats in each semi, plus the fastest remaining boat advanced to the B final.

==== Semifinal 1 ====
| Rank | Kayaker | Country | Time | Notes |
|---|---|---|---|---|
| 1 | Bridgitte Hartley | South Africa | 4:05.535 | QA |
| 2 | Inna Hryshchun | Ukraine | 4:06.120 | QA |
| 3 | Anastasia Panchenko | Russia | 4:07.245 | QA |
| 4 | Sarah Troël | France | 4:07.470 | QB |
| 5 | Rebecca Cole | New Zealand | 4:07.480 | QB |
| 6 | Dariya Baicheuskaya | Belarus | 4:12.420 | QB |
| 7 | Edyta Dzieniszewska-Kierkla | Poland | 4:12.645 | QB |
| 8 | Laura Skukauska | Latvia | 4:22.450 | qB |
| 9 | Franziska Widmer | Switzerland | 4:25.652 | |

==== Semifinal 2 ====
| Rank | Kayaker | Country | Time | Notes |
|---|---|---|---|---|
| 1 | Netta Malinen | Finland | 4:10.468 | QA |
| 2 | Lizzie Broughton | Great Britain | 4:10.498 | QA |
| 3 | Anna Kožíšková | Czech Republic | 4:11.028 | QA |
| 4 | Julia Lagerstam | Sweden | 4:13.228 | QB |
| 5 | Marija Dostanić | Serbia | 4:15.663 | QB |
| 6 | Eva Barrios | Spain | 4:19.193 | QB |
| 7 | Mafalda Germano | Portugal | 4:27.854 | QB |
| 8 | Ana Paula Vergutz | Brazil | 4:47.135 | |

=== Finals ===
==== Final B ====
Competitors in this final raced for positions 10 to 18.

| Rank | Kayaker | Country | Time |
|---|---|---|---|
| 1 | Edyta Dzieniszewska-Kierkla | Poland | 4:01.994 |
| 2 | Eva Barrios | Spain | 4:08.519 |
| 3 | Rebecca Cole | New Zealand | 4:08.754 |
| 4 | Sarah Troël | France | 4:08.929 |
| 5 | Julia Lagerstam | Sweden | 4:11.059 |
| 6 | Marija Dostanić | Serbia | 4:19.365 |
| 7 | Laura Skukauska | Latvia | 4:22.125 |
| 8 | Dariya Baicheuskaya | Belarus | 4:22.210 |
| 9 | Mafalda Germano | Portugal | 4:28.750 |

==== Final A ====
Competitors in this final raced for positions 1 to 9, with medals going to the top three.

| Rank | Kayaker | Country | Time |
|---|---|---|---|
| 1st place, gold medalist(s) | Dóra Bodonyi | Hungary | 4:02.892 |
| 2nd place, silver medalist(s) | Lizzie Broughton | Great Britain | 4:03.927 |
| 3rd place, bronze medalist(s) | Bridgitte Hartley | South Africa | 4:04.017 |
| 4 | Nina Krankemann | Germany | 4:04.662 |
| 5 | Anastasia Panchenko | Russia | 4:09.423 |
| 6 | Inna Hryshchun | Ukraine | 4:12.313 |
| 7 | Alyssa Bull | Australia | 4:12.333 |
| 8 | Netta Malinen | Finland | 4:16.348 |
| 9 | Anna Kožíšková | Czech Republic | 4:17.438 |
