= 2017 ICF Canoe Sprint World Championships – Men's K-1 5000 metres =

Men's K-1 5000 metres at the 2017 ICF Canoe Sprint World Championships
- Venue: Sportcentrum Račice
- Location: Račice, Czech Republic
- Dates: 27 August
- Competitors: 37 from 37 nations
- Winning time: 20:46.907

Medalists
gold medal	Fernando Pimenta	Portugal
silver medal	Max Hoff	Germany
bronze medal	Aleh Yurenia	Belarus

The men's K-1 5000 metres competition at the 2017 ICF Canoe Sprint World Championships in Račice took place at the Sportcentrum Račice.

== Schedule ==
The schedule was as follows:

Date	Time	Round
Sunday 27 August 2017	15:40	Final

All times are Central European Summer Time (UTC+2)

== Results ==
As a long-distance event, it was held as a direct final.

Rank	Kayaker	Country	Time
1st place, gold medalist(s)	Fernando Pimenta	Portugal	20:46.907
2nd place, silver medalist(s)	Max Hoff	Germany	20:50.259
3rd place, bronze medalist(s)	Aleh Yurenia	Belarus	21:00.828
4	Kenny Wallace	Australia	21:01.738
5	Rubén Millán	Spain	21:11.875
6	Eivind Vold	Norway	21:31.817
7	Magnus Gregory	Great Britain	21:39.570
8	Nikolay Chervov	Russia	21:40.265
9	Sean Rice	South Africa	21:43.049
10	Rafał Rosolski	Poland	21:51.191
11	Jošt Zakrajšek	Slovenia	22:00.791
12	Martin Nathell	Sweden	22:04.280
13	Jakub Zavřel	Czech Republic	22:09.896
14	Artuur Peters	Belgium	22:11.317
15	Fabio Wyss	Switzerland	22:11.517
16	René Holten Poulsen	Denmark	22:24.033
17	Cyrille Carré	France	22:26.317
18	Bálint Noé	Hungary	22:27.601
19	Christoph Kornfeind	Austria	22:28.412
20	Marek Krajčovič	Slovakia	22:49.301
21	Aldis Arturs Vilde	Latvia	22:49.565
22	Vitaliy Tsurkan	Ukraine	22:50.396
23	Mohamed Mrabet	Tunisia	23:02.470
24	Yasuhiro Suzuki	Japan	23:05.880
25	Javier López Quintero	Mexico	23:09.912
26	Marshall Hughes	Canada	23:36.201
27	Yavuz Selim Balci	Turkey	23:37.922
28	Jeremy Hakala	Finland	23:44.328
29	Maksim Bondar	Kyrgyzstan	23:52.922
30	Albert Raj Selvaraj	India	24:03.286
31	Li Fu	China	24:19.233
–	Ali Aghamirzaei	Iran	DNF
–	Mirnazim Javadov	Azerbaijan	DNF
–	Hristo Rekov	Bulgaria	DNF
–	Ilya Golendov	Kazakhstan	DNF
–	Giulio Dressino	Italy	DNF
–	Matti Stern	Israel	DNF
