= Santiago Guerrero Gutiérrez =

Mexican politician

- Born: 7 May 1949 (age 77); Copala, Guerrero, Mexico
- Occupation: Politician
- Political party: PRI

Santiago Guerrero Gutiérrez (born 7 May 1949) is a Mexican politician from the Institutional Revolutionary Party (PRI). In the 2000 general election he was elected to the Chamber of Deputies to represent the eighth district of Guerrero during the 58th session of Congress. He also served in the Congress of Guerrero.
