= Pál Pétervári =

Hungarian canoeist

Medal record

Men's canoe sprint

World Championships
| Gold medal – first place | 1991 Paris | C-2 10000 m |
| Silver medal – second place | 1987 Duisburg | C-2 10000 m |

Men's canoe marathon

World Championships
| Gold medal – first place | 1988 Nottingham | C-1 |
| Gold medal – first place | 1998 Cape Town | C-1 |
| Gold medal – first place | 1999 Győr | C-1 |
| Silver medal – second place | 1990 Copenhagen | C-1 |
| Silver medal – second place | 1992 Brisbane | C-1 |
| Silver medal – second place | 2001 Stockton-on-Tees | C-1 |
| Bronze medal – third place | 1996 Vaxholm | C-1 |
| Bronze medal – third place | 2000 Dartmouth | C-1 |

Pál Pétervári is a Hungarian sprint canoer who competed in the late 1980s and early 1990s. He won two medals in the C-2 10000 m event with a gold in 1991 and a silver in 1987. Bendegúz Pétervári-Molnár is his nephew and Zoltán Molnár is his brother-in-law; both are Olympic rowers.
