= Márton Kövér =

Hungarian canoeist (born 1987)

Personal information
- Born: 24 October 1987 (age 38) Budapest, Hungary

Sport
- Country: Hungary
- Sport: Canoe marathon
- Event: C-1,C-2
Medal record
Representing Hungary
Men's canoe marathon
Event	1st	2nd	3rd
World Championships	9	5	3
European Championships	4	6	1
Total	13	11	4
World Championships
Gold medal – first place	2011 Singapore	C-2
Gold medal – first place	2013 Copenhagen	C-1
Gold medal – first place	2014 Oklahoma City	C-2
Gold medal – first place	2015 Győr	C-1
Gold medal – first place	2015 Győr	C-2
Gold medal – first place	2016 Brandenburg an der Havel	C-1
Gold medal – first place	2016 Brandenburg an der Havel	C-2
Gold medal – first place	2017 Pietermaritzburg	C-1
Gold medal – first place	2017 Pietermaritzburg	C-2
Silver medal – second place	2012 Rome	C-2
Silver medal – second place	2014 Oklahoma City	C-1
Silver medal – second place	2021 Pitești	C-1
Silver medal – second place	2022 Ponte de Lima	C-1
Silver medal – second place	2023 Vejen	C-1
Bronze medal – third place	2010 Banyoles	C-2
Bronze medal – third place	2013 Copenhagen	C-2
Bronze medal – third place	2021 Pitești	C-2
European Championships
Gold medal – first place	2015 Bohinj	C-1
Gold medal – first place	2015 Bohinj	C-2
Gold medal – first place	2017 Ponte de Lima	C-1
Gold medal – first place	2021 Moscow	C-1
Silver medal – second place	2013 Vila Verde	C-2
Silver medal – second place	2014 Piešťany	C-1
Silver medal – second place	2016 Pontevedra	C-1
Silver medal – second place	2017 Ponte de Lima	C-2
Silver medal – second place	2019 Decize	C-2
Silver medal – second place	2021 Moscow	C-2
Bronze medal – third place	2016 Pontevedra	C-2

Márton Kövér (born 24 October 1987) is a Hungarian marathon canoeist and standup paddleboarder. He is a nine-time World Champion.

== Career ==
Kövér is a nine-time Canoe Marathon World Champion, winning four C-1 championships and five C-2 championships. He won four consecutive C-2 championships with Ádám Dóczé from 2014 to 2017.

In October 2019, he competed at the inaugural ICF Stand Up Paddling World Championships. He won his first Stand Up Paddling medal in 2021, a silver medal. In October 2021, he returned to the 2021 ICF Canoe Marathon World Championships and won a silver medal in C-1 event with a time of 2:03:07.70.

He competed in the 2024 ICF Dragon Boat World Championships and won a gold medal in the mixed 10-seater 2000 metres event.
