= Shaun Rubenstein =

South African canoeist

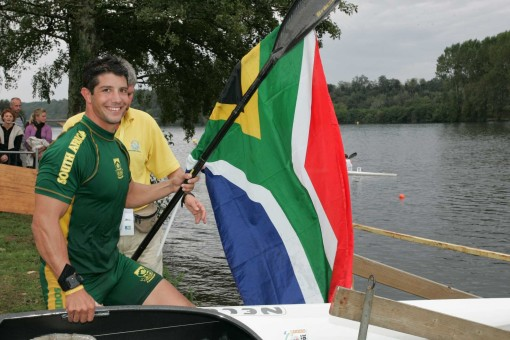
- Rubenstein celebrating after the World Marathon Champs 2006 K1 event

Medal record

Men's canoe marathon

Representing South Africa

World Championships
| Gold medal – first place | 2006 Tremolat | K-1 |
| Silver medal – second place | 2006 Tremolat | K-2 |
| Silver medal – second place | 2009 Gaia | K-2 |

Shaun Rubenstein (born 5 November 1983 in Johannesburg, Gauteng) is a South African canoer and Olympian.

== Career ==
As a junior canoeist, Rubenstein competed in all forms of the sport, from sprints to river marathons. He was a member of the South African junior sprint and flat-water marathon teams, competing internationally. His best junior result was at the 2001 World Marathon Champs where he won a bronze medal in the K-1 event.

He has been competing internationally at senior level since 2002.

=== World Marathon Championships ===
In September 2006 at the World Marathon Championships in Tremolat, Shaun competed in both the K-1 event, where he won the gold medal, and the K2 event, where he won the silver medal with his partner Shaun Biggs, over Marathon legend Manual Busto Fernandes and his K2 partner Emilio Merchan Alonso. Two years prior in 2004 Shaun placed third at the ICF Canoe Marathon World Championships in Bergen, Norway.

=== Beijing Olympics 2008 ===
Rubenstein competed at the 2008 Summer Olympics in Beijing, but was eliminated in the semi-finals of both the K-1 500 m and the K-1 1000 m events.

== See also ==
- List of select Jewish canoers
