= José Ramalho (canoeist) =

Portuguese canoeist (born 1982)

Personal information
- Born: 11 August 1982 (age 44)

Sport
- Country: Portugal
- Sport: Canoe marathon
- Events: K-1, K-1 short race, K-2
Medal record
Representing Portugal
Men's canoe marathon
Event	1st	2nd	3rd
World Championships	5	4	4
European Championships	9	6	2
Total	14	10	6
World Championships
Gold medal – first place	2021 Pitești	K-1 short race
Gold medal – first place	2022 Ponte de Lima	K-2
Gold medal – first place	2023 Vejen	K-2
Gold medal – first place	2024 Metković	K-2
Gold medal – first place	2025 Győr	K-2
Silver medal – second place	2012 Rome	K-1
Silver medal – second place	2019 Shaoxing	K-1
Silver medal – second place	2022 Ponte de Lima	K-1
Silver medal – second place	2024 Metković	K-1
Bronze medal – third place	2009 Gaia	K-1
Bronze medal – third place	2014 Oklahoma City	K-1
Bronze medal – third place	2016 Brandenburg an der Havel	K-1
Bronze medal – third place	2025 Győr	K-1 short race
European Championships
Gold medal – first place	2011 Saint-Jean-de-Losne	K-1
Gold medal – first place	2014 Piešťany	K-1
Gold medal – first place	2015 Bohinj	K-1
Gold medal – first place	2016 Pontevedra	K-1
Gold medal – first place	2017 Ponte de Lima	K-1
Gold medal – first place	2018 Metković	K-1
Gold medal – first place	2021 Moscow	K-1
Gold medal – first place	2021 Moscow	K-1 short race
Gold medal – first place	2025 Ponte de Lima	K-2
Silver medal – second place	2009 Ostróda	K-1
Silver medal – second place	2013 Vila Verde	K-1
Silver medal – second place	2021 Moscow	K-2
Silver medal – second place	2023 Slavonski Brod	K-1 short race
Silver medal – second place	2023 Slavonski Brod	K-2
Silver medal – second place	2025 Ponte de Lima	K-1
Bronze medal – third place	2022 Silkeborg	K-1
Bronze medal – third place	2025 Ponte de Lima	K-1 short race
World Games
Bronze medal – third place	2022 Birmingham	K-1 short race
Bronze medal – third place	2025 Chengdu	K-1
Bronze medal – third place	2025 Chengdu	K-1 short race

José Ramalho (born 11 August 1982) is a Portuguese marathon canoeist.

== Career ==
Ramalho made his ICF Canoe Marathon World Championships debut in 2009. In December 2019, he was named the technical coordinator at Clube Náutico de Prado. After 12 years, he won his first World Championship gold in 2021 in the K-1 short race with a time of 14:19.85.

In June 2025, he competed at the 2025 Canoe Marathon European Championships and won a gold medal in the K-2, a silver medal in the K-1, and a bronze medal in the K-1 short race. In August 2025, he competed at the 2025 World Games and won bronze medals in the K-1 short race and K-1 events. In September 2025, he competed at the 2025 ICF Canoe Marathon World Championships and won a gold medal in the K-2 event with a time of 1:54:00.62, and a bronze medal in the K-1 short race with a time of 13:47.38. This was his fourth consecutive K-2 championship with Fernando Pimenta.
