= Lars Koch =

Danish canoeist

Medal record

Representing Denmark

Men's canoe sprint

World Championships
Silver medal – second place	1987 Duisburg	K-2 10000 m
Bronze medal – third place	1985 Mechelen	K-4 10000 m

Men's canoe marathon

World Championships
Gold medal – first place	1988 Nottingham	K-2
Gold medal – first place	1990 Copenhagen	K-2
Gold medal – first place	1994 Amsterdam	K-1

Lars Koch is a Danish sprint and marathon canoeist who competed in the mid to late 1980s. He won two medals at the ICF Canoe Sprint World Championships with a silver (K-2 10000 m: 1987) and a bronze (K-4 10000 m: 1985).
