= London School of Osteopathy =

Osteopathic school in London, England

Coordinates: 51°29′47″N 0°04′53″W

The London School of Osteopathy (LSO) is an osteopathic school in Bethnal Green, London, England, that offers MOst / BOst (Hons) pathways, validated by Anglia Ruskin University (ARU). Through its partnership agreement with ARU, the LSO also has government (HEFCE) funding available for eligible students. The LSO is the only fully part-time osteopathic school to have a UK government funded integrated Masters programme in osteopathy.

== History ==
The LSO was founded in 1948 originally as the Croydon School of Osteopathy by Horace Jarvis. Its name was changed to the London School of Osteopathy in 1977.

Key dates

- 1892 Still founds the first American School of Osteopathy in Kirksville.
- 1898 J. Martin Littlejohn, a student of Still, introduces osteopathy to the UK.
- 1948 Croydon School of Osteopathy founded.
- 1977 The school is renamed the London School of Osteopathy.
- 1993 The LSO validated as a BSc (Hons) degree course.
- 1993 The Osteopaths Act is passed.
- 1998 General Osteopathic Council (GOsC) opens its register to osteopaths.
- 2000 LSO is the first fully part-time course to gain accreditation from the GOsC.
- 2002 Degree validation by The University of Brighton
- 2008 Publication of the QAA Benchmark Statement for Osteopathy.
- 2009 Validation of award to new integrated Master of Osteopathy degree (MOst) with Anglia Ruskin University
- 2012 Replaced mixed-mode description with part-time and full-time pathways
- 2013 New LSO osteopathic clinic in Bethnal Green opens
- 2014 LSO launches new full-time MOst degree course in addition to existing part-time degrees
- 2014 Anglia Ruskin University confirmed as the validating body for a further 5 years.
- 2017 Osteopathy is recognised by NHS England as an Allied Health Profession
- 2018 Accreditation inspection by the QAA resulted in unconditional approval for the LSO
- 2019 Anglia Ruskin University confirmed as the validating body for a further 5 years
- 2019 The first class of full-time MOst students graduate after joining LSO in 2014

== Clinics ==
The London School of Osteopathy teaching clinic is based in Bethnal Green. It is here students at the LSO undertake their practical training. Training in the clinic starts from a students first term of study. Over the course of their studies osteopathy students will spend at least 1000 hours training in the clinic. The London School of Osteopathy clinic offers treatment support to enhance the health of local residents and businesses. Appointments are available Monday - Saturday throughout the year. Osteopathic treatment is carried out by students under the supervision of fully qualified clinic tutors.

== Courses ==
Courses include:

- Osteopathy MOst full-time 4 year degree
- Osteopathy BOst full-time 3 ½ year degree
- Osteopathy MOst part-time (weekend study) over 5 or 6 years
- Osteopathy BOst part-time (weekend study) over 5 years

All students are initially enrolled on the MOst course. Students then have the option to choose to qualify with a BOst degree in their penultimate year of study.

The London School of Osteopathy is a registered Charity, whose objectives are:

‘the advancement of the science and practice of osteopathy for the public benefit and the education and training of persons in this subject.’
