= Maria Kazakova (canoeist) =

Russian canoeist

Personal information
- Full name: Maria Vyacheslavovna Kazakova
- Born: 2 July 1988 (age 38) Moscow, Russian SFSR, Soviet Union
Medal record
Representing Russia
Women's canoe sprint
World Championships
Silver medal – second place	2011 Szeged	C-1 200 m
Silver medal – second place	2015 Milan	C-2 500 m
Bronze medal – third place	2010 Poznań	C-1 200 m
European Championships
Gold medal – first place	2011 Belgrade	C-1 200 m
Gold medal – first place	2013 Montemor-o-Velho	C-1 200 m
Women's canoe marathon
European Championships
Silver medal – second place	2021 Moscow	C-1 short race
Silver medal – second place	2021 Moscow	C-1

Maria Vyacheslavovna Kazakova (Russian: Мария Вячеславовна Казакова; born 2 July 1988 in Moscow, Russian SFSR, Soviet Union) is a Russian sprint canoer who has competed since the late 2000s. She won the bronze medal in the C-1 200 m event at the 2010 ICF Canoe Sprint World Championships in Poznań. At the 2011 Canoe Sprint European Championships in Belgrade she won her first gold medal during the C-1 200m race.
