= Lani Belcher =

British canoeist (born 1989)

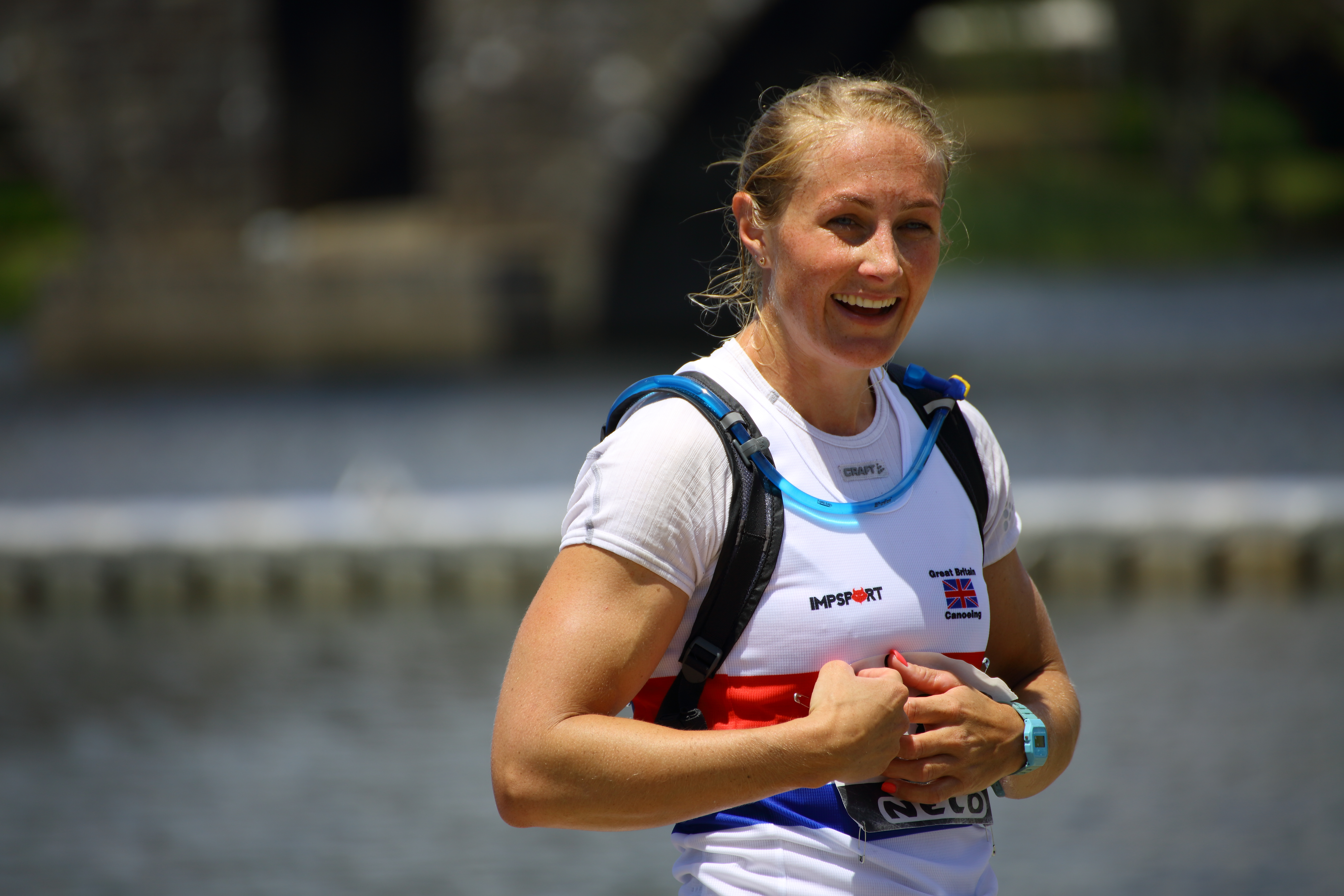

Personal information
- Nationality: British
- Born: 10 June 1989 (age 37) Cobram, Victoria, Australia

Sport
- Country: Great Britain
- Sport: Canoe sprint Canoe marathon
Medal record
Representing Australia
Women's canoe marathon
World Championships
Silver medal – second place	2008 Týn nad Vltavou	K-1
Representing Great Britain
Women's canoe sprint
World Championships
Silver medal – second place	2011 Szeged	K-1 5000 m
Silver medal – second place	2015 Milan	K-1 5000 m
Bronze medal – third place	2017 Račice	K-1 5000 m
European Games
Silver medal – second place	2015 Baku	K-1 5000 m
European Championships
Gold medal – first place	2010 Trasona	K-1 5000 m
Silver medal – second place	2011 Belgrade	K-1 5000 m
Women's canoe marathon
World Championships
Gold medal – first place	2017 Pietermaritzburg	K-1
Bronze medal – third place	2009 Gaia	K-1
Bronze medal – third place	2017 Pietermaritzburg	K-2

Lani Belcher (born 10 June 1989) is a British canoeist who previously represented Australia. She competed in the women's K-2 500 metres event at the 2016 Summer Olympics. Belcher won the Gold Medal in the 2017 Canoe Marathon World Championships in South Africa.

== Early life ==
Belcher was born in Cobram, Victoria, Australia in 1989, and lived in Brisbane. Belcher was a triathlete and a track cyclist before she took up kayaking. She began training at the Australian Institute of Sport's facilities in the Gold Coast. In 2007, Belcher moved to England and trained at Elmbridge Canoe Club. At the end of the following year, Belcher was released by the Australian team, allowing her to represent Great Britain.

== Career ==
At the 2016 Summer Olympics in Rio de Janeiro, Belcher finished in fifteenth place in the women's K-2 500 metres event, with her teammate Angela Hannah. Belcher and Hannah were included in the Olympics after teams representing Romania and Belarus were disqualified for doping.

In 2017, at the ICF Canoe Marathon World Championships in Pietermaritzburg, South Africa, Belcher won gold in the Women's K-1 event. It was Britain's first gold medal in the event in more than a decade.
