= Bertrand Hémonic =

French canoeist

Medal record

Men's canoe sprint

World Championships
Bronze medal – third place	2009 Dartmouth	C-1 4 x 200 m

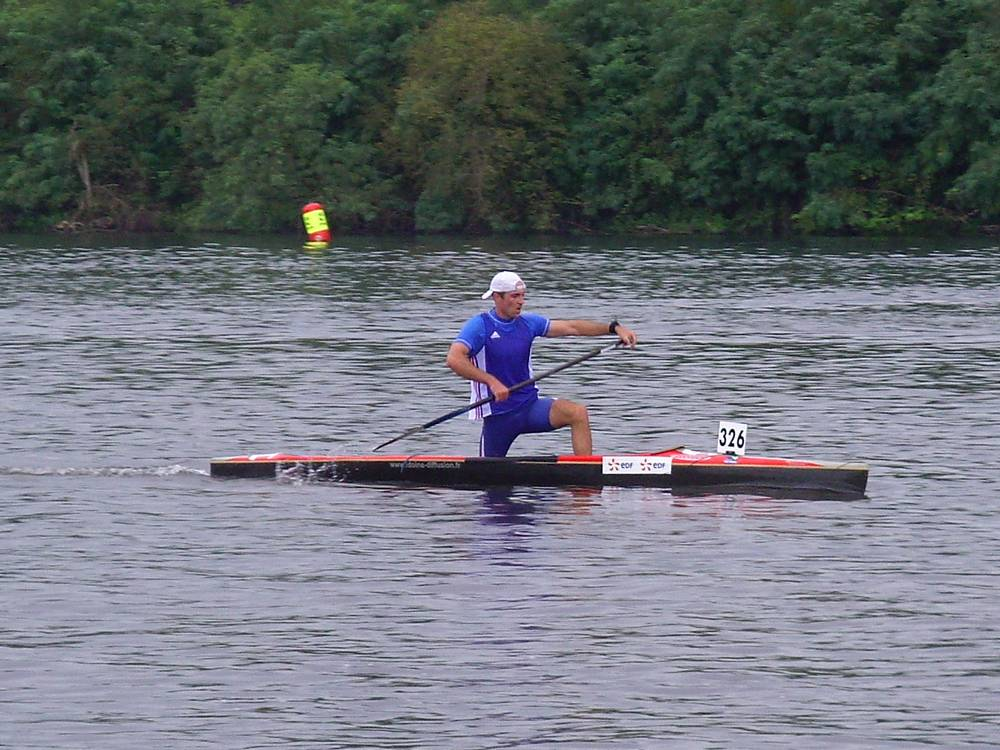
Bertrand Hemonic in 2006

Bertrand Hémonic (born 23 November 1979 in Pontivy) is a French sprint canoeist and marathon canoeist who has competed since the late 2000s.

== Career ==
He won a bronze medal in the C-1 4 x 200 m event at the 2009 ICF Canoe Sprint World Championships in Dartmouth. Hemonic also competed at the 2008 Summer Olympics. He was eliminated in the semifinals of both the C-2 500 m and the C-2 1000 m events.
