= István Gyulay =

Hungarian canoeist

Medal record

Men's canoe sprint

World Championships
Gold medal – first place	1991 Paris	C-2 10000 m

István Gyulay is a Hungarian sprint canoer and marathon canoeist who competed in the early 1990s. He won a gold medal in the C-2 10000 m event at the 1991 ICF Canoe Sprint World Championships in Paris.
