= Ádám Dóczé =

Hungarian canoeist (born 1992)

Sport
- Country: Hungary
- Sport: Canoe marathon
- Event: C-1,C-2
Medal record
Representing Hungary
Men's canoe marathon
World Championships
Gold medal – first place	2014 Oklahoma City	C-2
Gold medal – first place	2015 Győr	C-2
Gold medal – first place	2016 Brandenburg an der Havel	C-2
Gold medal – first place	2017 Pietermaritzburg	C-2
Bronze medal – third place	2018 Vila Verde	C-1
European Championships
Gold medal – first place	2015 Bohinj	C-2
Silver medal – second place	2017 Ponte de Lima	C-2
Silver medal – second place	2019 Decize	C-2
Bronze medal – third place	2016 Pontevedra	C-2

Ádám Dóczé is a Hungarian marathon canoeist.

== Career ==
Dóczé won four consecutive C-2 championships with Márton Kövér at the ICF Canoe Marathon World Championships from 2014 to 2017. During the 2016 Canoe Marathon World Championships, he won a gold medal with a broken leg he sustained six weeks prior to the competition. He competed at the 2018 ICF Canoe Marathon World Championships and won a bronze medal in the C-1 event with a time of 2:08:05.54.
