= Edvin Csabai =

Hungarian canoeist (born 1976)

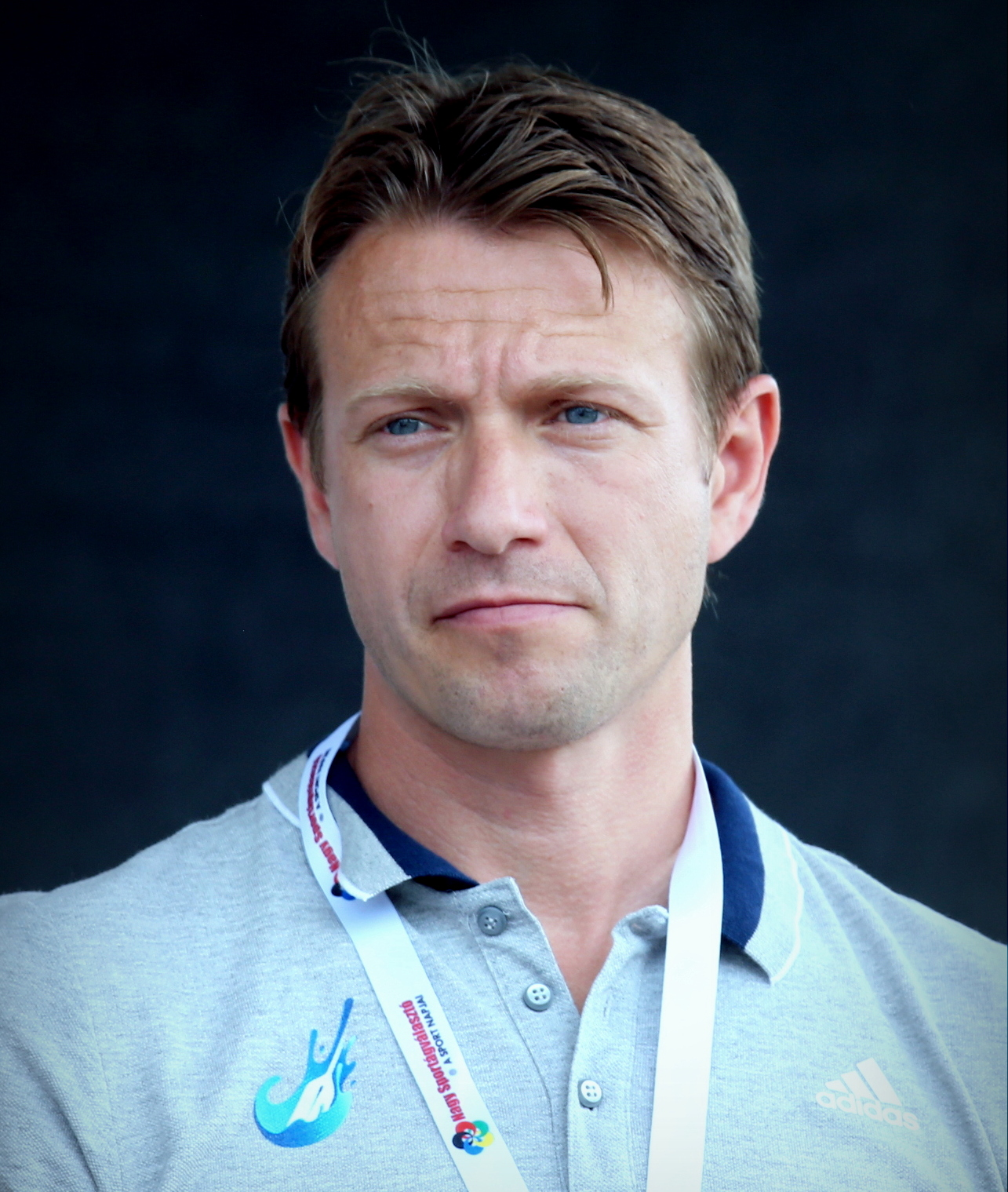

Personal information
- Born: 7 December 1976 (age 49) Budapest, Hungary

Sport
- Country: Hungary
- Sport: Canoe marathon
- Event: C-1, C-2
Medal record
Representing Hungary
Men's canoe marathon
World Championships
Gold medal – first place	1999 Győr	C-2
Gold medal – first place	2000 Dartmouth	C-2
Gold medal – first place	2001 Stockton-on-Tees	C-2
Gold medal – first place	2002 Zamora	C-2
Gold medal – first place	2003 Valladolid	C-2
Gold medal – first place	2004 Bergen	C-1
Gold medal – first place	2004 Bergen	C-2
Gold medal – first place	2005 Perth	C-1
Gold medal – first place	2005 Perth	C-2
Gold medal – first place	2006 Tremolat	C-1
Gold medal – first place	2006 Tremolat	C-2
Gold medal – first place	2007 Győr	C-1
Gold medal – first place	2007 Győr	C-2
Gold medal – first place	2008 Týn nad Vltavou	C-1
Gold medal – first place	2008 Týn nad Vltavou	C-2
Gold medal – first place	2009 Gaia	C-1
Gold medal – first place	2009 Gaia	C-2
Silver medal – second place	1998 Cape Town	C-2

Edwin Csabai (born 7 December 1976) is a former Hungarian marathon canoeist. He is a 17-time World Champion, the most successful male canoe marathon athlete in history.

== Career ==
In 2010, Csabai announced his retirement. He finished his career with 17 gold medals at the Canoe Marathon World Championships, becoming the most successful canoe marathon male athlete in history, trailing only Renáta Csay's record twenty gold medals. He won ten consecutive C-2 championships with Attila Györe from 1999 to 2008. He also won six consecutive C-1 championships from 2004 to 2009.

Following his retirement he was named the director of the Hungarian Kayak-Canoe Association in 2013.
