= Hank McGregor =

South African canoeist

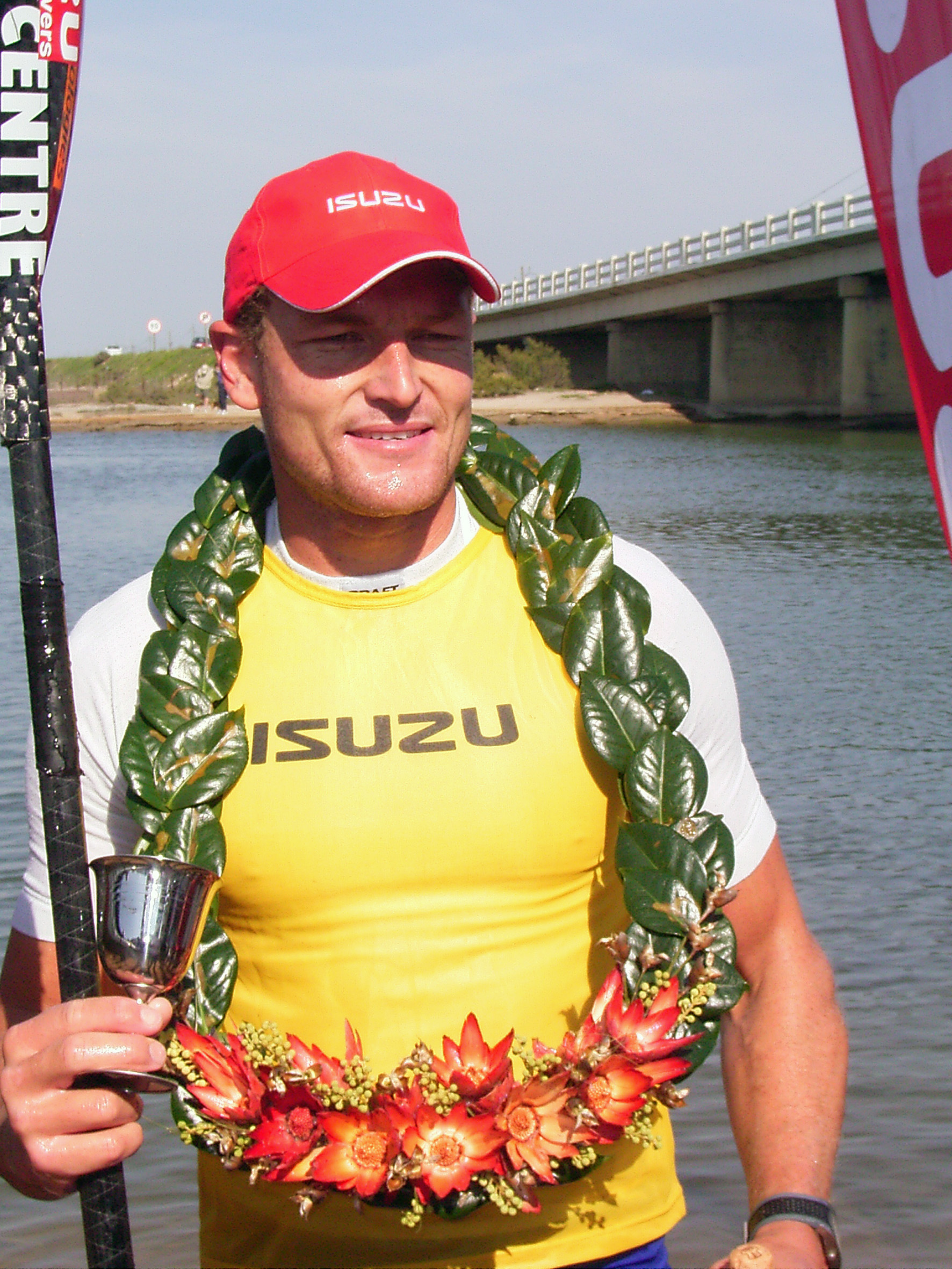
- McGregor winning the Berg River Canoe Marathon in 2005

Personal information
- Nationality: South African
- Born: 24 January 1978 (age 48)
Medal record
Men's canoe marathon
Representing South Africa
World Championships
Gold medal – first place	2003 Valladolid	K-1
Gold medal – first place	2011 Singapore	K-1
Gold medal – first place	2013 Copenhagen	K-1
Gold medal – first place	2014 Oklahoma City	K-1
Gold medal – first place	2014 Oklahoma City	K-2
Gold medal – first place	2015 Győr	K-1
Gold medal – first place	2016 Brandenburg an der Havel	K-1
Gold medal – first place	2016 Brandenburg an der Havel	K-2
Gold medal – first place	2017 Pietermaritzburg	K-1
Gold medal – first place	2017 Pietermaritzburg	K-2
Gold medal – first place	2018 Prado Vila Verde	K-2
Silver medal – second place	2015 Győr	K-2

Hank McGregor (born 24 January 1978) is a South African marathon canoeist and surf ski racer. He has won eleven gold medals at the ICF Canoe Marathon World Championships.
