= Attila Györe =

Hungarian canoeist (born 1975)

Personal information
- Born: 16 January 1975 (age 51)

Sport
- Country: Hungary
- Sport: Canoe marathon
- Event: C-2
Medal record
Representing Hungary
Men's canoe marathon
World Championships
Gold medal – first place	1999 Győr	C-2
Gold medal – first place	2000 Dartmouth	C-2
Gold medal – first place	2001 Stockton-on-Tees	C-2
Gold medal – first place	2002 Zamora	C-2
Gold medal – first place	2003 Valladolid	C-2
Gold medal – first place	2004 Bergen	C-2
Gold medal – first place	2005 Perth	C-2
Gold medal – first place	2006 Tremolat	C-2
Gold medal – first place	2007 Győr	C-2
Gold medal – first place	2008 Týn nad Vltavou	C-2
Gold medal – first place	2011 Singapore	C-2
Silver medal – second place	1998 Cape Town	C-2
Silver medal – second place	2012 Rome	C-2
Bronze medal – third place	2010 Banyoles	C-2
Bronze medal – third place	2013 Copenhagen	C-2

Attila Györe (born 16 January 1975) is a former Hungarian marathon canoeist. He is an 11-time World Champion.

== Career ==
Györe finished his career with 11 gold medals at the Canoe Marathon World Championships. He won ten consecutive C-2 championships with Edvin Csabai from 1999 to 2008.
