= Magnus Gregory =

English canoeist

Personal information
- Born: 26 December 1998 (age 27)

Sport
- Sport: Canoe sprint
- Club: Longridge Canoe Club

Magnus Gregory (born 26 December 1998) is an English international canoeist.

== Education ==
He was educated at Abingdon School from 2010-2017, where he was in the sailing first team and excelled at kayaking.

== Career ==
He won the Junior U-18 Sprint Canoe European Championship and also won silver medals at both the Junior Sprint and Marathon World Championships.

He received his first senior international call up and competed in the 2017 ICF Canoe Sprint World Championships – Men's K-1 5000 metres event at the 2017 ICF Canoe Sprint World Championships in Račice, Czech Republic.

== See also ==
List of Old Abingdonians
