= 2017 ICF Canoe Marathon World Championships =

International canoe competition

- Location: Pietermaritzburg, South Africa
- Dates: 7 to 10 September 2017

The 2017 ICF Canoe Marathon World Championships is the fifteenth edition of the event, which took place between 7 September and 10 September 2017 at Pietermaritzburg, South Africa. The competition consisted of seventeen events – nine in kayak and eight in canoe – divided in junior, under-23 and senior categories.

== Medalists ==
=== Seniors ===
Event	Gold	Time	Silver	Time	Bronze	Time
Men's C-1	Márton Kövér (HUN)	2:10:03.63	Manuel Garrido (ESP)	2:12:44.28	Manuel Campos (ESP)	2:15:27.46
Men's C-2	Hungary (HUN); Márton Kövér; Ádám Dóczé	1:59:58.63	Spain (ESP); Ramón Ferro; Óscar Grana	2:00:13.05	Spain (ESP); Manuel Campos; José Manuel Sánchez	2:01:47.13
Men's K-1	Hank McGregor (RSA)	2:09:37.91	Andrew Birkett (RSA)	2:09:38.83	Adrián Boros (HUN)	2:09:39.41
Men's K-2	South Africa (RSA); Hank McGregor; Jasper Mocke	2:00:11	Hungary (HUN); Adrián Boros; László Solti	2:00:13	South Africa (RSA); Andrew Birkett; Jean van der Westhuizen	2:00:15
Women's C-1	Liudmyla Babak (UKR)	1:48:00.94	Zsanett Lakatos (HUN)	1:51:20.93	Jana Ježová (CZE)	1:56:30.01
Women's K-1	Lani Belcher (GBR)	2:05:09.65	Vanda Kiszli (HUN)	2:05:15.07	Jennifer Egan (IRL)	2:05:43.81
Women's K-2	Hungary (HUN); Vanda Kiszli; Sára Anna Mihalik	1:56:29.62	Hungary (HUN); Renáta Csay; Alexandra Bara	1:56:42.90	Great Britain (GBR); Lani Belcher; Hayleigh-Jayne Mason	1:56:44.12

=== Under 23 ===
Event	Gold	Time	Silver	Time	Bronze	Time
Men's C-1	Dóri Bence Balázs (HUN)	1:54:00.96	Sérgio Maciel (POR)	1:54:36.40	Patryk Gluza (POL)	1:55:31.31
Men's K-1	Franco Iván Balboa (ARG)	1:52:55.89	Nicholas Notten (RSA)	1:53:05.10	Krisztián Máthé (HUN)	1:53:31.10
Women's K-1	Sára Anna Mihalik (HUN)	1:49:43.12	Zsófia Czéllai-Vörös (HUN)	1:50:11.90	Alexandra Lane (GBR)	1:52:15.92

=== Juniors ===
Event	Gold	Time	Silver	Time	Bronze	Time
Men's C-1	Balázs Adolf (HUN)	1:40:53.67	Sebestyén Simon (HUN)	1:41:07.70	Duarte Silva (POR)	1:43:18.76
Men's C-2	Hungary (HUN); Sebestyén Simon; Dániel Fejes	1:36:46.39	France (FRA); Léo Dubois-Dunilac; Thomas Dubois-Dunilac	1:38:57.54	Germany (GER); Arved Heine; Jonas Mode	1:43:45.71
Men's K-1	Ádám Varga (HUN)	1:41:35.66	Charles Smith (GBR)	1:44:17.03	Sifiso Albert Masina (RSA)	1:44:20.89
Men's K-2	Hungary (HUN); Levente Vékássy; Ádám Varga	1:35:45.18	South Africa (RSA); David Evans; Hamish MacKenzie	1:35:53.89	Spain (ESP); Carlos Gómez; Miguel Sánchez	1:38:03.49
Women's C-1	Giada Bragato (HUN)	1:36:46.64	Mathilde Troncin (FRA)	1:37:01.67	Maja Szajdek (POL)	1:44:00.74
Women's K-1	Zsóka Csikós (HUN)	1:35:45.39	Dorina Fekete (HUN)	1:35:45.95	Christie Mackenzie (RSA)	1:37:30.19
Women's K-2	Hungary (HUN); Emese Kőhalmi; Olga Bakó	1:26:18.74	Hungary (HUN); Zsófia Korsós; Viktória Nagy	1:29:03.03	Great Britain (GBR); Freya Peters; Emma Russell	1:31:24.05

== Medal table ==
Rank	Nation	Gold	Silver	Bronze	Total
1	Hungary (HUN)	12	8	2	22
2	South Africa (RSA)	2	3	3	8
3	Great Britain (GBR)	1	1	3	5
4	Argentina (ARG)	1	0	0	1
4	Ukraine (UKR)	1	0	0	1
6	Spain (ESP)	0	2	3	5
7	France (FRA)	0	2	0	2
8	Portugal (POR)	0	1	1	2
9	Poland (POL)	0	0	2	2
10	Czech Republic (CZE)	0	0	1	1
10	Germany (GER)	0	0	1	1
10	Ireland (IRL)	0	0	1	1
Totals (12 entries)		17	17	17	51
