= Ricardo Coelho =

Portuguese canoeist (born 1998)

Personal information
- Born: 4 November 1998 (age 27)

Sport
- Country: Portugal
- Sport: Canoe marathon
- Event: C-2
Medal record
Representing Portugal
Men's canoe marathon
World Championships
Gold medal – first place	2025 Győr	C-2
Bronze medal – third place	2024 Metković	C-2
European Championships
Gold medal – first place	2025 Ponte de Lima	C-2
Silver medal – second place	2021 Moscow	C-2
Silver medal – second place	2024 Poznań	C-2

Ricardo Coelho (born 4 November 1998) is a Portuguese marathon canoeist.

== Career ==
In June 2025, he competed at the 2025 Canoe Marathon European Championships and won a gold medal in the C-2 event, along with Rui Lacerda, with a time of 1:40:37.32. In September 2025, he competed at the 2025 ICF Canoe Marathon World Championships and won a gold medal in the C-2 event with a time of 1:35:45.63.
