= 2024 ICF Canoe Marathon World Championships =

Canoe competition

- Venue: Neretva River
- Location: Metković, Croatia
- Dates: 19–22 September

The 2024 ICF Canoe Marathon World Championships was held from 19 to 22 September 2024 in Metković, Croatia.

== Schedule ==
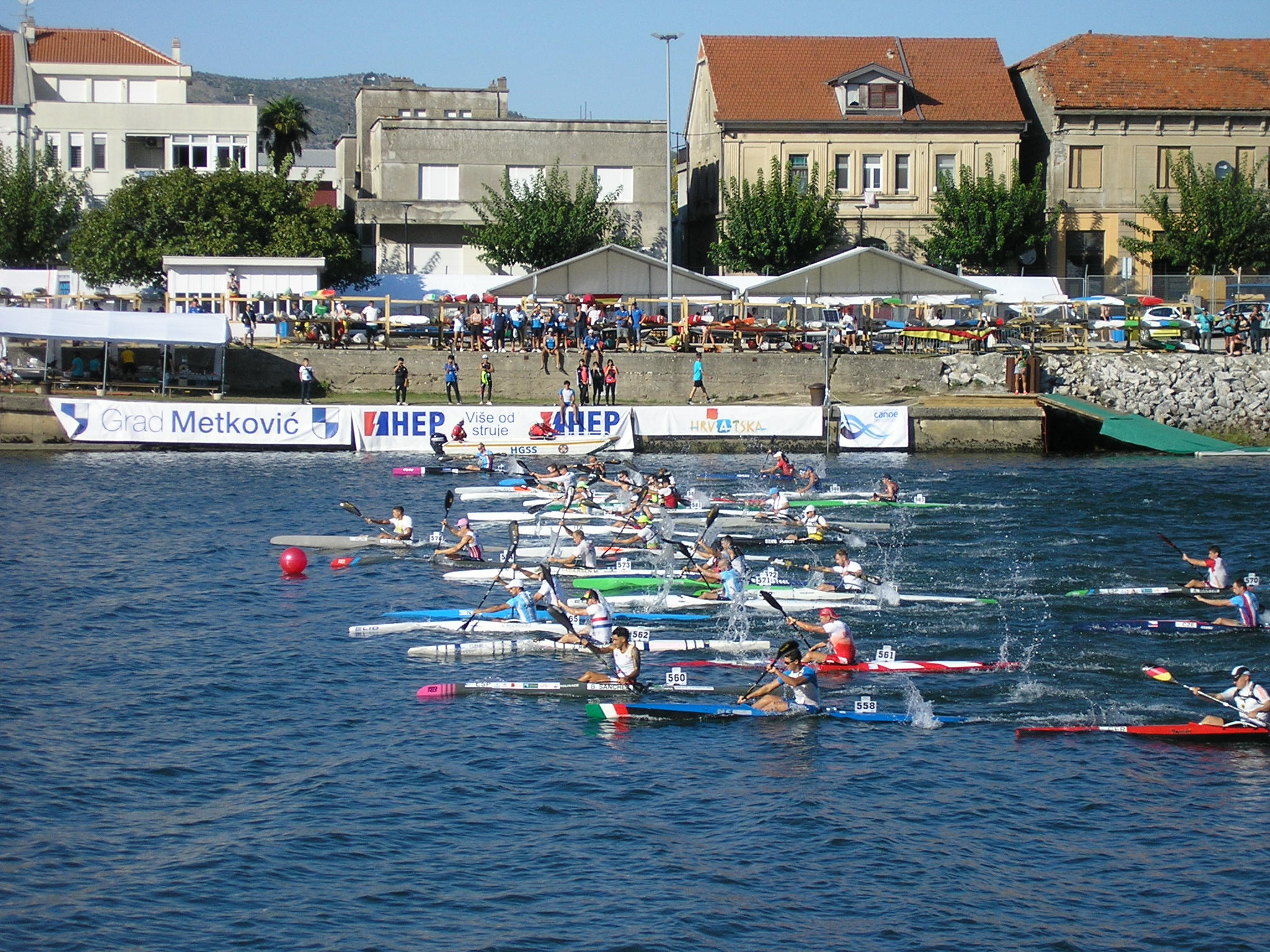
Race start

All times are local time (Central European Summer Time).

Date	Time	Event
19 September	09:00	K1 Women Junior
19 September	09:05	C1 Women Junior
19 September	10:50	K1 Women - Short Race Heats
19 September	11:40	K1 Men - Short Race Heats
19 September	14:30	C1 Men Junior
19 September	16:00	C1 Women - Short Race
19 September	16:30	C1 Men - Short Race
19 September	17:00	K1 Women - Short Race
19 September	17:30	K1 Men - Short Race
20 September	09:00	K2 Women Junior
20 September	09:05	C1 Men Under 23
20 September	14:30	K1 Women Under 23
20 September	14:35	C2 Men Junior
20 September	14:40	C1 Women Under 23
20 September	16:45	K1 Men Under 23
21 September	08:15	K1 Women
21 September	10:40	C1 Men
21 September	14:00	K1 Men Junior
21 September	14:05	C1 Women
21 September	16:10	K1 Men
22 September	09:00	K2 Men Junior
22 September	11:00	K2 Women
22 September	11:05	C2 Men
22 September	14:00	K2 Men

== Medalists ==
=== Senior ===
Event	Gold		Silver		Bronze	
Men's C-1 (22.60 km)	Mateusz Borgieł; Poland	1:44:00.95	Manuel Campos; Spain	1:45:06.65	Rui Lacerda; Portugal	1:46:01.82
Men's C-2 (26.20 km)	Mateusz Zuchora; Mateusz Borgieł; Poland	1:53:01.90	Jaime Duro; Oscar Grana; Spain	1:53:33.16	Rui Lacerda; Ricardo Coelho; Portugal	1:54:13.84
Men's K-1 (29.80 km)	Mads Pedersen; Denmark	2:03:28.75	José Ramalho; Portugal	2:05:53.21	Adrián Martín; Spain	2:06:14.22
Men's K-2 (29.80 km)	Fernando Pimenta; José Ramalho; Portugal	1:53:56.58	Quentin Urban; Jérémy Candy; France	1:53:58.23	Adrián Boros; Tamás Erdélyi; Hungary	1:54:19.68
Women's C-1 (15.40 km)	Liudmyla Babak; Ukraine	1:21:33.44	Zsófia Kisbán; Hungary	1:22:27.61	Olena Tsyhankova; Ukraine	1:23:11.79
Women's K-1 (26.20 km)	Melina Andersson; Sweden	1:58:37.51	Vanda Kiszli; Hungary	1:58:43.42	Emese Kőhalmi; Hungary	1:59:21.09
Women's K-2 (26.20 km)	Zsóka Csikós; Emese Kőhalmi; Hungary	1:53:01.90	Saskia Hockly; Christie MacKenzie; South Africa	1:53:33.16	Melina Andersson; Ella Richter; Sweden	1:54:13.84

=== Senior short race ===
Event	Gold		Silver		Bronze	
Men's C-1 (3.40 km)	Ignacio Calvo; Spain	14:51.24	Mateusz Borgiel; Poland	14:55.07	Thomas Dubois Dunilac; France	14:59.87
Men's K-1 (3.40 km)	Mads Pedersen; Denmark	12:27.69	Hamish Lovemore; South Africa	12:41.25	Ivan Alonso Lage; Spain	12:49.68
Women's C-1 (3.40 km)	Zsófia Kisbán; Hungary	16:48.93	Liudmyla Babak; Ukraine	17:07.88	Olena Tsyhankova; Ukraine	17:34.09
Women's K-1 (3.40 km)	Melina Andersson; Sweden	14:02.03	Emese Kőhalmi; Hungary	14:08.58	Vanda Kiszli; Hungary	14:09.90

=== Under-23 ===
Event	Gold		Silver		Bronze	
Men's C-1 (19.00 km)	Mihály Pluzsik; Hungary	1:29:33.24	Eryk Wilga; Poland	1:29:43.01	Diego Piñeiro; Spain	1:31:33.35
Men's K-1 (26.20 km)	Philip Knudsen; Denmark	1:50:14.40	Ulvard Hart; South Africa	1:51:07.23	Zalan Peli; Hungary	1:51:08.00
Women's C-1 (11.80 km)	Lili Matkovics; Hungary	1:03:14.80	Anastasia Dezhytska; Ukraine	1:03:52.00	Alžběta Veverková; Czech Republic	1:04:18.25
Women's K-1 (22.60 km)	Panna Sinkó; Hungary	1:46:10.14	Panna Csépe; Hungary	1:46:11.89	Pernille Hostrup; Denmark	1:46:23.30

=== Junior ===
Event	Gold		Silver		Bronze	
Men's C-1 (15.40 km)	Marcell Kereszturi-Méri; Hungary	1:15:17.80	Alex Wilga; Poland	1:15:33.99	Alberto Ruiz; Spain	1:16:26.90
Men's C-2 (15.40 km)	Zsombor Szegi; Bonifac Koleszár; Hungary	1:10:38.06	Artem Bocheliuk; Maksym Lavrenchuk; Ukraine	1:10:46.15	Krystian Kubica; Alex Wilga; Poland	1:11:01.03
Men's K-1 (22.60 km)	Victor Devesa; Spain	1:37:06.24	Leonardo Candela; Italy	1:37:51.74	Tamás Ivancsó; Hungary	1:38:07.55
Men's K-2 (22.60 km)	João Sousa; Francisco Batista; Portugal	1:29:06.47	Joseph Enoch; William Short; Great Britain	1:29:35.81	Ruben Castilla; Arturo Aguilar; Spain	1:29:53.43
Women's C-1 (11.80 km)	Tereza Kodetová; Czech Republic	1:03:28.62	Agata Kowalak; Poland	1:04:08.76	Nerea Novo; Spain	1:04:24.73
Women's K-1 (19.00 km)	Maria Gomes; Portugal	1:28:37.47	Georgia Singe; South Africa	1:28:39.23	Caroline Heuser; Germany	1:28:45.67
Women's K-2 (19.00 km)	Panni Hudi-Kadler; Panka Zatykó; Hungary	1:24:03.47	Georgia Singe; Holly Smith; South Africa	1:24:32.23	Annabel Hutchinson; Mollie Ball; Great Britain	1:24:39.13

== Medal table ==
* Host nation (Croatia)

Rank	Nation	Gold	Silver	Bronze	Total
1	Hungary	8	4	5	17
2	Poland	3	4	1	8
3	Denmark	3	0	1	4
4	Spain	2	2	6	10
5	Portugal	2	1	2	5
6	Sweden	2	0	1	3
7	Ukraine	1	3	2	6
8	Czech Republic	1	0	1	2
9	South Africa	0	5	0	5
10	France	0	1	1	2
10	Great Britain	0	1	1	2
12	Italy	0	1	0	1
13	Germany	0	0	1	1
Totals (13 entries)		22	22	22	66
