= David Mosquera =

Spanish canoeist

Personal information
- Full name: David Manuel Mosquera Lendoiro
- Nickname: Petón
- Nationality: Spanish
- Born: August 21, 1978 (age 47) Betanzos, Galicia, Spain

Sport
- Country: Spain
- Sport: Canoe marathon
- Club: C.N. Ría de Betanzos
Medal record
Men's Canoe marathon
World Championships
Bronze medal – third place	2011 Singapore	C-1
European Championships
Bronze medal – third place	2014 Piešťany	C-1

David Manuel Mosquera Lendoiro (August 21, 1978 in Betanzos), also known as Petón, is a Spanish marathon canoe racer. He has won a bronze medal at the 2011 World Championships and another bronze medal at the 2014 Canoe Marathon European Championships, in both cases in the C-1 event.
