= Rui Lacerda =

Portuguese canoeist (born 1991)

Personal information
- Born: 8 October 1991 (age 34) Ponte de Lima, Portugal

Sport
- Country: Portugal
- Sport: Canoe marathon
- Event: C-1, C-2
Medal record
Representing Portugal
Men's canoe marathon
World Championships
Gold medal – first place	2025 Győr	C-2
Bronze medal – third place	2024 Metković	C-1
Bronze medal – third place	2024 Metković	C-2
World Games
Bronze medal – third place	2013 Cali	C-2
European Championships
Gold medal – first place	2025 Ponte de Lima	C-2
Silver medal – second place	2018 Metković	C-1
Silver medal – second place	2021 Moscow	C-2
Silver medal – second place	2024 Poznań	C-1
Silver medal – second place	2024 Poznań	C-2
Silver medal – second place	2025 Ponte de Lima	C-1
Bronze medal – third place	2024 Poznań	C-1 short race

Rui Lacerda (born 8 October 1991) is a Portuguese marathon canoeist.

== Career ==
In June 2025, he competed at the 2025 Canoe Marathon European Championships and won a gold medal in the C-2 event, along with Ricardo Coelho, with a time of 1:40:37.32. In September 2025, he competed at the 2025 ICF Canoe Marathon World Championships and won a gold medal in the C-2 event with a time of 1:35:45.63.

== Personal life ==
Lacerda graduated from the University of Coimbra with a degree in sports science and physical education. He is a firefighter in Viana do Castelo.
