= Emilio Merchán =

Spanish canoeist

Medal record

Representing Spain

Men's canoe sprint

World Championhips
Gold medal – first place	2009 Dartmouth	K-2 1000 m

Men's canoe marathon

World Championships
Gold medal – first place	2007 Győr	K-1
Gold medal – first place	2008 Týn nad Vltavou	K-1
Gold medal – first place	2009 Gaia	K-2
Gold medal – first place	2012 Rome	K-2
Gold medal – first place	2013 Copenhagen	K-2
Silver medal – second place	2005 Perth	K-1
Bronze medal – third place	2006 Tremolat	K-1
Bronze medal – third place	2014 Oklahoma City	K-2

Emilio Merchán Alonso (born 29 February 1976 in Zamora) is a Spanish sprint and marathon canoeist who has competed since the mid-1990s. He won a gold medal in the K-2 1000 m event at the 2009 ICF Canoe Sprint World Championships in Dartmouth.

Merchán also competed in two Summer Olympics, earning his best finish of fifth in the K-4 1000 m event at Atlanta in 1996.
