= Jürgen Hönscheid =

German windsurfer (born 1954)

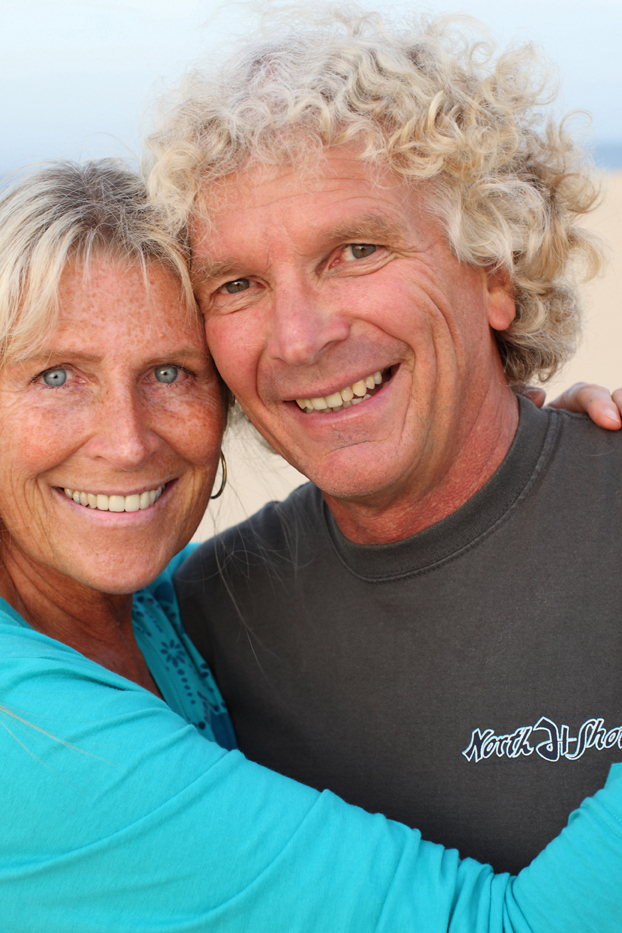
Jürgen Hönscheid and his wife Ute in 2009

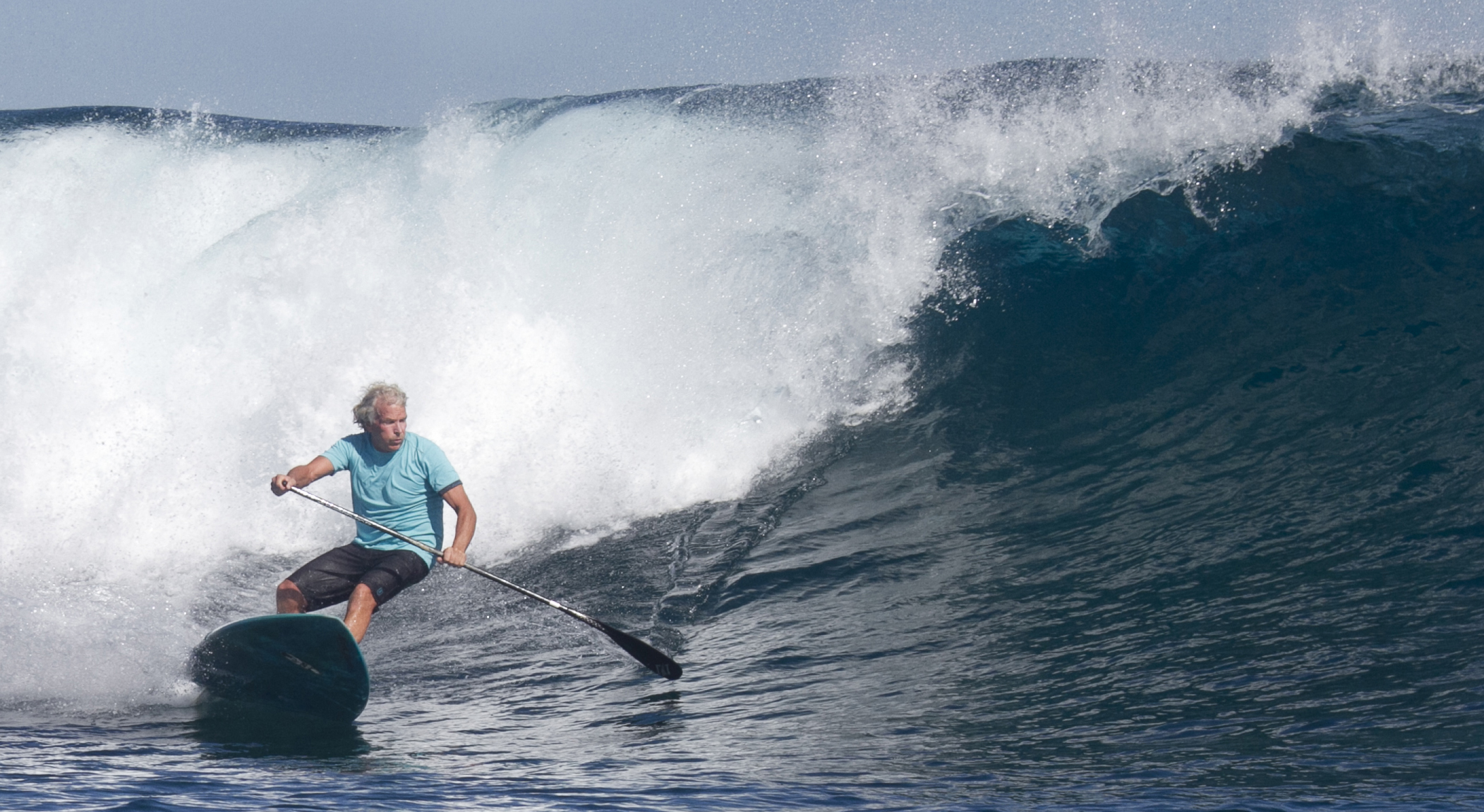
Hönscheid riding a wave in Hawaii on a standup paddleboard in 2012

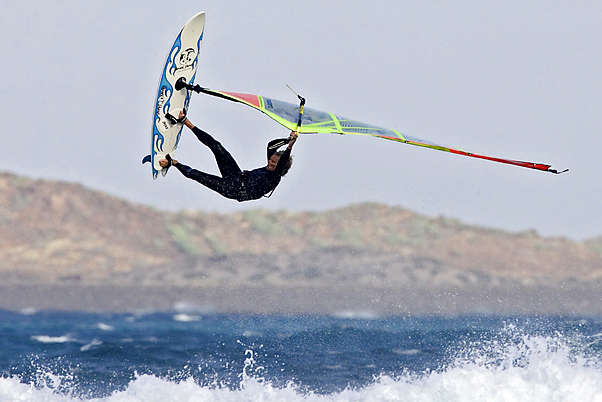
Waveriding in Fuerteventura in 2004

Jürgen Hönscheid (born 1954, in Sylt) is a German windsurfer. He became the vice world champion in tandem windsurfing in 1974, setting a land speed record in 1981; was a founding member of the Professional Windsurfers Association in 1982, and has authored several books on the subject including Heavy weather windsurfing : on funboards and sinkers (1984), Brandungssurfen (1985), and Mein Arbeitgeber ist der Wind 50 Jahre Surf- und Windsurfgeschichte(n) (2008).

== Literary works ==
- Hönscheid, Jürgen; Winner, Ken (1984). Starkwind Windsurfen mit Funboards u. Sinker (in German). München. ISBN 3-570-02018-5.
- Heavy weather windsurfing : on funboards and sinkers. London: Stanford Maritime. 1984. ISBN 0-540-07285-0.
- Hönscheid, Jürgen; Zotschew, Stefan (1981). Brandungssurfen (in German). Bielefeld. ISBN 3-7688-0345-7.
- Hönscheid, Jürgen (2008). Mein Arbeitgeber ist der Wind 50 Jahre Surf- und Windsurfgeschichte(n) (in German) (1. Aufl ed.). Kiel. ISBN 978-3-00-025708-7.
