= Jordan Wylie =

British adventurer (born 1983)

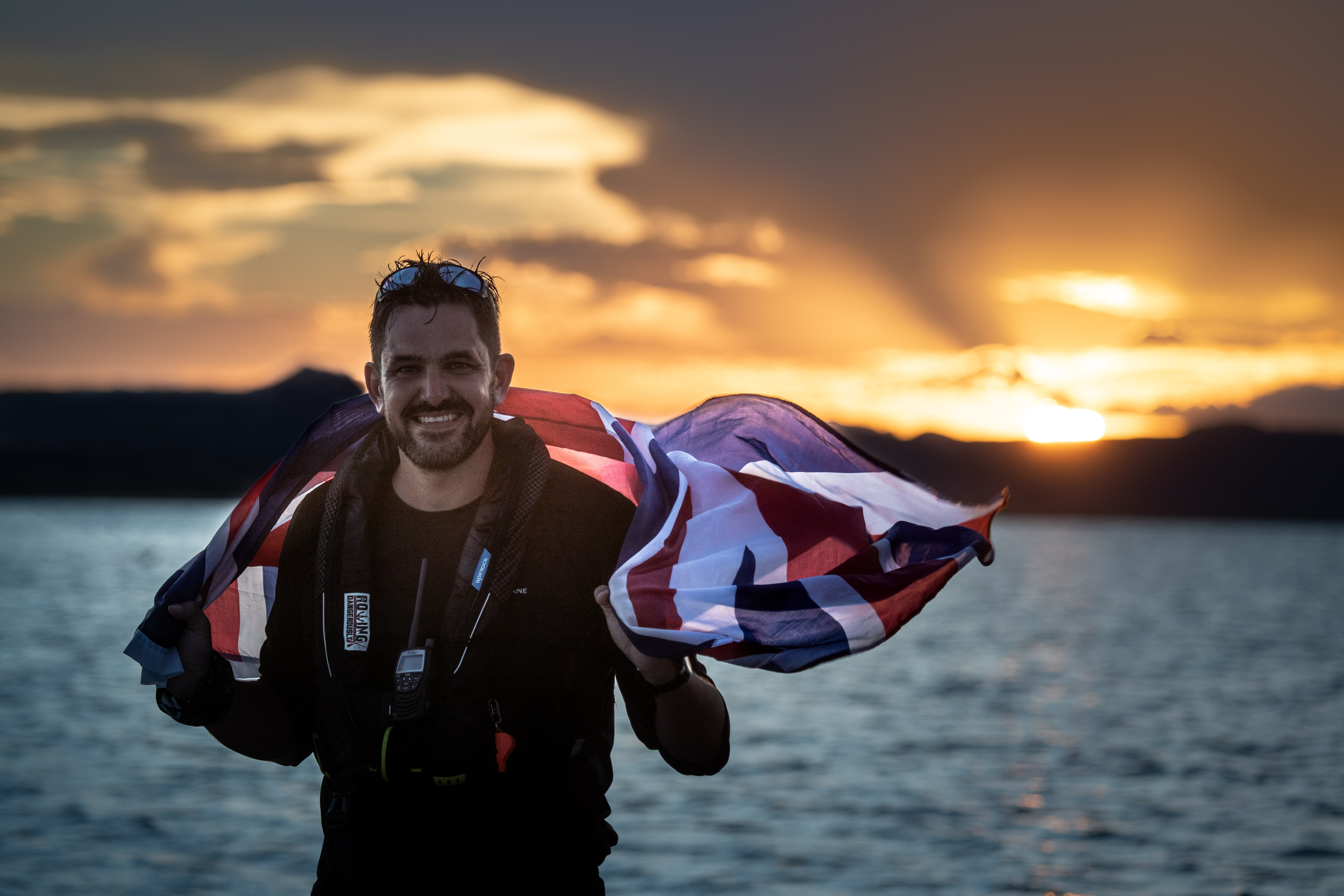

Jordan Wylie MBE (born 16 October 1983) is a British adventurer, author, television personality and former soldier. He is best known for being one of the cast of Channel 4's Hunted and Celebrity Hunted television series. Wylie was appointed as the national ambassador for the Army Cadet Force in the United Kingdom in 2018.

== Early life and education ==
Jordan Wylie was born in Blackpool, Lancashire. Wylie is from a family with a military background, his father was a Royal Marines Commando who served in the Falklands conflict of 1982 and both his grandfathers served in the Royal Artillery. Wylie completed all his academic studies whilst serving in the British Army. He studied Security and Risk Management and holds a Foundation Degree from the University of Leicester, a Bachelor of Arts (BA) with Honours Degree from the University of Leicester and a Master of Arts (MA) Degree in Maritime security from Coventry University.

== Career ==
=== Military service ===
After leaving secondary school, Wylie joined the British Army where he served with The King's Royal Hussars from 2001 to 2010. During his military service, he served with A squadron as an intelligence operator on operations in Iraq, B Squadron as a search team member in Northern Ireland, and HQ Squadron as a close reconnaissance trooper. Wylie represented the British Army (under 21's) and the Royal Armoured Corps at football and was awarded his regimental colours for excellence in sport. After leaving the military, Wylie worked as a private military contractor providing specialist security services to the international maritime and private super yacht sectors. Wylie was also licensed by the Security Industry Authority to provide Close Protection services to VIP’s and High Net Worth Individuals.

=== Books ===
Wylie's first book, Citadel, describes his journey from a Blackpool council estate to becoming a soldier and working as a private military contractor dealing with 21st-century piracy of off the coast of Somalia. Citadel became a The Sunday Times bestseller (general paperbacks) on publication in November 2017. Wylie also wrote Running for my Life, which covers his running adventure through some of the world's most dangerous countries.

In 2020, during the COVID-19 pandemic, Wylie and his daughter published a colouring book titled Around The World With Evie & Jordan for children to help raise funds for key workers in the UK. On 9 November 2021, Wylie published The Power of the Paddle, which covers his world record attempt to standup paddleboard (SUP) around mainland Great Britain to raise enough funds to build a school on the Horn of Africa. The book debuted at number eight in the UK chart of The Sunday Times and listed 1805 sales in its first week.

=== Television ===
Wylie has been one of the main on screen cast members on Channel 4's Hunted and Celebrity Hunted since 2017, appearing in seasons 3, 4, 5, 6, 7, 8 and celebrity seasons 2, 3, 4, 5 and 7. Wylie is a regular commentator on news programmes such as Sky News and ITV News and is known to be a close associate and friend of news breakfast show presenter Kay Burley who also starred on Celebrity Hunted in 2018. Wylie has appeared in several documentaries and television shows in the United Kingdom and the United States including Floating Armouries on Vice Media 2016, Running Dangerously on Forces TV 2018 and Blind date on Channel 5 2018.

=== Radio ===
Wylie is a regular guest on British Forces Radio and previously held an ad-hoc regular slot on Love Andover in Hampshire where he once lived. Wylie is also the on-stage presenter of the annual Pride of Andover Awards.

=== Expeditions ===
Wylie has been recognised for his adventure achievements around the world which include several official Guinness World Records and world firsts. In August 2014, Wylie and two of his former military colleagues climbed Mount Kilimanjaro completely barefoot as part of a charity expedition to summit the tallest mountain on the African continent and the highest free-standing mountain in the world (19,342 feet).

In October 2019, he became the first person to row solo across the notorious Bab El Mandeb Straits. Wylie also set a new world record with his fellow Army Cadets ambassador Sally Orange when they ran the deepest underground marathon in October 2020.

Wylie was recognised by British Canoeing in 2020 for his unsuccessful world first circumnavigation attempt to Standup Paddleboard around Great Britain. Although Wylie's attempt was unsuccessful due to COVID-19 lockdown regulations in Scotland, Wylie set a new world record for the longest Standup Paddleboard journey on the ocean (149 days / 2733 km). The record was subsequently broken by Brendon Prince (GBR) the following year.

In December 2021, Wylie completed the Antarctica Extreme Ice Marathon which formed part of his attempt to successfully run marathons in the 10 coldest places on the planet.

On 3 January 2023 Wylie became an official member of the 7 continents marathon club, the Club is unique and reserved for athletes who have run a marathon within the Antarctic Circle on the Antarctica continent, as well as on the other six continents.

In 2024 Wylie completed the world’s first ever “Eco Triathlon” across Europe, from Pisa Tower (Italy) Blackpool Tower (UK) via the Eiffel Tower in France.

In 2025 Wylie successfully achieved three mountaineering first ascents in the Heritage Range in Antarctica, before successfully skiing to the geographic South Pole. Wylie was fundraising for the Army Cadet Charitable Trust (ACCT UK).

=== Charity ===
Wylie is an ambassador, trustee and patron of various charities in the United Kingdom, including Epilepsy Action, Frontline Children, Horsepower Museum and The Abel Foundation. In May 2021 Wylie opened a new school in the Republic of Djibouti in partnership with the local government and supported by the United Kingdom Foreign Commonwealth & Development Office. Wylie had spent 3 years personally fundraising to build the school in the As Eyla region.

== Honours and awards ==
Wylie was appointed Member of the Order of the British Empire (MBE) in the 2023 New Year Honours for services to charity and education in the UK and overseas.

In October 2025, Wylie was awarded a fellowship and doctorate (honoris causa) from the University of Winchester for outstanding contributions to primary and secondary education through adventure and the great outdoors.

- – General Service Medal
- – Iraq Medal
