= Standup paddleboarding =

Water sport

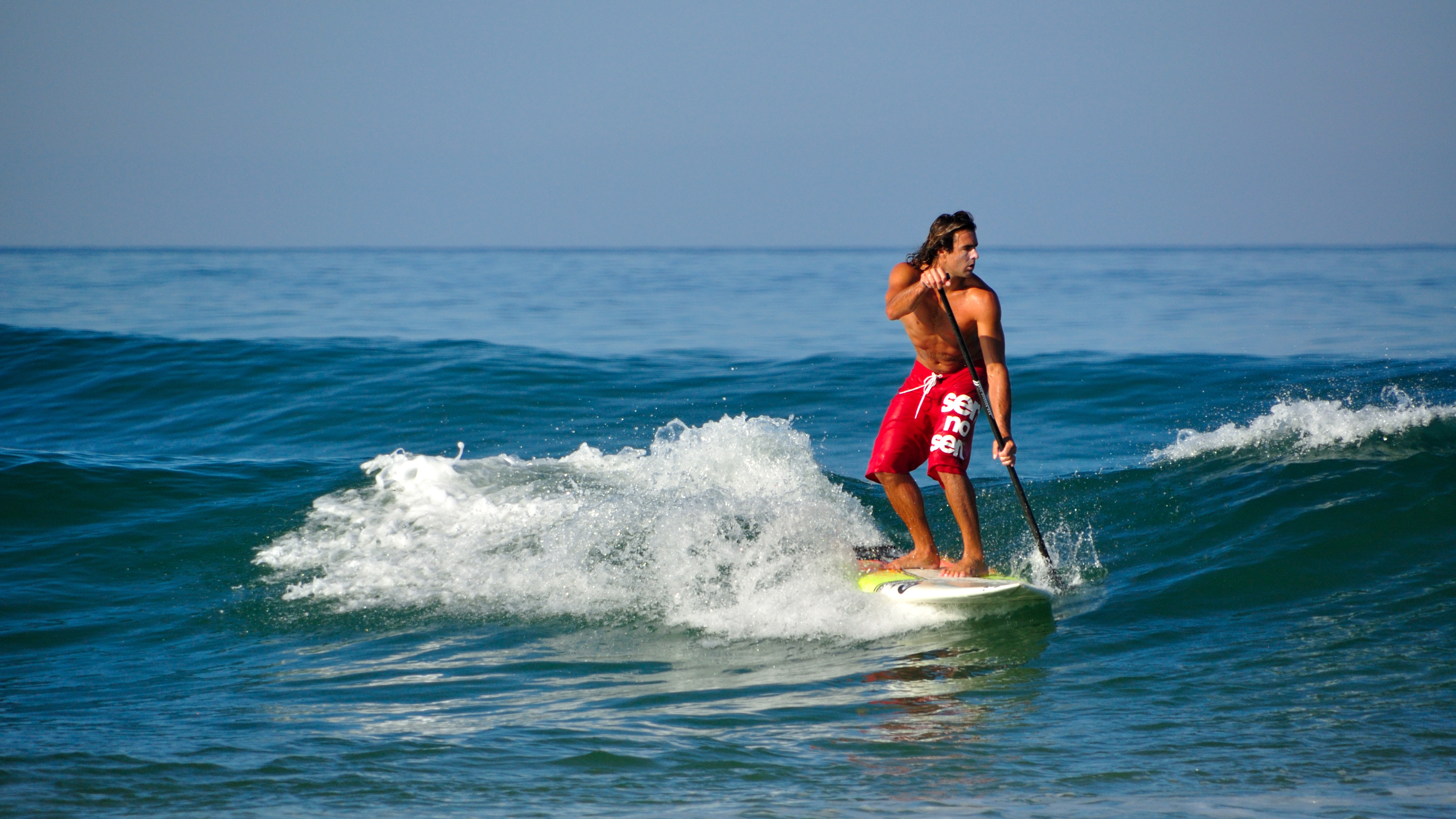
Standup paddleboarding in light surf

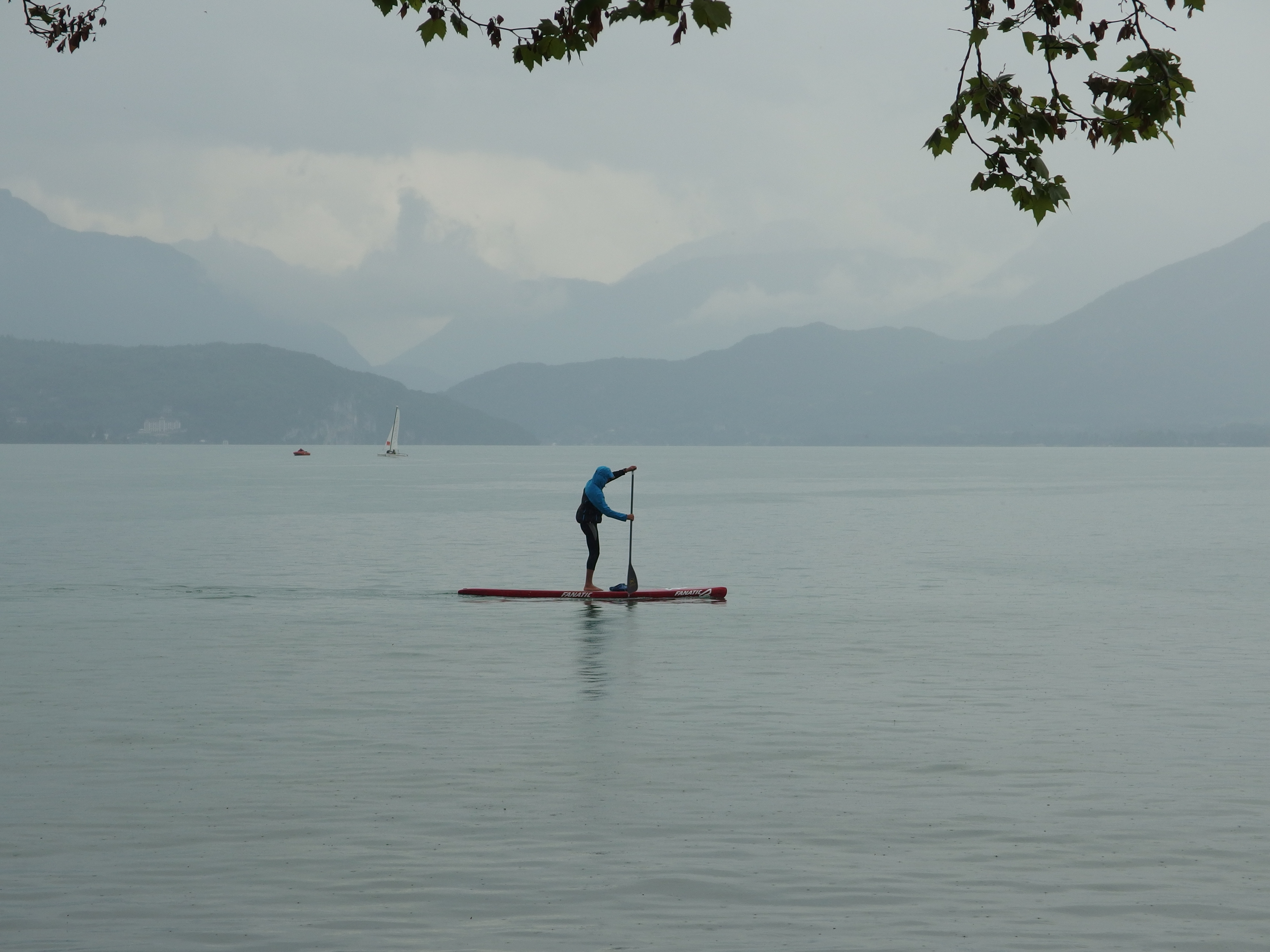
Standup paddle boarding in Lake Annecy, France

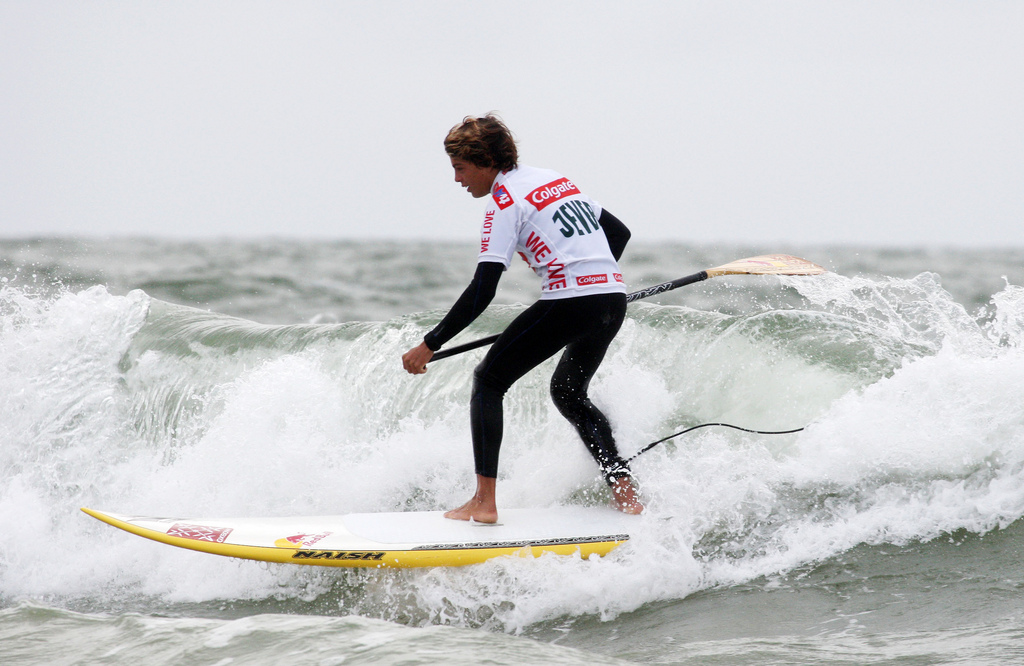
Kai Lenny, World Cup Sylt 2009

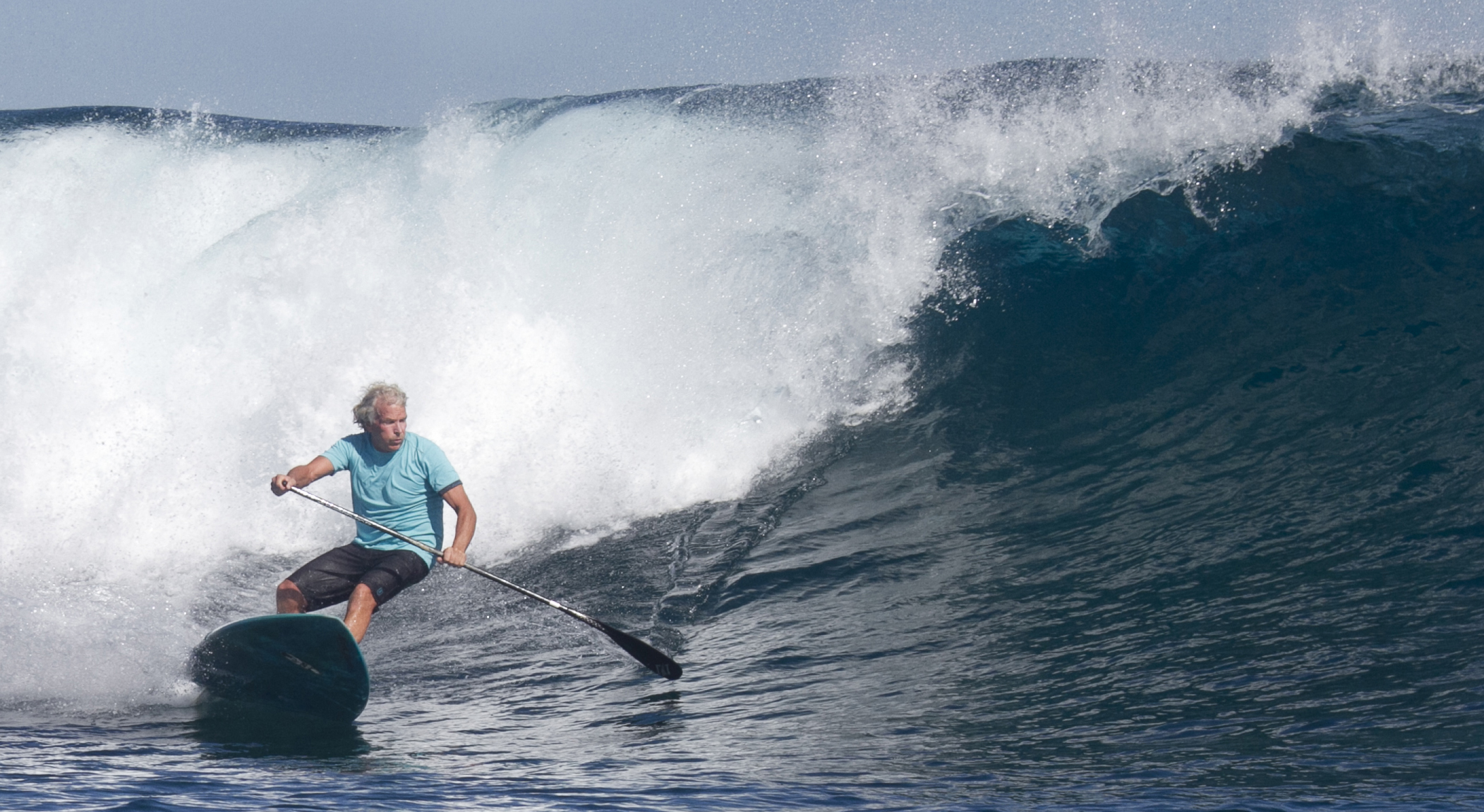
Professional windsurfing veteran Jürgen Hönscheid riding a wave in Hawaii

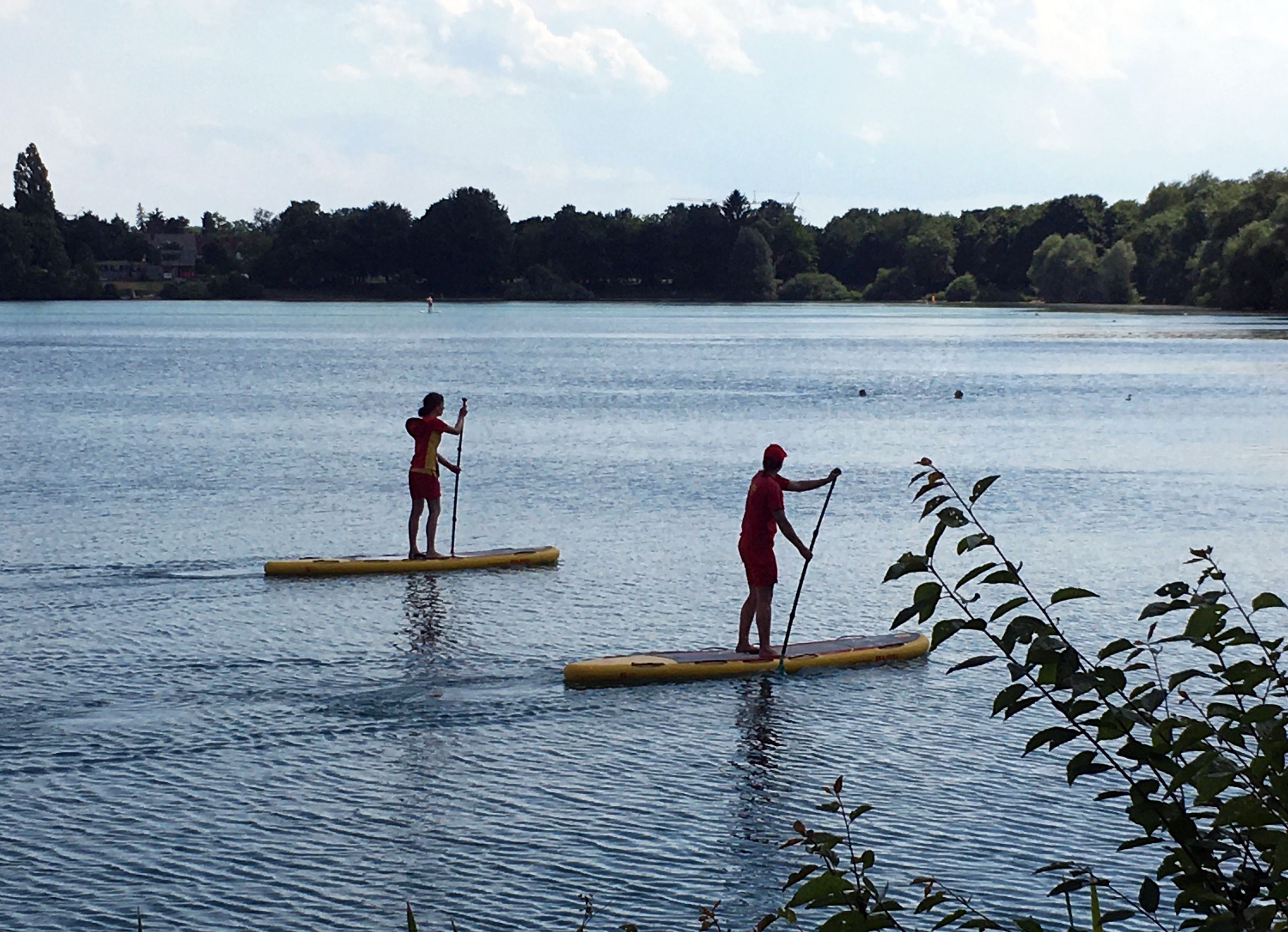
Professional use: Two lifeguards of the German Life Saving Association patrolling a public bathing area of a lake on stand-up paddleboards in Munich, Germany

Standup paddleboarding, stand-up paddleboarding or stand up paddle (SUP) is a water sport born from surfing with modern roots in Hawaii. Standup paddleboarders stand on boards that are floating on the water and use a paddle to propel themselves through the water. The sport was documented in a 2013 report that identified it as the outdoor sporting activity with the most first-time participants in the United States that year. Variations include flat water paddling, racing, surfing, whitewater SUP, yoga, and fishing.

In the traditional form, the board is used in a standing position and a single-sided paddle is used, however, due to the global popularity and use of SUP boards by less experienced users, a sitting position is also used (some boards have a seat) and a kneeling position, sometimes using a double-sided paddle.

== History ==
The act of propelling oneself on a floating platform with the help of a paddle or setting pole traces back thousands of years and across many continents in the form of rafts and punts, but the current form and popularity of standing paddleboarding originated in Hawaii in the 1900s. Records of earlier forms of SUP have been found as early as 3,000 B.C. and its iterations span over various regions such as Peru, Levant, Italy, and China.

Modern standup paddleboarding began in the 1940s on Waikiki beach serving as a hub for local instructors to teach tourists how to surf. Some Hawaii surfers used oars for their convenience to make pictures of traditional surfers' training. John Ah Choy was a local Hawaiian who surfed, but as he got older and was unable to get up and down from his board, he would stand on his board from the break and paddle out with a canoe paddle to catch waves. His sons, Leroy and Bobby Ah Choy, and their friend, Duke Kahanamoku, started to mimic this while they taught surfing to visiting tourists. They did this as a way to keep an eye on surf students while also monitoring the incoming swell. They also utilized the vantage point of being out on the water to take pictures. As the style became popular with other surfers, it took on the name Beach Boy Surfing after the instructors, who were called Waikiki Beach Boys. Steve West credits outrigger canoeing combined with surfing as the basis of SUP, since the individual skills (board riding and paddling) already existed. In the 1990s, Laird Hamilton redefined and modernized standup paddleboarding as a sport. In 2004, SUP surfing was added as a category in the Buffalo Big Board Contest.

Standup paddleboarding has diversified from a variation of surfing into racing, touring, yoga, whitewater, and fishing. Its surfing heritage coupled with its various disciplines make the sport attractive and accessible to everyone, regardless of ability.

The first magazine devoted to the sport, Standup Journal, was founded in June 2007.

=== SUP surfing ===
SUP surfing is a variation of traditional surfing. Instead of lying prone on the surfboard and paddling with arms to get out to the surf zone, SUP surfing allows the participant to stand on the board from the shore and paddle out to the surf zone using a SUP paddle. The best way to move forward is to stand hip-width apart on the board with one's knees slightly bent. The paddle should be held in the water perpendicular to the board so that one does not unintentionally steer while driving. Once in the surf zone, the surfing rules still apply. At the SUP surfer's turn, one paddles and steers with the SUP paddle to catch a wave. This style of surfing is widely used by surfers who have physical limitations due to hip and shoulder injuries.

=== SUP touring ===
In 2007, the concept of paddleboarding on flat water began to take serious shape, and a year later, in 2008, the first touring boards started to hit the market. In that same year, Nick Matzorkis founded Austin, Texas-based SUP ATX, in part to popularize flat water paddle boarding. Says Matzorkis, "We wanted to popularize the sport, not just for surfers, but for everybody."

This style of the board differs from traditional surfing-style SUPs in that it includes a displacement hull. The displacement hull allows the board to glide and track similar to a canoe or kayak. Many other features were soon offered, including deck rigging to carry gear. The fast design with more glide is an attractive option for those who plan to keep their adventures inland.

Tour paddleboarding has become a way for individuals to seek adventure, serenity, personal achievement, and a deeper connection with nature.

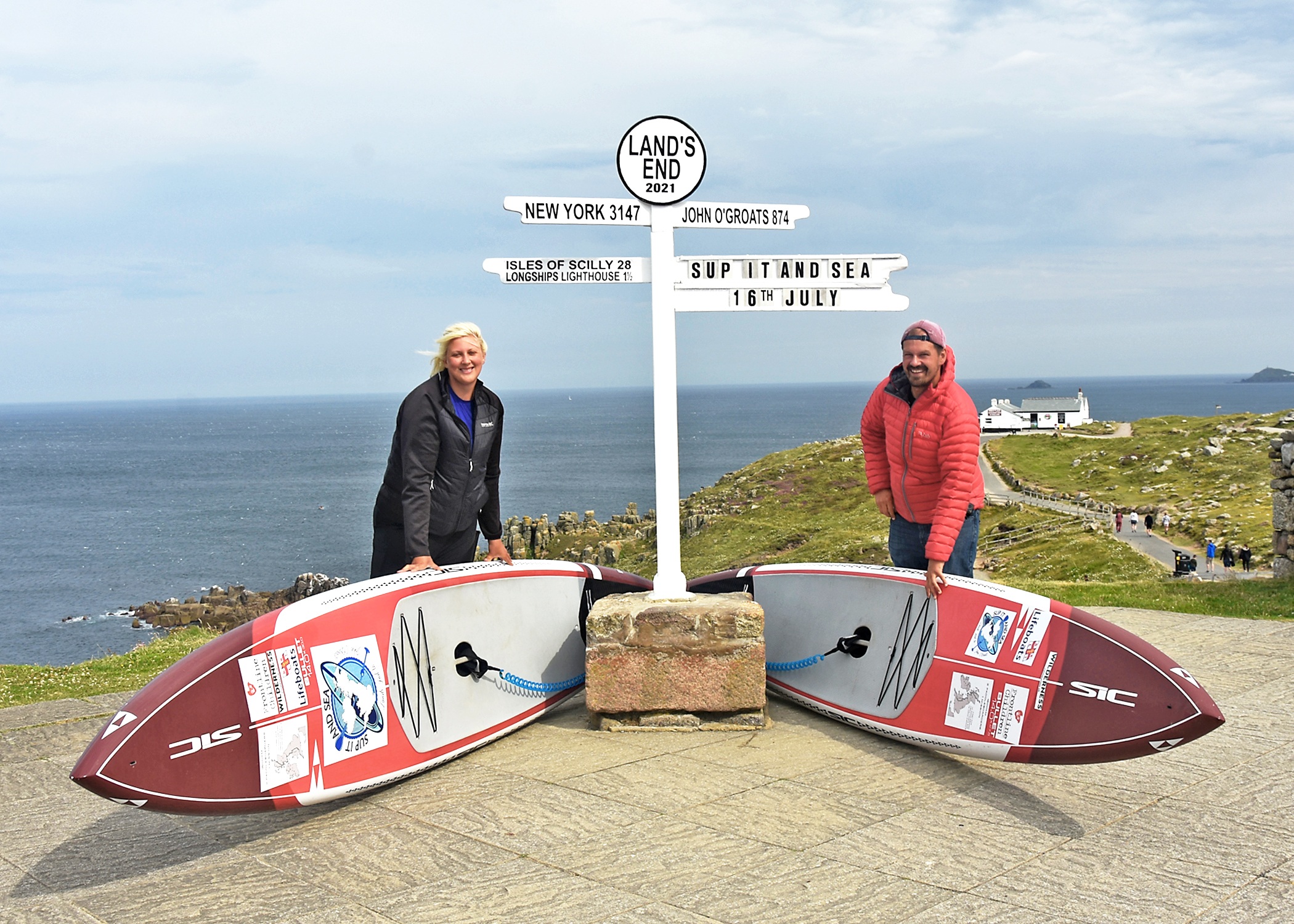
First pair to Paddleboard from Land's End to John o'Groats

In 2018, Cal Major became the first person to paddle Land's End to John o' Groats, the classic British long-distance journey, taking 59 days. Her route took her along the Cornish and Devon coast into the Bristol Channel, up the River Severn and by canals to Blackpool, by sea around Cumbria and the Mull of Galloway, across the Firth of Clyde to the Isle of Arran, along the whole of the Caledonian Canal, and up the coast of northeast Scotland.

In 2020, Jordan Wylie attempted to SUP around Great Britain, but was forced to stop after 149 days and 2,377 kilometres (1,477 mi) due to COVID-19 regulations in Scotland.

In 2021, Dave Chant and Sophie Witter became the first pair to paddle Land's End to John o' Groats, taking 64 paddle days and 25 days off the water due to bad weather and logistical challenges. Their route similarly took them on a mixture of sea, river, and canals but was the longer expedition covering 1,703 kilometres (1,058 mi) from start to finish.

=== SUP yoga ===
SUP yoga is the practice of yoga while on a SUP board. Any SUP board can be used; however, an inflatable SUP (iSUP) is said to be more forgiving for yoga practice. SUP yoga inflatable paddleboards are mostly stable, robust all-around standup paddleboards with some important additional features:

- Slightly wider than normal
- Enlarged, soft, and non-slippery surface in the middle of the board for better grip
- Paddle holders (lateral) for fixing the paddles during the yoga session
- The carrying handle is not located in the middle of the board

SUP yoga is done on calm water, such as lakes and bays. Sometimes a small anchor is attached to the end of the board to keep the board in one location during the SUP yoga session.

=== SUP fishing ===
The introduction of SUPs to the fishing world provided a new low-cost alternative to anglers looking to explore shallow water estuaries in the solo skiff category. The inflatable SUP could be easily traveled with or transported to destination fishing locations by car, boat, and even seaplane and packed as luggage on commercial airlines for use at travel destinations. This portability extended the anglers' fishing range and ability to fish previously unexplored areas. A paddleboard's minuscule draft allows fishermen to access extremely shallow estuaries that skiffs can not, thus increasing their popularity specifically amongst fly fishermen and anglers who are sight fishing. SUPs do not displace as much as a traditional skiff, therefore allowing anglers to approach fish in shallow water without alerting them to their presence.

A few fishing-specific SUPs are designed for mounting an engine, further extending the angler's range and creating a new hybrid SUP category. Powered fishing SUPs combines the advantages of engine-propelled shallow-water fishing vessels with the advantage of stability offered by SUPs when the angler is standing, compared with more traditional methods such as a powered canoe.

== Popularity ==
According to the Outdoor Foundation's 2013 Outdoor Participation Report, standup paddle boarding was listed as the most popular outdoor activity among first-time participants. The report stated that the median age of standup paddle boarders was 28.

The Outdoor Foundation's 2015 Special Report into Paddlesports found that 2.8 million (or 0.9%) of Americans participated in standup paddleboarding in 2014. This was up from 2.0 million in 2013. Ages 25–44 made up the highest percentage of overall contributors (47%). The highest participation rate was teenagers ages 14–17 (1.8%), with males comprising 76% of this age bracket.

== Equipment ==
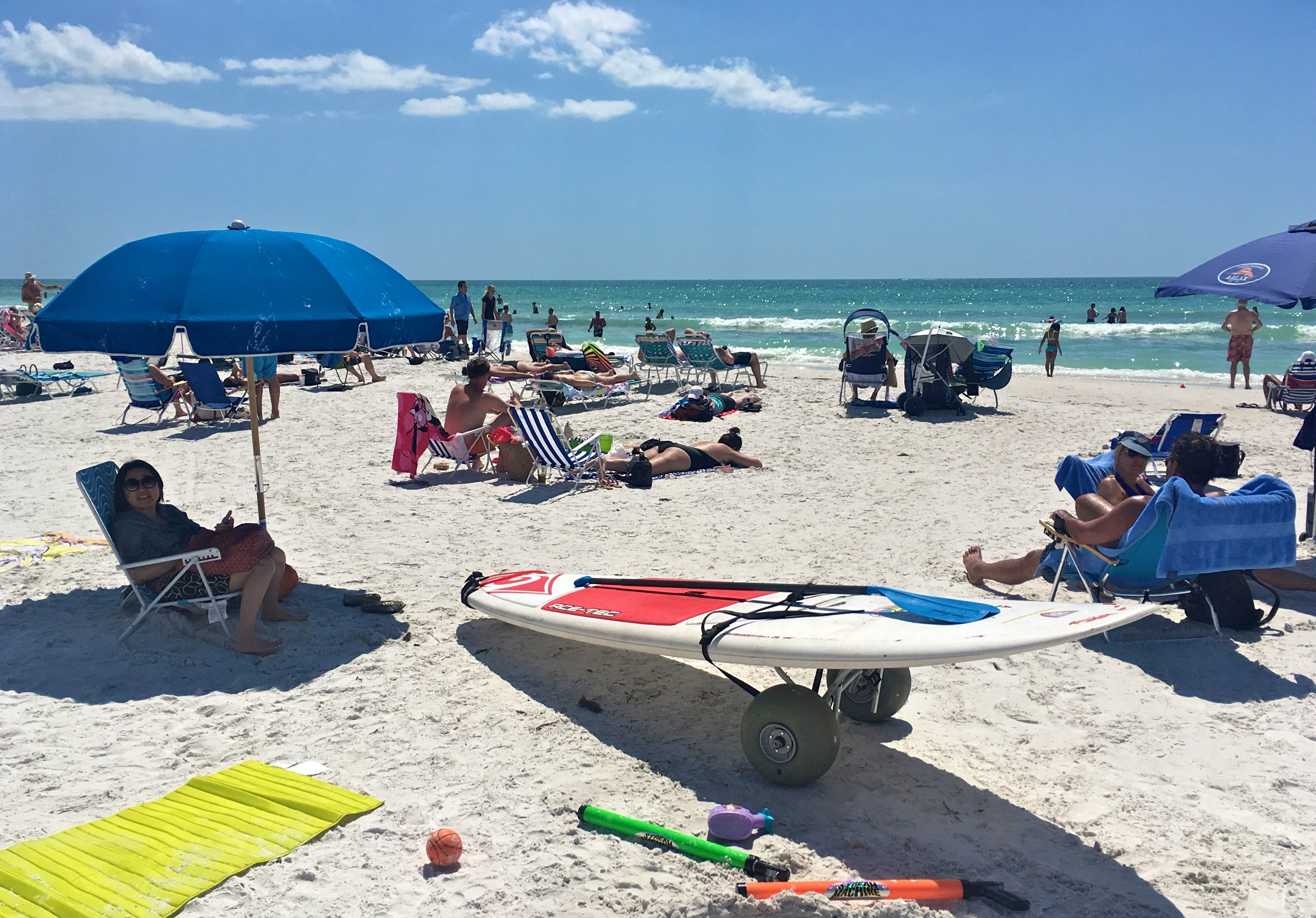
Paddleboard and paddle on the beach at Siesta Key, Florida

=== Board ===
Most SUP boards are in the range of 10 to 12 feet (300 to 370 cm), with boards over 12 feet used mostly for racing, and those under 10 feet primarily used for SUP surfing. The size board a user would choose depends on the user’s weight, although height can also be a factor. Wider boards give better stability for beginners, as well as users who plan to do casual activities with their board, such as yoga, touring, and fishing. Narrower boards are more agile and are mostly used by advanced paddlers and for SUP surfing.

Due to the thickness required of a SUP, solid boards have a foam core that is then covered in one of many materials available, such as wood veneers, fiberglass, or carbon fiber. Epoxy resin can be added on top of those materials to create a stronger board.

Another option is an inflatable SUP, or iSUP, which is built from a drop-stitch core of thousands of fine threads, that is then covered by one or more layers of PVC. iSUP can be used for all types of paddling activities, and when deflated, can be small enough to fit into a backpack.

Many SUP and iSUP boards utilize a single, centered removable fin. This is to aid in stabilization and is used mostly in calm and low wave paddling. Occasionally second and third, smaller fins are added for surfing or additional stability.

=== Paddle ===
Various standup paddleboarders in Japan, 2020

An SUP paddle is used to propel the board and its use across the surface of the water. The paddle consists of a blade, shaft, and handle, and should be between 8 and 15 inches (20 and 38 cm) taller than the user. They are similar to but longer than traditional canoe paddles. They can be constructed from plastic, aluminum, fiberglass, carbon fiber, and wood. The blade of a SUP paddle is designed to be at an angle to the front of the board. This design provides more power as the user pulls themselves through the water.

=== Leash ===
A leash is used to attach the user to the board. It keeps the board from floating away should the user fall off. The leash should be about one foot (30 cm) longer than the board, with one end attached to the tail of the board and the other end attached to the user's ankle or calf. There are two types of leashes: coiled and straight. Choosing which to use depends on the user's preference. It is recommended to only use a leash made for a SUP, as leashes made for surfboards may not be durable enough for heavier boards. It is also recommended that users choose a breakaway style leash for use on rivers due to the potential to get tangled in fallen tree limbs and rocks that are in the water.

=== Additional equipment ===
The U.S. Coast Guard requires users that will be outside of swim and surf areas to have a personal flotation device (PFD) available or worn, as well as a whistle to alert other boaters of their presence. It is also recommended to have a light available for night paddling and a rash guard for sun protection when paddling during the day.

== Safety and regulations ==
=== United States ===
In many areas, no regulations require the use of a PFD while using a SUP board in the surf zone. However, the jurisdictions and rules requiring a PFD may vary according to the type of water: surf zone, international waters, harbors, and other inland waterways. The Coast Guard classifies SUPs as vessels, like canoes or kayaks. Hence, SUP riders are required to wear a PFD when paddling in certain areas outside of the surf zone. Areas such as Myrtle Beach, South Carolina, or Virginia Beach, Virginia, closely regulate beach and surf zones, requiring the use of leashes on a SUP board similar to the law for surfboards. These regulations and requirements may be enforced seasonally during high-tourism seasons or all year. It is important to use a quick-release belt when paddling in whitewater conditions as this allows the paddler to safely detach from a tangled leash.

=== United Kingdom ===
No regulations require the use of a personal flotation device (PFD) while using a SUP board in the surf. In flat water environments, localized regulations may require the use of a PFD such as on lakes, rivers, and inland waterways. In a teaching environment, risk assessments by SUP schools and clubs may require the use of PFDs for less confident standup paddle boarders. The use of a leash is always recommended in all paddling environments and is a key piece of safety equipment.

== Competition ==
In August 2020, the Court of Arbitration for Sport (CAS) determined that both the International Surfing Association (ISA) and International Canoe Federation (ICF) can hold official standup paddleboard competitions, although the ISA alone will be recognized as the governing body of the Olympic level. However, the only ISA competition approved for the Olympic competitions of 2020 and 2024 was the shortboard.

The ISA's World Championships were first held in Peru (2012, 2013), with the following editions held in Nicaragua (2014), Mexico (2015), Fiji (2016), Denmark (2017), China (2018), and El Salvador (2019).
