= Army Cadet Force =

British youth organization

Army Cadet Force (ACF)
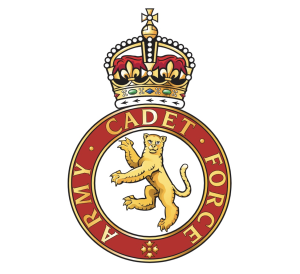
- Army Cadet Force Insignia
- Founded: 1860
- Country: United Kingdom
- Type: Volunteer Youth Organisation of the British Army
- Size: 38,180 cadets (as of 1 April 2023); 8,020 Cadet Force Adult Volunteers
- Headquarters: Regional Command (British Army)
- Motto: To Inspire to Achieve
- Website: https://armycadets.com/

Commanders
- Commander Cadets: Major general James Senior
- Colonel in Chief: Vacant
- National Honorary Colonel: Lorraine Kelly
- National Ambassador: Jordan Wylie

The Army Cadet Force (ACF), generally shortened to Army Cadets, is a British national youth organisation sponsored by the United Kingdom's Ministry of Defence and the British Army. Along with the Sea Cadet Corps and the Air Training Corps, the ACF make up the Community Cadet Forces. It is a separate organisation from the Combined Cadet Force which provides similar training within principally private schools.

Although sponsored by the Ministry of Defence, the ACF is not part of the British Army, and as such cadets are not subject to military law or military 'call up' but is funded by the MOD. Some cadets do, however, go on to enlist in the armed forces later in life.

The Army Cadet Charitable Trust UK (ACCT UK) is a registered charity that acts in an advisory role to the Ministry of Defence and other Government bodies on matters connected with the ACF.

As of 1 April 2023, there are 38,180 cadets, and 8,020 Cadet Force Adult Volunteers (CFAVs).

== History ==
=== Formation and development ===
In 1859 the British Army was heavily committed to suppressing the Indian Mutiny which left a shortage of Armed Troops in Britain to dissuade or repel a French invasion which at the time was a very real threat. At this time the War Office made the decision to organize local Militia units (predecessors of the Territorial Army), into a nationwide Volunteer Reserve Force which it names "the Volunteers". A number of these Volunteers formed their own Cadet Companies, and during the 1860 Volunteer review by Queen Victoria one unit - the Queen's Westminster's - paraded their Cadet Company alongside their adult Companies.

In 1889 renowned social reformer Octavia Hill formed the first independent Cadet Battalion in Southwark. She considered strongly that the military context of the Volunteer Cadet Companies could be used to socialise urban youths struggling for direction, and wrote that "There is no organisation which I have found that influences the boys so powerfully for good as our cadets ... and if such ideals can be brought before the young lad before he gets in with a gang of loafers it may make all the difference to his life". At this time recruitment for the Cadet Forces was limited to young men "who had passed the age of make-believe"; Hill invited a serving officer of the Derbyshire Regiment to set up the company, and such was its popularity that its numbers had to be capped at 160 cadets.

The late Victorian period was when the time of social change began to take hold in Britain and Adam Gray - who was considered to be a pioneer in Social Work - founded Independent Cadet Corps units. The formation of Cadet units also spread to the colonies. The Bermuda Cadet Corps was formed at the turn of the century with detachments in the schools of the British Army's Bermuda Garrison and the Royal Navy's dockyard, as well as a handful of civilian schools; its cadets wore the cap badge of the Bermuda Volunteer Rifle Corps, to which the Bermuda Cadet Corps was attached.

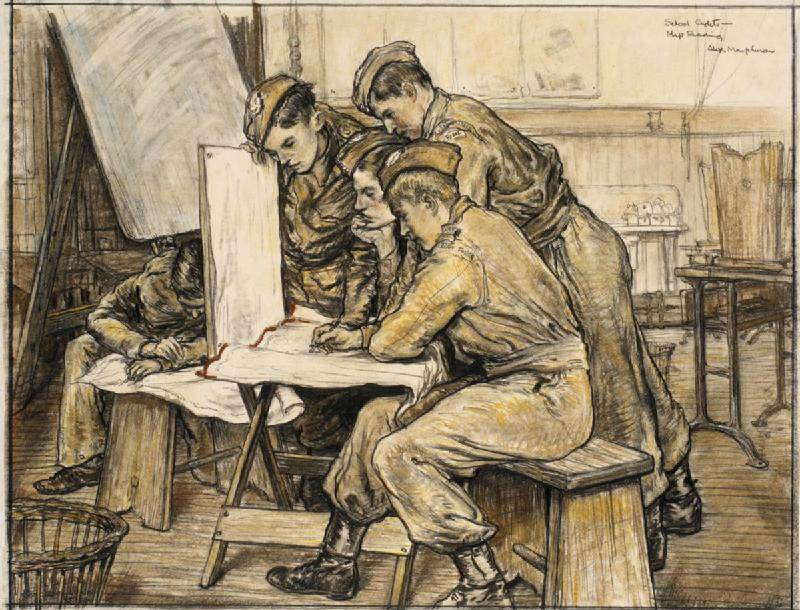
School Cadets map reading during the Second World War

In 1908, when the Territorial Force was formed, both the Volunteer and Independent Cadet Companies came under the control of the Territorial Forces Association under the new name of the Cadet Force, whilst the Public School units were part of the Officer Training Corps.

In 1914 at the onset of World War I there was a massive expansion of the Cadet Force; at this time the War Office took back control of the organisation and administration of all Cadet Forces from their Territorial Associations and once again integrated the units into the central war effort.

At the onset of World War II the Cadet Forces supported the Home Guard at a time when there was a significant threat of German invasion; this led to the War Office in 1942 re-assuming administration of Cadet Forces, which at this time consisted of the Cadet Force, Sea Cadet Corps (SCC), and the Air Training Corps (ATC) (named in 1941). When it resumed administration in 1942, the title Army Cadet Force (ACF) was bestowed upon the Cadet Force, leading in 1945 to the BNCA changing its name to the Army Cadet Force Association (ACFA).

Following the publication of the Amery Report by the government in 1957, the ACF agreed to undertake the tasks in The Duke of Edinburgh's Award as a part of cadet training.

In 1959, also as a result of the Amery Report, a centralized Cadet Training Centre was established at Frimley Park, which remains the home of the Cadet Forces.

In 1960 the ACF celebrated its 100th anniversary with a review of the ACF and CCF in the grounds of Buckingham Palace by Queen Elizabeth II and Prince Philip, Duke of Edinburgh.

Prior to 1982, females were unable to join the ACF, though they were able to join an attached unit (if there was one at that location) of the Girls Venture Corps which had been formed in the early years of the Second World War. Female instructors and cadets were formally enrolled into the ACF following numerous pilot schemes over several years; this led to the introduction of the ACF APC Syllabus in 1990, which noticeably dropped the requirement for hand-to-hand combat and included a major overhaul of instruction, tactics, and subjects. Today nearly 30% of Army Cadets are girls.

In 2010 the Cadet movement celebrated its 150th anniversary with over 150 events in communities up and down the country, and beyond, under the banner of Cadet 150. The main ceremonial event took place on 6 July 2010, when over 1,700 Cadets and adult volunteers paraded down the Mall for inspection by His Royal Highness, Charles the Prince of Wales before joining friends, family, and VIP guests at a garden party in the grounds of Buckingham Palace.

The Army Cadet Force was also a member of The National Council for Voluntary Youth Services (NCVYS), as an organisation with a voluntary and community youth focus until it closed in 2016.

In 2018, after the theft of three Drill Purpose L103A2 rifles (modified SA80 assault rifles) from an Army Cadet Hall in Newport-on-Tay Drill purpose rifles have been taken into quarantine by the MOD; it was realised during the ensuing police investigation that the Drill Purpose rifles could be modified to fire live rounds.

In 2021 the Army Cadet Force Association (ACFA) was renamed the Army Cadet Charitable Trust UK(ACCTUK). This organisation is a registered charity and continues to play a vital role in the life of the ACF.

=== Investigation into sexual abuse ===
In 2012, payouts made to victims of sexual abuse across all Cadet Forces totalled £1,475,844. In 2013 payouts totalled £64,782, and in 2014 payouts totalled £544,213. In 2017, a BBC Panorama episode entitled "Cadet Abuse Cover-Up" highlighted sexual abuse cases in the Community Cadet Forces. In the years 2012 to 2017 there were 201 allegations of sexual abuse made against ACF volunteers, including historical allegations. 158 cases were referred to the Police for investigation, and 62 offenders were dismissed.

=== Deaths on Exercises ===
The Cadet Forces claim a tight safety programme, and that injuries or more serious incidents are rare. A freedom of information request to the Ministry of Defence revealed that a total of 10 cadets have died whilst taking part in cadet duties and activities. 5 fatalities were due to Road Traffic Accidents, 3 fatalities were due to aircraft accidents, 1 fatality was due to a boating incident and 1 fatality was due to substance abuse. In 1998, a cadet was fatally injured on a fieldcraft training exercise.

== Structure and organisation ==
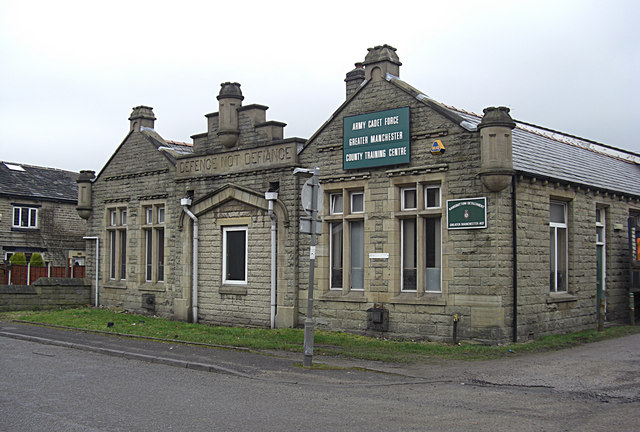
Army Cadet Training Centre, Ramsbottom

Most British counties have centralised cadet forces that make up the ACF as a national whole. The counties (or known as sectors in London) are generally split into companies, each of which includes several detachments, the name given to a unit of cadets that parade in a particular town or village. Some battalions or counties are affiliated with a certain Regiment or Corps within the British Army, and wear their insignia including cap badge, colour of beret and stable belt subject to individual county/area regulations.

== Cadet Force Adult Volunteers ==
=== Adult Instructors ===
Prospective Adult Instructors begin as a Civilian Assistant (CA) before passing an enhanced disclosure. After completing the Familiarization and Assessment weekend (F&A) the Adult Volunteer is appointed as a Probationary Instructor (PI) (also taught/referred to as a Potential Instructor in Cadet Force lessons) at this stage they gain the use of the title Cadet Force Adult Volunteer (CFAV). They will attend 1 further training event to be classed as a "Safe Person" after completing modules on child protection, unit administration and introduction to the ACF. After this event the CFAV will attend further training at county / sector level. Only once completed they are invited to attend the Basic Instructors Course (BIC) held over one week at brigade level and run by a Cadet Training Team (CTT). On successful completion of this course they will be appointed to the rank of Sergeant Instructor (SI). Progressive training takes place for Adult Instructors, as with cadets, an Adult Instructor may take part in a variety of different courses. An example of a further course which takes place at CTC Frimley Park is the Adult Leadership and Management Course. On successful completion of a course like this (which demonstrates the ability to plan and manage detachment level training) an AI is eligible for promotion to the rank of Staff Sergeant Instructor (SSI). The Exercise Conducting Officer's (ECO) and Cadet Drill instructor Course (CADIC) are also available to AIs and the further ranks of Sergeant Major Instructor (SMI) and Regimental Sergeant Major Instructor (RSMI) are possible on completion of the King George VI course.

=== Officers ===
The other route a Cadet Force Adult Volunteer (CFAV) in the ACF may take is that of becoming a commissioned officer. The CFAV will apply and partake in the same selection process as above, however once a Probationary Instructor, the individual may apply or be nominated to become a commissioned officer. To do so, as of 2006, the individual must then attend a Cadet Forces Commissions Board (CFCB), similar to an Army Officer Selection Board though less physically demanding. The applicant will be assessed on their literacy, problem solving, and leadership ability. Successful applicants will then be appointed to a Cadet Forces Commission, which replaced the previous Army Reserve General List Group B commission in 2017.

=== Staff costs ===
The Cadet Force is one of the few voluntary organisations that pays its volunteer staff for their time as an optional Volunteers Allowance (VA). These staff can receive up to 50 days pay per year (Depending on unit size and local budgets), they also receive subsistence and travel expenses for attendance on evenings, weekends and annual camps. In 2009/10 pay bill for ACF part-time staff was £14,632,160 and their expenses totalled £368,349.

=== Safeguarding ===
Like most organisations involving young people, all adult volunteers are required to undergo a Disclosure and Barring Service (DBS) check before having unsupervised contact with cadets.

== Activities ==
=== Army Cadet Syllabus ===
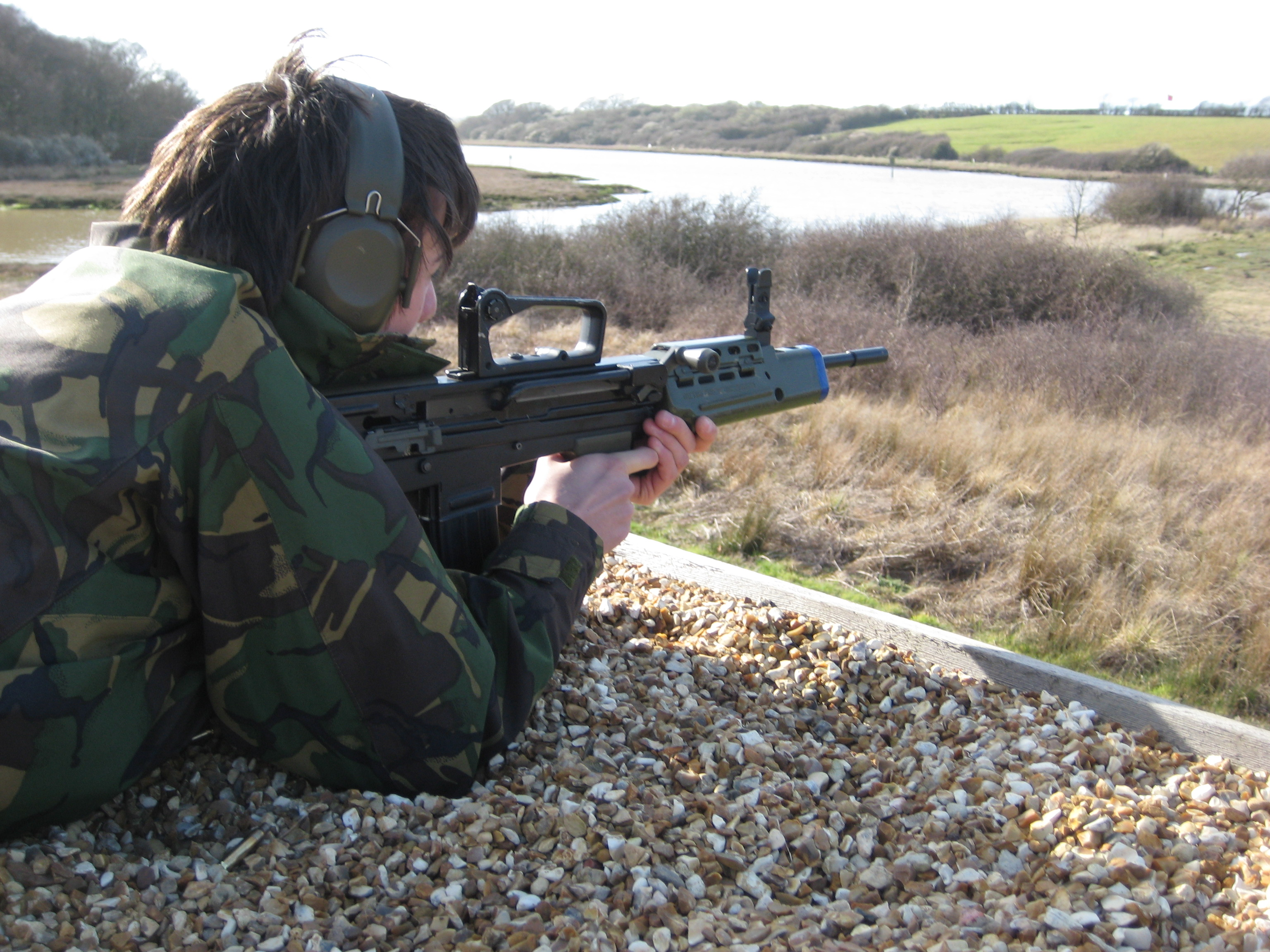
A Cadet Fires the L98A1 GP Rifle

Army Cadet Syllabus [ACS] (the army cadet syllabus brought about in June 2022) is the training syllabus of the ACF and is divided into five levels each covering the core subjects but in more detail as they progress.

- Basic/Recruit (introductory training)
- 1 Star (cadets learn the rudiments of each subject)
- 2 Star (cadets learn each subject in more depth)
- 3 Star (cadets master each subject)
- 4 Star (complete two progressive subjects or courses)
- Master Cadet (cadets must successfully complete the Master Cadet Course held at CTC Frimley following a recommendation from their Cadet Commandant). Cadets must have passed Senior Cadet Instructors Cadre (SCIC) and 4 Star Fieldcraft before attempting the Master Cadet course.

=== Core subjects ===
- Drill and Turnout
- Military Knowledge
- Fieldcraft
- Skill at Arms
- Shooting
- Navigation
- Expedition Training
- First Aid
- Physical Training
- Community Engagement

==== Drill and turnout ====
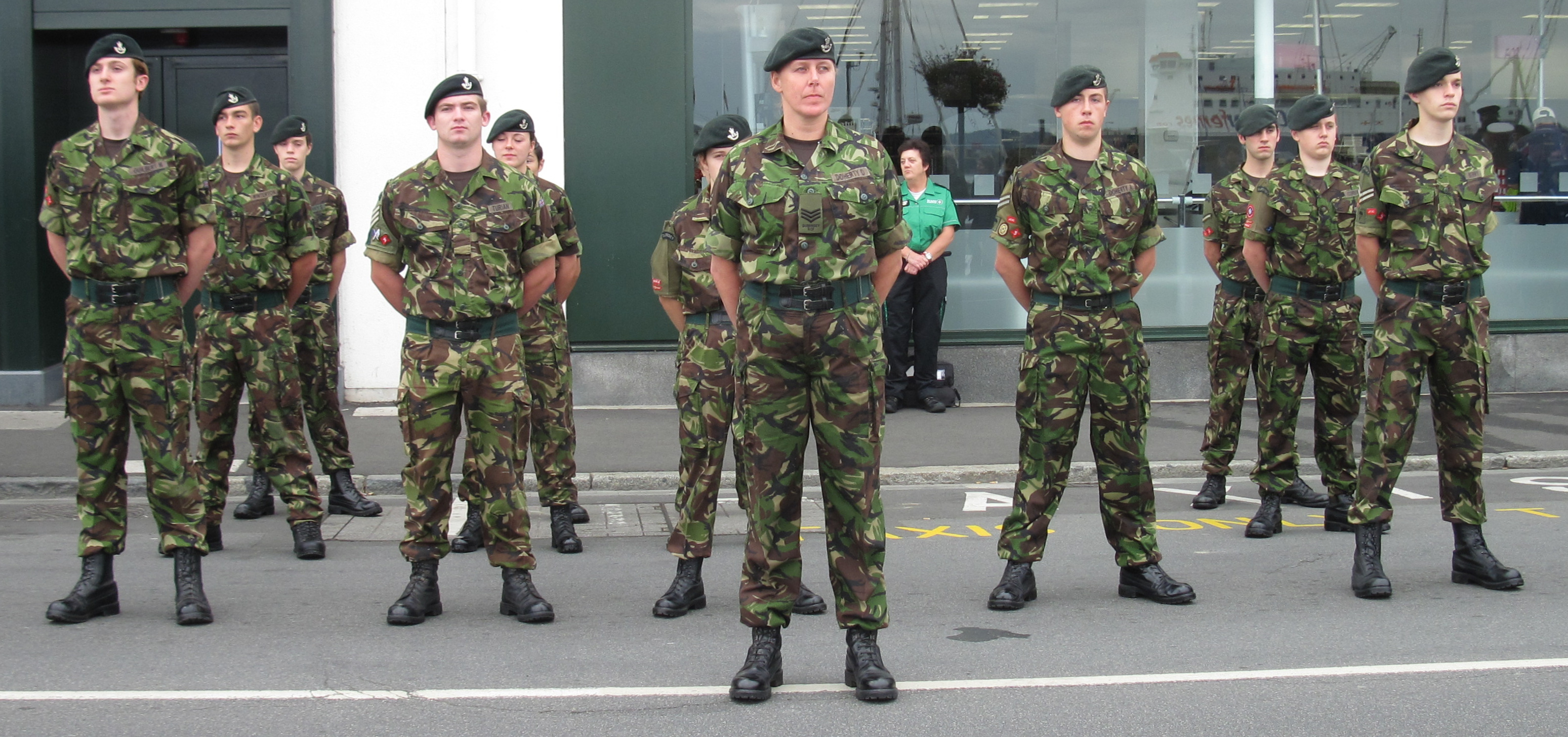
Cadets during parade and church service in Saint Peter Port, Guernsey, 16 September 2012

Cadets are taught a subset of the drill movements taught to the regular army. They begin by learning basic foot drill and may progress to learn now optional rifle drill and banner drill as interest courses, or when their detachment / company needs someone for the role. They are also taught how to wear and service their issued uniform.

==== Fieldcraft ====
In fieldcraft lessons, cadets learn infantry skills such as patrolling, section battle drills, ambush drills, harbour routines, and how to survive in the field. Field exercises can take place once every few months, and at annual camp.

==== Skill at Arms and Shooting ====
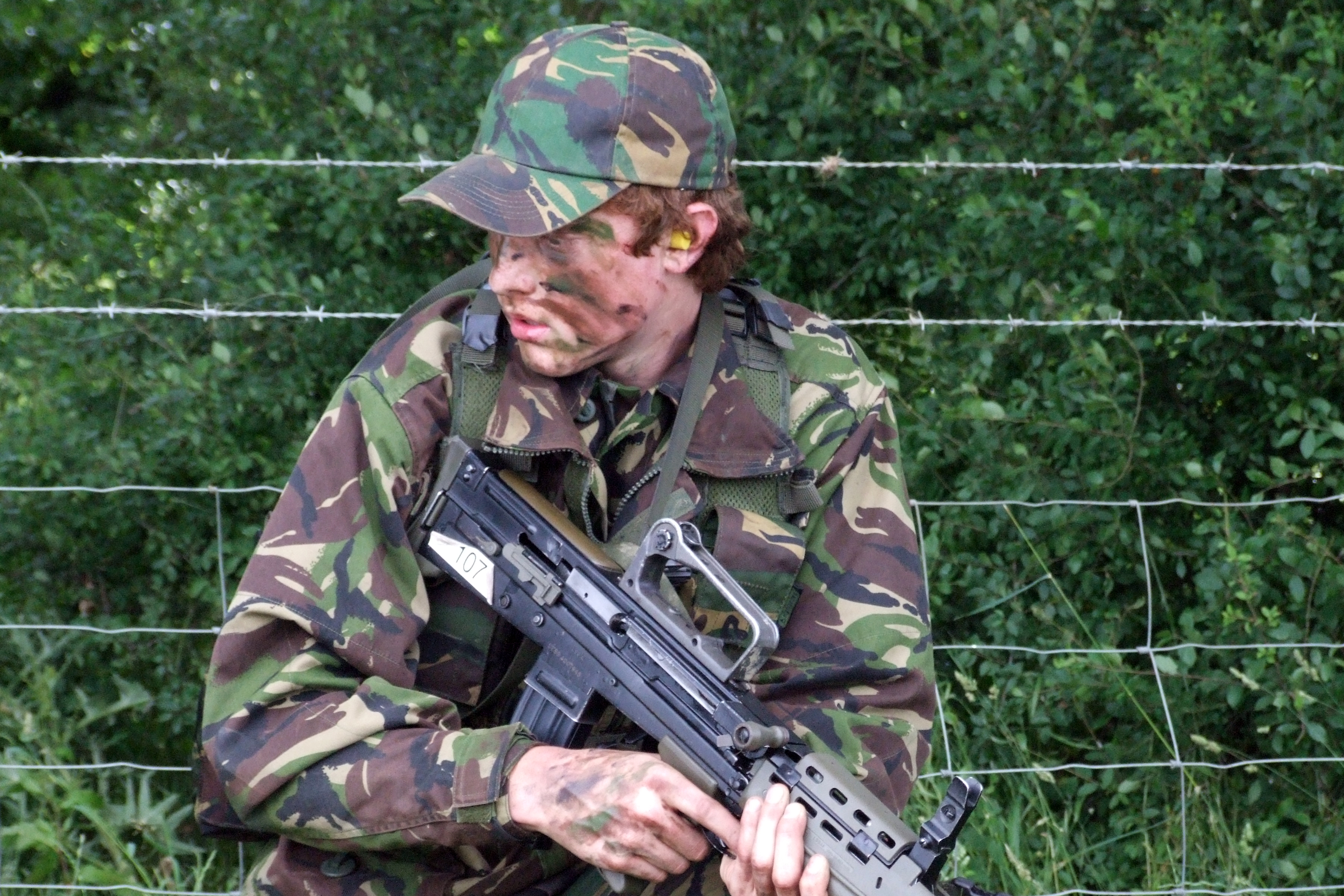
A cadet with the L98A1 Cadet General Purpose (GP) Rifle

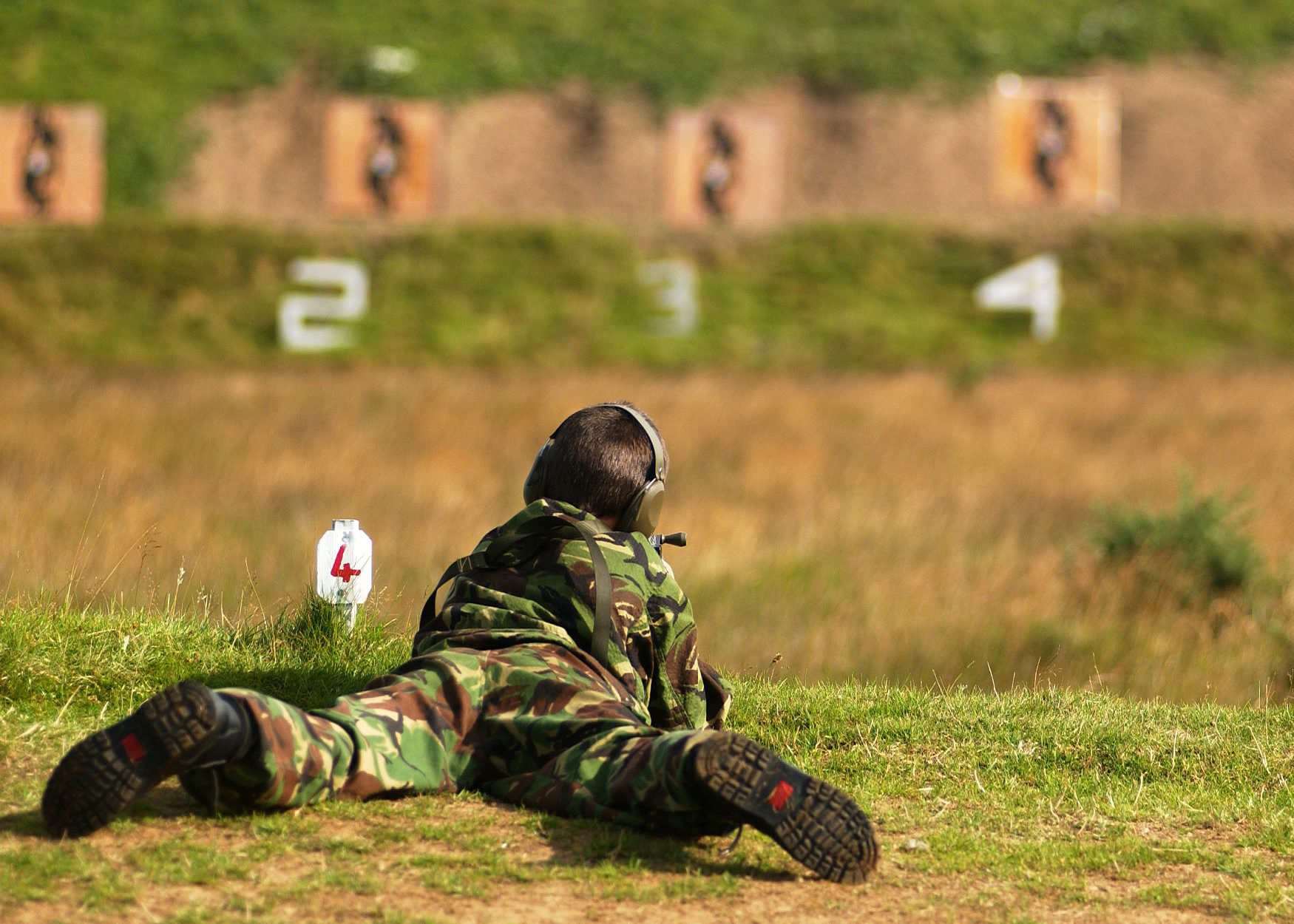
At the Wiltshire Army Cadet Force Annual Camp 2005, the cadets were allowed to fire live rounds at targets

An Army cadet can train on one of 4 different weapon systems. Each with its own unique characteristics.

The MoD allocates over five and half million rounds of 5.56mm ammunition to Cadet Training each year.

Air Rifle

Cadets will begin with the BSA Scorpion .177 air rifle introduced in the mid 2010s.

Small Bore Target Rifle Cadets can be trained on the .22 calibre Small Bore Target Rifle. In 2015 the cadet forces made the decision to start retirement and decommissioning of the No.8 rifle, this was replaced after trials and selection by the L144A1 Cadet Small Bore Target Rifle (CSBTR) manufactured by Savage Arms and rolled out gradually to Counties and Contingents. By early 2018 this roll out was complete. It is to be withdrawn without replacement in 2028.

L98A2 Cadet GP Rifle

The primary weapon of the cadet forces is the L98A2 Cadet GP Rifle this is a cadet specific version of the British Armed Forces' L85A2 SA80 which has been adapted to fire only on repetition (semi-automatic) and therefore does not have a change lever, the weapon system is chambered in the NATO 5.56x45mm cartridge. In order to become proficient in this weapon system and pass the one-star Skill at Arms (SAA) test, cadets must show they can handle the weapon safely, perform stoppage drills, and field strip the weapon for daily cleaning, in addition to passing one-star Skill at Arms the cadet also receives a Weapon Handling Test (WHT) pass which must be re-qualified every 6 months.

Cadet Target Rifle

In addition to the L98A2, the cadet forces also use a number of weapons to foster and develop marksmanship and competitive shooting, the largest of these being the L81A2 Cadet Target Rifle which is a cadet version of the Parker-Hale M82. This weapon is chambered in 7.62x51mm NATO. It is to be withdrawn without replacement in 2026.

Competitions

Cadets can enter various shooting competitions, including the ACF Cadet 100 .22 Rifle Competition and the CCRS Country Life (Green Howards) Small-bore .22 Rifle Competition.

==== Navigation ====
Cadets are introduced to maps and the use of a compass at a progressive stages. They are given the skills to read Ordnance Survey maps, identifying signs and features moving into more complex information utilising the compass such as bearings, back bearings and resection.

==== First aid ====
As part of the training syllabus Cadets are taught First Aid to recognised standards and are awarded relevant certificates in line with the St John Ambulance award scheme.

==== Community Engagement ====
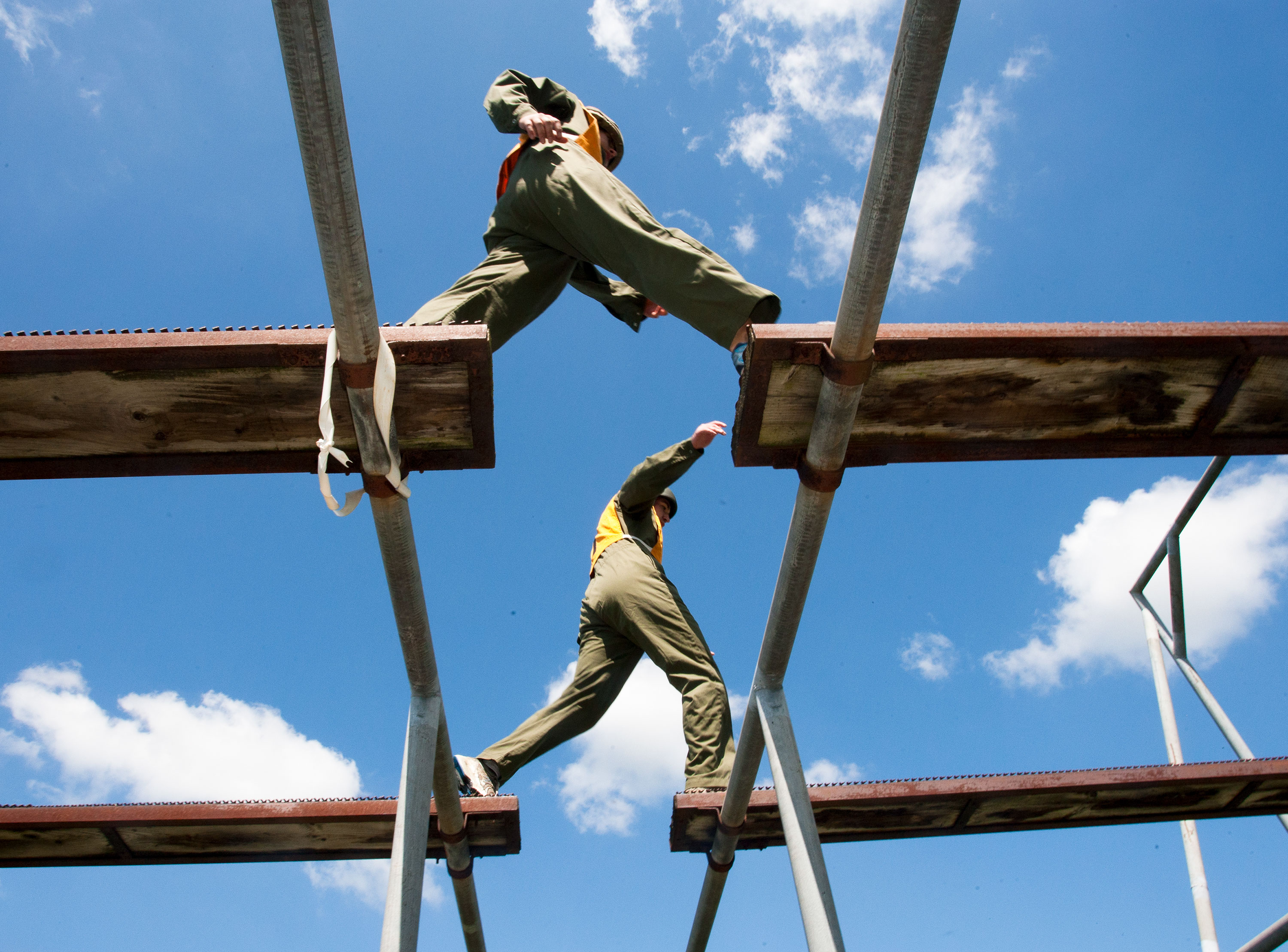
Cadets tackle an Army Assault Course

These community projects enrich local knowledge and encourage good citizenship, usually a cadet can contribute to their community by charity collection, public parades, assisting local services and helping at public events. This involvement within the community is important for improving confidence and social skills.

==== Communications & Information Systems ====
Communications & Information Systems (CIS) is the name for the signals training in the ACF. Cadets learn about the history of signalling, how to send messages over radios and how to erect masts. They are trained on PRRs (Personal Role Radios) which are used between a small group, with each person having one; and PRC 710 Radios, which are used by a Section Radio Operator to communicate at Company Level.

Cadets can take part in competitions such as Exercise Rolling Thunder, using all the skills taught to compete nationally.

==== Duke of Edinburgh's Award ====
The Duke of Edinburgh's Award is a voluntary, non-competitive programme of practical, cultural and adventurous activities for young people aged 14–25 (year 9, if they're a cadet). A young person can undertake a DofE programme at three levels, Bronze (year 9), Silver (year 10) and Gold (16+). Each have differing criteria for entry and the level of commitment necessary to gain each award.

==== Leadership training ====
Leadership training is an important part of the ACF training programme, with training available at higher levels too. Most areas run NCO courses, designed to help newly promoted NCOs to perform their duties well, or to train those eligible for promotion. There are also a number of courses run centrally by the ACF. This includes the Junior Cadet Instructors Cadre (run locally at a county level).

==== Master Cadet Course ====
The Master Cadet Course was introduced in 1989 to advance to the leadership, instructional and administrative abilities of post 4-star cadets. It is held at Cadet Training Centre Frimley Park in Surrey. Passing both this course and the Senior Cadet Instructors' Cadre makes the candidate eligible to be appointed as a Master Cadet.

The following criteria must be met to be eligible for the course:

- Aged 16 years old or older
- Hold the rank of sergeant or above
- Have passed fieldcraft as a progressive subject at 4-star level

==== Cadet Leadership Courses ====
The Aim of the Cadet Leadership Courses (CLC) is: To develop cadets' initiative and self-reliance and to exercise them in the problems of practical leadership.

== Uniform ==
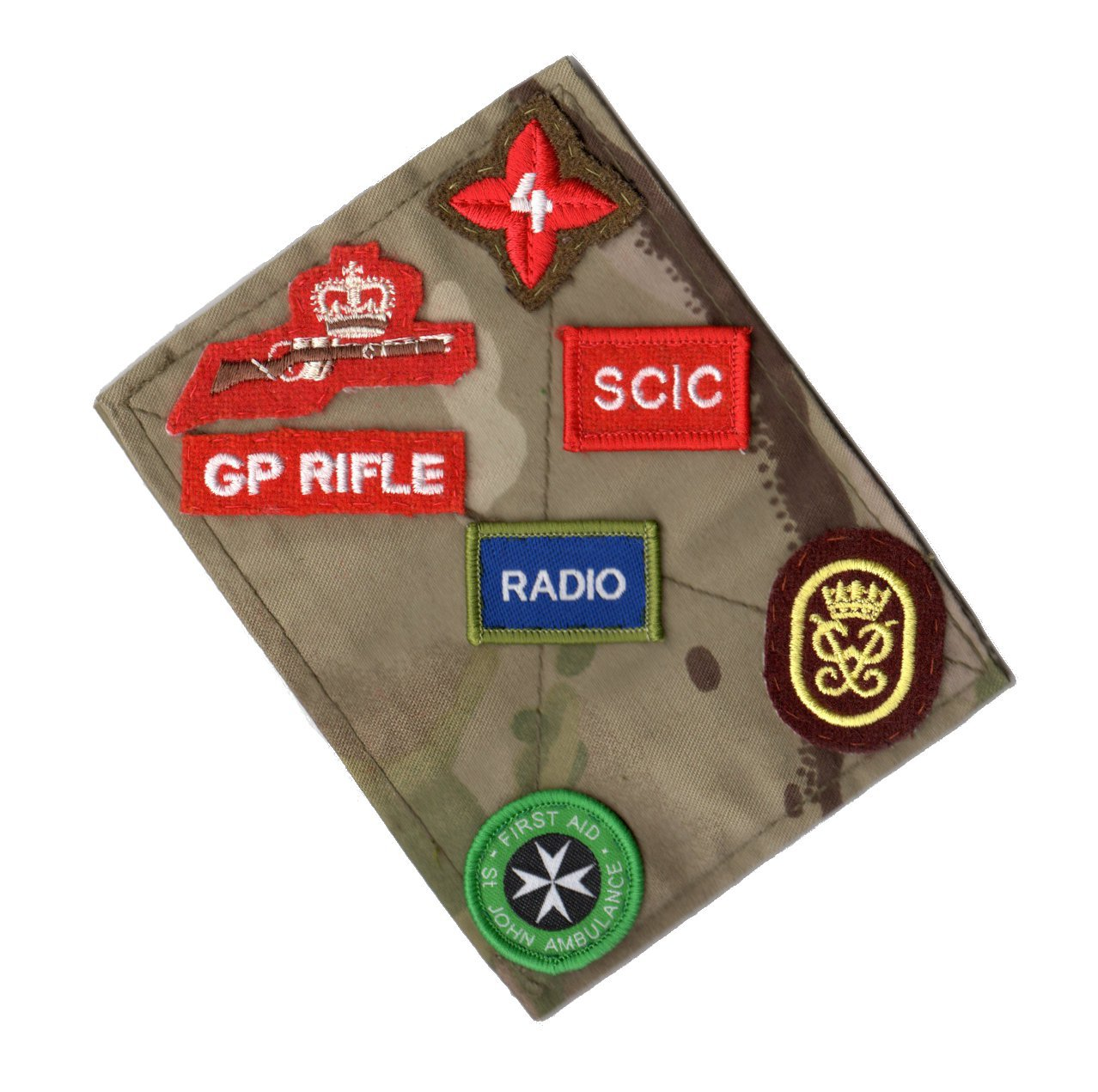
Example cadet blanking plate.

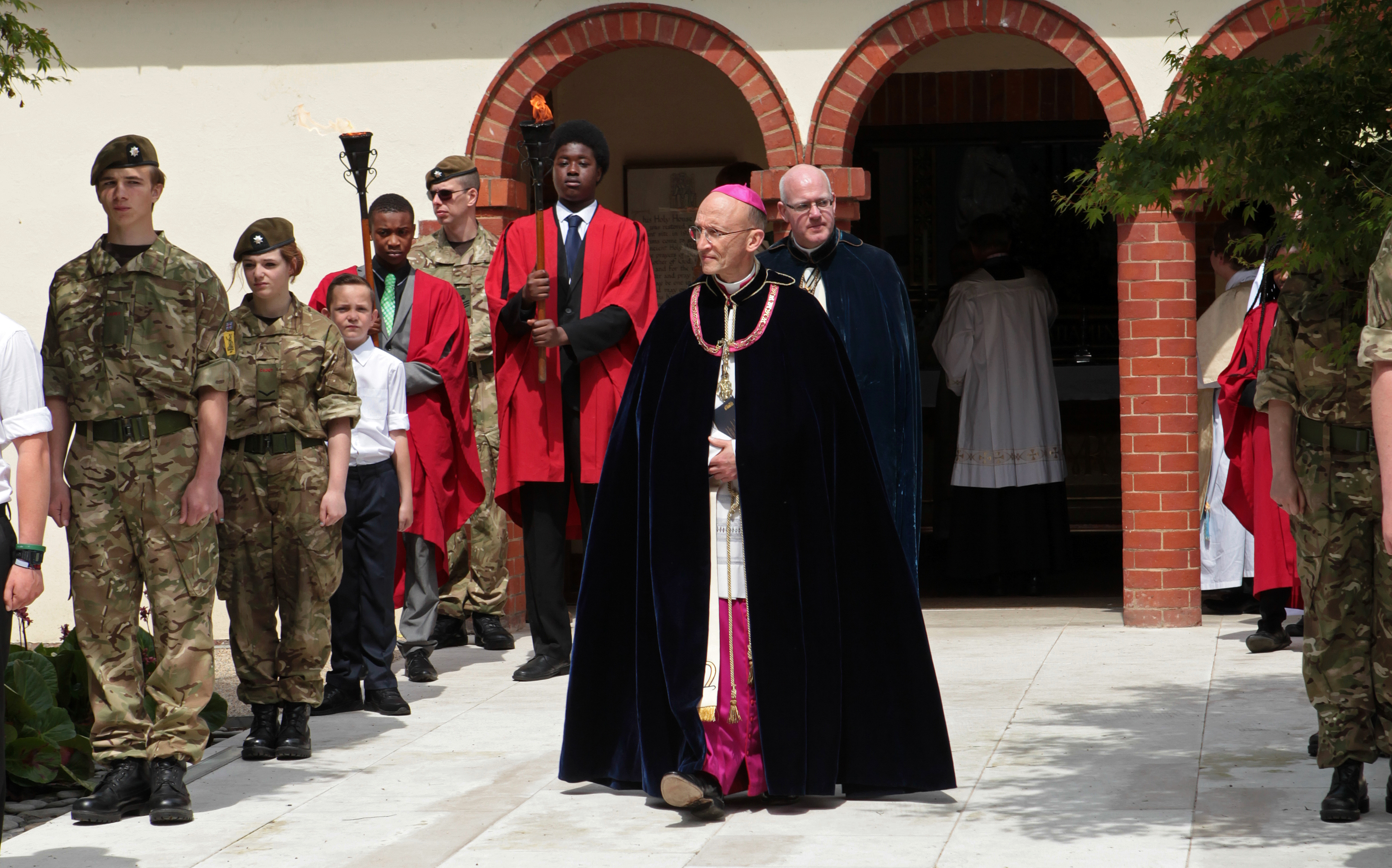
Cadets in Multi-Terrain Pattern uniform and berets, 2014.

All Cadets and CFAVs are issued with Personal Clothing System Combat Uniform (PCS-CU) in Multi-Terrain Pattern (MTP). Cadets are scaled to receive the following:

- Headdress (depends on regimental affiliation) – Beret, Tam o' Shanter, Glengarry or Caubeen
- Two PCS Lightweight Jackets
- Two pairs of PCS trousers
- PCS Windproof Smock
- Thermal Undershirt
- Two Olive Undershirts
- Working Belt
- two pairs of woolly socks

Some counties may charge a small deposit for uniform that is refundable on its return. All CFAVs must have "ACF" visible at all times on their uniform and cadets wear rank slides titled "CADET". Boots must be purchased by the cadet or their parents, they are typically not supplied.

Colours of the ACF Stable Belt

Tactical Recognition Flashes are not to be worn by Cadet Force Adult Volunteers (CFAVs) or cadets irrespective of any affiliation to a Corps or Regiment. Cadets and CFAVs do wear county and contingent flashes of the Army Cadet Force.

=== Mayor's Cadet ===
Some mayors appoint a member of the cadet forces to the role of Mayor's Cadet. The cadet may wear a special badge or carry a pace stick to indicate their role.

=== Lord Lieutenant's Cadet ===
Cadets can be appointed to this role and are then entitled to wear the Lord Lieutenant's Cadet badge as well as issue Number 2 Dress.

== Ranks ==
Ranks in the ACF follow the pattern of those in the British Army.

=== Cadet ranks ===
As well as learning new skills by working through the ACS syllabus, experienced cadets can be awarded a rank. As the Army allows its soldiers to take on responsibility and leadership as non-commissioned officers (NCOs), so too does the ACF.

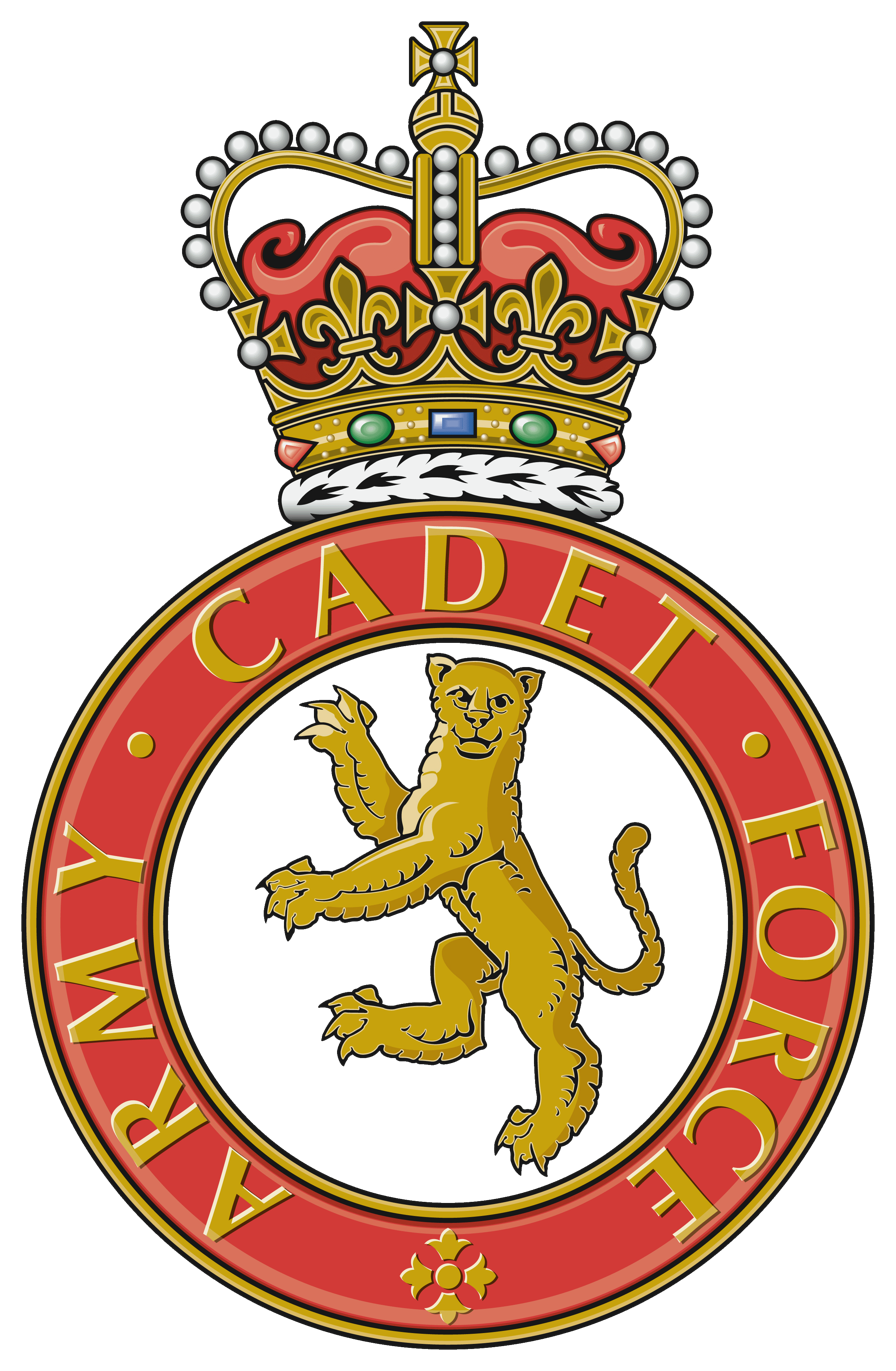
Army Cadet Force
Army Cadet Force	Cadet under officer	Cadet regimental sergeant major	Cadet company sergeant major	Cadet staff sergeant	Cadet sergeant	Cadet corporal	Cadet lance corporal	Cadet	Recruit
Army Cadet Force	Cdt UO	Cdt RSM	Cdt CSM	Cdt SSgt	Cdt Sgt	Cdt Cpl	Cdt LCpl	Cdt	Rct

Cadet NCOs wear the issued cadet rank slides, pictured above.

Although promotion is based on merit rather than progression through the ACS syllabus, the following criteria must be met before a cadet is eligible for promotion:

- Cadet Lance Corporal – Passed ACS 1 Star
- Cadet Corporal – Passed ACS 2 Star
- Cadet Sergeant – Passed ACS 3 Star and the JCIC course
- Cadet Staff/Colour Sergeant – Passed ACS 4 Star and the SCIC course
- Cadet Sergeant Major/Company Sergeant Major – Passed ACS 4 Star and the SCIC course
- Cadet Regimental Sergeant Major – Passed Master Cadet and the SCIC course
- Cadet Under Officer – Passed Master Cadet and the SCIC course

In some instances, cadets that do not meet the requirements for these ranks can be promoted with the agreement of the ACF Cadet Commandant.

==== Staff cadets (obsolete) ====
Due to the COVID-19 pandemic shutting down camps, from 2020 cadets who were over the age of 18, had completed APC 3-Star and held the rank of Sergeant or above could become a "Staff Cadet". These cadets wore a rank slide with the words 'STAFF CADET' embroidered above their rank insignia. A staff cadet could remain a cadet until their 20th birthday.

=== CFAV ranks ===
The adults who help to run the ACF are collectively known as Cadet Force Adult Volunteers (CFAVs). CFAVs wear the badges of rank as worn by Army NCOs with the addition of the letters ACF under the badge.

Insignia The letters ACF must be displayed in combination with the badge							
Rank	Adult Under officer (AUO)	Warrant officer class 1 (WO1)	Warrant officer class 2 (WO2)	Staff sergeant (S/Sgt)	Sergeant (Sgt)	Probationary instructor (PI)	Civilian assistant

Former ranks

Insignia	
Rank	Probationary sergeant instructor (PSI)

=== Officer ranks ===
Insignia The letters ACF must be displayed in combination with the badge						
Rank	Colonel	Lieutenant Colonel	Major	Captain	Lieutenant	Second Lieutenant

=== National Honorary Colonel ===
In November 2019, Lorraine Kelly was appointed the first National Honorary Colonel of the Army Cadet Force.

=== National Army Cadet Force Museum ===
In September 2023, the National Army Cadet Force Museum was officially opened by WO2 Johnson Beharry in Wisbech, marking the legacy of Octavia Hill who established the first independent army cadet unit in 1889.

== See also ==
Other elements of the Community Cadet Forces

- Sea Cadet Corps
  - Royal Marines Cadets
- Air Training Corps

Other MoD sponsored cadet forces

- Combined Cadet Force
- Volunteer Cadet Corps

Other Army Cadet organisations

- Australian Army Cadets
- Bermuda Cadet Corps
- Royal Canadian Army Cadets
- Hong Kong Adventure Corps
- New Zealand Cadet Corps

Related articles

- Reserve Forces and Cadets Association
- Cadet Vocational Qualification Organisation (CVQO)
- National Association of Training Corps for Girls
