= Cadet Training Centre, Frimley Park =

Coordinates: 51.316384°N 0.745761°W

- Logo of the Cadet Training Centre, Frimley Park
- Active: 1957 – present
- Country: United Kingdom
- Allegiance: British Armed Forces
- Branch: British Army
- Type: Training
- Role: Cadet Forces Training
- Size: 39 Staff
- Part of: Headquarters Regional Command
- Garrison/HQ: Camberley
- Motto: Renovate Animos

Commanders
- Current commander: Lt Col Graham Thorne RA

Frimley Manor, Main Building of CTC Frimley Park

The Cadet Training Centre (CTC), Frimley Park is the home of the Army Cadet Force (ACF) and the Combined Cadet Force Army (CCF (A)).

== History ==
The House was commissioned by the Tichbourne Family in 1699. It served as a maternity hospital during the Second World War. It was subsequently used by the Officers' Association (OA), and by the Women's Royal Army Corps (WRAC), before it was handed over for use as a training college for the Cadet Forces of the British Armed Forces in 1957, opening for its first course in 1959.

== Location ==
CTC Frimley Park is located on a large site immediately to the south west of Frimley Park Hospital, situated near Junction 4 of the M3 motorway.

== Courses ==
The CTC Frimley Park is used primarily for the training of the cadet forces. Training courses include:

=== Adult courses ===
- Senior Officers Course
- Area Commanders Course
- KGVI Leadership Course
- Adult and Leadership Management Course (ALM)
- Skill at Arms Instructor (Cadet) Course
- SA (M) (07) Cadet Course
- First Aid Course
- Healthy Minds Course
- Various Cadet Force Conferences

=== Cadet courses ===
- Master Cadet
- Annual Champion Cadet Competition
- Senior Cadet Conference
