= 2019 ICF Canoe Sprint World Championships – Men's K-1 200 metres =

Men's K-1 200 metres at the 2019 ICF Canoe Sprint World Championships
- Venue: Olympic Centre of Szeged
- Location: Szeged, Hungary
- Dates: 21–24 August
- Competitors: 58 from 58 nations
- Winning time: 34.86

Medalists
gold medal	Liam Heath	Great Britain
silver medal	Strahinja Stefanović	Serbia
bronze medal	Carlos Garrote	Spain

The men's K-1 200 metres competition at the 2019 ICF Canoe Sprint World Championships in Szeged took place at the Olympic Centre of Szeged.

== Schedule ==
The schedule was as follows:

Date	Time	Round
Wednesday 21 August 2019	17:35	Heats
Friday 23 August 2019	16:33	Semifinals
Saturday 24 August 2019	09:10	Final C
Saturday 24 August 2019	09:15	Final B
Saturday 24 August 2019	11:41	Final A

All times are Central European Summer Time (UTC+2)

== Results ==
=== Heats ===
The five fastest boats in each heat, plus the fastest remaining boat advanced to the semifinals.

==== Heat 1 ====
Rank	Kayaker	Country	Time	Notes
1	Artūras Seja	Lithuania	34.36	QS
2	Timo Haseleu	Germany	35.17	QS
3	Kaspar Sula	Estonia	35.60	QS
4	Ioannis Odysseos	Cyprus	36.40	QS
5	Álvaro Combet de Larenne	Switzerland	36.87	QS
6	Ernest Irnazarov	Uzbekistan	36.95	
7	Florin Vlase	Romania	43.44	
8	Jimmy Jonas	Palau	53.94	
–	Ahmed Sameer Jumaah Faris	Iraq	DNS	

==== Heat 2 ====
Rank	Kayaker	Country	Time	Notes
1	Maxime Beaumont	France	34.21	QS
2	Kolos Csizmadia	Hungary	34.41	QS
3	Alex Scott	Canada	35.09	QS
4	Vid Debeljak	Slovenia	35.18	QS
5	Amin Boudaghi	Iran	38.08	QS
6	Ali Hassan	Egypt	38.25	
7	Serghei Vihrov	Moldova	39.00	
8	Abdelmajid Jabbour	Morocco	40.27	
–	César de Cesare	Ecuador	DNS	

==== Heat 3 ====
Rank	Kayaker	Country	Time	Notes
1	Liam Heath	Great Britain	33.71	QS
2	Dmytro Danylenko	Ukraine	34.45	QS
3	Rubén Rézola	Argentina	34.92	QS
4	Brandon Wei Cheng Ooi	Singapore	36.26	QS
5	Ruslan Moltaev	Kyrgyzstan	36.55	QS
6	Cristian Canache	Venezuela	37.46	
7	Amado Cruz	Belize	38.31	
8	Saidilhomkhon Nazirov	Tajikistan	39.01	
–	Dissanayake M. D. C. Dissanayake	Sri Lanka	DNS	

==== Heat 4 ====
Rank	Kayaker	Country	Time	Notes
1	Carlos Garrote	Spain	34.42	QS
2	Chrisjan Coetzee	South Africa	34.72	QS
3	Praison Buasamrong	Thailand	35.17	QS
4	Stav Mizrahi	Israel	35.36	QS
5	Joona Mäntynen	Finland	35.60	QS
6	Bram Sanderson	Dominica	56.83	
–	Nikola Maleski	North Macedonia	DSQ	
–	Eddy Barranco	Puerto Rico	DNS	

==== Heat 5 ====
Rank	Kayaker	Country	Time	Notes
1	Strahinja Stefanović	Serbia	33.97	QS
2	Badri Kavelashvili	Georgia	34.36	QS
3	Roberts Akmens	Latvia	34.80	QS
4	Cho Gwang-hee	South Korea	35.18	QS
5	Lin Yung-chieh	Chinese Taipei	36.00	QS
6	Nicholas Robinson	Trinidad and Tobago	40.32	
7	Pita Taufatofua	Tonga	58.19	

==== Heat 6 ====
Rank	Kayaker	Country	Time	Notes
1	Manfredi Rizza	Italy	34.19	QS
2	Petter Menning	Sweden	34.36	QS
3	Filip Šváb	Czech Republic	35.25	QS
4	Dzmitry Tratsiakou	Belarus	38.17	QS
5	Darko Savić	Bosnia and Herzegovina	40.07	QS
6	Joaquim Manhique	Mozambique	40.27	
7	Adam Aris	Malaysia	40.60	
8	Saphan Swaleh	Pakistan	47.22	

==== Heat 7 ====
Rank	Kayaker	Country	Time	Notes
1	Evgenii Lukantsov	Russia	34.58	QS
2	Kristian Dushev	Bulgaria	34.74	QS
3	Paweł Kaczmarek	Poland	34.86	QS
4	Sergii Tokarnytskyi	Kazakhstan	35.37	QS
5	Stanton Collins	United States	36.29	QS
6	Marko Lipovac	Croatia	36.35	qS
7	So Pak Yin	Hong Kong	38.19	
8	Oussama Djabali	Algeria	39.52	

=== Semifinals ===
Qualification was as follows:

All first and second-place boats, plus the fastest third-place boat advanced to the A final.
All other third-place boats, all fourth-place boats and the two fastest fifth-place boats advanced to the B final.
All other fifth-place boats, all sixth-place boats and the three fastest seventh-place boats advanced to the C final.

==== Semifinal 1 ====
Rank	Kayaker	Country	Time	Notes
1	Strahinja Stefanović	Serbia	34.33	QA
2	Artūras Seja	Lithuania	34.47	QA
3	Kristian Dushev	Bulgaria	34.80	QB
4	Vid Debeljak	Slovenia	35.11	QB
5	Chrisjan Coetzee	South Africa	35.18	QC
6	Filip Šváb	Czech Republic	35.73	QC
7	Marko Lipovac	Croatia	36.14	qC
8	Álvaro Combet de Larenne	Switzerland	36.24	
9	Brandon Wei Cheng Ooi	Singapore	36.32	

==== Semifinal 2 ====
Rank	Kayaker	Country	Time	Notes
1	Maxime Beaumont	France	34.13	QA
2	Dzmitry Tratsiakou	Belarus	34.66	QA
3	Paweł Kaczmarek	Poland	34.78	QB
4	Timo Haseleu	Germany	34.96	QB
5	Badri Kavelashvili	Georgia	35.03	qB
6	Rubén Rézola	Argentina	35.35	QC
7	Praison Buasamrong	Thailand	35.42	qC
8	Amin Boudaghi	Iran	38.74	
9	Darko Savić	Bosnia and Herzegovina	40.09	

==== Semifinal 3 ====
Rank	Kayaker	Country	Time	Notes
1	Liam Heath	Great Britain	33.87	QA
2	Manfredi Rizza	Italy	34.21	QA
3	Dmytro Danylenko	Ukraine	34.52	QB
4	Cho Gwang-hee	South Korea	34.90	QB
5	Alex Scott	Canada	35.15	qB
6	Kaspar Sula	Estonia	35.51	QC
7	Stav Mizrahi	Israel	36.17	
8	Stanton Collins	United States	36.27	
9	Lin Yung-chieh	Chinese Taipei	36.58	

==== Semifinal 4 ====
Rank	Kayaker	Country	Time	Notes
1	Carlos Garrote	Spain	34.19	QA
2	Evgenii Lukantsov	Russia	34.42	QA
3	Petter Menning	Sweden	34.50	qA
4	Kolos Csizmadia	Hungary	34.56	QB
5	Roberts Akmens	Latvia	35.27	QC
6	Sergii Tokarnytskyi	Kazakhstan	35.28	QC
7	Ioannis Odysseos	Cyprus	36.01	qC
8	Joona Mäntynen	Finland	36.31	
9	Ruslan Moltaev	Kyrgyzstan	36.50	

=== Finals ===
==== Final C ====
Competitors in this final raced for positions 19 to 27.

Rank	Kayaker	Country	Time
1	Roberts Akmens	Latvia	36.05
2	Sergii Tokarnytskyi	Kazakhstan	36.21
3	Chrisjan Coetzee	South Africa	36.30
4	Kaspar Sula	Estonia	36.42
5	Filip Šváb	Czech Republic	36.43
6	Rubén Rézola	Argentina	36.57
7	Praison Buasamrong	Thailand	36.76
8	Marko Lipovac	Croatia	36.90
9	Ioannis Odysseos	Cyprus	37.15

==== Final B ====
Competitors in this final raced for positions 10 to 18.

Rank	Kayaker	Country	Time
1	Dmytro Danylenko	Ukraine	35.45
2	Kolos Csizmadia	Hungary	35.69
3	Paweł Kaczmarek	Poland	35.89
4	Badri Kavelashvili	Georgia	35.97
5	Vid Debeljak	Slovenia	36.10
6	Cho Gwang-hee	South Korea	36.14
7	Timo Haseleu	Germany	36.17
8	Alex Scott	Canada	36.20
9	Kristian Dushev	Bulgaria	36.37

==== Final A ====
Competitors in this final raced for positions 1 to 9, with medals going to the top three.

Rank	Kayaker	Country	Time
1st place, gold medalist(s)	Liam Heath	Great Britain	34.86
2nd place, silver medalist(s)	Strahinja Stefanović	Serbia	35.04
3rd place, bronze medalist(s)	Carlos Garrote	Spain	35.12
4	Maxime Beaumont	France	35.36
5	Manfredi Rizza	Italy	35.38
6	Petter Menning	Sweden	35.40
7	Evgenii Lukantsov	Russia	35.51
8	Artūras Seja	Lithuania	35.56
9	Dzmitry Tratsiakou	Belarus	35.81
