= 2017 ICF Canoe Sprint World Championships – Men's K-1 200 metres =

Men's K-1 200 metres at the 2017 ICF Canoe Sprint World Championships
- Venue: Sportcentrum Račice
- Location: Račice, Czech Republic
- Dates: 25–27 August
- Competitors: 39 from 39 nations
- Winning time: 33.733

Medalists
gold medal	Liam Heath	Great Britain
silver medal	Aleksejs Rumjancevs	Latvia
bronze medal	Evgenii Lukantsov	Russia

The men's K-1 200 metres competition at the 2017 ICF Canoe Sprint World Championships in Račice took place at the Sportcentrum Račice.

== Schedule ==
The schedule was as follows:

Date	Time	Round
Friday 25 August 2017	09:58	Heats
Saturday 26 August 2017	15:59	Semifinals
Sunday 27 August 2017	09:01	Final C
Sunday 27 August 2017	09:06	Final B
Sunday 27 August 2017	10:51	Final A

All times are Central European Summer Time (UTC+2)

== Results ==
=== Heats ===
The seven fastest boats in each heat, plus the fastest remaining boat advanced to the semifinals.

==== Heat 1 ====
Rank	Kayaker	Country	Time	Notes
1	Bence Horváth	Hungary	34.428	QS
2	Carlos Arévalo	Spain	35.217	QS
3	Rubén Rézola	Argentina	35.239	QS
4	Kristian Dushev	Bulgaria	35.594	QS
5	Andrea Di Liberto	Italy	35.700	QS
6	Ivan Semykin	Ukraine	35.889	QS
7	Alex Scott	Canada	36.028	QS
8	Niklas Vettanen	Finland	36.072	qS

==== Heat 2 ====
Rank	Kayaker	Country	Time	Notes
1	Aleksejs Rumjancevs	Latvia	35.243	QS
2	Maxime Beaumont	France	35.287	QS
3	Sergii Tokarnytskyi	Kazakhstan	35.637	QS
4	Edson Silva	Brazil	35.921	QS
5	Matthew Goble	Australia	36.376	QS
6	Yasuhiro Suzuki	Japan	38.759	QS
7	Juan Pablo Lopez	Puerto Rico	39.776	QS
8	Arambam Gyanjit Singh	India	40.726	

==== Heat 3 ====
Rank	Kayaker	Country	Time	Notes
1	Petter Menning	Sweden	35.636	QS
2	Miroslav Zaťko	Slovakia	36.242	QS
3	Cho Gwang-hee	South Korea	36.503	QS
4	Dzmitry Natynchyk	Belarus	37.414	QS
5	Stav Mizrahi	Israel	37.603	QS
6	Tuan Yen-Yu	Chinese Taipei	37.747	QS
7	Ievgen Karabuta	Azerbaijan	38.053	QS
8	Abdelmajid Jabbour	Morocco	40.914	

==== Heat 4 ====
Rank	Kayaker	Country	Time	Notes
1	Liam Heath	Great Britain	35.004	QS
2	Artūras Seja	Lithuania	35.837	QS
3	Jonathan Delombaerde	Belgium	36.065	QS
4	Chrisjan Coetzee	South Africa	36.243	QS
5	Filip Šváb	Czech Republic	36.587	QS
6	Ali Aghamirzaei	Iran	37.043	QS
7	Ahmed Sameer Jumaah	Iraq	39.160	QS
8	Chen Xiang	China	40.760	

==== Heat 5 ====
Rank	Kayaker	Country	Time	Notes
1	Marko Dragosavljević	Serbia	35.601	QS
2	Timo Haseleu	Germany	35.734	QS
3	Evgenii Lukantsov	Russia	35.751	QS
4	Paweł Kaczmarek	Poland	35.923	QS
5	Orion Pilo	Denmark	36.534	QS
6	Mervyn Toh Ying Jie	Singapore	37.201	QS
7	Kirill Bondar	Kyrgyzstan	38.884	QS

=== Semifinals ===
Qualification was as follows:

All first and second-place boats, plus the fastest third-place boat advanced to the A final.
All other third-place boats, all fourth-place boats and the two fastest fifth-place boats advanced to the B final.
All other fifth-place boats, all sixth-place boats and the three fastest remaining boats advanced to the C final.

==== Semifinal 1 ====
Rank	Kayaker	Country	Time	Notes
1	Marko Dragosavljević	Serbia	35.205	QA
2	Aleksejs Rumjancevs	Latvia	35.255	QA
3	Carlos Arévalo	Spain	35.477	QB
4	Andrea Di Liberto	Italy	35.816	QB
5	Filip Šváb	Czech Republic	35.955	QC
6	Niklas Vettanen	Finland	36.161	QC
7	Dzmitry Natynchyk	Belarus	36.216	qC
8	Chrisjan Coetzee	South Africa	36.244	qC
9	Ievgen Karabuta	Azerbaijan	38.777	

==== Semifinal 2 ====
Rank	Kayaker	Country	Time	Notes
1	Bence Horváth	Hungary	34.360	QA
2	Evgenii Lukantsov	Russia	35.004	QA
3	Artūras Seja	Lithuania	35.315	QB
4	Edson Silva	Brazil	35.993	QB
5	Orion Pilo	Denmark	36.065	QC
6	Tuan Yen-Yu	Chinese Taipei	37.615	QC
7	Ahmed Sameer Jumaah	Iraq	38.371	
8	Yasuhiro Suzuki	Japan	39.260	
9	Cho Gwang-hee	South Korea	45.732	

==== Semifinal 3 ====
Rank	Kayaker	Country	Time	Notes
1	Sergii Tokarnytskyi	Kazakhstan	35.109	QA
2	Petter Menning	Sweden	35.271	QA
3	Kristian Dushev	Bulgaria	35.509	QB
4	Jonathan Delombaerde	Belgium	35.559	QB
5	Timo Haseleu	Germany	35.682	qB
6	Ivan Semykin	Ukraine	36.032	QC
7	Matthew Goble	Australia	36.404	
8	Ali Aghamirzaeijenaghrad	Iran	36.854	
9	Kirill Bondar	Kyrgyzstan	37.865	

==== Semifinal 4 ====
Rank	Kayaker	Country	Time	Notes
1	Liam Heath	Great Britain	34.187	QA
2	Maxime Beaumont	France	34.854	QA
3	Rubén Rézola	Argentina	35.304	qA
4	Paweł Kaczmarek	Poland	35.504	QB
5	Miroslav Zaťko	Slovakia	35.865	qB
6	Alex Scott	Canada	36.098	QC
7	Stav Mizrahi	Israel	36.131	qC
8	Mervyn Toh Ying Jie	Singapore	36.981	
9	Juan Pablo Lopez	Puerto Rico	39.276	

=== Finals ===
==== Final C ====
Competitors in this final raced for positions 19 to 27.

Rank	Kayaker	Country	Time
1	Niklas Vettanen	Finland	35.601
2	Filip Šváb	Czech Republic	35.734
3	Alex Scott	Canada	35.884
4	Orion Pilo	Denmark	35.929
5	Chrisjan Coetzee	South Africa	35.951
6	Ivan Semykin	Ukraine	36.412
7	Stav Mizrahi	Israel	36.501
8	Dzmitry Natynchyk	Belarus	37.384
9	Tuan Yen-Yu	Chinese Taipei	37.501

==== Final B ====
Competitors in this final raced for positions 10 to 18.

Rank	Kayaker	Country	Time
1	Carlos Arévalo	Spain	34.964
2	Artūras Seja	Lithuania	35.336
3	Andrea Di Liberto	Italy	35.714
4	Paweł Kaczmarek	Poland	35.814
5	Kristian Dushev	Bulgaria	35.842
6	Timo Haseleu	Germany	35.853
7	Jonathan Delombaerde	Belgium	35.925
8	Edson Silva	Brazil	36.014
9	Miroslav Zaťko	Slovakia	36.608

==== Final A ====
Competitors in this final raced for positions 1 to 9, with medals going to the top three.

Rank	Kayaker	Country	Time
1st place, gold medalist(s)	Liam Heath	Great Britain	33.733
2nd place, silver medalist(s)	Aleksejs Rumjancevs	Latvia	34.439
3rd place, bronze medalist(s)	Evgenii Lukantsov	Russia	34.639
4	Maxime Beaumont	France	34.660
5	Marko Dragosavljević	Serbia	34.733
6	Petter Menning	Sweden	34.812
7	Rubén Rézola	Argentina	34.981
8	Sergii Tokarnytskyi	Kazakhstan	34.996
–	Bence Horváth	Hungary	DSQ (Note: Bence Horváth, who originally finished in second place, was disqualified on 25 March 2018 after it emerged he tested positive for EPO on 12 June 2017.); ~~34.070~~
