= 2018 ICF Canoe Sprint World Championships – Men's K-1 200 metres =

Men's K-1 200 metres at the 2018 ICF Canoe Sprint World Championships
- Venue: Centro de Alto Rendimento de Montemor-o-Velho
- Location: Montemor-o-Velho, Portugal
- Dates: 25–26 August
- Competitors: 36 from 36 nations
- Winning time: 35.259

Medalists
gold medal	Carlos Garrote	Spain
silver medal	Artūras Seja	Lithuania
bronze medal	Evgenii Lukantsov	Russia

The men's K-1 200 metres competition at the 2018 ICF Canoe Sprint World Championships in Montemor-o-Velho took place at the Centro de Alto Rendimento de Montemor-o-Velho.

== Schedule ==
The schedule was as follows:

Date	Time	Round
Saturday 25 August 2018	15:00	Heats
Sunday 26 August 2018	10:00	Semifinals
Sunday 26 August 2018	11:50	Final B
Sunday 26 August 2018	12:18	Final A

All times are Western European Summer Time (UTC+1)

== Results ==
=== Heats ===
The six fastest boats in each heat, plus the three fastest remaining boats advanced to the semifinals.

==== Heat 1 ====
Rank	Kayaker	Country	Time	Notes
1	Balázs Birkás	Hungary	36.323	QS
2	Carlos Garrote	Spain	36.416	QS
3	Jon Schofield	Great Britain	36.763	QS
4	Csaba Zalka	Slovakia	37.213	QS
5	Mirnazim Javadov	Azerbaijan	37.573	QS
6	Niklas Vettanen	Finland	38.510	QS
7	Tom Brennan	Ireland	38.740	
8	Karim Abdelsamie	Egypt	39.497	
9	Joaquim Manhique	Mozambique	42.830	

==== Heat 2 ====
Rank	Kayaker	Country	Time	Notes
1	Artūras Seja	Lithuania	36.003	QS
2	Aleksejs Rumjancevs	Latvia	36.443	QS
3	Stephen Bird	Australia	36.539	QS
4	Rubén Rézola	Argentina	36.889	QS
5	Kaspar Sula	Estonia	37.286	QS
6	Edson Silva	Brazil	37.469	QS
7	Filip Šváb	Czech Republic	37.553	qS
8	Akira Komata	Japan	39.253	
9	Abdelmajid Jabbour	Morocco	43.210	

==== Heat 3 ====
Rank	Kayaker	Country	Time	Notes
1	Manfredi Rizza	Italy	36.445	QS
2	Evgenii Lukantsov	Russia	36.491	QS
3	Jonathan Delombaerde	Belgium	36.745	QS
4	Dominik Crête	Canada	36.905	QS
5	Petter Menning	Sweden	37.241	QS
6	Hugo Rocha	Portugal	37.355	QS
7	Stav Mizrahi	Israel	37.451	qS
8	Alvaro Baturone	Switzerland	39.728	
9	Sebastián Delgado	Uruguay	46.682	

==== Heat 4 ====
Rank	Kayaker	Country	Time	Notes
1	Badri Kavelashvili	Georgia	35.672	QS
2	Marko Dragosavljević	Serbia	35.885	QS
3	Maxime Beaumont	France	36.245	QS
4	Aleksandr Senkevych	Ukraine	36.305	QS
5	Kristian Dushev	Bulgaria	36.525	QS
6	Paweł Kaczmarek	Poland	36.628	QS
7	Chrisjan Coetzee	South Africa	37.912	qS
8	Stanton Collins	United States	39.005	
9	Vladimir Veljanoski	Macedonia	44.639	

=== Semifinals ===
Qualification in each semi was as follows:

The fastest three boats advanced to the A final.
The next three fastest boats advanced to the B final.

==== Semifinal 1 ====
Rank	Kayaker	Country	Time	Notes
1	Balázs Birkás	Hungary	34.816	QA
2	Evgenii Lukantsov	Russia	34.943	QA
3	Aleksejs Rumjancevs	Latvia	34.980	QA
4	Maxime Beaumont	France	35.073	QB
5	Aleksandr Senkevych	Ukraine	35.867	QB
6	Petter Menning	Sweden	36.033	QB
7	Mirnazim Javadov	Azerbaijan	36.350	
8	Edson Silva	Brazil	36.423	
9	Stav Mizrahi	Israel	37.017	

==== Semifinal 2 ====
Rank	Kayaker	Country	Time	Notes
1	Artūras Seja	Lithuania	34.877	QA
2	Marko Dragosavljević	Serbia	35.291	QA
3	Paweł Kaczmarek	Poland	35.451	QA
4	Kaspar Sula	Estonia	35.727	QB
5	Dominik Crête	Canada	35.794	QB
6	Jonathan Delombaerde	Belgium	35.901	QB
7	Jon Schofield	Great Britain	35.931	
8	Filip Šváb	Czech Republic	35.997	
9	Csaba Zalka	Slovakia	36.447	

==== Semifinal 3 ====
Rank	Kayaker	Country	Time	Notes
1	Carlos Garrote	Spain	35.021	QA
2	Manfredi Rizza	Italy	35.331	QA
3	Badri Kavelashvili	Georgia	35.421	QA
4	Rubén Rézola	Argentina	35.787	QB
5	Stephen Bird	Australia	35.834	QB
6	Hugo Rocha	Portugal	36.014	QB
7	Kristian Dushev	Bulgaria	36.094	
8	Chrisjan Coetzee	South Africa	36.878	
9	Niklas Vettanen	Finland	38.048	

=== Finals ===
==== Final B ====
Competitors in this final raced for positions 10 to 18.

Rank	Kayaker	Country	Time
1	Maxime Beaumont	France	35.109
2	Stephen Bird	Australia	35.543
3	Dominik Crête	Canada	35.703
4	Rubén Rézola	Argentina	35.746
5	Kaspar Sula	Estonia	35.796
6	Aleksandr Senkevych	Ukraine	35.893
7	Hugo Rocha	Portugal	35.936
8	Petter Menning	Sweden	36.286
9	Jonathan Delombaerde	Belgium	36.323

==== Final A ====
Competitors in this final raced for positions 1 to 9, with medals going to the top three.

Rank	Kayaker	Country	Time
1st place, gold medalist(s)	Carlos Garrote	Spain	35.259
2nd place, silver medalist(s)	Artūras Seja	Lithuania	35.366
3rd place, bronze medalist(s)	Evgenii Lukantsov	Russia	35.512
4	Balázs Birkás	Hungary	35.576
5	Aleksejs Rumjancevs	Latvia	35.706
6	Marko Dragosavljević	Serbia	35.806
7	Paweł Kaczmarek	Poland	35.932
8	Manfredi Rizza	Italy	36.116
9	Badri Kavelashvili	Georgia	36.432
