= Canoe sprint at the 2019 European Games – Men's K-1 200 metres =

Men's K-1 200 metres at the 2019 European Games
- Venue: Zaslavl Regatta Course
- Date: 26–27 June
- Competitors: 21 from 21 nations
- Winning time: 38.976

Medalists
gold medal	Maxime Beaumont	France
silver medal	Balázs Birkás	Hungary
bronze medal	Dzmitry Tratsiakou	Belarus

The men's K-1 200 metres canoe sprint competition at the 2019 European Games in Minsk took place between 26 and 27 June at the Zaslavl Regatta Course.

== Schedule ==
The schedule was as follows:

Date	Time	Round
Wednesday 26 June 2019	14:15	Heats
Wednesday 26 June 2019	16:10	Semifinals
Thursday 27 June 2019	14:05	Final B
Thursday 27 June 2019	14:25	Final A

All times are Further-eastern European Time (UTC+3)

== Results ==
=== Heats ===
Heat winners advanced directly to the A final. The next six fastest boats in each heat advanced to the semifinals.

==== Heat 1 ====
Rank	Kayaker	Country	Time	Notes
1	Carlos Garrote	Spain	34.777	QA
2	Manfredi Rizza	Italy	35.102	QS
3	Dzmitry Tratsiakou	Belarus	35.229	QS
4	Aleksejs Rumjancevs	Latvia	35.507	QS
5	Timo Haseleu	Germany	35.677	QS
6	Csaba Zalka	Slovakia	35.709	QS
7	Ronan Foley	Ireland	39.049	QS

==== Heat 2 ====
Rank	Kayaker	Country	Time	Notes
1	Maxime Beaumont	France	34.831	QA
2	Artūras Seja	Lithuania	34.958	QS
3	Paweł Kaczmarek	Poland	35.848	QS
4	Denislav Tsvetanov	Bulgaria	36.446	QS
5	Jakub Zavřel	Czech Republic	37.131	QS
6	Serkan Kakkaç	Turkey	37.633	QS
7	Hugo Rocha	Portugal	38.841	QS

==== Heat 3 ====
Rank	Kayaker	Country	Time	Notes
1	Petter Menning	Sweden	34.900	QA
2	Balázs Birkás	Hungary	34.975	QS
3	Evgenii Lukantsov	Russia	35.146	QS
4	Dmytro Danylenko	Ukraine	35.199	QS
5	Badri Kavelashvili	Georgia	35.227	QS
6	Marko Dragosavljević	Serbia	35.583	QS
7	Vladimir Maleski	North Macedonia	41.028	QS

=== Semifinals ===
The fastest three boats in each semi advanced to the A final. The next four fastest boats in each semi, plus the fastest remaining boat advanced to the B final.

==== Semifinal 1 ====
Rank	Kayaker	Country	Time	Notes
1	Evgenii Lukantsov	Russia	34.733	QA
2	Manfredi Rizza	Italy	35.018	QA
3	Dmytro Danylenko	Ukraine	35.188	QA
4	Marko Dragosavljević	Serbia	35.339	QB
5	Aleksejs Rumjancevs	Latvia	35.349	QB
6	Paweł Kaczmarek	Poland	35.399	QB
7	Csaba Zalka	Slovakia	35.430	QB
8	Jakub Zavřel	Czech Republic	36.293	qB
9	Hugo Rocha	Portugal	36.390	

==== Semifinal 2 ====
Rank	Kayaker	Country	Time	Notes
1	Artūras Seja	Lithuania	34.303	QA, GB
2	Dzmitry Tratsiakou	Belarus	34.543	QA
3	Balázs Birkás	Hungary	34.901	QA
4	Badri Kavelashvili	Georgia	35.118	QB
5	Denislav Tsvetanov	Bulgaria	35.261	QB
6	Timo Haseleu	Germany	35.433	QB
7	Serkan Kakkaç	Turkey	37.301	QB
8	Ronan Foley	Ireland	38.413	
9	Vladimir Maleski	North Macedonia	40.101	

=== Finals ===
==== Final B ====
Competitors in this final raced for positions 10 to 18.

Rank	Kayaker	Country	Time
1	Badri Kavelashvili	Georgia	38.095
2	Timo Haseleu	Germany	38.246
3	Paweł Kaczmarek	Poland	38.304
4	Denislav Tsvetanov	Bulgaria	38.346
5	Aleksejs Rumjancevs	Latvia	38.410
6	Csaba Zalka	Slovakia	38.689
7	Jakub Zavřel	Czech Republic	39.178
8	Marko Dragosavljević	Serbia	39.478
9	Serkan Kakkaç	Turkey	40.238

==== Final A ====
Competitors in this final raced for positions 1 to 9, with medals going to the top three.

Rank	Kayaker	Country	Time
1st place, gold medalist(s)	Maxime Beaumont	France	38.976
2nd place, silver medalist(s)	Balázs Birkás	Hungary	39.149
3rd place, bronze medalist(s)	Dzmitry Tratsiakou	Belarus	39.351
4	Petter Menning	Sweden	39.486
5	Artūras Seja	Lithuania	39.506
6	Evgenii Lukantsov	Russia	39.606
7	Manfredi Rizza	Italy	39.794
8	Carlos Garrote	Spain	39.839
9	Dmytro Danylenko	Ukraine	40.139
