= 2018 ICF Canoe Sprint World Championships – Men's K-4 500 metres =

Men's K-4 500 metres at the 2018 ICF Canoe Sprint World Championships
- Venue: Centro de Alto Rendimento de Montemor-o-Velho
- Location: Montemor-o-Velho, Portugal
- Dates: 25–26 August
- Competitors: 88 from 22 nations
- Winning time: 1:20.056

Medalists
gold medal	Max Rendschmidt; Tom Liebscher; Ronald Rauhe; Max Lemke	Germany
silver medal	Saúl Craviotto; Marcus Walz; Cristian Toro; Rodrigo Germade	Spain
bronze medal	Sándor Tótka; Péter Molnár; Miklós Dudás; István Kuli	Hungary

The men's K-4 500 metres competition at the 2018 ICF Canoe Sprint World Championships in Montemor-o-Velho took place at the Centro de Alto Rendimento de Montemor-o-Velho.

== Schedule ==
The schedule was as follows:

Date	Time	Round
Saturday 25 August 2018	16:05	Heats
Saturday 25 August 2018	17:42	Semifinals
Sunday 26 August 2018	13:25	Final A
Sunday 26 August 2018	13:38	Final B

All times are Western European Summer Time (UTC+1)

== Results ==
=== Heats ===
Heat winners advanced directly to the A final. The next six fastest boats in each heat advanced to the semifinals.

==== Heat 1 ====
Rank	Kayakers	Country	Time	Notes
1	Max Rendschmidt; Tom Liebscher; Ronald Rauhe; Max Lemke	Germany	1:23.513	QA
2	Martin Brzeziński; Rafał Rosolski; Dawid Putto; Norbert Kuczyński	Poland	1:25.170	QS
3	Deniss Volkovs; Roberts Akmens; Kaspars Tiklenieks; Aldis Arturs Vilde	Latvia	1:25.180	QS
4	Franck Le Moël; Guillaume Burger; Étienne Hubert; Guillaume Le Floch Decorchemont	France	1:25.833	QS
5	Dejan Pajić; Simo Boltić; Ervin Holpert; Strahinja Stefanović	Serbia	1:26.583	QS
6	Chrisjan Coetzee; David Rodrigues; Michael Arthur; Nicholas Weeks	South Africa	1:26.590	QS
7	Dmytro Danylenko; Oleh Kukharyk; Dmytro Kostyshen; Denys Lakmanov	Ukraine	1:27.650	QS
8	Viliyan Buchvarov; Hristo Rekov; Todor Kolevski; Veselin Vulchov	Bulgaria	1:29.950	

==== Heat 2 ====
Rank	Kayakers	Country	Time	Notes
1	Saúl Craviotto; Marcus Walz; Cristian Toro; Rodrigo Germade	Spain	1:21.314	QA
2	Emanuel Silva; Messias Baptista; João Ribeiro; David Varela	Portugal	1:23.811	QS
3	Riley Fitzsimmons; Thomas Green; Murray Stewart; Jordan Wood	Australia	1:25.048	QS
4	Samuel Baláž; Csaba Zalka; Milan Fraňa; Tibor Linka	Slovakia	1:25.244	QS
5	Nicola Ripamonti; Alessandro Gnecchi; Andrea Schera; Edoardo Chierini	Italy	1:25.248	QS
6	Dzmitry Tratsiakou; Raman Piatrushenka; Vitaliy Bialko; Dzmitry Natynchyk	Belarus	1:25.491	QS
7	Cosmin Lulciuc; Razvan Albisoru; Aurelian Ciocan; Sorin Cical	Romania	1:26.278	QS

==== Heat 3 ====
Rank	Kayakers	Country	Time	Notes
1	Sándor Tótka; Péter Molnár; Miklós Dudás; István Kuli	Hungary	1:23.554	QA
2	Yury Postrigay; Oleg Gusev; Vitaly Ershov; Vasily Pogreban	Russia	1:25.461	QS
3	Aurimas Lankas; Edvinas Ramanauskas; Mindaugas Maldonis; Simonas Maldonis	Lithuania	1:25.598	QS
4	Omar de Andrés; Pablo de Torres; Ezequiel Di Giacomo; Gonzalo Carreras	Argentina	1:25.641	QS
5	Jakub Zavřel; Josef Dostál; Radek Šlouf; Jan Štěrba	Czech Republic	1:25.851	QS
6	Ryan Cochrane; Marshall Hughes; Nicholas Matveev; Pierre-Luc Poulin	Canada	1:26.141	QS
7	Jon Schofield; Matthew Robinson; Liam Heath; Lewis Fletcher	Great Britain	1:37.138	QS

=== Semifinals ===
Qualification was as follows:

The fastest three boats in each semi advanced to the A final.
The next four fastest boats in each semi, plus the fastest remaining boat advanced to the B final.

==== Semifinal 1 ====
Rank	Kayakers	Country	Time	Notes
1	Yury Postrigay; Oleg Gusev; Vitaly Ershov; Vasily Pogreban	Russia	1:21.653	QA
2	Samuel Baláž; Csaba Zalka; Milan Fraňa; Tibor Linka	Slovakia	1:22.286	QA
3	Riley Fitzsimmons; Thomas Green; Murray Stewart; Jordan Wood	Australia	1:22.523	QA
4	Dejan Pajić; Simo Boltić; Ervin Holpert; Strahinja Stefanović	Serbia	1:22.973	QB
5	Dzmitry Tratsiakou; Raman Piatrushenka; Vitaliy Bialko; Dzmitry Natynchyk	Belarus	1:23.189	QB
6	Omar de Andrés; Pablo de Torres; Ezequiel Di Giacomo; Gonzalo Carreras	Argentina	1:23.349	QB
7	Jon Schofield; Matthew Robinson; Liam Heath; Lewis Fletcher	Great Britain	1:24.076	QB
8	Deniss Volkovs; Roberts Akmens; Kaspars Tiklenieks; Aldis Arturs Vilde	Latvia	1:24.856	qB
9	Chrisjan Coetzee; David Rodrigues; Michael Arthur; Nicholas Weeks	South Africa	1:28.226	

==== Semifinal 2 ====
Rank	Kayakers	Country	Time	Notes
1	Jakub Zavřel; Josef Dostál; Radek Šlouf; Jan Štěrba	Czech Republic	1:21.668	QA
2	Emanuel Silva; Messias Baptista; João Ribeiro; David Varela	Portugal	1:21.741	QA
3	Franck Le Moël; Guillaume Burger; Étienne Hubert; Guillaume Le Floch Decorchemont	France	1:22.135	QA
4	Cosmin Lulciuc; Razvan Albisoru; Aurelian Ciocan; Sorin Cical	Romania	1:23.058	QB
5	Aurimas Lankas; Edvinas Ramanauskas; Mindaugas Maldonis; Simonas Maldonis	Lithuania	1:23.081	QB
6	Martin Brzeziński; Rafał Rosolski; Dawid Putto; Norbert Kuczyński	Poland	1:24.361	QB
7	Nicola Ripamonti; Alessandro Gnecchi; Andrea Schera; Edoardo Chierini	Italy	1:24.515	QB
8	Dmytro Danylenko; Oleh Kukharyk; Dmytro Kostyshen; Denys Lakmanov	Ukraine	1:26.421	
9	Ryan Cochrane; Marshall Hughes; Nicholas Matveev; Pierre-Luc Poulin	Canada	1:27.888	

=== Finals ===
==== Final B ====
Competitors in this final raced for positions 10 to 18.

Rank	Kayakers	Country	Time
1	Dzmitry Tratsiakou; Raman Piatrushenka; Vitaliy Bialko; Dzmitry Natynchyk	Belarus	1:22.752
2	Aurimas Lankas; Edvinas Ramanauskas; Mindaugas Maldonis; Simonas Maldonis	Lithuania	1:24.232
3	Cosmin Lulciuc; Razvan Albisoru; Aurelian Ciocan; Sorin Cical	Romania	1:24.452
4	Jon Schofield; Matthew Robinson; Liam Heath; Lewis Fletcher	Great Britain	1:24.939
4	Deniss Volkovs; Roberts Akmens; Kaspars Tiklenieks; Aldis Arturs Vilde	Latvia	1:24.939
6	Martin Brzeziński; Rafał Rosolski; Dawid Putto; Norbert Kuczyński	Poland	1:25.382
7	Dejan Pajić; Simo Boltić; Ervin Holpert; Strahinja Stefanović	Serbia	1:26.519
8	Omar de Andrés; Pablo de Torres; Ezequiel Di Giacomo; Gonzalo Carreras	Argentina	1:26.846
9	Nicola Ripamonti; Alessandro Gnecchi; Andrea Schera; Edoardo Chierini	Italy	1:28.573

==== Final A ====
Competitors in this final raced for positions 1 to 9, with medals going to the top three.

Rank	Kayakers	Country	Time
1st place, gold medalist(s)	Max Rendschmidt; Tom Liebscher; Ronald Rauhe; Max Lemke	Germany	1:20.056
2nd place, silver medalist(s)	Saúl Craviotto; Marcus Walz; Cristian Toro; Rodrigo Germade	Spain	1:20.423
3rd place, bronze medalist(s)	Sándor Tótka; Péter Molnár; Miklós Dudás; István Kuli	Hungary	1:21.480
4	Riley Fitzsimmons; Thomas Green; Murray Stewart; Jordan Wood	Australia	1:21.780
5	Yury Postrigay; Oleg Gusev; Vitaly Ershov; Vasily Pogreban	Russia	1:22.006
6	Franck Le Moël; Guillaume Burger; Étienne Hubert; Guillaume Le Floch Decorchemont	France	1:22.530
7	Samuel Baláž; Csaba Zalka; Milan Fraňa; Tibor Linka	Slovakia	1:22.596
8	Jakub Zavřel; Josef Dostál; Radek Šlouf; Jan Štěrba	Czech Republic	1:23.050
9	Emanuel Silva; Messias Baptista; João Ribeiro; David Varela	Portugal	1:23.990
