= 2023 ICF Canoe Sprint World Championships – Men's K-1 200 metres =

Men's K-1 200 metres at the 2023 ICF Canoe Sprint World Championships
- Venue: Sportpark Duisburg
- Location: Duisburg, Germany
- Dates: 23–26 August
- Competitors: 45 from 45 nations
- Winning time: 35.243

Medalists
gold medal	Artūras Seja	Lithuania
silver medal	Badri Kavelashvili	Georgia
bronze medal	Carlos Garrote	Spain

The men's K-1 200 metres competition at the 2023 ICF Canoe Sprint World Championships in Duisburg took place in Sportpark Duisburg.

== Schedule ==
The schedule is as follows:

Date	Time	Round
Wednesday 23 August 2023	14:00	Heats
Thursday 24 August 2023	14:00	Semifinals
Saturday 26 August 2023	08:55	Final C
Saturday 26 August 2023	09:00	Final B
Saturday 26 August 2023	11:51	Final A

== Results ==
=== Heats ===
The fastest four boats in each heat, plus the fastest three remaining boats, advanced to the semifinal.

==== Heat 1 ====
Rank	Canoeist	Country	Time	Notes
1	Badri Kavelashvili	Georgia	35.635	QS
2	Martin Sobíšek	Czech Republic	36.353	QS
3	Brandon Wei Cheng Ooi	Singapore	37.163	QS
4	Ahmed Elbedwihy	Egypt	39.166	QS
5	Nicholas Robinson	Trinidad and Tobago	39.390	
6	Juan Arbeláez	Colombia	39.668	
	Ousmane Mbaye	Senegal	DNS	
	Ray Acuna	Venezuela	DNS	

==== Heat 2 ====
Rank	Canoeist	Country	Time	Notes
1	Roberts Akmens	Latvia	35.776	QS
2	Cho Gwang-hee	South Korea	35.820	QS
3	Jakub Michalski	Poland	36.492	QS
4	Ahmed Sameer Jumaah Faris	Iraq	36.949	QS
5	Erlan Sultangaziev	Kyrgyzstan	37.428	qS
6	Philip Majumdar	United States	37.597	
7	Achraf Elaidi	Morocco	45.872	
8	Pita Taufatofua	Tonga	52.925	

==== Heat 3 ====
Rank	Canoeist	Country	Time	Notes
1	Balázs Birkás	Hungary	35.752	QS
2	Petter Menning	Sweden	35.907	QS
3	Emircan Ayaklı	Turkey	37.594	QS
4	Ashton Reiser	New Zealand	38.136	QS
5	Eddy Barranco	Puerto Rico	39.901	
6	Amado Cruz	Belize	40.009	
7	Andre Tutaka-George	Cook Islands	41.910	
8	Joaquim Manhique	Mozambique	42.005	

==== Heat 4 ====
Rank	Canoeist	Country	Time	Notes
1	Kevin Santos	Portugal	36.016	QS
2	Denislav Tsvetanov	Bulgaria	36.175	QS
3	Oleksandr Zaitsev	Ukraine	36.635	QS
4	Fletcher Armstrong	Australia	37.157	QS
5	Gustav Bock	Denmark	37.162	qS
6	So Pak Yin	Hong Kong	38.720	
7	Vishnu Reghunath	India	39.306	
8	Jairo Domingos	Angola	42.153	

==== Heat 5 ====
Rank	Canoeist	Country	Time	Notes
1	Artūras Seja	Lithuania	35.965	QS
2	Nicholas Matveev	Canada	36.149	QS
3	Luka Stojkov	Serbia	36.693	QS
4	Joona Mäntynen	Finland	38.141	QS
5	Ryad Bentouati	Algeria	39.726	
6	Milan Gajdobranski	United Arab Emirates	40.305	
7	Nikola Maleski	North Macedonia	43.428	
8	Trevor Lespoir	Seychelles	44.719	

==== Heat 6 ====
Rank	Canoeist	Country	Time	Notes
1	Lewis Fletcher	Great Britain	35.338	QS
2	Carlos Garrote	Spain	35.623	QS
3	Jonas Dräger	Germany	35.904	QS
4	Edson Silva	Brazil	36.269	QS
5	Rok Šmit	Slovenia	37.369	qS
6	Henry van der Walt	South Africa	38.012	
7	Rafik Saputra	Indonesia	38.544	

=== Semifinal ===
The fastest three boats in each semi advanced to the A final. The next three fastest boats in each semi advanced to the final B. The remaining boats advanced to the C final.

==== Semifinal 1 ====
Rank	Canoeist	Country	Time	Notes
1	Carlos Garrote	Spain	34.186	QA
2	Badri Kavelashvili	Georgia	34.274	QA
3	Kevin Santos	Portugal	34.334	QA
4	Petter Menning	Sweden	34.646	QB
5	Luka Stojkov	Serbia	34.985	QB
6	Jakub Michalski	Poland	35.514	QB
7	Fletcher Armstrong	Australia	35.771	QC
8	Gustav Bock	Denmark	36.216	QC
9	Ahmed Elbedwihy	Egypt	38.535	QC

==== Semifinal 2 ====
Rank	Canoeist	Country	Time	Notes
1	Artūras Seja	Lithuania	34.467	QA
2	Denislav Tsvetanov	Bulgaria	34.575	QA
3	Roberts Akmens	Latvia	34.826	QA
4	Jonas Dräger	Germany	35.079	QB
5	Martin Sobíšek	Czech Republic	35.575	QB
6	Emircan Ayaklı	Turkey	36.323	QB
7	Rok Šmit	Slovenia	36.344	QC
8	Ahmed Sameer Jumaah Faris	Iraq	36.412	QC
9	Joona Mäntynen	Finland	36.812	QC

==== Semifinal 3 ====
Rank	Canoeist	Country	Time	Notes
1	Balázs Birkás	Hungary	34.720	QA
2	Cho Gwang-hee	South Korea	34.912	QA
3	Lewis Fletcher	Great Britain	34.955	QA
4	Nicholas Matveev	Canada	35.178	QB
5	Oleksandr Zaitsev	Ukraine	35.220	QB
6	Edson Silva	Brazil	35.418	QB
7	Erlan Sultangaziev	Kyrgyzstan	36.207	QC
8	Ashton Reiser	New Zealand	36.234	QC
9	Brandon Wei Cheng Ooi	Singapore	37.051	QC

=== Finals ===
==== Final C ====
Competitors in this final raced for positions 19 to 27.

Rank	Canoeist	Country	Time
1	Ashton Reiser	New Zealand	36.751
2	Fletcher Armstrong	Australia	37.040
3	Gustav Bock	Denmark	37.075
4	Erlan Sultangaziev	Kyrgyzstan	37.426
5	Joona Mäntynen	Finland	37.537
6	Rok Šmit	Slovenia	37.748
7	Ahmed Sameer Jumaah Faris	Iraq	37.763
8	Ahmed Elbedwihy	Egypt	40.498
	Brandon Wei Cheng Ooi	Singapore	DNS

=== Final B ===
Competitors in this final raced for positions 10 to 18.

Rank	Canoeist	Country	Time
1	Petter Menning	Sweden	35.232
2	Nicholas Matveev	Canada	35.360
3	Jonas Dräger	Germany	35.403
4	Oleksandr Zaitsev	Ukraine	35.619
5	Luka Stojkov	Serbia	35.696
6	Edson Silva	Brazil	35.997
7	Martin Sobíšek	Czech Republic	36.073
8	Jakub Michalski	Poland	36.339
9	Emircan Ayaklı	Turkey	36.490

=== Final A ===
Competitors raced for positions 1 to 9, with medals going to the top three.

Rank	Canoeist	Country	Time
1st place, gold medalist(s)	Artūras Seja	Lithuania	35.243
2nd place, silver medalist(s)	Badri Kavelashvili	Georgia	35.364
3rd place, bronze medalist(s)	Carlos Garrote	Spain	35.380
4	Kevin Santos	Portugal	35.565
5	Lewis Fletcher	Great Britain	35.674
6	Balázs Birkás	Hungary	35.735
7	Roberts Akmens	Latvia	36.119
8	Cho Gwang-hee	South Korea	36.154
9	Denislav Tsvetanov	Bulgaria	36.244
