= Canoeing at the 2020 Summer Olympics – Men's K-1 200 metres =

Olympic canoeing event

Men's K-1 200 metres at the Games of the XXXII Olympiad
- Canoeing pictogram
- Venue: Sea Forest Waterway
- Dates: 4 August 2021 (heats and quarterfinal); 5 August 2021 (semifinal & final)
- Competitors: 25 from 20 nations
- Winning time: 35.035

Medalists
1st place, gold medalist(s)		Sándor Tótka	Hungary
2nd place, silver medalist(s)		Manfredi Rizza	Italy
3rd place, bronze medalist(s)		Liam Heath	Great Britain

The men's K-1 200 metres sprint canoeing event at the 2020 Summer Olympics took place on 4 and 5 August 2021 at the Sea Forest Waterway. At least 12 canoeists from at least 12 nations competed.

== Background ==
This was the 3rd appearance of the event, which replaced the men's K-1 500 metres in 2012.

The 2016 Olympic champion and reigning World Champion is Liam Heath of Great Britain, who earned a place for his NOC and has been selected to compete.

== Qualification ==
A National Olympic Committee (NOC) only qualify 1 boat in the event, but could enter up to 2 boats if it had enough men's kayak quota place through other events. A total of 12 qualification places were available, initially allocated as follows:

- 5 places awarded through the 2019 ICF Canoe Sprint World Championships
- 6 places awarded through continental tournaments, 1 per continent except 2 places for Europe
- 1 place awarded through the 2021 Canoe Sprint World Cup Stage 2.

Qualifying places were awarded to the NOC, not to the individual canoeist who earned the place.

Spain had to decline a quota place due to exceeding the total limit of 6 men's kayak places per nation (after qualifying in the K-4 and K-2 as well). This made a total of 5 World Championship places that were awarded as follows:

Rank	Kayaker	Nation	Qualification	Selected competitor
1	Liam Heath	Great Britain	Quota #1 in K-1 200 m	
2	Strahinja Stefanović	Serbia	Quota #2 in K-1 200 m	
3	Carlos Garrote	Spain	6 places from K-4 and K-2	Could enter via K-1 500, K-2, or K-4
4	Maxime Beaumont	France	Quota #3 in K-1 200 m	
5	Manfredi Rizza	Italy	Quota #4 in K-1 200 m	
6	Petter Menning	Sweden	Quota #5 in K-1 200 m	

The Americas continental tournament was cancelled; that place was allocated through the World Championships, with the place going to Argentina. Egypt earned Africa's place (after South Africa declined), South Korea took Asia's, ROC and Latvia earned Europe's two places, and Samoa took Oceania's. Lithuania earned the final spot at the World Cup.

Nation	Qualification	Selected competitor
Egypt	Africa quota in K-1 200 m	
Argentina	Americas quota in K-1 200 m	
South Korea	Asia quota in K-1 200 m	
ROC	Europe quota #1 in K-1 200 m	
Latvia	Europe quota #2 in K-1 200 m	
Samoa	Oceania quota in K-1 200 m	
Lithuania	World Cup quota in K-1 200 m	

Nations with men's kayak quota spots from the K-1 1000 metres, K-2 1000 metres, or K-4 500 metres could enter (additional) boats as well.

Nation	Selected competitor 1	Selected competitor 2
Spain	Carlos Arévalo (K-4)	Saúl Craviotto (K-4)

== Competition format ==
Sprint canoeing uses a four-round format for events with at least 11 boats, with heats, quarterfinals, semifinals, and finals. The details for each round depend on how many boats ultimately enter.

The course is a flatwater course 9 metres wide. The name of the event describes the particular format within sprint canoeing. The "K" format means a kayak, with the canoeist sitting, using a double-bladed paddle to paddle, and steering with a foot-operated rudder (as opposed to a canoe, with a kneeling canoeist, single-bladed paddle, and no rudder). The "1" is the number of canoeists in each boat. The "200 metres" is the distance of each race.

== Schedule ==
The event was held over two consecutive days, with two rounds per day. All sessions started at 9:30 a.m. local time, though there are multiple events with races in each session.

Legend
H	Heats	¼	Quarter-finals	½	Semi-finals	F	Final

Sprint
Event↓/Date →	Mon 2	Tue 3	Wed 4		Thu 5		Fri 6	Sat 7
Men's K-1 200 m			H	¼	½	F		

== Results ==
=== Heats ===
Progression System: 1st-2nd to SF, rest to QF.

==== Heat 1 ====
Rank	Lane	Canoer	Country	Time	Notes
1	5	Petter Menning	Sweden	34.698	SF
2	4	Saúl Craviotto	Spain	35.002	SF
3	3	Evgenii Lukantsov	ROC	35.157	QF
4	2	Kohl Horton	Cook Islands	40.061	QF
5	6	Rudolf Williams	Samoa	42.083	QF

==== Heat 2 ====
Rank	Lane	Canoer	Country	Time	Notes
1	3	Kolos Csizmadia	Hungary	34.442	SF
2	4	Carlos Arévalo	Spain	34.452	SF
3	5	Liam Heath	Great Britain	34.582	QF
4	6	Nicholas Matveev	Canada	36.190	QF
5	2	Momen Mahran	Egypt	38.850	QF

==== Heat 3 ====
Rank	Lane	Canoer	Country	Time	Notes
1	4	Sándor Tótka	Hungary	35.070	SF
2	5	Roberts Akmens	Latvia	35.448	SF
3	3	Cho Gwang-hee	South Korea	35.738	QF
4	2	Mark de Jonge	Canada	36.110	QF
5	6	Momotaro Matsushita	Japan	36.110	QF

==== Heat 4 ====
Rank	Lane	Canoer	Country	Time	Notes
1	5	Manfredi Rizza	Italy	34.867	SF
2	4	Maxime Beaumont	France	35.259	SF
3	2	Oleg Gusev	ROC	35.928	QF
4	3	Yang Xiaoxu	China	36.561	QF
5	6	Bojan Zdelar	Serbia	37.092	QF

==== Heat 5 ====
Rank	Lane	Canoer	Country	Time	Notes
1	4	Strahinja Stefanović	Serbia	34.996	SF
2	3	Rubén Rézola	Argentina	35.059	SF
3	5	Mindaugas Maldonis	Lithuania	35.650	QF
4	2	Tuva'a Clifton	Samoa	38.363	QF
5	6	Amado Cruz	Belize	39.645	QF

=== Quarterfinals ===
Progression System: 1st-2nd to SF, rest out.

==== Quarterfinal 1 ====
Rank	Lane	Canoer	Country	Time	Notes
1	5	Mindaugas Maldonis	Lithuania	35.466	SF
2	2	Momotaro Matsushita	Japan	35.540	SF
3	4	Yang Xiaoxu	China	35.852	
4	6	Momen Mahran	Egypt	37.836	
	3	Kohl Horton	Cook Islands	DNF	

==== Quarterfinal 2 ====
Rank	Lane	Canoer	Country	Time	Notes
1	5	Liam Heath	Great Britain	33.985	OB, SF
2	4	Evgenii Lukantsov	ROC	35.184	SF
3	3	Mark de Jonge	Canada	35.462	
4	7	Bojan Zdelar	Serbia	36.531	
5	6	Rudolf Williams	Samoa	41.950	

==== Quarterfinal 3 ====
Rank	Lane	Canoer	Country	Time	Notes
1	5	Cho Gwang-hee	South Korea	35.048	SF
2	6	Nicholas Matveev	Canada	35.181	SF
3	4	Oleg Gusev	ROC	35.581	
4	3	Tuva'a Clifton	Samoa	38.287	
5	7	Amado Cruz	Belize	39.333	

=== Semifinals ===
Progression System: 1st-4th to Final A, rest to Final B.

==== Semifinal 1 ====
Rank	Lane	Canoer	Country	Time	Notes
1	5	Kolos Csizmadia	Hungary	35.099	FA
2	7	Liam Heath	Great Britain	35.108	FA
3	4	Petter Menning	Sweden	35.149	FA
4	2	Roberts Akmens	Latvia	35.688	FA
5	3	Strahinja Stefanović	Serbia	35.855	FB
6	6	Maxime Beaumont	France	36.072	FB
7	8	Nicholas Matveev	Canada	36.584	FB
8	1	Momotaro Matsushita	Japan	37.096	FB

==== Semifinal 2 ====
Rank	Lane	Canoer	Country	Time	Notes
1	5	Sándor Tótka	Hungary	35.114	FA
2	4	Manfredi Rizza	Italy	35.171	FA
3	6	Carlos Arévalo	Spain	35.207	FA
4	3	Saúl Craviotto	Spain	35.934	FA
5	8	Evgenii Lukantsov	ROC	36.036	FB
6	1	Cho Gwang-hee	South Korea	36.094	FB
7	2	Rubén Rézola	Argentina	36.552	FB
8	7	Mindaugas Maldonis	Lithuania	36.637	FB

=== Finals ===
==== Final A ====
Rank	Lane	Canoer	Country	Time	Notes
1st place, gold medalist(s)	4	Sándor Tótka	Hungary	35.035	
2nd place, silver medalist(s)	6	Manfredi Rizza	Italy	35.080	
3rd place, bronze medalist(s)	3	Liam Heath	Great Britain	35.202	
4	5	Kolos Csizmadia	Hungary	35.317	
5	2	Carlos Arévalo	Spain	35.391	
6	7	Petter Menning	Sweden	35.562	
7	8	Saúl Craviotto	Spain	35.568	
8	1	Roberts Akmens	Latvia	36.014	

==== Final B ====
Rank	Lane	Canoer	Country	Time	Notes
9	3	Maxime Beaumont	France	35.998	
10	8	Mindaugas Maldonis	Lithuania	36.257	
11	5	Strahinja Stefanović	Serbia	36.329	
12	4	Evgenii Lukantsov	ROC	36.369	
13	6	Cho Gwang-hee	South Korea	36.440	
14	7	Nicholas Matveev	Canada	36.625	
15	2	Rubén Rézola	Argentina	36.775	
16	1	Momotaro Matsushita	Japan	37.250	
