= 2021 ICF Canoe Sprint World Championships – Men's K-1 200 metres =

Men's K-1 200 metres at the 2021 ICF Canoe Sprint World Championships
- Venue: Lake Bagsværd
- Location: Copenhagen, Denmark
- Dates: 17–19 September
- Competitors: 28 from 28 nations
- Winning time: 34.78

Medalists
gold medal	Andrea Di Liberto	Italy
silver medal	Petter Menning	Sweden
bronze medal	Roberts Akmens	Latvia

The men's K-1 200 metres competition at the 2021 ICF Canoe Sprint World Championships in Copenhagen took place on Lake Bagsværd.

== Schedule ==
The schedule was as follows:

Date	Time	Round
Friday 17 September 2021	09:10	Heats
Friday 17 September 2021	16:00	Semifinals
Sunday 19 September 2021	10:52	Final B
Sunday 19 September 2021	11:11	Final A

All times are Central European Summer Time (UTC+2)

== Results ==
=== Heats ===
The six fastest boats in each heat, plus the three fastest remaining boats advanced to the semifinals.

==== Heat 1 ====
Rank	Kayaker	Country	Time	Notes
1	Petter Menning	Sweden	36.68	QS
2	Jakub Stepun	Poland	36.82	QS
3	Kevin Santos	Portugal	37.96	QS
4	Pierre-Luc Poulin	Canada	38.17	QS
5	Martin Sobisek	Czech Republic	38.34	QS
6	Stav Mizrahi	Israel	38.57	QS
7	Brandon Ooi	Singapore	38.74	qS
8	Magnus Sibbersen	Denmark	38.80	

==== Heat 2 ====
Rank	Kayaker	Country	Time	Notes
1	Roberts Akmens	Latvia	36.95	QS
2	Aliaksei Misiuchenka	Belarus	37.32	QS
3	Noah Dembele	Great Britain	37.83	QS
4	Chrisjan Coetzee	South Africa	38.35	QS
5	Denislav Tsvetanov	Bulgaria	38.38	QS
6	Carlos Garrote	Spain	38.45	QS
7	Ioannis Odysseos	Cyprus	38.85	qS

==== Heat 3 ====
Rank	Kayaker	Country	Time	Notes
1	Artūras Seja	Lithuania	36.87	QS
2	Alexander Dyachenko	RCF	37.05	QS
3	Jonas Dräger	Germany	37.58	QS
4	Jérémy Leray	France	37.90	QS
5	Christos Matsas	Greece	40.32	QS
–	Vitalii Tsurkan	Ukraine	DNS	

==== Heat 4 ====
Rank	Kayaker	Country	Time	Notes
1	Andrea Di Liberto	Italy	36.68	QS
2	Kolos Csizmadia	Hungary	37.03	QS
3	Strahinja Stefanović	Serbia	37.34	QS
4	Badri Kavelashvili	Georgia	37.57	QS
5	Taris Harker	New Zealand	38.40	QS
6	Harald Ivarsen	Norway	38.96	QS
7	Nicholas Robinson	Trinidad and Tobago	43.11	qS

=== Semifinals ===
Qualification in each semi was as follows:

The fastest three boats advanced to the A final.
The next three fastest boats advanced to the B final.

==== Semifinal 1 ====
Rank	Kayaker	Country	Time	Notes
1	Petter Menning	Sweden	37.03	QA
2	Strahinja Stefanović	Serbia	37.40	QA
3	Aliaksei Misiuchenka	Belarus	37.48	QA
4	Carlos Garrote	Spain	37.54	QB
5	Badri Kavelashvili	Georgia	37.65	QB
6	Alexander Dyachenko	RCF	37.79	QB
7	Martin Sobisek	Czech Republic	38.36	
8	Brandon Ooi	Singapore	39.16	
9	Christos Matsas	Greece	40.01	

==== Semifinal 2 ====
Rank	Kayaker	Country	Time	Notes
1	Kolos Csizmadia	Hungary	35.49	QA
2	Roberts Akmens	Latvia	35.70	QA
3	Kevin Santos	Portugal	36.37	QA
4	Jérémy Leray	France	36.46	QB
5	Jonas Dräger	Germany	36.65	QB
6	Pierre-Luc Poulin	Canada	37.08	QB
7	Denislav Tsvetanov	Bulgaria	37.37	
8	Harald Ivarsen	Norway	37.77	
9	Ioannis Odysseos	Cyprus	37.91	

==== Semifinal 3 ====
Rank	Kayaker	Country	Time	Notes
1	Andrea Di Liberto	Italy	36.83	QA
2	Artūras Seja	Lithuania	37.19	QA
3	Jakub Stepun	Poland	37.51	QA
4	Chrisjan Coetzee	South Africa	38.46	QB
5	Taris Harker	New Zealand	38.49	QB
6	Noah Dembele	Great Britain	38.79	QB
7	Stav Mizrahi	Israel	39.34	
8	Nicholas Robinson	Trinidad and Tobago	42.91	

=== Finals ===
==== Final B ====
Competitors in this final raced for positions 10 to 18.

Rank	Kayaker	Country	Time
1	Carlos Garrote	Spain	35.66
2	Badri Kavelashvili	Georgia	35.76
3	Alexander Dyachenko	RCF	35.78
4	Jérémy Leray	France	35.97
5	Noah Dembele	Great Britain	36.29
6	Jonas Dräger	Germany	36.48
7	Pierre-Luc Poulin	Canada	36.51
8	Taris Harker	New Zealand	36.68
9	Chrisjan Coetzee	South Africa	36.95

==== Final A ====
Competitors in this final raced for positions 1 to 9, with medals going to the top three.

Rank	Kayaker	Country	Time
1st place, gold medalist(s)	Andrea Di Liberto	Italy	34.78
2nd place, silver medalist(s)	Petter Menning	Sweden	34.81
3rd place, bronze medalist(s)	Roberts Akmens	Latvia	34.95
4	Jakub Stepun	Poland	35.06
5	Kolos Csizmadia	Hungary	35.19
5	Aliaksei Misiuchenka	Belarus	35.19
7	Strahinja Stefanović	Serbia	35.20
8	Artūras Seja	Lithuania	35.31
9	Kevin Santos	Portugal	36.44
