= Canoe sprint at the 2015 European Games – Men's K-1 200 metres =

Men's K-1 200 metres at the 2015 European Games
- Venue: Kur Sport and Rowing Centre, Mingachevir
- Date: 15–16 June
- Competitors: 27 from 27 nations
- Winning time: 35.576

Medalists
gold medal	Petter Menning	Sweden
silver medal	Ed McKeever	Great Britain
bronze medal	Aleksejs Rumjancevs	Latvia
bronze medal	Marko Dragosavljević	Serbia

The men's K-1 200 metres canoe sprint competition at the 2015 European Games in Baku took place between 15 and 16 June at the Kur Sport and Rowing Centre in Mingachevir.

== Schedule ==
The schedule was as follows:

Date	Time	Round
Monday 15 June 2015	15:05	Heats
Monday 15 June 2015	16:45	Semifinals
Tuesday 16 June 2015	15:10	Finals

All times are Azerbaijan Summer Time (UTC+5)

== Results ==
=== Heats ===
Heat winners advanced directly to the A final. The next six fastest boats in each heat advanced to the semifinals.

==== Heat 1 ====
Rank	Kayaker	Country	Time	Notes
1	Ed McKeever	Great Britain	34.984	QA, GB
2	Miklós Dudás	Hungary	35.218	QS
3	Marko Dragosavljević	Serbia	35.309	QS
4	Denis Ambroziak	Poland	35.569	QS
5	Saúl Craviotto	Spain	35.628	QS
6	Daniel Burciu	Romania	36.222	QS
7	Mustafa Gülbahar	Turkey	36.916	QS
8	Miroslav Kirchev	Bulgaria	37.802	
9	Antun Novaković	Croatia	38.674	

==== Heat 2 ====
Rank	Kayaker	Country	Time	Notes
1	Petter Menning	Sweden	34.822	QA, GB
2	Aleksejs Rumjancevs	Latvia	34.857	QS
3	Evgenii Lukantsov	Russia	35.515	QS
4	Taras Valko	Belarus	36.300	QS
5	Diogo Lopes	Portugal	36.441	QS
6	Tom Brennan	Ireland	36.446	QS
7	Aleksandr Senkevych	Ukraine	36.774	QS
8	Andreas Diamantis	Cyprus	38.166	
–	Nicola Ripamonti	Italy	DNS	

==== Heat 3 ====
Rank	Kayaker	Country	Time	Notes
1	Ignas Navakauskas	Lithuania	35.022	QA
2	Filip Šváb	Czech Republic	35.601	QS
3	Arnaud Hybois	France	35.731	QS
4	Jonathan Delombaerde	Belgium	35.891	QS
5	Max Lemke	Germany	36.079	QS
6	Miroslav Zaťko	Slovakia	36.282	QS
7	Mirnazim Javadov	Azerbaijan	36.298	QS
8	Stylianos Chatzopoulos	Greece	37.057	
9	Badri Kavelashvili	Georgia	37.284	

=== Semifinals ===
The fastest three boats in each semi advanced to the A final. The next four fastest boats in each semi, plus the fastest remaining boat advanced to the B final.

==== Semifinal 1 ====
Rank	Kayaker	Country	Time	Notes
1	Miklós Dudás	Hungary	34.568	QA, GB
2	Jonathan Delombaerde	Belgium	34.997	QA
3	Evgenii Lukantsov	Russia	35.108	QA
4	Denis Ambroziak	Poland	35.143	QB
5	Arnaud Hybois	France	35.157	QB
6	Aleksandr Senkevych	Ukraine	35.720	QB
7	Miroslav Zaťko	Slovakia	35.808	QB
8	Daniel Burciu	Romania	36.042	qB
9	Diogo Lopes	Portugal	36.443	

==== Semifinal 2 ====
Rank	Kayaker	Country	Time	Notes
1	Marko Dragosavljević	Serbia	34.881	QA
2	Aleksejs Rumjancevs	Latvia	34.976	QA
3	Filip Šváb	Czech Republic	35.179	QA
4	Saúl Craviotto	Spain	35.235	QB
5	Max Lemke	Germany	35.335	QB
6	Mustafa Gülbahar	Turkey	35.969	QB
7	Mirnazim Javadov	Azerbaijan	36.104	QB
8	Tom Brennan	Ireland	36.191	
9	Taras Valko	Belarus	44.591	

=== Finals ===
==== Final B ====
Competitors in this final raced for positions 10 to 18.

Rank	Kayaker	Country	Time
1	Denis Ambroziak	Poland	36.526
2	Saúl Craviotto	Spain	36.747
3	Arnaud Hybois	France	36.835
4	Max Lemke	Germany	37.075
5	Mustafa Gülbahar	Turkey	37.204
6	Aleksandr Senkevych	Ukraine	37.329
7	Mirnazim Javadov	Azerbaijan	37.492
8	Miroslav Zaťko	Slovakia	37.700
9	Daniel Burciu	Romania	38.584

==== Final A ====
Competitors in this final raced for positions 1 to 9, with medals going to the top three.

Rank	Kayaker	Country	Time
1st place, gold medalist(s)	Petter Menning	Sweden	35.576
2nd place, silver medalist(s)	Ed McKeever	Great Britain	35.774
3rd place, bronze medalist(s)	Aleksejs Rumjancevs	Latvia	35.842
3rd place, bronze medalist(s)	Marko Dragosavljević	Serbia	35.842
5	Ignas Navakauskas	Lithuania	35.851
6	Evgenii Lukantsov	Russia	36.310
7	Filip Šváb	Czech Republic	36.757
8	Jonathan Delombaerde	Belgium	36.850
–	Miklós Dudás	Hungary	DSQ (Note: Miklós Dudás, who originally finished in first place, was disqualified after he tested positive for a banned substance.); ~~35.132~~
