= Canoe sprint at the 2023 European Games – Men's K-1 200 metres =

Men's K-1 200 metres at the 2023 European Games
- Venue: Kryspinów Waterway
- Date: 22–23 June
- Competitors: 18 from 18 nations
- Winning time: 36.845

Medalists
| gold medal | Messias Baptista | Portugal |
| silver medal | Petter Menning | Sweden |
| bronze medal | Roberts Akmens | Latvia |

The men's K-1 200 metres canoe sprint competition at the 2023 European Games took place on 23 and 24 June at the Kryspinów Waterway.

== Schedule ==
All times are local (UTC+2).

| Date | Time | Round |
|---|---|---|
| Thursday, 22 June 2023 | 9:35 | Heats |
| Thursday, 22 June 2023 | 16:21 | Semifinal |
| Friday, 23 June 2023 | 15:31 | Final |

== Results ==
=== Heats ===
==== Heat 1 ====
| Rank | Kayaker | Country | Time | Notes |
|---|---|---|---|---|
| 1 | Marko Dragosavljević | Serbia | 34.494 | QF, GB |
| 2 | Messias Baptista | Portugal | 34.622 | QF |
| 3 | Andrea Di Liberto | Italy | 34.632 | QF |
| 4 | Badri Kavelashvili | Georgia | 34.966 | QS |
| 5 | Carlos Garrote | Spain | 35.080 | QS |
| 6 | Stav Mizrahi | Israel | 35.964 | QS |
| 7 | Joona Mäntynen | Finland | 36.570 | QS |
| 8 | Emircan Ayaklı | Turkey | 37.000 | |
| 9 | Nikola Maleski | North Macedonia | 41.809 | |

==== Heat 2 ====
| Rank | Kayaker | Country | Time | Notes |
|---|---|---|---|---|
| 1 | Roberts Akmens | Latvia | 34.707 | QF |
| 2 | Petter Menning | Sweden | 34.763 | QF |
| 3 | Anže Urankar | Slovenia | 34.979 | QF |
| 4 | Oleksandr Zaitsev | Ukraine | 35.107 | QS |
| 5 | Gunnar Eide | Norway | 35.123 | QS |
| 6 | Max Lemke | Germany | 35.343 | QS |
| 7 | Ádám Varga | Hungary | 35.579 | QS |
| 8 | Jakub Zavřel | Czech Republic | 36.159 | qS |
| 9 | Christos Matsas | Greece | 37.259 | |

=== Semifinal ===
| Rank | Kayaker | Country | Time | Notes |
|---|---|---|---|---|
| 1 | Oleksandr Zaitsev | Ukraine | 35.809 | QF |
| 2 | Badri Kavelashvili | Georgia | 35.839 | QF |
| 3 | Gunnar Eide | Norway | 35.889 | QF |
| 4 | Carlos Garrote | Spain | 36.141 | |
| 5 | Max Lemke | Germany | 36.209 | |
| 6 | Ádám Varga | Hungary | 36.275 | |
| 7 | Stav Mizrahi | Israel | 36.741 | |
| 8 | Jakub Zavřel | Czech Republic | 37.311 | |
| 9 | Joona Mäntynen | Finland | 37.741 | |

=== Final ===
| Rank | Kayaker | Country | Time |
|---|---|---|---|
| 1st place, gold medalist(s) | Messias Baptista | Portugal | 36.845 |
| 2nd place, silver medalist(s) | Petter Menning | Sweden | 37.179 |
| 3rd place, bronze medalist(s) | Roberts Akmens | Latvia | 37.189 |
| 4 | Marko Dragosavljević | Serbia | 37.209 |
| 5 | Anže Urankar | Slovenia | 37.335 |
| 6 | Andrea Di Liberto | Italy | 37.363 |
| 7 | Oleksandr Zaitsev | Ukraine | 37.535 |
| 8 | Badri Kavelashvili | Georgia | 37.653 |
| 9 | Gunnar Eide | Norway | 38.075 |
