= Canoeing at the 2016 Summer Olympics – Men's K-1 200 metres =

Men's canoe sprint K-1 200 metres at the Games of the XXXI Olympiad
- Venue: Lagoa Stadium
- Date: 19–20 August 2016
- Competitors: 22 from 22 nations
- Winning time: 35.197

Medalists
1st place, gold medalist(s)		Liam Heath	Great Britain
2nd place, silver medalist(s)		Maxime Beaumont	France
3rd place, bronze medalist(s)		Saúl Craviotto	Spain
3rd place, bronze medalist(s)		Ronald Rauhe	Germany

The men's canoe sprint K-1 200 metres at the 2016 Olympic Games in Rio de Janeiro took place between 19 and 20 August at Lagoa Stadium. The medals were presented by José Perurena López, IOC member, Spain and Frank Garner, Board Member of the ICF.

== Competition format ==
The competition comprised heats, semifinals, and a final round. The leading five in each heat plus the fastest sixth place advanced to the semifinals. The top four from the semifinals advanced to the "A" final, and competed for medals. The other semifinalists advanced to the "B" final.

== Schedule ==
All times are Brasilia Time (UTC-03:00)

Date	Time	Round
Friday, 19 August 2016	9:00; 10:07	Heats; Semifinals
Saturday, 20 August 2016	9:00	Finals

== Results ==
=== Heats ===
==== Heat 1 ====
Rank	Canoer	Country	Time	Notes
1	Ronald Rauhe	Germany	34.350	SF
2	Manfredi Rizza	Italy	34.726	SF
3	Mark de Jonge	Canada	34.898	SF
4	Aleksejs Rumjancevs	Latvia	35.175	SF
5	César de Cesare	Ecuador	35.216	SF
6	Paweł Kaczmarek	Poland	35.562	
7	Edson Silva	Brazil	35.665	
8	Alexey Dergunov	Kazakhstan	36.647	

==== Heat 2 ====
Rank	Canoer	Country	Time	Notes
1	Maxime Beaumont	France	34.322	SF
2	Saúl Craviotto	Spain	34.694	SF
3	Péter Molnár	Hungary	35.102	SF
4	Evgenii Lukantsov	Russia	35.245	SF
5	Cho Kwang-hee	South Korea	35.402	SF
6	Fidel Antonio Vargas	Cuba	35.561	
7	Filip Šváb	Czech Republic	35.567	

==== Heat 3 ====
Rank	Canoer	Country	Time	Notes
1	Liam Heath	Great Britain	34.327	SF
2	Stephen Bird	Australia	34.650	SF
3	Marko Novaković	Serbia	34.938	SF
4	Ignas Navakauskas	Lithuania	35.144	SF
5	Petter Menning	Sweden	35.264	SF
6	Rubén Voisard	Argentina	35.491	SF
7	Karim Elsayed	Egypt	37.294	

=== Semifinals ===
==== Semifinal 1 ====
Rank	Canoer	Country	Time	Notes
1	Liam Heath	Great Britain	34.076	FA
2	Ronald Rauhe	Germany	34.180	FA
3	Saúl Craviotto	Spain	34.545	FA
4	Mark de Jonge	Canada	34.775	FA
5	Marko Novaković	Serbia	34.778	FB
6	Petter Menning	Sweden	35.562	FB
7	Evgenii Lukantsov	Russia	35.567	FB
8	César de Cesare	Ecuador	35.936	FB

==== Semifinal 2 ====
Rank	Canoer	Country	Time	Notes
1	Maxime Beaumont	France	34.398	FA
2	Stephen Bird	Australia	34.584	FA
3	Manfredi Rizza	Italy	34.686	FA
4	Aleksejs Rumjancevs	Latvia	34.722	FA
5	Ignas Navakauskas	Lithuania	35.168	FB
6	Péter Molnár	Hungary	35.207	FB
7	Rubén Voisard	Argentina	35.439	FB
8	Cho Kwang-hee	South Korea	35.869	FB

=== Finals ===
==== Final B ====
Rank	Canoer	Country	Time
9	Ignas Navakauskas	Lithuania	37.075
10	Petter Menning	Sweden	37.104
11	César de Cesare	Ecuador	37.169
12	Cho Kwang-hee	South Korea	37.265
13	Marko Novaković	Serbia	37.415
14	Evgenii Lukantsov	Russia	37.482
15	Péter Molnár	Hungary	37.896
16	Rubén Voisard	Argentina	38.061

==== Final A ====
Rank	Canoer	Country	Time
1st place, gold medalist(s)	Liam Heath	Great Britain	35.197
2nd place, silver medalist(s)	Maxime Beaumont	France	35.362
3rd place, bronze medalist(s)	Saúl Craviotto	Spain	35.662
3rd place, bronze medalist(s)	Ronald Rauhe	Germany	35.662
5	Aleksejs Rumjancevs	Latvia	35.891
6	Manfredi Rizza	Italy	36.000
7	Mark de Jonge	Canada	36.080
8	Stephen Bird	Australia	36.426
