= Canoeing at the 2018 Asian Games – Men's K-1 200 metres =

Men's K-1 200 metres at the 2018 Asian Games
- Venue: Jakabaring Lake
- Date: 31 August – 1 September 2018
- Competitors: 15 from 15 nations

Medalists
gold medal	Cho Gwang-hee	South Korea
silver medal	Sergii Tokarnytskyi	Kazakhstan
bronze medal	Mervyn Toh	Singapore

The men's sprint K-1 (kayak single) 200 metres competition at the 2018 Asian Games was held from 31 August to 1 September 2018.

== Schedule ==
All times are Western Indonesia Time (UTC+07:00)

Date	Time	Event
Friday, 31 August 2018	09:40	Heats
Friday, 31 August 2018	16:20	Semifinal
Saturday, 1 September 2018	08:50	Final

== Results ==
=== Heats ===
- Qualification: 1–3 → Final (QF), Rest → Semifinal (QS)

==== Heat 1 ====
Rank	Athlete	Time	Notes
1	Sergii Tokarnytskyi (KAZ)	36.219	QF
2	Cho Gwang-hee (KOR)	36.249	QF
3	Ruslan Moltaev (KGZ)	37.419	QF
4	Ahmed Sameer (IRQ)	38.865	QS
5	Sutrisno (INA)	39.193	QS
6	Kwok Ka Wai (HKG)	41.050	QS
7	L. Naocha Singh (IND)	41.151	QS
8	Ly Torhieth (CAM)	41.349	QS

==== Heat 2 ====
Rank	Athlete	Time	Notes
1	Mervyn Toh (SGP)	37.599	QF
2	Momotaro Matsushita (JPN)	38.079	QF
3	Praison Buasamrong (THA)	38.123	QF
4	Ali Aghamirzaei (IRI)	38.210	QS
5	Abdusattor Gafurov (TJK)	42.301	QS
6	Ranhoti Wijerathna (SRI)	45.121	QS
7	Lao Hou Kit (MAC)	48.047	QS

=== Semifinal ===
- Qualification: 1–3 → Final (QF)

Rank	Athlete	Time	Notes
1	Ahmed Sameer (IRQ)	36.740	QF
2	Ali Aghamirzaei (IRI)	36.838	QF
3	Sutrisno (INA)	37.558	QF
4	Kwok Ka Wai (HKG)	38.499	
5	Ly Torhieth (CAM)	39.274	
6	Abdusattor Gafurov (TJK)	39.563	
7	L. Naocha Singh (IND)	39.716	
8	Ranhoti Wijerathna (SRI)	41.821	
9	Lao Hou Kit (MAC)	44.168	

=== Final ===
Rank	Athlete	Time
1st place, gold medalist(s)	Cho Gwang-hee (KOR)	35.373
2nd place, silver medalist(s)	Sergii Tokarnytskyi (KAZ)	35.745
3rd place, bronze medalist(s)	Mervyn Toh (SGP)	36.314
4	Praison Buasamrong (THA)	36.909
5	Ruslan Moltaev (KGZ)	36.932
6	Ali Aghamirzaei (IRI)	36.960
7	Momotaro Matsushita (JPN)	37.163
8	Ahmed Sameer (IRQ)	37.380
9	Sutrisno (INA)	38.628
