= Bence Horváth =

Bence Horváth may refer to:

- Bence Horváth (footballer)
- Bence Horváth (canoeist)
