= Momen Mahran =

Egyptian canoeist

Personal information
- Nationality: Egyptian
- Born: 20 August 1996 (age 29)

Sport
- Sport: Canoe sprint

Momen Mahran (born 20 August 1996) is an Egyptian canoeist. He competed in the men's K-1 200 metres event at the 2020 Summer Olympics.
