= Miklós Dudás (canoeist) =

Hungarian canoeist (1991–2026)

Personal information
- Nationality: Hungarian
- Born: 16 April 1991 Budapest, Hungary
- Died: 5 January 2026 (aged 34) Budapest, Hungary

Sport
- Country: Hungary
- Sport: Canoe sprint
- Event: Kayaking
Medal record
Men's canoe sprint
Representing Hungary
World Championships
Gold medal – first place	2014 Moscow	K-1 4×200 m
Bronze medal – third place	2013 Duisburg	K-1 4×200 m
Bronze medal – third place	2018 Montemor-o-Velho	K-4 500 m
European Championships
Silver medal – second place	2013 Montemor-o-Velho	K-1 500 m
Bronze medal – third place	2018 Belgrade	K-4 500 m
European Games
Disqualified	2015 Baku	K-1 200 m

Miklós Dudás (16 April 1991 – 5 January 2026) was a Hungarian sprint canoeist. At the 2012 Summer Olympics, he competed in the Men's K-1 200 metres.

In 2015, Dudás won a gold medal in the K-1 200 metres event at the 2015 European Games. He subsequently tested positive for a banned substance and he was disqualified from the event.

On 5 January 2026, he was found dead at his home in Budapest. He was 34.

== Honours ==
- Cross of Merit of Hungary – Bronze Cross (2012)
