= Yang Xiaoxu =

Chinese canoeist

Personal information
- Nationality: Chinese
- Born: 20 October 1996 (age 28); Chengde, China

Sport
- Sport: Canoe sprint

Yang Xiaoxu (born 20 October 1996) is a Chinese canoeist. He competed in the men's K-1 200 metres event at the 2020 Summer Olympics.
