= Karim Elsayed =

Egyptian canoeist

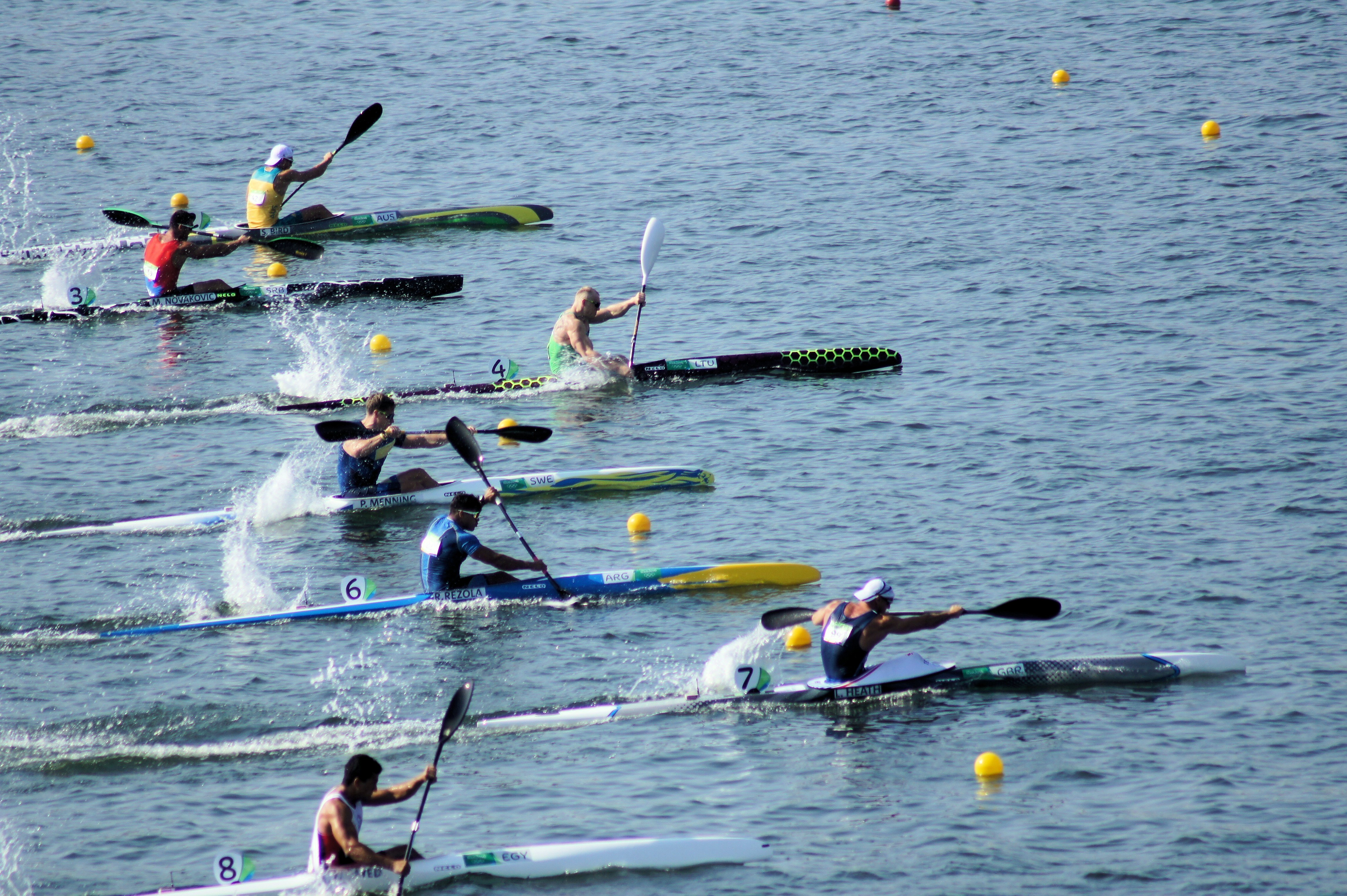
- Karim Elsayed (No. 8, nearest canoeist) at the Rio Olympics Men's K1 200m heat

Personal information
- Born: 16 February 1995 (age 31)

Sport
- Sport: Canoe sprint

Karim Elsayed (born 16 February 1995) is an Egyptian canoeist. He competed in the men's K-1 200 metres event at the 2016 Summer Olympics.
