= Simo Boltić =

Serbian sprint canoer (born 1994)

Medal record

Men's canoe sprint

Representing Serbia

European Championships
Silver medal – second place	2013 Montemor-o-Velho	K-2 500 m

World U23 Championships
Silver medal – second place	2014 Szeged	K-2 1000 m

European U23 Championships
Silver medal – second place	2015 Bascov	K-2 500 m
Silver medal – second place	2016 Plovdiv	K-2 1000 m
Bronze medal – third place	2017 Belgrade	K-2 500 m

European Junior Championships
Gold medal – first place	2012 Montemor o'Velho	K-2 500 m

Simo Boltić (Serbian Cyrillic: Симо Болтић, born 29 November 1994 in Bačka Palanka) is a Serbian sprint canoer. He won a silver medal at Canoe Sprint European Championships, in K-2 500 m, with Marko Dragosavljević.

When he was junior, he won one medal at the European Junior Championships, gold in K-2 500 m, with Marko Dragosavljević,

Simo is a member of the Sintelon canoe club in Bačka Palanka.
