= Dzmitry Tratsiakou =

Belarusian canoeist

Personal information
- Nationality: Belarusian
- Born: 25 September 1993 (age 32)
- Height: 1.83 m (6 ft 0 in)
- Weight: 85 kg (187 lb)

Sport
- Country: Belarus
- Sport: Sprint kayak
- Event: K-1 200 m
Medal record
Men's canoe sprint
Representing Belarus
European Games
Bronze medal – third place	2019 Minsk	K-1 200 m

Dzmitry Tratsiakou (born 25 September 1993) is a Belarusian sprint canoeist.

He was selected to compete for Belarus at the 2019 European Games, where he won a bronze medal in the K-1 200 metres.
