= Amado Cruz =

Belizean canoeist

Personal information
- Nationality: Belizean
- Born: 17 November 1987 (age 37)

Sport
- Sport: Canoe sprint

Amado Cruz (born 17 November 1987) is a Belizean canoeist. In 2019, he competed in the men's K-1 200 metres and men's K-1 1000 metres at the 2019 Pan American Games held in Lima, Peru. He also competed in the men's K-1 200 metres and men's K-1 1000 metres events at the 2020 Summer Olympics held in Tokyo, Japan.
