= Bence Horváth (canoeist) =

Hungarian canoeist

Personal information
- Nationality: Hungarian
- Born: 1 August 1992 (age 33) Tata, Hungary
- Height: 1.78 m (5 ft 10 in)

Sport
- Country: Hungary
- Sport: Canoe sprint
- Event: Kayak
Medal record
Men's canoe sprint
Representing Hungary
World Championships
Disqualified	2017 Račice	K-1 200 m
European Championships
Silver medal – second place	2016 Moscow	K-2 200 m
Disqualified	2017 Plovdiv	K-1 200 m

Bence Horváth (born 1 August 1992) is a Hungarian sprint canoeist.

In 2017, Horváth won silver medals in the K-1 200 metre event at both the World and European championships. However, it was subsequently revealed he tested positive for EPO in an out-of-competition test on 12 June that year; as a result, he was stripped of both medals and served a four-year ban backdated to said test.
