= Sergii Tokarnytskyi =

Kazakhstani canoeist (born 1993)

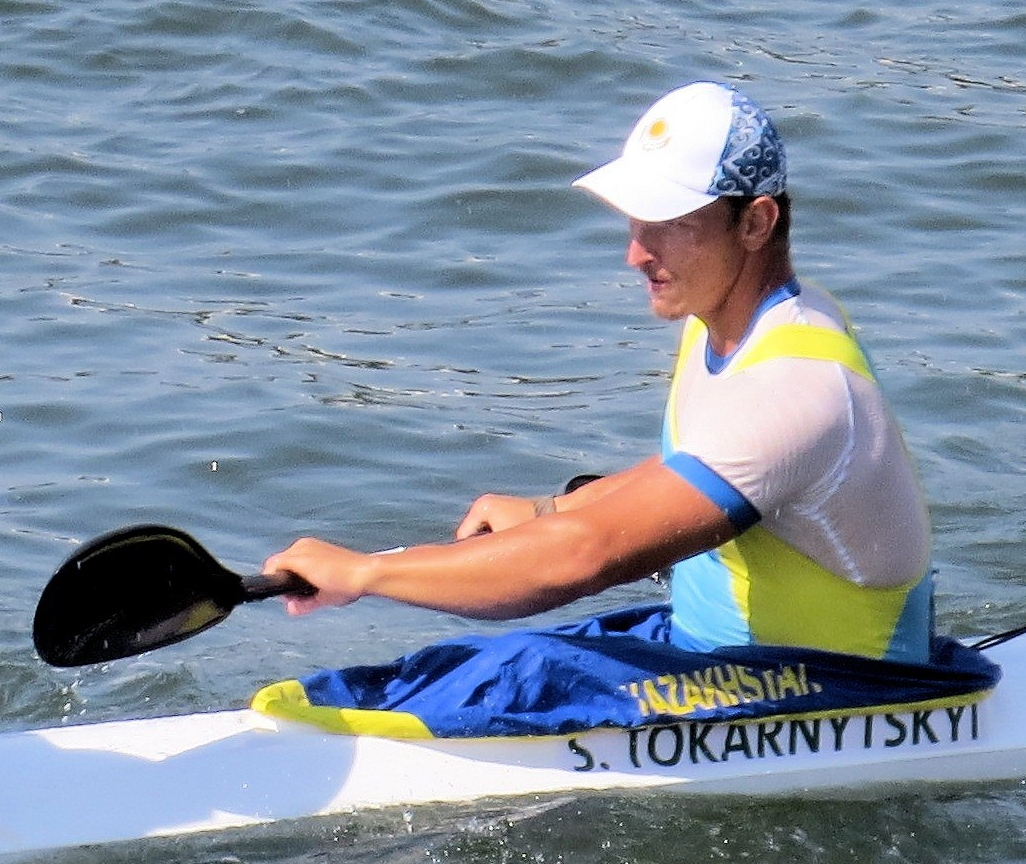
- Tokarnytskyi at the 2016 Olympics

Personal information
- Born: 1 February 1993 (age 33) Dniprodzerzhynsk, Ukraine
- Education: Academy of National Security, Defence and Law Enforcement, Moscow
- Height: 188 cm (6 ft 2 in)
- Weight: 102 kg (225 lb)

Sport
- Country: Kazakhstan
- Sport: Canoe sprint
- Club: Dynamo Astana
- Coached by: Andrey Shantarovich (national)
Medal record
Men's canoe sprint
Representing Kazakhstan
Asian Games
Gold medal – first place	2018 Jakarta-Palembang	K-4 500m
Silver medal – second place	2018 Jakarta-Palembang	K-1 200m
Asian Championships
Gold medal – first place	2015 Palembang	K-1 200 m
Gold medal – first place	2015 Palembang	K-2 200 m
Gold medal – first place	2017 Shanghai	K-1 200 m
Gold medal – first place	2017 Shanghai	K-2 200 m
Gold medal – first place	2017 Shanghai	K-4 500 m
Gold medal – first place	2024 Tokyo	K-2 500 m
Silver medal – second place	2015 Palembang	K-4 1000 m
Silver medal – second place	2022 Rayong	K-2 500 m
Bronze medal – third place	2022 Rayong	K-4 200 m

Sergii Tokarnytskyi (Ukrainian: Сергій Токарницкий, romanized: Sergey Tokarnitsky, born 1 February 1993) is a Ukrainian-born Kazakhstani sprint canoer. He competed in the K-4 1000 m and K-2 200 m events at the 2016 Olympics and finished 10th and 12th, respectively. Tokarnytskyi also competed for Kazakhstan at the 2024 Summer Olympics in the men's K-2 500 metres event.

Born in Ukraine, he later moved to Kazakhstan and received Kazakhstani citizenship in 2013. His partner Tetiana Yakymenko is also a sprint canoer.
