= Balázs Birkás =

Hungarian canoeist (born 1996)

Personal information
- Nationality: Hungarian
- Born: 12 April 1996 (age 30) Szeged, Hungary

Sport
- Country: Hungary
- Sport: Canoe sprint
- Event: Kayaking
- Club: Vasas Sc
Medal record
Men's canoe sprint
Representing Hungary
World Championships
Gold medal – first place	2017 Račice	K-2 200 m
Gold medal – first place	2018 Montemor-o-Velho	K-2 200 m
European Games
Silver medal – second place	2019 Minsk	K-1 200 m
European Championships
Gold medal – first place	2017 Plovdiv	K-2 200 m
Bronze medal – third place	2018 Belgrade	K-2 200 m

Balázs Birkás (born April 12, 1996, in Szeged, Hungary) is a Hungarian sprint sprint canoeist, world and European champion.

== Biography ==
He competes for Vasas SC.

In 2013, at the age of 17, he became a junior world champion at the ICF Junior & U23 Canoe Sprint World Championships in Welland, Canada.

At the 2015 World Championships in Montemor-o-Velho, Portugal, he won a bronze medal in the K1 200 m event.

A year later, at the 2016 World Championships in Minsk, he claimed gold in the same discipline.

In the senior category, Birkás won gold medals at both the 2017 European Championships in Plovdiv and the World Championships in Račice, competing in K2 200 m with partner Márk Balaska.

The pair earned bronze at the 2018 European Championships, then successfully defended their world title at the 2018 Canoe Sprint World Championships.

At the 2019 European Games in Minsk, Birkás won a silver medal in the K1 200 m event.

He participated at the 2018 ICF Canoe Sprint World Championships.

== Major results ==
=== World championships ===
Year	K-1 200	K-2 200	K-4 500
2017		1st place, gold medalist(s)	
2018	4	1st place, gold medalist(s)	
2019		—N/a	5
2023	6	—N/a	
2024	4	—N/a	—N/a
