= Manfredi Rizza =

Italian canoeist (born 1991)

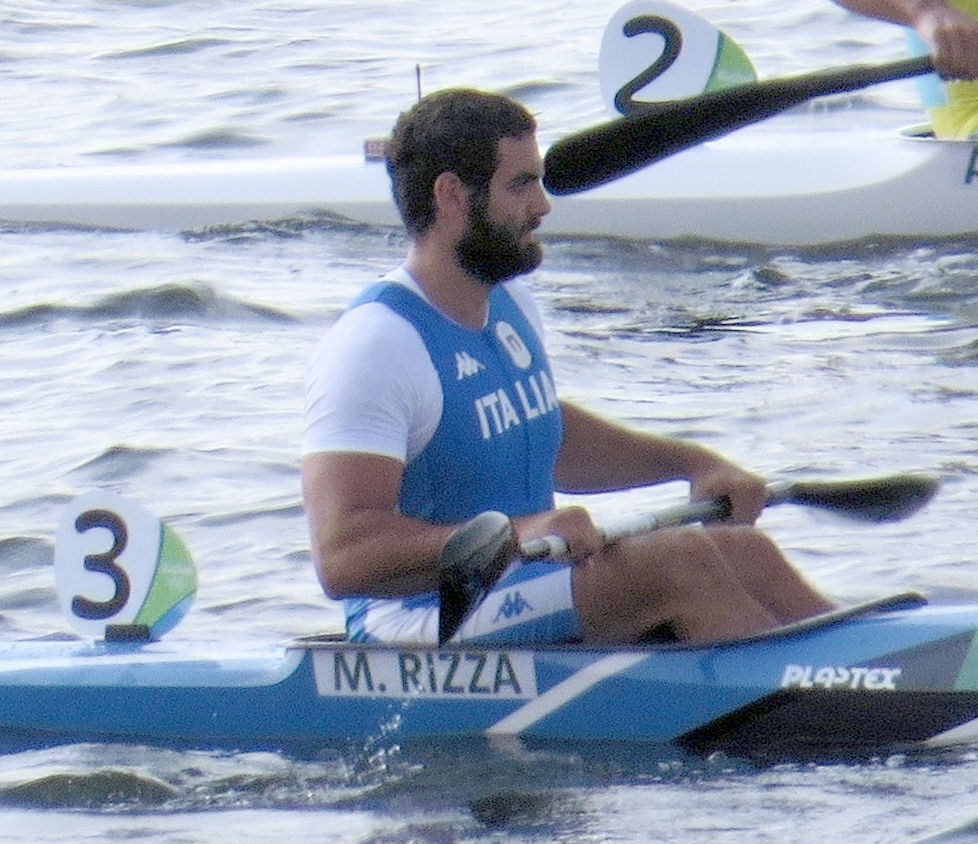
- Rizza at the 2016 Summer Olympics

Personal information
- Born: 26 April 1991 (age 35) Pavia, Italy
- Height: 180 cm (5 ft 11 in)
- Weight: 89 kg (196 lb)

Sport
- Sport: Canoe sprint
- Club: Canottieri Ticino
- Coached by: Stefano Loddo (club); Giuseppe Buonfiglio (national)
Medal record
Men's canoe sprint
Representing Italy
Olympic Games
Silver medal – second place	2020 Tokyo	K-1 200 m
European Championships
Gold medal – first place	2021 Poznań	K-2 200 m
Gold medal – first place	2022 Munich	K-2 200 m
Bronze medal – third place	2024 Szeged	K-4 500 m
Mediterranean Games
Silver medal – second place	2013 Mersin	K-1 200 m

Manfredi "Mampe" Rizza (born 26 April 1991) is an Italian canoeist. He finished sixth in the K-1 200 metres event at the 2016 Summer Olympics. He won a silver medal in Men's K-1 200 metres, at the 2020 Summer Olympics.

== Personal life ==
He studied mechanical engineering at the University of Pavia. Rizza took up kayaking in 2000.
