= Strahinja Stefanović =

Serbian canoeist

Personal information
- Nationality: Serbian
- Born: 7 March 1998 (age 28) Novi Sad, Serbia, FR Yugoslavia
- Height: 1.70 m (5 ft 7 in)
- Weight: 81 kg (179 lb)

Sport
- Country: Serbia
- Sport: Sprint kayak
- Event: K-1 200 m
Medal record
Men's canoe sprint
Representing Serbia
World Championships
Silver medal – second place	2019 Szeged	K-1 200 m
World U23 Championships
Silver medal – second place	2018 Plovdiv	K-1 200 m
European U23 Championships
Silver medal – second place	2019 Račice	K-1 200 m
Bronze medal – third place	2017 Belgrade	K-2 200 m

Strahinja Stefanović (born 7 March 1998) is a Serbian sprint canoeist. He won a silver medal at the 2019 World Championships in K-1 200 m.
