= Aleksejs Rumjancevs =

Latvian canoeist (born 1986)

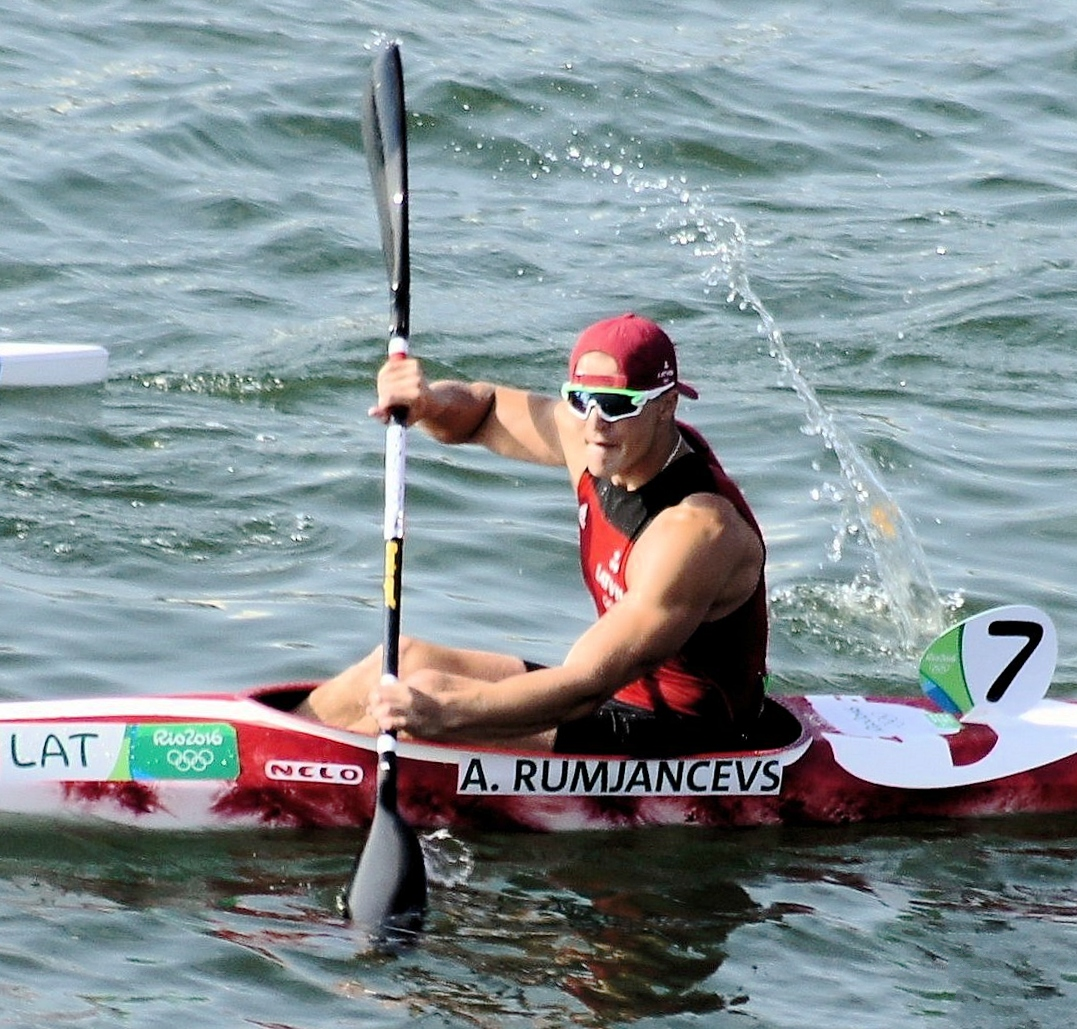
- Rumjancevs at the 2016 Olympics

Personal information
- Nationality: Latvian
- Born: 13 February 1986 (age 40) Rīga, Latvia
- Height: 1.85 m (6 ft 1 in)
- Weight: 90 kg (198 lb)

Sport
- Country: Latvia
- Sport: Canoe sprint
- Event: Kayak
- Coached by: Genadijs Zujevs
Medal record
Men's canoe sprint
Representing Latvia
World Championships
Silver medal – second place	2017 Račice	K-1 200 m
European Games
Bronze medal – third place	2015 Baku	K-1 200 m
European Championships
Bronze medal – third place	2008 Milan	K-1 200 m
Bronze medal – third place	2016 Moscow	K-1 200 m

Aleksejs Rumjancevs (born 13 February 1986) is a Latvian sprint canoer who has competed since the late 2000s. Together with Krists Straume he finished 11th place in the K-2 200 m event at the 2012 Summer Olympics. At the 2016 Olympics, he placed fifth in the individual 200 m race. He was the flag bearer for Latvia during the closing ceremony.

Rumjancevs took up kayaking in 2004. He is married to Julia.
