= Roberts Akmens =

Latvian canoeist (born 1996)

Personal information
- Born: 14 February 1996 (age 30) Talsi, Latvia
- Height: 1.91 m (6 ft 3 in)

Sport
- Country: Latvia
- Sport: Canoe sprint
Medal record
Men's canoe sprint
Representing Latvia
World Championships
Bronze medal – third place	2021 Copenhagen	K-1 200 m
European Games
Bronze medal – third place	2023 Kraków-Małopolska	K-1 200 m
European Championships
Silver medal – second place	2022 Munich	K-1 200 m

Roberts Akmens (born 14 February 1996) is a Latvian sprint canoeist. He competed in the men's K-1 200 metres event at the 2020 Summer Olympics.
