= Maxime Beaumont =

French canoeist (born 1982)

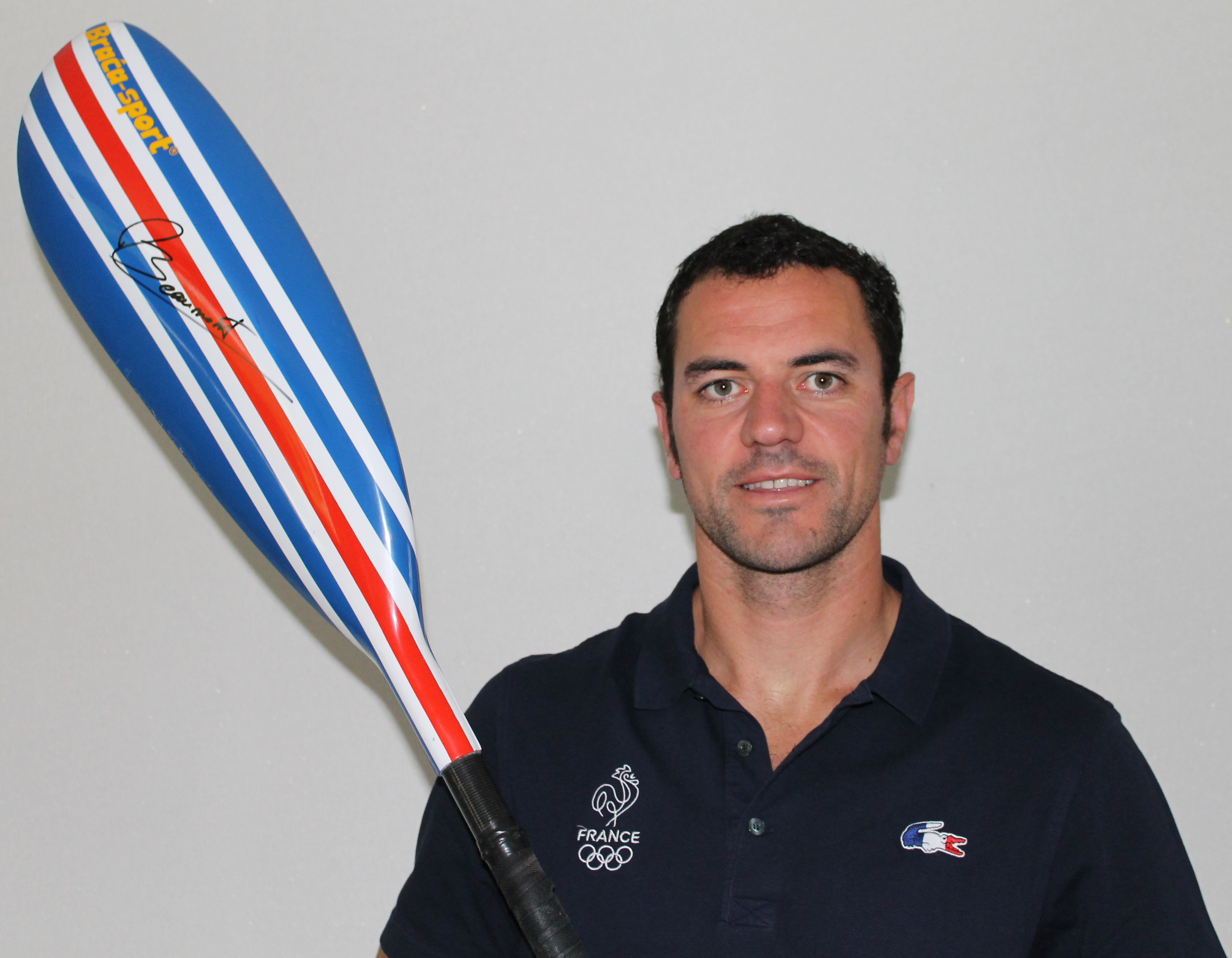
- Beaumont in 2015

Personal information
- Born: 23 April 1982 (age 44) Boulogne-sur-Mer, France
- Height: 191 cm (6 ft 3 in)
- Weight: 94 kg (207 lb)

Sport
- Sport: Canoe sprint
- Club: BCK, Boulogne-sur-Mer
- Coached by: Francois During
Medal record
Men's canoe sprint
Representing France
Olympic Games
Silver medal – second place	2016 Rio de Janeiro	K-1 200 m
World Championships
Silver medal – second place	2014 Moscow	K-1 4×200 m
Silver medal – second place	2015 Milan	K-1 200 m
Bronze medal – third place	2013 Duisburg	K-2 500 m
Bronze medal – third place	2014 Moscow	K-2 200 m
Bronze medal – third place	2015 Milan	K-2 200 m
European Games
Gold medal – first place	2019 Minsk	K-1 200 m
European Championships
Silver medal – second place	2012 Zagreb	K-1 200 m
Silver medal – second place	2014 Brandenburg	K-2 500 m
Bronze medal – third place	2013 Montemor-o-Velho	K-2 200 m
Bronze medal – third place	2017 Plovdiv	K-1 200 m
Bronze medal – third place	2022 Munich	K-4 500 m
Mediterranean Games
Bronze medal – third place	2018 Tarragona	K-1 200 m

Maxime Beaumont (born 23 April 1982) is a French sprint canoeist. He competed in the individual 200 m event at the 2012 and 2016 Olympics and finished fourth and second, respectively. He won four medals in individual and two-man events at the world championships in 2013–2015.

== Career ==
Beamont took up canoeing aged nine and was named Sportsperson of the Year in Boulogne sur Mer in 2014 and 2015. He studies at the National Institute of Sport, Expertise and Performance and plans to become a coach after the 2016 Olympics.
