= Evgenii Lukantsov =

Russian canoeist (born 1991)

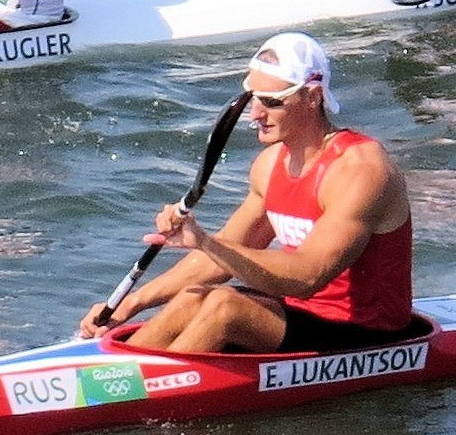
- Lukantsov at the 2016 Olympics

Personal information
- Full name: Evgenii Vyacheslavovich Lukantsov
- Nationality: Russian
- Born: 5 December 1991 (age 34) Irkutsk, Russia
- Height: 187 cm (6 ft 2 in)
- Weight: 91 kg (201 lb)

Sport
- Country: Russia
- Sport: Canoe sprint
- Club: Syntul Centre of Rowing Sport; SKA Rostov
- Coached by: Vladimir Tebenikhin; Natalia Tebenikhina; Oleg Chertov
Medal record
Men's canoe sprint
Representing Russia
World Championships
Bronze medal – third place	2017 Račice	K-1 200 m
Bronze medal – third place	2018 Montemor-o-Velho	K-1 200 m

Evgenii Vyacheslavovich Lukantsov (Russian: Евгений Вячеславович Луканцов, born 5 December 1991) is a Russian canoeist. He competed in the K-1 200 m event at the 2016 Summer Olympics, but failed to reach the final.

Lukantsov has a degree from the Ryazan State Radio Engineering University and later studied sports disciplines at the Southern Federal University. He took up kayaking in 2007 in Ryazan following his elder brother.
