= Rubén Rézola =

Argentine canoeist (born 1991)

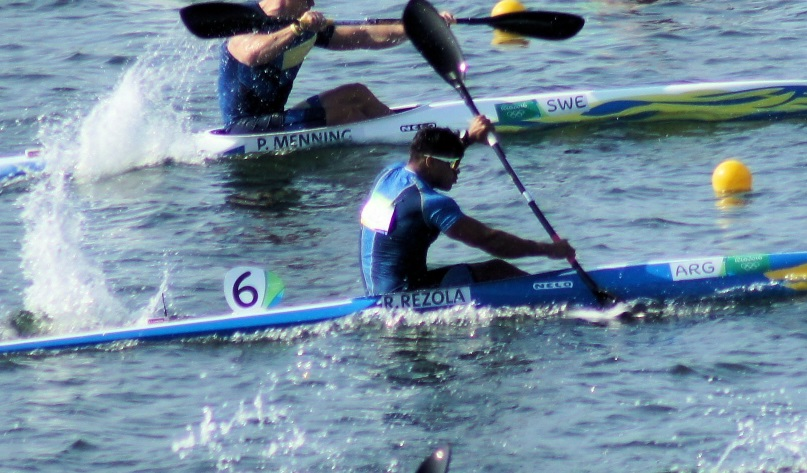
- Rézola at the 2016 Olympics men's K1 200 m heat

Personal information
- Full name: Rubén Oscar Voisard Rézola
- Born: 21 April 1991 (age 35) Santa Fe, Argentina
- Height: 1.74 m (5 ft 9 in)
- Weight: 82 kg (181 lb)

Sport
- Country: Argentina
- Sport: Canoeing
- Event: Sprint canoe
- Club: Asociacion Nautica Reserva; Natural
- Coached by: Damian Dossena
Medal record
Men's canoe sprint
Representing Argentina
Pan American Games
Gold medal – first place	2015 Toronto	K-2 200 m
Silver medal – second place	2011 Guadalajara	K-2 200 m
Bronze medal – third place	2019 Lima	K-1 200 m
South American Games
Gold medal – first place	2026 Santa Fe	K-4 500 m

Rubén Oscar Voisard Rézola (born 21 April 1991 in Santa Fe, Argentina) is an Argentine sprint canoeist. He won the gold medal in the men's kayak doubles (200 m) at the 2015 Pan American Games in Toronto, Canada and silver medal in the men's kayak doubles (200 m) at the 2011 Pan American Games in Guadalajara, Mexico, earning him a spot on the Argentine team for the Olympics. Voisard is also a member of the canoe and kayak team for Argentina's Natural Reserve Boating Association (Spanish: Asociacion Nautica Reserva Natural), and is coached and trained by Damian Dossena.

Voisard represented Argentina at the 2012 Summer Olympics in London, where he competed in the men's K-2 200 metres. Voisard and his partner Miguel Correa finished fifth in the final by four hundredths of a second (0.04) ahead of the Australian pair Jesse Phillips and Stephen Bird, with a time of 35.271 seconds.

At the 2016 Summer Olympics, Rézola competed in K-1 200 m, finishing in 16th place.

He competed in the men's K-1 200 metres at the 2020 Summer Olympics.
