= Marko Dragosavljević =

Serbian sprint canoer (born 1994)

Personal information
- Nickname: Mare
- Nationality: Serbia
- Born: September 25, 1994 (age 31) Novi Sad, FR Yugoslavia
- Height: 1.89 m (6 ft 2 in)
- Weight: 96 kg (212 lb)

Sport
- Sport: Canoe racing
- Club: "Zorka" Šabac
Medal record
Men's canoe sprint
Representing Serbia
Event	1st	2nd	3rd
World Championships	0	1	0
European Games	0	0	3
European Championships	2	3	1
Mediterranean Games	1	1	0
World U23 Championships	1	0	0
European U23 Championships	1	1	1
European Junior Championships	1	1	0
Total	6	7	5
World Championships
Silver medal – second place	2026 Poznań	K-1 200 m
European Games
Bronze medal – third place	2015 Baku	K-1 200 m
Bronze medal – third place	2023 Kraków-Małopolska	K-1 500 m
Bronze medal – third place	2023 Kraków-Małopolska	K-2 500 m
European Championships
Gold medal – first place	2014 Brandenburg	K-1 200 m
Gold medal – first place	2015 Račice	K-1 200 m
Silver medal – second place	2013 Montemor-o-Velho	K-1 200 m
Silver medal – second place	2013 Montemor-o-Velho	K-2 500 m
Silver medal – second place	2017 Plovdiv	K-1 200 m
Bronze medal – third place	2018 Belgrade	K-1 200 m
Mediterranean Games
Gold medal – first place	2013 Mersin	K-1 200 m
Silver medal – second place	2018 Tarragona	K-1 200 m
World U23 Championships
Gold medal – first place	2015 Montemor-o-Velho	K-1 200 m
European U23 Championships
Gold medal – first place	2017 Belgrade	K-1 200 m
Silver medal – second place	2015 Bascov	K-2 200 m
Bronze medal – third place	2016 Plovdiv	K-2 200 m
European Junior Championships
Gold medal – first place	2012 Montemor-o-Velho	K-2 500 m
Silver medal – second place	2012 Montemor-o-Velho	K-1 200 m

Marko Dragosavljević (Serbian Cyrillic: Марко Драгосављевић; born 25 September 1994) is a Serbian sprint canoer. He competed for Serbia at the 2024 Summer Olympics.

Dragosavljević won four silver medals at Canoe Sprint European Championships, three in K-1 200 m and one in K-2 500 m, with Simo Boltić). At Mediterranean Games he won a gold in K-1 200 m.

When he was junior, he won two medals at the European Junior Championships, gold in K-2 500 m, with Simo Boltić, and silver in K-1 200 m for Serbia.

Marko, nicknamed Mare, is a member of the Zorka Color canoe club in Šabac. He is from Bačka Palanka
