= Artūras Seja =

Lithuanian canoeist (born 1996)

Personal information
- Nationality: Lithuanian
- Born: 17 March 1996 (age 30)

Sport
- Country: Lithuania
- Sport: Canoe sprint
- Event: Kayak
Medal record
Men's canoe sprint
Representing Lithuania
World Championships
Gold medal – first place	2023 Duisburg	K-1 200 m
Silver medal – second place	2018 Montemor-o-Velho	K-1 200 m
European Championships
Silver medal – second place	2018 Belgrade	K-1 200 m
Silver medal – second place	2021 Poznań	K-2 200 m
Bronze medal – third place	2022 Munich	K-2 200 m

Artūras Seja (born 17 March 1996) is a Lithuanian sprint canoeist.

He won K-1 200m silver in the 2018 European Championships and the 2018 World Championships.
