= Carlos Garrote =

Spanish canoeist

Personal information
- Nationality: Spanish
- Born: 16 July 1991 (age 34) Zamora, Spain

Sport
- Country: Spain
- Sport: Sprint kayak
Medal record
Men's canoe sprint
Representing Spain
World Championships
Gold medal – first place	2018 Montemor-o-Velho	K-1 200 m
Silver medal – second place	2017 Račice	K-2 200 m
Silver medal – second place	2017 Račice	K-4 500 m
Bronze medal – third place	2019 Szeged	K-1 200 m
Bronze medal – third place	2023 Duisburg	K-1 200 m
Bronze medal – third place	2024 Samarkand	K-1 200 m
European Championships
Gold medal – first place	2018 Belgrade	K-1 200 m
Bronze medal – third place	2017 Plovdiv	K-1 200 m
Mediterranean Games
Gold medal – first place	2018 Taragona	K-1 200 m

Carlos Garrote (born 16 July 1991) is a Spanish sprint canoeist.

He became the European K-1 200m champion in 2018 and has also won a couple of World Championship medals in other events from 2017.

== Major results ==
=== World championships ===
Year	K-1 200	K-2 200	K-4 500	XK-2 200	K–1 4 × 200
2013			—N/a	—N/a	5
2014			—N/a	—N/a	6
2017		2nd place, silver medalist(s)	2nd place, silver medalist(s)	—N/a	—N/a
2018	1st place, gold medalist(s)			—N/a	—N/a
2019	3rd place, bronze medalist(s)			—N/a	—N/a
2021	1 FB	—N/a	7	4	—N/a
2023	3rd place, bronze medalist(s)	—N/a		—N/a	—N/a
2024	3rd place, bronze medalist(s)	—N/a	—N/a	—N/a	—N/a
