= Paweł Kaczmarek (canoeist) =

Polish canoeist (born 1995)

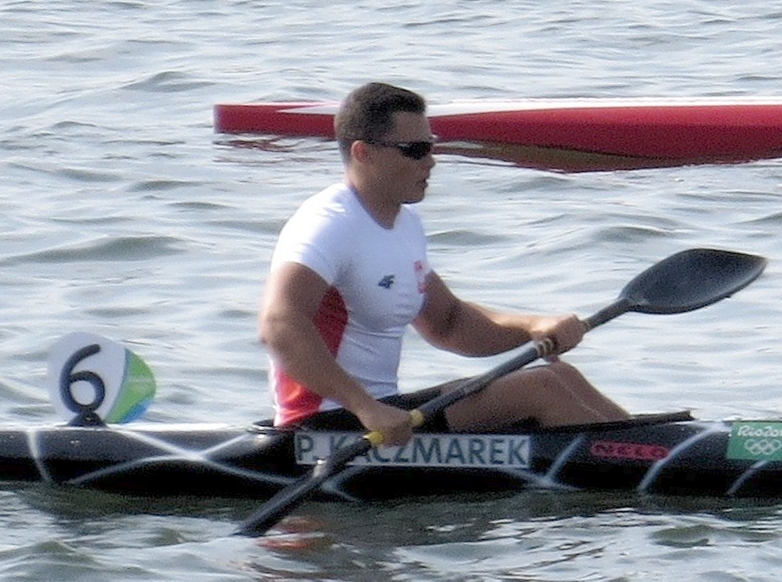
- Kaczmarek at the 2016 Olympics

Personal information
- Born: 8 September 1995 (age 30) Człuchów, Poland
- Education: University of Physical Education
- Height: 183 cm (6 ft 0 in)
- Weight: 85 kg (187 lb)

Sport
- Country: Poland
- Sport: Canoe sprint
- Club: AZS AWF Gorzow Wielkopolski
- Coached by: Marek Zachara (club); Vladimir Parfenovich (national)

Paweł Kaczmarek (born 8 September 1995) is a Polish sprint kayaker. He competed in the K-1 200 m event at the 2016 Summer Olympics, but failed to reach the final. In 2015 he was named Athlete of the Year of the Lubusz Voivodeship.
