= Filip Šváb =

Czech canoeist

Personal information
- Born: 28 April 1983 (age 43) Olomouc, Czechoslovakia

Sport
- Sport: Canoe sprint

Filip Šváb (born 28 April 1983) is a Czech canoeist. He competed in the men's K-1 200 metres event at the 2016 Summer Olympics.
