= Cho Gwang-hee =

South Korean canoeist (born 1993)

Personal information
- Born: 24 December 1993 (age 32) Buyeo County, South Chungcheong Province, South Korea

Sport
- Sport: Canoe sprint
Medal record
Men's canoe sprint
Representing South Korea
Asian Games
Gold medal – first place	2026 Aichi–Nagoya	K-2 500 m
Gold medal – first place	2026 Aichi–Nagoya	K-4 500 m
Asian Championships
Gold medal – first place	2024 Tokyo	K-1 200 m
Silver medal – second place	2015 Palembang	K-1 200 m
Silver medal – second place	2015 Palembang	K-2 200 m
Silver medal – second place	2024 Tokyo	K-2 500 m
Silver medal – second place	2025 Nanchang	K-4 500 m

Cho Gwang-hee (Korean pronunciation: [tɕo.ɡwaŋ.ɦi] or [tɕo] [kwaŋ.ɦi]; born 24 December 1993) is a South Korean canoeist. He competed in the men's K-1 200 metres event at the 2016 Summer Olympics.

== Major results ==
=== Olympic Games ===
Year	K-1 200	K-2 200
2016	4 FB	1 FB
2020	5 FB	—N/a

=== World championships ===
Year	K-1 200	K-1 500	K-2 500	K-4 500
2013	2 FC			
2014	DNS H			
2015	7 FB			
2017	9 SF			
2019	6 FB			9 SF
2023	8		DNS FB	6 FB
2024	8	5 FB	—N/a	—N/a
