= Petter Menning =

Swedish kayaker

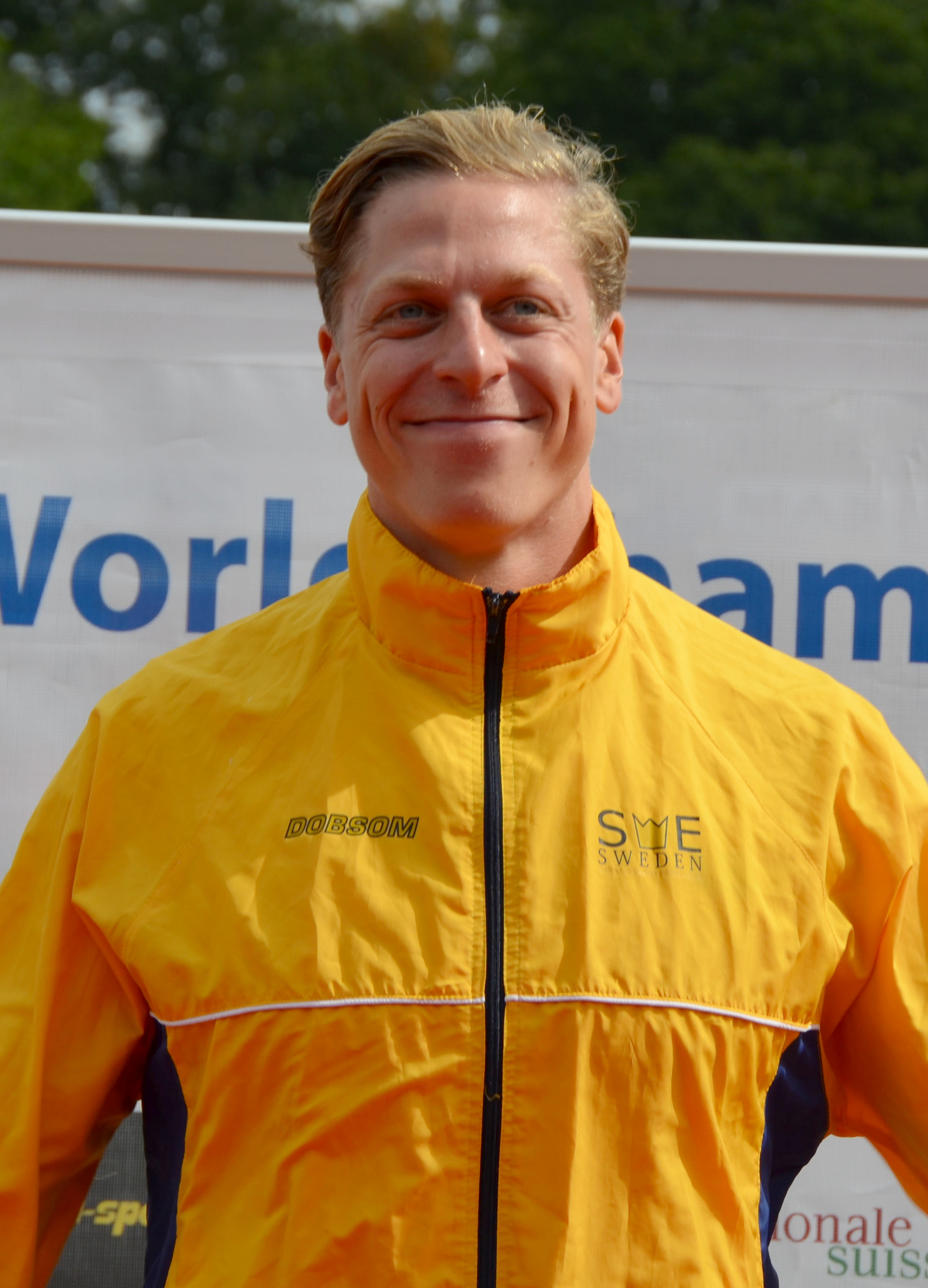
- Menning at the 2013 World Championships

Personal information
- Born: 8 August 1987 (age 38) Hägersten, Sweden
- Education: Stockholm University
- Height: 187 cm (6 ft 2 in)
- Weight: 92 kg (203 lb)

Sport
- Sport: Canoe sprint
- Club: Vaxholms Kanotsallskap
- Coached by: Martin Hunter
Medal record
Representing Sweden
World Championships
Gold medal – first place	2013 Duisburg	K-1 200 m
Silver medal – second place	2014 Moscow	K-1 200 m
Silver medal – second place	2021 Copenhagen	K-1 200 m
Silver medal – second place	2022 Dartmouth	K-1 200 m
Bronze medal – third place	2015 Milan	K-1 200 m
European Games
Gold medal – first place	2015 Baku	K-1 200 m
Silver medal – second place	2023 Kraków-Małopolska	K-1 200 m
European Championships
Gold medal – first place	2013 Montemor-o-Velho	K-1 200 m
Silver medal – second place	2015 Račice	K-1 200 m
Silver medal – second place	2016 Moscow	K-1 200 m
Bronze medal – third place	2021 Poznań	K-1 200 m
Bronze medal – third place	2022 Munich	K-1 200 m

Petter Menning (né Öström on 8 August 1987) is a Swedish sprint canoeist. He won the gold medal in the men's K-1 200 metres at the European Championships. Later in 2013, he won the world title in the same event. He was named Swedish Kayaker of the Year in 2013 and 2014. Menning placed tenth over K-1 200 m at the 2016 Olympics and at the 2020 Olympics he placed sixth over the same distance.
