= 2017 ICF Canoe Sprint World Championships – Men's K-2 1000 metres =

Men's K-2 1000 metres at the 2017 ICF Canoe Sprint World Championships
- Venue: Sportcentrum Račice
- Location: Račice, Czech Republic
- Dates: 24–26 August
- Competitors: 64 from 32 nations
- Winning time: 3:08.647

Medalists
gold medal	Milenko Zorić; Marko Tomićević	Serbia
silver medal	Peter Gelle; Adam Botek	Slovakia
bronze medal	Daniel Havel; Jakub Špicar	Czech Republic

The men's K-2 1000 metres competition at the 2017 ICF Canoe Sprint World Championships in Račice took place at the Sportcentrum Račice.

== Schedule ==
The schedule was as follows:

Date	Time	Round
Thursday 24 August 2017	11:56	Heats
Thursday 24 August 2017	17:55	Semifinals
Saturday 26 August 2017	10:20	Final B
Saturday 26 August 2017	12:08	Final A

All times are Central European Summer Time (UTC+2)

== Results ==
=== Heats ===
The six fastest boats in each heat, plus the three fastest remaining boats advanced to the semifinals.

==== Heat 1 ====
Rank	Kayakers	Country	Time	Notes
1	Max Hoff; Marcus Gross	Germany	3:16.029	QS
2	Oleg Siniavin; Maxim Spesivtsev	Russia	3:20.273	QS
3	Francisco Cubelos; Iñigo Peña	Spain	3:20.357	QS
4	Emanuel Silva; João Ribeiro	Portugal	3:20.468	QS
5	Ilya Golendov; Andrey Yerguchyov	Kazakhstan	3:21.657	QS
6	Nicola Ripamonti; Giulio Dressino	Italy	3:22.051	QS
7	Ali Aghamirzaei; Ahmad Reza Talebian	Iran	3:22.501	qS
8	Mathew Bowley; Daniel Johnson	Great Britain	3:26.484	qS
9	Maksim Bondar; Igor Dorofeev	Kyrgyzstan	3:53.607	

==== Heat 2 ====
Rank	Kayakers	Country	Time	Notes
1	Vitaliy Tsurkan; Oleh Kukharyk	Ukraine	3:18.510	QS
2	Daniel Havel; Jakub Špicar	Czech Republic	3:19.155	QS
3	Kenny Wallace; Jordan Wood	Australia	3:22.960	QS
4	Ričardas Nekriošius; Andrej Olijnik	Lithuania	3:24.749	QS
5	Eivind Vold; Jon Amund Vold	Norway	3:25.077	QS
6	Albert Petersson; Henrik Strand	Sweden	3:27.905	QS
7	Aditep Srichart; Praison Buasamrong	Thailand	3:51.577	
8	Li Zhuang; Yan Jiahao	China	3:51.849	

==== Heat 3 ====
Rank	Kayakers	Country	Time	Notes
1	Milenko Zorić; Marko Tomićević	Serbia	3:17.241	QS
2	Tibor Hufnágel; Róbert Ilyés	Hungary	3:18.458	QS
3	Bartosz Stabno; Rafał Rosolski	Poland	3:18.597	QS
4	Guillaume Burger; Cyrille Carré	France	3:21.447	QS
5	Sholhrukhbek Azamov; Javohir Nurmatov	Uzbekistan	3:21.813	QS
6	Javier López Quintero; Osbaldo Fuentes	Mexico	3:23.269	QS
7	Fabio Wyss; Stefan Domeisen	Switzerland	3:24.035	qS
8	Andri Sugiarto; Sutrisno Sutrisno	Indonesia	3:34.685	

==== Heat 4 ====
Rank	Kayakers	Country	Time	Notes
1	Peter Gelle; Adam Botek	Slovakia	3:23.339	QS
2	Jarett Kenke; Marshall Hughes	Canada	3:24.922	QS
3	Casper Pretzmann; Morten Graversen	Denmark	3:25.561	QS
4	Jeremy Hakala; Miika Nykänen	Finland	3:30.072	QS
5	Kim Ji-won; Park Juhyeon	South Korea	3:36.078	QS
6	Arambam Gyanjit Singh; Albert Raj Selvaraj	India	3:45.339	QS
7	Muhammad Syaheenul Aiman; Teo Guang Yi Lucas	Singapore	3:52.256	

=== Semifinals ===
Qualification in each semi was as follows:

The fastest three boats advanced to the A final.
The next three fastest boats advanced to the B final.

==== Semifinal 1 ====
Rank	Kayakers	Country	Time	Notes
1	Peter Gelle; Adam Botek	Slovakia	3:15.924	QA
2	Bartosz Stabno; Rafał Rosolski	Poland	3:16.352	QA
3	Vitaliy Tsurkan; Oleh Kukharyk	Ukraine	3:16.446	QA
4	Guillaume Burger; Cyrille Carré	France	3:17.691	QB
5	Nicola Ripamonti; Giulio Dressino	Italy	3:19.930	QB
6	Oleg Siniavin; Maxim Spesivtsev	Russia	3:20.657	QB
7	Ali Aghamirzaei; Ahmad Reza Talebian	Iran	3:21.274	
8	Albert Petersson; Henrik Strand	Sweden	3:33.235	
9	Kim Ji-won; Park Juhyeon	South Korea	3:33.985	

==== Semifinal 2 ====
Rank	Kayakers	Country	Time	Notes
1	Milenko Zorić; Marko Tomićević	Serbia	3:14.737	QA
2	Francisco Cubelos; Iñigo Peña	Spain	3:17.164	QA
3	Ričardas Nekriošius; Andrej Olijnik	Lithuania	3:17.537	QA
4	Ilya Golendov; Andrey Yerguchyov	Kazakhstan	3:18.370	QB
5	Kenny Wallace; Jordan Wood	Australia	3:21.120	QB
6	Jeremy Hakala; Miika Nykänen	Finland	3:23.764	QB
7	Fabio Wyss; Stefan Domeisen	Switzerland	3:24.803	
8	Javier López Quintero; Osbaldo Fuentes	Mexico	3:25.359	
9	Jarett Kenke; Marshall Hughes	Canada	3:39.103	

==== Semifinal 3 ====
Rank	Kayakers	Country	Time	Notes
1	Max Hoff; Marcus Gross	Germany	3:13.916	QA
2	Tibor Hufnágel; Róbert Ilyés	Hungary	3:15.883	QA
3	Daniel Havel; Jakub Špicar	Czech Republic	3:16.271	QA
4	Emanuel Silva; João Ribeiro	Portugal	3:18.616	QB
5	Eivind Vold; Jon Amund Vold	Norway	3:20.538	QB
6	Casper Pretzmann; Morten Graversen	Denmark	3:23.594	QB
7	Mathew Bowley; Daniel Johnson	Great Britain	3:25.599	
8	Sholhrukhbek Azamov; Javohir Nurmatov	Uzbekistan	3:25.938	
9	Arambam Gyanjit Singh; Albert Raj Selvaraj	India	3:47.077	

=== Finals ===
==== Final B ====
Competitors in this final raced for positions 10 to 18.

Rank	Kayakers	Country	Time
1	Oleg Siniavin; Maxim Spesivtsev	Russia	3:12.677
2	Guillaume Burger; Cyrille Carré	France	3:12.832
3	Nicola Ripamonti; Giulio Dressino	Italy	3:14.138
4	Ilya Golendov; Andrey Yerguchyov	Kazakhstan	3:15.110
5	Eivind Vold; Jon Amund Vold	Norway	3:15.477
6	Kenny Wallace; Jordan Wood	Australia	3:16.160
7	Casper Pretzmann; Morten Graversen	Denmark	3:17.999
8	Emanuel Silva; João Ribeiro	Portugal	3:19.132
9	Jeremy Hakala; Miika Nykänen	Finland	3:20.577

==== Final A ====
Competitors in this final raced for positions 1 to 9, with medals going to the top three.

Rank	Kayakers	Country	Time
1st place, gold medalist(s)	Milenko Zorić; Marko Tomićević	Serbia	3:08.647
2nd place, silver medalist(s)	Peter Gelle; Adam Botek	Slovakia	3:10.725
3rd place, bronze medalist(s)	Daniel Havel; Jakub Špicar	Czech Republic	3:10.853
4	Tibor Hufnágel; Róbert Ilyés	Hungary	3:12.053
5	Max Hoff; Marcus Gross	Germany	3:12.786
6	Francisco Cubelos; Iñigo Peña	Spain	3:12.797
7	Ričardas Nekriošius; Andrej Olijnik	Lithuania	3:13.175
8	Bartosz Stabno; Rafał Rosolski	Poland	3:14.714
9	Vitaliy Tsurkan; Oleh Kukharyk	Ukraine	3:16.086
