= 2019 ICF Canoe Sprint World Championships – Men's K-4 500 metres =

Men's K-4 500 metres at the 2019 ICF Canoe Sprint World Championships
- Venue: Olympic Centre of Szeged
- Location: Szeged, Hungary
- Dates: 22–25 August
- Competitors: 144 from 36 nations
- Winning time: 1:19.26

Medalists
gold medal	Tom Liebscher; Ronald Rauhe; Max Rendschmidt; Max Lemke	Germany
silver medal	Saúl Craviotto; Carlos Arévalo; Rodrigo Germade; Marcus Walz	Spain
bronze medal	Erik Vlček; Adam Botek; Csaba Zalka; Samuel Baláž	Slovakia

The men's K-4 500 metres competition at the 2019 ICF Canoe Sprint World Championships in Szeged took place at the Olympic Centre of Szeged.

== Schedule ==
The schedule was as follows:

Date	Time	Round
Thursday 22 August 2019	17:15	Heats
Saturday 24 August 2019	17:18	Semifinals
Sunday 25 August 2019	10:38	Final B
Sunday 25 August 2019	13:21	Final A

All times are Central European Summer Time (UTC+2)

== Results ==
=== Heats ===
The six fastest boats in each heat, plus the three fastest seventh-place boats advanced to the semifinals.

==== Heat 1 ====
Rank	Kayakers	Country	Time	Notes
1	Tom Liebscher; Ronald Rauhe; Max Rendschmidt; Max Lemke	Germany	1:18.60	QS
2	Daniel Havel; Jakub Špicar; Lukáš Nepraš; Jakub Zavřel	Czech Republic	1:19.26	QS
3	Zhang Dong; Xu Haitao; Wang Congkang; Bu Tingkai	China	1:19.73	QS
4	Mark de Jonge; Pierre-Luc Poulin; Nicholas Matveev; Simon McTavish	Canada	1:19.84	QS
5	Rafał Rosolski; Martin Brzeziński; Bartosz Stabno; Przemysław Korsak	Poland	1:20.67	QS
6	Erik Sandbacka; Martin Nathell; David Johansson; Theodor Orban	Sweden	1:22.29	QS
7	Cho Gwang-hee; Choi Min-kyu; Hwang Min-jun; Kim Tae-hyeon	South Korea	1:22.46	qS
8	Michael Arthur; David Rodrigues; Nicholas Weeks; David Gerber	South Africa	1:24.52	
9	Edgar Tutyan; Vladimir Alaverdyan; Hayk Tadevosyan; Artur Akishin	Armenia	1:34.20	

==== Heat 2 ====
Rank	Kayakers	Country	Time	Notes
1	Maxime Beaumont; Guillaume Burger; Francis Mouget; Guillaume Le Floch Decorchemont	France	1:19.07	QS
2	Lachlan Tame; Matthew Goble; Thomas Green; Jackson Collins	Australia	1:19.90	QS
3	Marko Dragosavljević; Vladimir Torubarov; Nebojša Grujić; Stefan Vekić	Serbia	1:20.01	QS
4	Nicola Ripamonti; Mauro Pra Floriani; Andrea Di Liberto; Alessandro Gnecchi	Italy	1:20.50	QS
5	Juan Ignacio Cáceres; Gonzalo Carreras; Ezequiel Di Giacomo; Manuel Lascano	Argentina	1:21.30	QS
6	Lars Hjemdal; Hakeem Teland; Vemund Jensen; Gunnar Eide	Norway	1:22.01	QS
7	Mathew Bowley; Matthew Robinson; Lewis Fletcher; Ieuan James	Great Britain	1:23.22	
8	Hristo Rekov; Radoslav Stefanov; Denislav Tsvetanov; Todor Kolevski	Bulgaria	1:23.47	
9	Sunny Kumar; Atul Kumar; Sharma Ajatsatru; Jetli Singh Ningthoujam	India	1:32.72	

==== Heat 3 ====
Rank	Kayakers	Country	Time	Notes
1	Erik Vlček; Adam Botek; Csaba Zalka; Samuel Baláž	Slovakia	1:18.63	QS
2	Aliaksei Misiuchenka; Stanislau Daineka; Uladzislau Litvinau; Dzmitry Natynchyk	Belarus	1:19.22	QS
3	Kyrylo Cernomorov; Ivan Semykin; Dmytro Danylenko; Denys Lakmanov	Ukraine	1:19.65	QS
4	Emanuel Silva; João Ribeiro; David Varela; Messias Baptista	Portugal	1:19.76	QS
5	Aurimas Lankas; Edvinas Ramanauskas; Mindaugas Maldonis; Simonas Maldonis	Lithuania	1:20.11	QS
6	Aleksejs Rumjancevs; Kaspars Tiklenieks; Deniss Volkovs; Aldis Arturs Vilde	Latvia	1:21.05	QS
7	Miika Nykänen; Jeremy Hakala; Joona Mäntynen; Otto Sivula	Finland	1:22.97	qS
8	Yavuz Selim Balci; Mustafa Özmen; Fahri Ayvaz; Serkan Kakkaç	Turkey	1:23.48	
9	Nathaniel Errez; Timothy Burdiak; Nathan Humberston; Thom Crockett	United States	1:26.28	

==== Heat 4 ====
Rank	Kayakers	Country	Time	Notes
1	Balázs Birkás; Bence Nádas; Sándor Tótka; István Kuli	Hungary	1:18.01	QS
2	Saúl Craviotto; Carlos Arévalo; Rodrigo Germade; Marcus Walz	Spain	1:18.10	QS
3	Momotaro Matsushita; Hiroki Fujishima; Keiji Mizumoto; Yusuke Miyata	Japan	1:19.10	QS
4	Aleksandr Sergeyev; Oleg Gusev; Vitaly Ershov; Artem Kuzakhmetov	Russia	1:19.17	QS
5	Vilyam Ibragimov; Shakhriyor Makhkamov; Javokhir Nurmatov; Shokhrukhbek Azamov	Uzbekistan	1:21.16	QS
6	Daulet Sultanbekov; Andrey Yerguchyov; Ilya Golendov; Ivan Lukyanov	Kazakhstan	1:21.37	QS
7	Florin Vlase; Aurelian-Mădălin Ciocan; George Săndulescu; Constantin Mironescu	Romania	1:21.59	qS
8	Ahmad Reza Talebian; Ali Aghamirzaei; Peyman Ghavidel Siah Sofiani; Omid Ahmadi	Iran	1:24.69	
9	Abdusattor Gafurov; Saidilhomkhon Nazirov; Tohir Nurmuhammadi; Zohirjon Nabiev	Tajikistan	1:32.43	

=== Semifinals ===
Qualification in each semi was as follows:

The fastest three boats advanced to the A final.
The next three fastest boats advanced to the B final.

==== Semifinal 1 ====
Rank	Kayakers	Country	Time	Notes
1	Tom Liebscher; Ronald Rauhe; Max Rendschmidt; Max Lemke	Germany	1:20.03	QA
2	Aleksandr Sergeyev; Oleg Gusev; Vitaly Ershov; Artem Kuzakhmetov	Russia	1:20.70	QA
3	Aliaksei Misiuchenka; Stanislau Daineka; Uladzislau Litvinau; Dzmitry Natynchyk	Belarus	1:20.97	QA
4	Momotaro Matsushita; Hiroki Fujishima; Keiji Mizumoto; Yusuke Miyata	Japan	1:22.09	QB
5	Aurimas Lankas; Edvinas Ramanauskas; Mindaugas Maldonis; Simonas Maldonis	Lithuania	1:22.43	QB
6	Lachlan Tame; Matthew Goble; Thomas Green; Jackson Collins	Australia	1:22.64	QB
7	Florin Vlase; Aurelian-Mădălin Ciocan; George Săndulescu; Constantin Mironescu	Romania	1:24.16	
8	Rafał Rosolski; Martin Brzeziński; Bartosz Stabno; Przemysław Korsak	Poland	1:24.53	
9	Lars Hjemdal; Hakeem Teland; Vemund Jensen; Gunnar Eide	Norway	1:26.04	

==== Semifinal 2 ====
Rank	Kayakers	Country	Time	Notes
1	Saúl Craviotto; Carlos Arévalo; Rodrigo Germade; Marcus Walz	Spain	1:20.27	QA
2	Emanuel Silva; João Ribeiro; David Varela; Messias Baptista	Portugal	1:21.09	QA
3	Maxime Beaumont; Guillaume Burger; Francis Mouget; Guillaume Le Floch Decorchemont	France	1:21.28	QA
4	Kyrylo Cernomorov; Ivan Semykin; Dmytro Danylenko; Denys Lakmanov	Ukraine	1:21.82	QB
5	Mark de Jonge; Pierre-Luc Poulin; Nicholas Matveev; Simon McTavish	Canada	1:23.19	QB
6	Daulet Sultanbekov; Andrey Yerguchyov; Ilya Golendov; Ivan Lukyanov	Kazakhstan	1:23.40	QB
7	Zhang Dong; Xu Haitao; Wang Congkang; Bu Tingkai	China	1:24.26	
8	Juan Ignacio Cáceres; Gonzalo Carreras; Ezequiel Di Giacomo; Manuel Lascano	Argentina	1:24.78	
9	Cho Gwang-hee; Choi Min-kyu; Hwang Min-jun; Kim Tae-hyeon	South Korea	1:25.63	

==== Semifinal 3 ====
Rank	Kayakers	Country	Time	Notes
1	Erik Vlček; Adam Botek; Csaba Zalka; Samuel Baláž	Slovakia	1:19.83	QA
2	Balázs Birkás; Bence Nádas; Sándor Tótka; István Kuli	Hungary	1:20.33	QA
3	Daniel Havel; Jakub Špicar; Lukáš Nepraš; Jakub Zavřel	Czech Republic	1:20.35	QA
4	Nicola Ripamonti; Mauro Pra Floriani; Andrea Di Liberto; Alessandro Gnecchi	Italy	1:20.61	QB
5	Aleksejs Rumjancevs; Kaspars Tiklenieks; Deniss Volkovs; Aldis Arturs Vilde	Latvia	1:21.15	QB
6	Marko Dragosavljević; Vladimir Torubarov; Nebojša Grujić; Stefan Vekić	Serbia	1:22.06	QB
7	Erik Sandbacka; Martin Nathell; David Johansson; Theodor Orban	Sweden	1:24.07	
8	Vilyam Ibragimov; Shakhriyor Makhkamov; Javokhir Nurmatov; Shokhrukhbek Azamov	Uzbekistan	1:24.33	
–	Miika Nykänen; Jeremy Hakala; Joona Mäntynen; Otto Sivula	Finland	DNS	

=== Finals ===
==== Final B ====
Competitors in this final raced for positions 10 to 18.

Rank	Kayakers	Country	Time
1	Lachlan Tame; Matthew Goble; Thomas Green; Jackson Collins	Australia	1:23.43
2	Nicola Ripamonti; Mauro Pra Floriani; Andrea Di Liberto; Alessandro Gnecchi	Italy	1:23.67
3	Momotaro Matsushita; Hiroki Fujishima; Keiji Mizumoto; Yusuke Miyata	Japan	1:23.88
4	Aurimas Lankas; Edvinas Ramanauskas; Mindaugas Maldonis; Simonas Maldonis	Lithuania	1:23.93
5	Mark de Jonge; Pierre-Luc Poulin; Nicholas Matveev; Simon McTavish	Canada	1:24.21
6	Aleksejs Rumjancevs; Kaspars Tiklenieks; Deniss Volkovs; Aldis Arturs Vilde	Latvia	1:24.39
7	Marko Dragosavljević; Vladimir Torubarov; Nebojša Grujić; Stefan Vekić	Serbia	1:25.67
8	Kyrylo Cernomorov; Ivan Semykin; Dmytro Danylenko; Denys Lakmanov	Ukraine	1:26.16
9	Daulet Sultanbekov; Andrey Yerguchyov; Ilya Golendov; Ivan Lukyanov	Kazakhstan	1:27.20

==== Final A ====
Competitors raced for positions 1 to 9, with medals going to the top three.

Rank	Kayakers	Country	Time
1st place, gold medalist(s)	Tom Liebscher; Ronald Rauhe; Max Rendschmidt; Max Lemke	Germany	1:19.26
2nd place, silver medalist(s)	Saúl Craviotto; Carlos Arévalo; Rodrigo Germade; Marcus Walz	Spain	1:19.77
3rd place, bronze medalist(s)	Erik Vlček; Adam Botek; Csaba Zalka; Samuel Baláž	Slovakia	1:20.96
4	Aleksandr Sergeyev; Oleg Gusev; Vitaly Ershov; Artem Kuzakhmetov	Russia	1:21.00
5	Balázs Birkás; Bence Nádas; Sándor Tótka; István Kuli	Hungary	1:21.10
6	Emanuel Silva; João Ribeiro; David Varela; Messias Baptista	Portugal	1:21.11
7	Aliaksei Misiuchenka; Stanislau Daineka; Uladzislau Litvinau; Dzmitry Natynchyk	Belarus	1:21.29
8	Maxime Beaumont; Guillaume Burger; Francis Mouget; Guillaume Le Floch Decorchemont	France	1:21.40
9	Daniel Havel; Jakub Špicar; Lukáš Nepraš; Jakub Zavřel	Czech Republic	1:21.60
