= Canoe sprint at the 2019 European Games – Men's K-4 500 metres =

Men's K-4 500 metres at the 2019 European Games
- Venue: Zaslavl Regatta Course
- Date: 25–27 June
- Competitors: 44 from 11 nations
- Winning time: 1:32.376

Medalists
gold medal	Artem Kuzakhmetov; Aleksandr Sergeyev; Oleg Gusev; Vitaly Ershov	Russia
silver medal	Max Rendschmidt; Ronald Rauhe; Tom Liebscher; Max Lemke	Germany
bronze medal	Samuel Baláž; Erik Vlček; Csaba Zalka; Adam Botek	Slovakia

The men's K-4 500 metres canoe sprint competition at the 2019 European Games in Minsk took place between 25 and 27 June at the Zaslavl Regatta Course.

== Schedule ==
The schedule was as follows:

Date	Time	Round
Tuesday 25 June 2019	14:15	Heats
Tuesday 25 June 2019	17:25	Semifinal
Thursday 27 June 2019	10:20	Final

All times are Further-eastern European Time (UTC+3)

== Results ==
=== Heats ===
The fastest three boats in each heat advanced directly to the final. The next four fastest boats in each heat, plus the fastest remaining boat advanced to the semifinal.

==== Heat 1 ====
Rank	Kayakers	Country	Time	Notes
1	Aliaksei Misiuchenka; Stanislau Daineka; Uladzislau Litvinau; Dzmitry Natynchyk	Belarus	1:18.496	QF, GB
2	Saúl Craviotto; Cristian Toro; Marcus Walz; Rodrigo Germade	Spain	1:19.118	QF
3	Artem Kuzakhmetov; Aleksandr Sergeyev; Oleg Gusev; Vitaly Ershov	Russia	1:19.756	QF
4	Emanuel Silva; João Ribeiro; Messias Baptista; David Varela	Portugal	1:20.393	QS
5	Aurelian Mădălin Ciocan; Florin Ionuţ Vlase; Constantin Mironescu; George Săndulescu	Romania	1:21.733	QS
6	Samuele Burgo; Luca Beccaro; Nicola Ripamonti; Giulio Dressino	Italy	1:47.013	QS

==== Heat 2 ====
Rank	Kayakers	Country	Time	Notes
1	Max Rendschmidt; Ronald Rauhe; Tom Liebscher; Max Lemke	Germany	1:18.869	QF
2	Samuel Baláž; Erik Vlček; Csaba Zalka; Adam Botek	Slovakia	1:19.049	QF
3	Bence Nádas; Sándor Tótka; Balázs Birkás; István Kuli	Hungary	1:19.304	QF
4	Maxime Beaumont; Guillaume Le Floch Decorchemont; Guillaume Burger; Francis Mouget	France	1:21.124	QS
5	Przemysław Korsak; Dawid Putto; Piotr Mazur; Norbert Kurczyński	Poland	1:23.292	QS

=== Semifinal ===
The fastest three boats advanced to the final.

Rank	Kayakers	Country	Time	Notes
1	Emanuel Silva; João Ribeiro; Messias Baptista; David Varela	Portugal	1:20.379	QF
2	Maxime Beaumont; Guillaume Le Floch Decorchemont; Guillaume Burger; Francis Mouget	France	1:20.482	QF
3	Samuele Burgo; Luca Beccaro; Nicola Ripamonti; Giulio Dressino	Italy	1:21.657	QF
4	Aurelian Mădălin Ciocan; Florin Ionuţ Vlase; Constantin Mironescu; George Săndulescu	Romania	1:21.747	
5	Przemysław Korsak; Dawid Putto; Piotr Mazur; Norbert Kurczyński	Poland	1:21.874	

=== Final ===
Competitors in this final raced for positions 1 to 9, with medals going to the top three.

Rank	Kayakers	Country	Time
1st place, gold medalist(s)	Artem Kuzakhmetov; Aleksandr Sergeyev; Oleg Gusev; Vitaly Ershov	Russia	1:32.376
2nd place, silver medalist(s)	Max Rendschmidt; Ronald Rauhe; Tom Liebscher; Max Lemke	Germany	1:32.541
3rd place, bronze medalist(s)	Samuel Baláž; Erik Vlček; Csaba Zalka; Adam Botek	Slovakia	1:33.721
4	Emanuel Silva; João Ribeiro; Messias Baptista; David Varela	Portugal	1:33.976
5	Samuele Burgo; Luca Beccaro; Nicola Ripamonti; Giulio Dressino	Italy	1:34.351
6	Aliaksei Misiuchenka; Stanislau Daineka; Uladzislau Litvinau; Dzmitry Natynchyk	Belarus	1:35.236
7	Bence Nádas; Sándor Tótka; Balázs Birkás; István Kuli	Hungary	1:36.341
8	Maxime Beaumont; Guillaume Le Floch Decorchemont; Guillaume Burger; Francis Mouget	France	1:37.688
9	Saúl Craviotto; Cristian Toro; Marcus Walz; Rodrigo Germade	Spain	1:40.216
