= Canoe sprint at the 2015 European Games – Men's K-2 1000 metres =

Men's K-2 1000 metres at the 2015 European Games
- Venue: Kur Sport and Rowing Centre, Mingachevir
- Date: 14–15 June
- Competitors: 34 from 17 nations
- Winning time: 3:11.681

Medalists
gold medal	Zoltán Kammerer; Tamás Szalai	Hungary
silver medal	Max Rendschmidt; Marcus Gross	Germany
bronze medal	Vitaliy Bialko; Raman Piatrushenka	Belarus

The men's K-2 1000 metres canoe sprint competition at the 2015 European Games in Baku took place between 14 and 15 June at the Kur Sport and Rowing Centre in Mingachevir.

== Schedule ==
The schedule was as follows:

Date	Time	Round
Sunday 14 June 2015	10:31	Heats
Sunday 14 June 2015	16:53	Semifinal
Monday 15 June 2015	10:43	Final

All times are Azerbaijan Summer Time (UTC+5)

== Results ==
=== Heats ===
The fastest three boats in each heat advanced directly to the final. The next four fastest boats in each heat, plus the fastest remaining boat advanced to the semifinal.

==== Heat 1 ====
Rank	Kayakers	Country	Time	Notes
1	Max Rendschmidt; Marcus Gross	Germany	3:13.452	QF, GB
2	Zoltán Kammerer; Tamás Szalai	Hungary	3:13.793	QF
3	Erik Vlček; Juraj Tarr	Slovakia	3:14.468	QF
4	Emanuel Silva; João Ribeiro	Portugal	3:14.726	QS
5	Nicola Ripamonti; Giulio Dressino	Italy	3:17.876	QS
6	Kirill Luchkin; Oleg Zhestkov	Russia	3:18.002	QS
7	Timothy Pendle; Andrew Daniels	Great Britain	3:18.017	QS
8	Simon Blažević; Alan Apollonio	Slovenia	3:18.124	qS
9	Simo Boltić; Vladimir Torubarov	Serbia	3:22.381	

==== Heat 2 ====
Rank	Kayakers	Country	Time	Notes
1	Ričardas Nekriošius; Andrej Olijnik	Lithuania	3:16.020	QF
2	Vitaliy Bialko; Raman Piatrushenka	Belarus	3:16.735	QF
3	Patrik Kucera; Jakub Špicar	Czech Republic	3:17.188	QF
4	Arnaud Hybois; Étienne Hubert	France	3:17.367	QS
5	Jeremy Hakala; Miika Nykänen	Finland	3:18.144	QS
6	Victor Rodríguez; Rubén Millán	Spain	3:22.359	QS
7	Peter Egan; Simas Dobrovolskis	Ireland	3:49.417	QS
8	Igor Trunov; Aleksandr Senkevych	Ukraine	3:54.614	

=== Semifinal ===
The fastest three boats advanced to the final.

Rank	Kayakers	Country	Time	Notes
1	Nicola Ripamonti; Giulio Dressino	Italy	3:08.137	QF, GB
2	Kirill Luchkin; Oleg Zhestkov	Russia	3:08.601	QF
3	Emanuel Silva; João Ribeiro	Portugal	3:08.734	QF
4	Arnaud Hybois; Étienne Hubert	France	3:08.955	
5	Jeremy Hakala; Miika Nykänen	Finland	3:13.568	
6	Victor Rodríguez; Rubén Millán	Spain	3:13.722	
7	Simon Blažević; Alan Apollonio	Slovenia	3:14.501	
8	Timothy Pendle; Andrew Daniels	Great Britain	3:16.984	
9	Peter Egan; Simas Dobrovolskis	Ireland	3:38.587	

=== Final ===
Competitors in this final raced for positions 1 to 9, with medals going to the top three.

Rank	Kayakers	Country	Time
1st place, gold medalist(s)	Zoltán Kammerer; Tamás Szalai	Hungary	3:11.681
2nd place, silver medalist(s)	Max Rendschmidt; Marcus Gross	Germany	3:12.034
3rd place, bronze medalist(s)	Vitaliy Bialko; Raman Piatrushenka	Belarus	3:13.584
4	Erik Vlček; Juraj Tarr	Slovakia	3:13.865
5	Nicola Ripamonti; Giulio Dressino	Italy	3:14.038
6	Ričardas Nekriošius; Andrej Olijnik	Lithuania	3:14.346
7	Kirill Luchkin; Oleg Zhestkov	Russia	3:15.002
8	Patrik Kucera; Jakub Špicar	Czech Republic	3:17.697
9	Emanuel Silva; João Ribeiro	Portugal	3:18.659
