= Canoeing at the 2016 Summer Olympics – Men's K-2 1000 metres =

Men's canoe sprint K-2 1000 metres at the Games of the XXXI Olympiad
- Venue: Lagoa Stadium
- Date: 17–18 August 2016
- Competitors: 24 from 12 nations
- Teams: 12
- Winning time: 3:10.781

Medalists
| 1st place, gold medalist(s) | | Max Rendschmidt; Marcus Gross | Germany |
| 2nd place, silver medalist(s) | | Marko Tomićević; Milenko Zorić | Serbia |
| 3rd place, bronze medalist(s) | | Ken Wallace; Lachlan Tame | Australia |

The men's canoe sprint K-2 1,000 metres at the 2016 Olympic Games in Rio de Janeiro took place between 17 and 18 August at Lagoa Stadium.

The medals were presented by Ivo Ferriani, IOC member, Italy and Helen Brownlee, Board Member of the ICF.

== Competition format ==
The competition comprised heats, semifinals, and a final round. Heat winners advanced to the "A" final, with all other boats getting a second chance in the semifinals. The top three from each semifinal also advanced to the "A" final, and competed for medals. A placing "B" final was held for the other semifinalists.

== Schedule ==
All times are Brasilia Time (UTC-03:00)

== Results ==
=== Heats ===
First boat qualified for the final, remainder go to semifinals.

==== Heat 1 ====
| Rank | Canoer | Country | Time | Notes |
|---|---|---|---|---|
| 1 | Max Rendschmidt; Marcus Gross | Germany | 3:19.258 | Q |
| 2 | Erik Vlček; Juraj Tarr | Slovakia | 3:24.728 | |
| 3 | Tibor Hufnágel; Benjámin Ceiner | Hungary | 3:25.580 | |
| 4 | Arnaud Hybois; Étienne Hubert | France | 3:25.654 | |
| 5 | Jorge Antonio Garcia; Reinier Torres | Cuba | 3:25.711 | |
| 6 | Daniel Havel; Jan Štěrba | Czech Republic | 3:53.907 | |

==== Heat 2 ====
| Rank | Canoer | Country | Time | Notes |
|---|---|---|---|---|
| 1 | Marko Tomićević; Milenko Zorić | Serbia | 3:15.298 | Q |
| 2 | Ken Wallace; Lachlan Tame | Australia | 3:23.019 | |
| 3 | Ričardas Nekriošius; Andrej Olijnik | Lithuania | 3:24.246 | |
| 4 | Emanuel Silva; João Ribeiro | Portugal | 3:26.284 | |
| 5 | Nicola Ripamonti; Giulio Dressino | Italy | 3:30.429 | |
| 6 | Yevgeniy Alexeyev; Alexey Dergunov | Kazakhstan | 3:30.433 | |

=== Semifinals ===
The fastest three canoeists in each semifinal qualify for the 'A' final. The slowest two canoeists in each semifinal qualify for the 'B' final.

==== Semifinal 1 ====
| Rank | Canoer | Country | Time | Notes |
|---|---|---|---|---|
| 1 | Ken Wallace; Lachlan Tame | Australia | 3:16.635 | FA |
| 2 | Nicola Ripamonti; Giulio Dressino | Italy | 3:17.942 | FA |
| 3 | Tibor Hufnágel; Benjámin Ceiner | Hungary | 3:18.474 | FA |
| 4 | Yevgeniy Alexeyev; Alexey Dergunov | Kazakhstan | 3:18.858 | FB |
| 5 | Arnaud Hybois; Étienne Hubert | France | 3:21.100 | FB |

==== Semifinal 2 ====
| Rank | Canoer | Country | Time | Notes |
|---|---|---|---|---|
| 1 | Emanuel Silva; João Ribeiro | Portugal | 3:18.099 | FA |
| 2 | Ričardas Nekriošius; Andrej Olijnik | Lithuania | 3:18.526 | FA |
| 3 | Erik Vlček; Juraj Tarr | Slovakia | 3:19.372 | FA |
| 4 | Daniel Havel; Jan Štěrba | Czech Republic | 3:21.569 | FB |
| 5 | Jorge Antonio Garcia; Reinier Torres | Cuba | 3:23.466 | FB |

=== Finals ===
==== Final B ====
| Rank | Canoer | Country | Time | Notes |
|---|---|---|---|---|
| 1 | Jorge Antonio Garcia; Reinier Torres | Cuba | 3:18.768 | |
| 2 | Arnaud Hybois; Étienne Hubert | France | 3:19.415 | |
| 3 | Yevgeniy Alexeyev; Alexey Dergunov | Kazakhstan | 3:20.827 | |
| 4 | Daniel Havel; Jan Štěrba | Czech Republic | 3:25.966 | |

==== Final A ====
| Rank | Canoer | Country | Time | Notes |
|---|---|---|---|---|
| 1st place, gold medalist(s) | Max Rendschmidt; Marcus Gross | Germany | 3:10.781 | |
| 2nd place, silver medalist(s) | Marko Tomićević; Milenko Zorić | Serbia | 3:10.969 | |
| 3rd place, bronze medalist(s) | Ken Wallace; Lachlan Tame | Australia | 3:12.593 | |
| 4 | Emanuel Silva; João Ribeiro | Portugal | 3:12.889 | |
| 5 | Ričardas Nekriošius; Andrej Olijnik | Lithuania | 3:14.748 | |
| 6 | Nicola Ripamonti; Giulio Dressino | Italy | 3:14.883 | |
| 7 | Tibor Hufnágel; Benjámin Ceiner | Hungary | 3:15.387 | |
| 8 | Erik Vlček; Juraj Tarr | Slovakia | 3:15.916 | |
