= Milenko Zorić =

Serbian canoeist

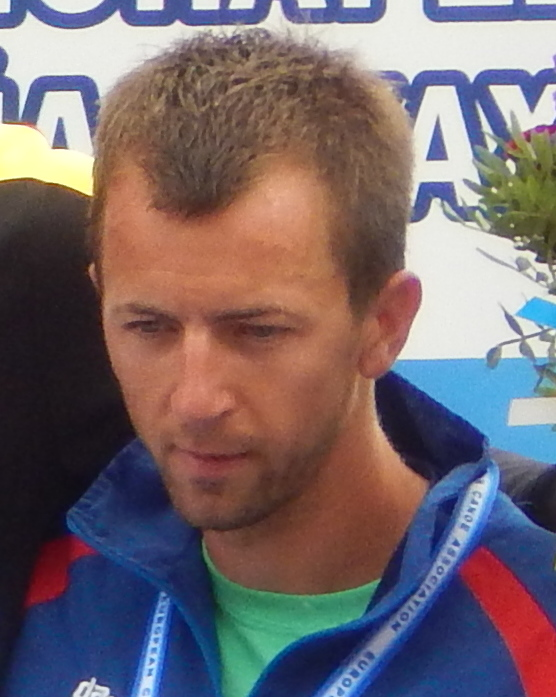
- Zorić in 2016

Personal information
- Nationality: Serbian
- Born: 2 April 1989 (age 37) Sanski Most, SR Bosnia and Herzegovina, SFR Yugoslavia
- Height: 1.79 m (5 ft 10 in)
- Weight: 73 kg (161 lb)

Sport
- Country: Serbia
- Sport: Canoe sprint
Medal record
Men's canoe sprint
Representing Serbia
Olympic Games
| Silver medal – second place | 2016 Rio de Janeiro | K-2 1000 m |
World Championships
| Gold medal – first place | 2017 Račice | K-2 1000 m |
| Bronze medal – third place | 2015 Milan | K-2 1000 m |
| Bronze medal – third place | 2018 Montemor-o-Velho | K-2 1000 m |
European Championships
| Gold medal – first place | 2018 Belgrade | K-2 1000 m |
| Silver medal – second place | 2016 Moscow | K-2 1000 m |
| Silver medal – second place | 2017 Plovdiv | K-2 1000 m |
| Bronze medal – third place | 2012 Zagreb | K-4 1000 m |

Milenko Zorić (Serbian Cyrillic: Миленко Зорић, born 2 April 1989) is a Serbian sprint canoer. A two-time Olympian, Zorić won an Olympic silver medal in the K-2 1000 m event in 2016. A year later he won gold at the World Championships in the same event. He is also the world record holder in the K-2 1000 m event, set at the 2018 Canoe Sprint European Championships. For all three successes he shared a boat with teammate Marko Tomićević.

== Biography ==
Zorić took up canoeing in 1999. He won a bronze medal in the K-4 1000 m event at the 2012 Canoe Sprint European Championships in Zagreb.

At the 2012 Summer Olympics in London, he competed in the K-4 1000 metres event, finishing 9th as part of the Serbia team.

He won a bronze medal in the K-2 1000 m event at the 2015 ICF Canoe Sprint World Championships in Milan with Marko Tomićević.

In June 2016, he and Tomićević finished third behind the boats of Germany and Hungary at the 2016 Canoe Sprint European Championships, held in Moscow. Their bronze medals were later upgraded to silver after Hungarian canoeists Tibor Hufnágel and Bence Dombvári were disqualified and stripped of their awards, following Dombvári testing positive for a doping offence.

At the 2016 Summer Olympics in Rio de Janeiro, Zorić and Tomićević won silver medals in the men's K-2 1000 metres event, finishing second to German pair Max Rendschmidt and Marcus Gross by less than 0.2 seconds. He also competed in the K-4 1000 metres in Rio as part of the Serbia team, which finished 8th.

Zorić and Tomićević became world champions in August 2017: at the ICF Canoe Sprint World Championships, they finished the K-2 1000 metres final in a time of 3 minutes, 8.647 seconds, more than two seconds ahead of the second-placed Slovak boat. In December of that year the pair were named as joint winners of the Sportsman of the Year award in Serbia.

Zorić and Tomićević set a new world record in the final of the 2018 Canoe Sprint European Championships in the K-2 1000 metres event on 9 June 2018, held in Belgrade, as they won the European gold medal for the first time. They were congratulated on Twitter by President of Serbia Aleksandar Vučić and Prime Minister Ana Brnabić for their success.
