= Canoe sprint at the 2015 European Games – Men's K-1 1000 metres =

Men's K-1 1000 metres at the 2015 European Games
- Venue: Kur Sport and Rowing Centre, Mingachevir
- Date: 14–15 June
- Competitors: 31 from 31 nations
- Winning time: 3:28.205

Medalists
gold medal	Max Hoff	Germany
silver medal	Fernando Pimenta	Portugal
bronze medal	René Holten Poulsen	Denmark

The men's K-1 1000 metres canoe sprint competition at the 2015 European Games in Baku took place between 14 and 15 June at the Kur Sport and Rowing Centre in Mingachevir.

== Schedule ==
The schedule was as follows:

Date	Time	Round
Sunday 14 June 2015	09:21	Heats
Sunday 14 June 2015	16:08	Semifinals
Monday 15 June 2015	10:00	Finals

All times are Azerbaijan Summer Time (UTC+5)

== Results ==
=== Heats ===
The six fastest boats in each heat, plus the three fastest remaining boats advanced to the semifinals.

==== Heat 1 ====
Rank	Kayaker	Country	Time	Notes
1	Max Hoff	Germany	3:36.950	QS, GB
2	Fabio Wyss	Switzerland	3:38.626	QS
3	Josef Dostál	Czech Republic	3:38.703	QS
4	Roi Rodríguez	Spain	3:38.990	QS
5	Miika Dietrich	Finland	3:40.061	QS
6	Antun Novaković	Croatia	3:41.575	QS
7	Christoph Kornfeind	Austria	3:51.215	
8	Tamerlan Mustafayev	Azerbaijan	3:58.144	

==== Heat 2 ====
Rank	Kayaker	Country	Time	Notes
1	René Holten Poulsen	Denmark	3:35.606	QS, GB
2	Gábor Bozsik	Turkey	3:38.071	QS
3	Jonathan Boyton	Great Britain	3:38.877	QS
4	Laurens Pannecoucke	Belgium	3:39.673	QS
5	Peter Gelle	Slovakia	3:40.139	QS
6	Giulio Dressino	Italy	3:40.978	QS
7	Daniel Salbu	Norway	3:43.027	qS
8	Andreas Diamantis	Cyprus	3:48.175	qS

==== Heat 3 ====
Rank	Kayaker	Country	Time	Notes
1	Fernando Pimenta	Portugal	3:40.476	QS
2	Marko Tomićević	Serbia	3:41.142	QS
3	Dan Costea	Romania	3:41.776	QS
4	Martin Brzeziński	Poland	3:42.461	QS
5	Jošt Zakrajšek	Slovenia	3:45.367	QS
6	Kyriakos Syriopoulos	Greece	3:51.165	QS
7	Darko Savić	Bosnia and Herzegovina	3:53.614	
8	Konstantin Dejkoski	Macedonia	4:02.329	

==== Heat 4 ====
Rank	Kayaker	Country	Time	Notes
1	Aleh Yurenia	Belarus	3:36.045	QS
2	Cyrille Carré	France	3:37.460	QS
3	Vasily Pogreban	Russia	3:39.410	QS
4	Miroslav Kirchev	Bulgaria	3:43.812	QS
5	Vitaliy Tsurkan	Ukraine	3:44.533	QS
6	László Solti	Hungary	3:44.892	QS
7	Aldis Vilde	Latvia	3:46.228	qS

=== Semifinals ===
The fastest three boats advanced to the A final. The next three fastest boats advanced to the B final.

==== Semifinal 1 ====
Rank	Kayaker	Country	Time	Notes
1	Max Hoff	Germany	3:21.890	QA, WB
2	Miroslav Kirchev	Bulgaria	3:22.861	QA
3	Marko Tomićević	Serbia	3:24.651	QA
4	Gábor Bozsik	Turkey	3:26.322	QB
5	Miika Dietrich	Finland	3:28.064	QB
6	Vasily Pogreban	Russia	3:29.596	QB
7	Jošt Zakrajšek	Slovenia	3:32.307	
8	Daniel Salbu	Norway	3:32.590	
9	Giulio Dressino	Italy	3:45.026	

==== Semifinal 2 ====
Rank	Kayaker	Country	Time	Notes
1	René Holten Poulsen	Denmark	3:23.778	QA
2	Cyrille Carré	France	3:24.237	QA
3	Josef Dostál	Czech Republic	3:25.441	QA*
4	Peter Gelle	Slovakia	3:25.951	QB
5	Roi Rodríguez	Spain	3:25.969	QB
6	Martin Brzeziński	Poland	3:28.718	QB
7	Dan Costea	Romania	3:31.010	
8	László Solti	Hungary	3:33.773	
9	Aldis Vilde	Latvia	3:41.231	

==== Semifinal 3 ====
Rank	Kayaker	Country	Time	Notes
1	Fernando Pimenta	Portugal	3:25.832	QA
2	Aleh Yurenia	Belarus	3:26.596	QA
3	Jonathan Boyton	Great Britain	3:27.898	QA
4	Fabio Wyss	Switzerland	3:29.661	QB
5	Laurens Pannecoucke	Belgium	3:29.689	QB
6	Vitaliy Tsurkan	Ukraine	3:31.925	QB
7	Antun Novaković	Croatia	3:32.120	
8	Andreas Diamantis	Cyprus	3:36.107	
9	Kyriakos Syriopoulos	Greece	3:49.098	

=== Finals ===
==== Final B ====
Competitors in this final raced for positions 10 to 18.

Rank	Kayaker	Country	Time
1	Peter Gelle	Slovakia	3:35.203
2	Roi Rodríguez	Spain	3:35.751
3	Laurens Pannecoucke	Belgium	3:36.092
4	Miika Dietrich	Finland	3:37.298
5	Martin Brzeziński	Poland	3:37.345
6	Fabio Wyss	Switzerland	3:37.377
7	Gábor Bozsik	Turkey	3:37.402
8	Vitaliy Tsurkan	Ukraine	3:40.063
9	Vasily Pogreban	Russia	3:42.691

==== Final A ====
Competitors in this final raced for positions 1 to 9, with medals going to the top three.

Rank	Kayaker	Country	Time
1st place, gold medalist(s)	Max Hoff	Germany	3:28.205
2nd place, silver medalist(s)	Fernando Pimenta	Portugal	3:28.421
3rd place, bronze medalist(s)	René Holten Poulsen	Denmark	3:28.863
4	Miroslav Kirchev	Bulgaria	3:29.248
5	Aleh Yurenia	Belarus	3:30.851
6	Josef Dostál	Czech Republic	3:31.354
7	Cyrille Carré	France	3:33.336
8	Marko Tomićević	Serbia	3:35.132
9	Jonathan Boyton	Great Britain	3:37.036
