= Marko Tomićević =

Serbian canoeist

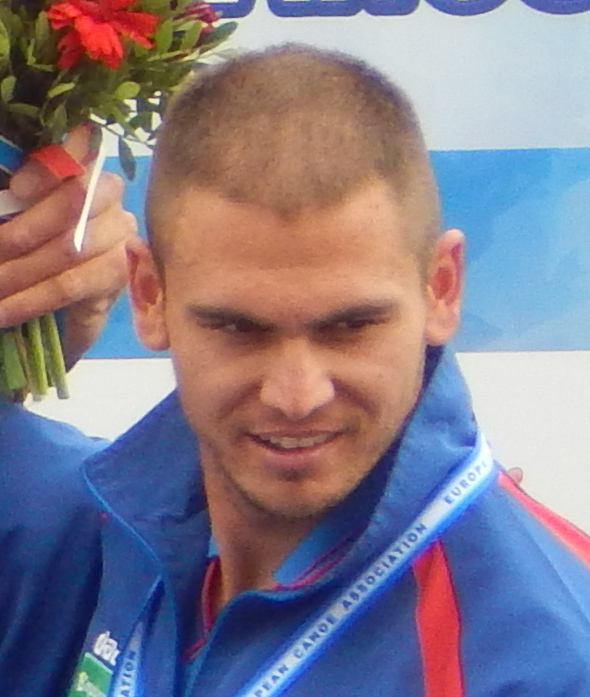
- Tomićević in 2016

Personal information
- Nationality: Serbian
- Born: 19 April 1990 (age 36) Bečej, SR Serbia, Yugoslavia
- Height: 1.65 m (5 ft 5 in)
- Weight: 82 kg (181 lb)

Sport
- Country: Serbia
- Sport: Canoe sprint
- Club: KK Bečej
Medal record
Men's canoe sprint
Representing Serbia
Olympic Games
Silver medal – second place	2016 Rio de Janeiro	K-2 1000 m
World Championships
Gold medal – first place	2017 Račice	K-2 1000 m
Bronze medal – third place	2014 Moscow	K-2 1000 m
Bronze medal – third place	2015 Milan	K-2 1000 m
Bronze medal – third place	2018 Montemor-o-Velho	K-2 1000 m
European Championships
Gold medal – first place	2018 Belgrade	K-2 1000 m
Silver medal – second place	2016 Moscow	K-2 1000 m
Silver medal – second place	2017 Plovdiv	K-2 1000 m
Mediterranean Games
Silver medal – second place	2009 Pescara	K-1 1000 m
European U23 Championships
Bronze medal – third place	2009 Poznań	K-1 1000 m
Bronze medal – third place	2010 Moscow	K-1 500 m
European Junior Championships
Gold medal – first place	2008 Szeged	K-1 1000 m
Gold medal – first place	2008 Szeged	K-1 500 m

Marko Tomićević (Serbian Cyrillic: Марко Томићевић, born 19 April 1990) is a Serbian sprint canoer. A two-time Olympian, Tomićević won an Olympic silver medal in the K-2 1000 m event in 2016. A year later he won gold at the World Championships in the same event. He is also the world record holder in the K-2 1000 m event, set at the 2018 Canoe Sprint European Championships. For all three successes he shared a boat with teammate Milenko Zorić.

== Career ==
Tomićević took part in the 2012 Summer Olympics in London, where he competed in the men's K-1 1000 metres, finishing 10th overall.

At the 2014 ICF Canoe Sprint World Championships, Tomićević partnered with compatriot Vladimir Torubarov in the K–2 1000 metres event, winning bronze medals, the first of the championships for Serbia.

He won a bronze medal in the K-2 1000 m event at the 2015 ICF Canoe Sprint World Championships in Milan with Milenko Zorić.

In June 2016, he and Zorić finished third behind the boats of Germany and Hungary at the 2016 Canoe Sprint European Championships, held in Moscow. Their bronze medals were later upgraded to silver after Hungarian canoeists Tibor Hufnágel and Bence Dombvári were disqualified and stripped of their awards, following Dombvári testing positive for a doping offence.

At the 2016 Summer Olympics in Rio de Janeiro, Tomićević and Zorić won silver medals in the men's K-2 1000 metres event, finishing second to German pair Max Rendschmidt and Marcus Gross by less than 0.2 seconds. He also competed in the K-4 1000 metres in Rio as part of the Serbia team, which finished 8th.

Tomićević and Zorić became world champions in August 2017: at the ICF Canoe Sprint World Championships, they finished the K-2 1000 metres final in a time of 3 minutes, 8.647 seconds, more than two seconds ahead of the second-placed Slovak boat. In December of that year the pair were named as joint winners of the Sportsman of the Year award in Serbia.

Tomićević and Zorić set a new world record in the final of the 2018 Canoe Sprint European Championships in the K-2 1000 metres event on 9 June 2018, held in Belgrade, as they won the European gold medal for the first time. They were congratulated on Twitter by President of Serbia Aleksandar Vučić and Prime Minister Ana Brnabić for their success.
