= 2015 Canoe Sprint European Championships =

International canoeing and kayaking event

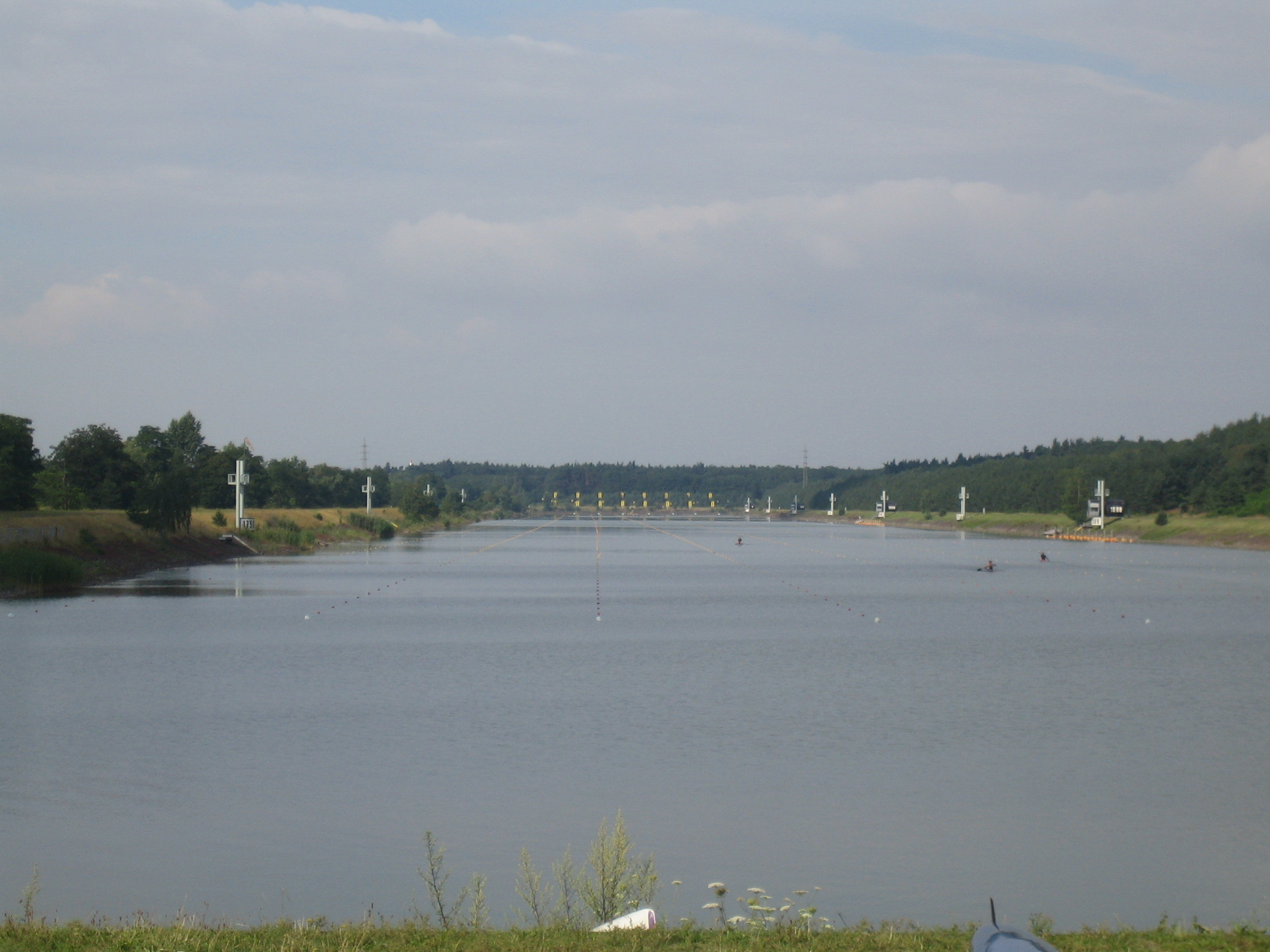
- Venue: Sportcentrum Račice
- Location: Račice, Czech Republic
- Start date: 1 May
- End date: 3 May

The 2015 Canoe Sprint European Championships was the 27th edition of the Canoe Sprint European Championships, an international canoe and kayak sprint event organised by the European Canoe Association, held in Račice, Czech Republic, between 1 and 3 May 2015.

== Medal table ==
* Host nation

Rank	Nation	Gold	Silver	Bronze	Total
1	Germany (GER)	7	3	1	11
2	Russia (RUS)	4	4	3	11
3	Belarus (BLR)	4	3	4	11
4	Poland (POL)	2	3	0	5
5	Denmark (DEN)	2	1	0	3
6	Czech Republic (CZE)*	2	0	1	3
7	Romania (ROM)	1	3	0	4
8	Ukraine (UKR)	1	2	3	6
9	Serbia (SRB)	1	1	5	7
10	France (FRA)	1	0	1	2
11	Bulgaria (BUL)	1	0	0	1
12	Hungary (HUN)	0	2	0	2
13	Italy (ITA)	0	1	2	3
14	Portugal (POR)	0	1	1	2
15	Slovakia (SVK)	0	1	0	1
15	Sweden (SWE)	0	1	0	1
17	Lithuania (LTU)	0	0	2	2
17	Spain (ESP)	0	0	2	2
19	Ireland (IRL)	0	0	1	1
Totals (19 entries)		26	26	26	78

== Medal overview ==
=== Men ===
Event	Gold	Time	Silver	Time	Bronze	Time
C-1 200 m	Andrey Kraitor (RUS)	40.296	Artsem Kozyr (BLR)	40.416	Alfonso Benavides (ESP)	40.636
C-1 500 m	Martin Fuksa (CZE)	1:49.716	Mikhail Pavlov (RUS)	1:50.580	Pavlo Altukhov (UKR)	1:51.248
C-1 1000 m	Sebastian Brendel (GER)	3:55.296	Tomasz Kaczor (POL)	3:56.376	Pavlo Altukhov (UKR)	3:56.460
C-1 5000 m	Sebastian Brendel (GER)	22:58.100	Pavel Petrov (RUS)	23:14.830	Maxim Piatrou (BLR)	23:19.320
C-2 200 m	Russia; Alexey Korovashkov; Ivan Shtyl	36.828	Belarus; Dzmitry Rabchanka; Aleksandr Vauchetskiy	37.980	Italy; Daniele Santini; Luca Incollingo	38.276
C-2 500 m	Russia; Alexey Korovashkov; Ivan Shtyl	1:43.848	Ukraine; Dmytro Ianchuk; Taras Mishchuk	1:45.272	Belarus; Hleb Saladukha; Dzianis Makhlai	1:46.212
C-2 1000 m	Ukraine; Dmytro Ianchuk; Taras Mishchuk	3:36.572	Russia; Alexey Korovashkov; Ilya Pervukhin	3:58.552	Germany; Yul Oeltze; Ronald Verch	3:38.632
C-4 1000 m	Russia; Kirill Shamshurin; Rasul Ismukhamedov; Viktor Melantev; Vladislav Chebotar	3:23.460	Romania; Leonid Carp; Petre Condrat; Josif Chirilă; Stefan Strat	3:24.792	Ukraine; Denys Kovalenko; Elnur Akhadov; Dmytro Ianchuk; Eduard Shemetylo	3:25.412
K-1 200 m	Marko Dragosavljević (SRB)	34.708	Petter Menning (SWE)	34.836	Ignas Navakauskas (LTU)	34.912
K-1 500 m	René Holten Poulsen (DEN)	1:41.504	Tom Liebscher (GER)	1:41.952	Dejan Pajić (SRB)	1:42.168
K-1 1000 m	Max Hoff (GER)	3:33.416	René Holten Poulsen (DEN)	3:35.080	Fernando Pimenta (POR)	3:35.616
K-1 5000 m	René Holten Poulsen (DEN)	20:01.650	Max Hoff (GER)	20:03.290	Aleh Yurenia (BLR)	20:21.560
K-2 200 m	Germany; Ronald Rauhe; Tom Liebscher	32.224	Serbia; Nebojša Grujić; Marko Novaković	32.292	Lithuania; Aurimas Lankas; Edvinas Ramanauskas	32.660
K-2 500 m	Germany; Max Rendschmidt; Marcus Gross	1:31.204	Slovakia; Erik Vlček; Juraj Tarr	1:31.668	Belarus; Vitaliy Bialko; Raman Piatrushenka	1:32.612
K-2 1000 m	Germany; Max Rendschmidt; Marcus Gross	3:19.056	Belarus; Vitaliy Bialko; Raman Piatrushenka	3:19.884	Czech Republic; Daniel Havel; Jan Sterba	3:19.976
K-4 1000 m	Czech Republic; Daniel Havel; Lukáš Trefil; Josef Dostál; Jan Štěrba	2:57.280	Portugal; Fernando Pimenta; João Ribeiro; Emanuel Silva; David Fernandes	2:58.152	Spain; Javier Hernanz; Rodrigo Germade; Oscar Carrera; Íñigo Peña	2:58.572

=== Women ===
Event	Gold	Time	Silver	Time	Bronze	Time
C-1 200 m	Staniliya Stamenova (BUL)	49.796	Zsanett Lakatos (HUN)	51.080	Irina Andreeva (RUS)	51.200
C-2 500 m	Belarus; Daryna Kastsiushenka; Kamila Bobr	2:01.528	Hungary; Zsanett Lakatos; Kincsö Takács	2:03.412	Russia; Irina Andreeva; Olesya Nikiforova	2:07.252
K-1 200 m	Sarah Guyot (FRA)	40.980	Natalia Podolskaya (RUS)	41.340	Nikolina Moldovan (SRB)	41.516
K-1 500 m	Ewelina Wojnarowska (POL)	1:54.552	Franziska Weber (GER)	1:54.968	Sarah Guyot (FRA)	1:55.392
K-1 1000 m	Franziska Weber (GER)	4:02.777	Florentina Caminescu (ROM)	4:03.601	Irene Burgo (ITA)	4:05.645
K-1 5000 m	Maryna Litvinchuk (BLR)	22:19.250	Irene Burgo (ITA)	22:19.680	Jenny Egan (IRL)	22:19.900
K-2 200 m	Belarus; Marharyta Makhneva; Maryna Litvinchuk	38.480	Poland; Karolina Naja; Beata Mikołajczyk	39.192	Serbia; Nikolina Moldovan; Olivera Moldovan	39.420
K-2 500 m	Poland; Karolina Naja; Beata Mikołajczyk	1:45.524	Romania; Petronela Borha; Elena Meroniac	1:45.964	Serbia; Milica Starović; Dalma Ružičić-Benedek	1:46.172
K-2 1000 m	Romania; Petronela Borha; Elena Meroniac	3:42.220	Poland; Karolina Naja; Beata Mikołajczyk	3:42.740	Serbia; Milica Starović; Dalma Ružičić-Benedek	3:43.340
K-4 500 m	Belarus; Marharyta Makhneva; Alexandra Grishina; Volha Khudzenka; Maryna Litvinchuk	1:35.584	Ukraine; Mariia Kichasova; Mariya Povkh; Anastasiia Todorova; Inna Hryshchun	1:37.180	Russia; Elena Anyshina; Kira Stepanova; Vera Sobetova; Svetlana Chernigovskaya	1:37.804

== Paracanoe ==
=== Medal events ===
Non-Paralympic classes

Event	Gold		Silver		Bronze	
Men's K–1 200 m KL1	Great Britain; Ian Marsden	52.844	Italy; Salvatore Ravalli	55.316	Austria; Elmar Sternach	1:09.292
Men's K–1 200 m KL2	Austria; Markus Swoboda	42.520	Russia; Victor Potanin	44.664	Hungary; János Bencze	47.704
Men's K–1 200 m KL3	Great Britain; Robert Oliver	40.880	Germany; Tom Kierey	41.468	Poland; Mateusz Surwilo	42.212
Men's V–1 200 m VL1	Hungary; Róbert Suba	1:03.395	Italy; Andrea Pistritto	1:07.595	France; Cyrille Hureau	1:07.667
Men's V–1 200 m VL2	Spain; Javier Reja Muñoz	53.856	Germany; Ivo Kilian	54.868	Hungary; Miklós Suha	1:06.556
Men's V–1 200 m VL3	Hungary; Dániel Geri	51.992	Russia; Aleksei Egorov	53.064	Great Britain; Martin Tweedie	53.244
Women's K–1 200 m KL1	Great Britain; Jeanette Chippington	57.044	Germany; Edina Müller	1:00.124	Russia; Alexandra Dupik	1:00.276
Women's K–1 200 m KL2	France; Cindy Moreau	51.336	Great Britain; Emma Wiggs	52.232	Russia; Rimma Egorkina	55.592
Women's K–1 200 m KL3	Great Britain; Anne Dickins	53.544	Romania; Mihaela Lulea	56.384	Italy; Veronica Plebani	56.760
Women's V–1 200 m VL1+2	Russia; Nadezda Andreeva (VL2)	1:11.648	Poland; Katarzyna Leskiewicz (VL2)	1:25.252	Poland; Agnieszka Kopec (VL1)	1:35.080
Women's V–1 200 m VL3	Russia; Larisa Volik	1:03.676	Germany; Brit Gottschalk	1:09.324	Spain; Jana Mestre	1:21.448

=== Medal table ===
Rank	Nation	Gold	Silver	Bronze	Total
1	Great Britain	4	1	1	6
2	Hungary	2	0	1	3
3	Austria	1	0	1	2
3	France	1	0	1	2
5	Russia	0	2	2	4
6	Italy	0	2	1	3
7	Germany	0	2	0	2
8	Romania	0	1	0	1
9	Poland	0	0	1	1
Totals (9 entries)		8	8	8	24
