= Denys Kovalenko =

Ukrainian canoeist

Personal information
- Born: 1991 (age 34–35) Pivdenne, Ukraine
Medal record
Men's canoe sprint
Representing Ukraine
World Championships
Silver medal – second place	2015 Milan	C-2 500 m
Bronze medal – third place	2017 Račice	C-4 1000 m
European Championships
Bronze medal – third place	2013 Montemor-o-Velho	C-4 1000 m
Bronze medal – third place	2014 Brandenburg	C-4 1000 m
Bronze medal – third place	2015 Račice	C-4 1000 m

Denys Kovalenko (born 1991) is a Ukrainian sprint canoer. He is a silver medalists of the World Championships and medalist of the European Championships.
