= 2014 Canoe Sprint European Championships =

International canoeing and kayaking event

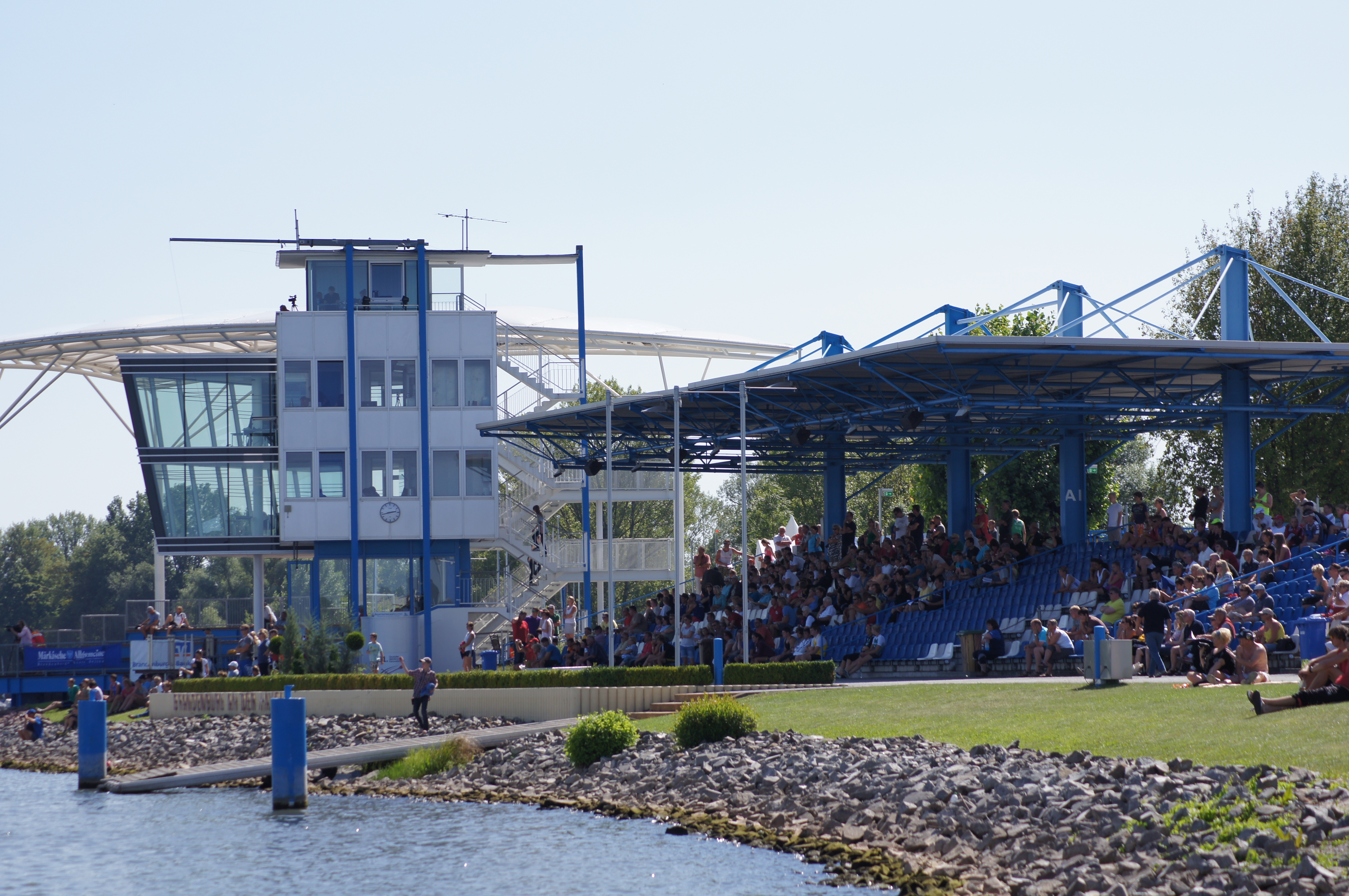
- Venue: Beetzsee
- Location: Brandenburg, Germany
- Start date: 10 July
- End date: 13 July

The 2014 Canoe Sprint European Championships (German: Kanurennsport-Europameisterschaften 2014), was the 26th edition of the Canoe Sprint European Championships, an international canoe and kayak sprint event organised by the European Canoe Association, held in Brandenburg, Germany, between 10 and 13 July 2014.

== Medal table ==
* Host nation (Germany)

Rank	Nation	Gold	Silver	Bronze	Total
1	Hungary (HUN)	8	5	0	13
2	Germany (GER)*	6	3	2	11
3	Belarus (BLR)	4	2	2	8
4	Russia (RUS)	3	2	7	12
5	Czech Republic (CZE)	2	0	1	3
6	Portugal (POR)	1	0	5	6
7	Bulgaria (BUL)	1	0	2	3
8	Serbia (SRB)	1	0	1	2
9	Denmark (DEN)	0	3	0	3
10	Poland (POL)	0	2	1	3
11	France (FRA)	0	2	0	2
12	Great Britain (GBR)	0	1	2	3
13	Romania (ROU)	0	1	1	2
13	Slovakia (SVK)	0	1	1	2
13	Ukraine (UKR)	0	1	1	2
16	Lithuania (LTU)	0	1	0	1
16	Spain (ESP)	0	1	0	1
16	Sweden (SWE)	0	1	0	1
Totals (18 entries)		26	26	26	78

== Medal overview ==
=== Men ===
Event	Gold	Time	Silver	Time	Bronze	Time
C-1 200 m	Alexey Korovashkov (RUS)	42.440	Alfonso Benavides (ESP)	43.033	Hélder Silva (POR)	43.418
C-1 500 m	Martin Fuksa (CZE)	1:50.443	Sebastian Brendel (GER)	1:50.591	Dzianis Harazha (BLR)	1:51.700
C-1 1000 m	Sebastian Brendel (GER)	3:54.822	Attila Vajda (HUN)	3:55.577	Viktor Melantev (RUS)	3:57.676
C-1 5000 m	Sebastian Brendel (GER)	21:48.823	Eduard Shemetylo (UKR)	22:47.687	Pavel Petrov (RUS)	22:53.951
C-2 200 m	Russia; Alexey Korovashkov; Ivan Shtyl	37.570	Germany; Robert Nuck; Stefan Holtz	38.450	Romania; Alexandru Dumitrescu; Victor Mihalachi	39.124
C-2 500 m	Russia; Alexey Korovashkov; Ivan Shtyl	1:41.067	Romania; Alexandru Dumitrescu; Victor Mihalachi	1:43.223	Poland; Tomasz Kaczor; Vincent Slominski	1:43.974
C-2 1000 m	Hungary; Henrik Vasbányai; Róbert Mike	3:31.449	Russia; Alexey Korovashkov; Ilya Pervukhin	3:32.788	Czech Republic; Jaroslav Radoň; Filip Dvořák	3:35.467
C-4 1000 m	Belarus; Dzmitry Rabchanka; Dzmitry Vaitsishkin; Dzianis Harazha; Aleksandr Vauchetskiy	3:17.912	Hungary; András Vass; Tamás Kiss; Pál Sarudi; Dávid Varga	3:19.316	Ukraine; Denys Kovalenko; Elnur Akhadov; Dmytro Ianchuk; Taras Mishchuk	3:20.007
K-1 200 m	Marko Dragosavljević (SRB)	35.841	Ed McKeever (GBR)	36.029	Yury Postrigay (RUS)	36.050
K-1 500 m	Tom Liebscher (GER)	1:40.447	René Holten Poulsen (DEN)	1:41.382	Miroslav Kirchev (BUL)	1:42.155
K-1 1000 m	Aleh Yurenia (BLR)	3:27.455	René Holten Poulsen (DEN)	3:28.711	Max Hoff (GER)	3:30.388
K-1 5000 m	Max Hoff (GER)	19:47.102	René Holten Poulsen (DEN)	19:48.893	Fernando Pimenta (POR)	19:54.713
K-2 200 m	Germany; Ronald Rauhe; Tom Liebscher	31.797	Lithuania; Aurimas Lankas; Edvinas Ramanauskas	32.527	Great Britain; Liam Heath; Jonathan Schofield	32.617
K-2 500 m	Portugal; Emanuel Silva; João Ribeiro	1:31.030	France; Sébastien Jouve; Maxime Beaumont	1:31.342	Belarus; Raman Piatrushenka; Vadzim Makhneu	1:31.378
K-2 1000 m	Germany; Max Rendschmidt; Marcus Gross	3:06.792	France; Arnaud Hybois; Étienne Hubert	3:07.306	Slovakia; Erik Vlček; Juraj Tarr	3:07.905
K-4 1000 m	Czech Republic; Daniel Havel; Josef Dostál; Lukáš Trefil; Jan Štěrba	2:54.824	Slovakia; Marek Krajkovic; Matej Michálek; Gábor Jakubík; Viktor Demin	2:55.179	Portugal; Fernando Pimenta; Emanuel Silva; João Ribeiro; David Fernandes	2:56.932

=== Women ===
Event	Gold	Time	Silver	Time	Bronze	Time
C-1 200 m	Staniliya Stamenova (BUL)	48.702	Zsanett Lakatos (HUN)	50.030	Irina Andreeva (RUS)	50.634
C-2 500 m	Hungary; Zsanett Lakatos; Kincsö Takács	2:05.875	Belarus; Daryna Kastsiushenka; Volha Klimava	2:06.084	Russia; Natalia Marasanova; Olesia Romasenko	2:10.988
K-1 200 m	Danuta Kozák (HUN)	43.103	Elena Terekhova (RUS)	43.533	Teresa Portela (POR)	43.722
K-1 500 m	Danuta Kozák (HUN)	1:51.057	Franziska Weber (GER)	1:52.300	Teresa Portela (POR)	1:52.760
K-1 1000 m	Tamara Csipes (HUN)	3:56.643	Sofia Paldanius (SWE)	3:56.700	Anastasiya Kharitonova (RUS)	3:58.292
K-1 5000 m	Erika Medveczky (HUN)	21:59.990	Maryna Litvinchuk (BLR)	22:06.442	Berenike Faldum (BUL)	22:08.019
K-2 200 m	Belarus; Marharyta Tsishkevich; Maryna Litvinchuk	38.208	Hungary; Anna Kárász; Ninetta Vad	38.264	Great Britain; Jessica Walker; Angela Hannah	38.289
K-2 500 m	Hungary; Gabriella Szabó; Tamara Csipes	1:43.897	Poland; Karolina Naja; Beata Mikołajczyk	1:44.464	Serbia; Nikolina Moldovan; Olivera Moldovan	1:44.565
K-2 1000 m	Belarus; Sofiya Yurchanka; Aleksandra Grishina	3:35.225	Hungary; Erika Medveczky; Alíz Sarudi	3:37.363	Germany; Sabrina Hering; Steffi Kriegerstein	3:37.474
K-4 500 m	Hungary; Gabriella Szabó; Danuta Kozák; Anna Kárász; Ninetta Vad	1:30.847	Poland; Marta Walczykiewicz; Ewelina Wojnarowska; Karolina Naja; Beata Mikołajczyk	1:31.926	Russia; Elena Anyshina; Kira Stepanova; Vera Sobetova; Natalia Lobova	1:32.366

== Paracanoe ==
=== Medal events ===
Non-Paralympic classes

Event	Gold	Silver	Bronze
Men's K–1 200 m KL1			
Men's K–1 200 m KL2			
Men's K–1 200 m KL3			
Men's V–1 200 m VL1			
Men's V–1 200 m VL2			
Men's V–1 200 m VL3			
Women's K–1 200 m KL1			
Women's K–1 200 m KL2			
Women's K–1 200 m KL3			
Women's V–1 200 m VL1			
Women's V–1 200 m VL2			
Women's V–1 200 m VL3			
