= Canoeing at the 2008 Summer Olympics – Men's K-1 1000 metres =

The men's K-1 1000 metres competition in canoeing at the 2008 Summer Olympics took place at the Shunyi Olympic Rowing-Canoeing Park in Beijing on 22 August. The K-1 event is raced in single-person kayaks.

Competition consists of three rounds: the heats, the semifinals, and the final. All boats compete in the heats. The top finisher in each of the three heats advances directly to the final, while the next six finishers (places 2 through 7) in each heat move on to the semifinals. The top three finishers in each of the two semifinals join the heats winners in the final.

== Schedule ==
All times are China Standard Time (UTC+8)

Date	Time	Round
Monday, August 18, 2008	15:30-16:00	Heats
Wednesday, August 20, 2008	15:30-15:50	Semifinals
Friday, August 22, 2008	15:30-15:45	Final

== Medalists ==
Gold	Silver	Bronze
Tim Brabants (GBR)	Eirik Verås Larsen (NOR)	Ken Wallace (AUS)

== Results ==
=== Heats ===
Qualification Rules: 1->Final, 2..7->Semifinals, Rest Out

==== Heat 1 ====
Rank	Athletes	Country	Time	Notes
1	Tim Brabants	Great Britain	3:27.828	QF
2	Zoltán Benkő	Hungary	3:29.542	QS
3	Markus Oscarsson	Sweden	3:30.044	QS
4	Emanuel Silva	Portugal	3:31.843	QS
5	Shaun Rubenstein	South Africa	3:36.134	QS
6	Dmitriy Torlopov	Kazakhstan	3:39.671	QS
7	Manuel Cortina Martínez	Mexico	3:41.433	QS
8	Myint Tayzar Phone	Myanmar	3:53.578	
9	Assane Dame Fall	Senegal	4:07.061	

==== Heat 2 ====
Rank	Athletes	Country	Time	Notes
1	Adam van Koeverden	Canada	3:29.622	QF
2	Stjepan Janić	Croatia	3:31.369	QS
3	Ben Fouhy	New Zealand	3:33.037	QS
4	Jernej Zupancic Regent	Slovenia	3:33.289	QS
5	Michael Kolganov	Israel	3:38.207	QS
6	Rami Zur	United States	3:38.693	QS
7	Jorge Garcia	Cuba	3:38.866	QS
8	Kotoua Francis Abia	Ivory Coast	4:14.411	
9	Alcino Silva	São Tomé and Príncipe	4:28.057	

==== Heat 3 ====
Rank	Athletes	Country	Time	Notes
1	Eirik Verås Larsen	Norway	3:29.043	QF
2	Ken Wallace	Australia	3:30.306	QS
3	Max Hoff	Germany	3:30.316	QS
4	Anton Ryakhov	Russia	3:38.381	QS
5	Pan Yao	China	3:40.774	QS
6	Miguel Correa	Argentina	3:45.695	QS
7	Rudolph Berking-Williams	Samoa	4:00.784	QS
8	Tony Lespoir	Seychelles	4:05.890	

=== Semifinals ===
Qualification Rules: 1..3->Final, Rest Out

==== Semifinal 1 ====
Rank	Athletes	Country	Time	Notes
1	Ken Wallace	Australia	3:33.255	QF
2	Ben Fouhy	New Zealand	3:33.542	QF
3	Markus Oscarsson	Sweden	3:33.906	QF
4	Shaun Rubenstein	South Africa	3:36.969	
5	Anton Ryakhov	Russia	3:37.017	
6	Jernej Zupancic Regent	Slovenia	3:41.730	
7	Rami Zur	United States	3:46.204	
8	Dmitriy Torlopov	Kazakhstan	3:47.212	
9	Rudolph Berking-Williams	Samoa	4:04.658	

==== Semifinal 2 ====
Rank	Athletes	Country	Time	Notes
1	Max Hoff	Germany	3:32.847	QF
2	Stjepan Janić	Croatia	3:33.942	QF
3	Zoltán Benkő	Hungary	3:34.473	QF
4	Emanuel Silva	Portugal	3:34.508	
5	Jorge Garcia	Cuba	3:41.219	
6	Pan Yao	China	3:41.539	
7	Manuel Cortina Martínez	Mexico	3:43.017	
8	Michael Kolganov	Israel	3:43.108	
9	Miguel Correa	Argentina	3:51.715	

=== Final ===
Rank	Athletes	Country	Time	Notes
Gold medal	Tim Brabants	Great Britain	3:26.323	
Silver medal	Eirik Verås Larsen	Norway	3:27.342	
Bronze medal	Ken Wallace	Australia	3:27.485	
4	Ben Fouhy	New Zealand	3:29.193	
5	Max Hoff	Germany	3:29.391	
6	Markus Oscarsson	Sweden	3:30.198	
7	Stjepan Janić	Croatia	3:30.495	
8	Adam van Koeverden	Canada	3:31.793	
9	Zoltán Benkő	Hungary	3:32.120	
