= Ronald Rauhe =

German canoeist (born 1981)

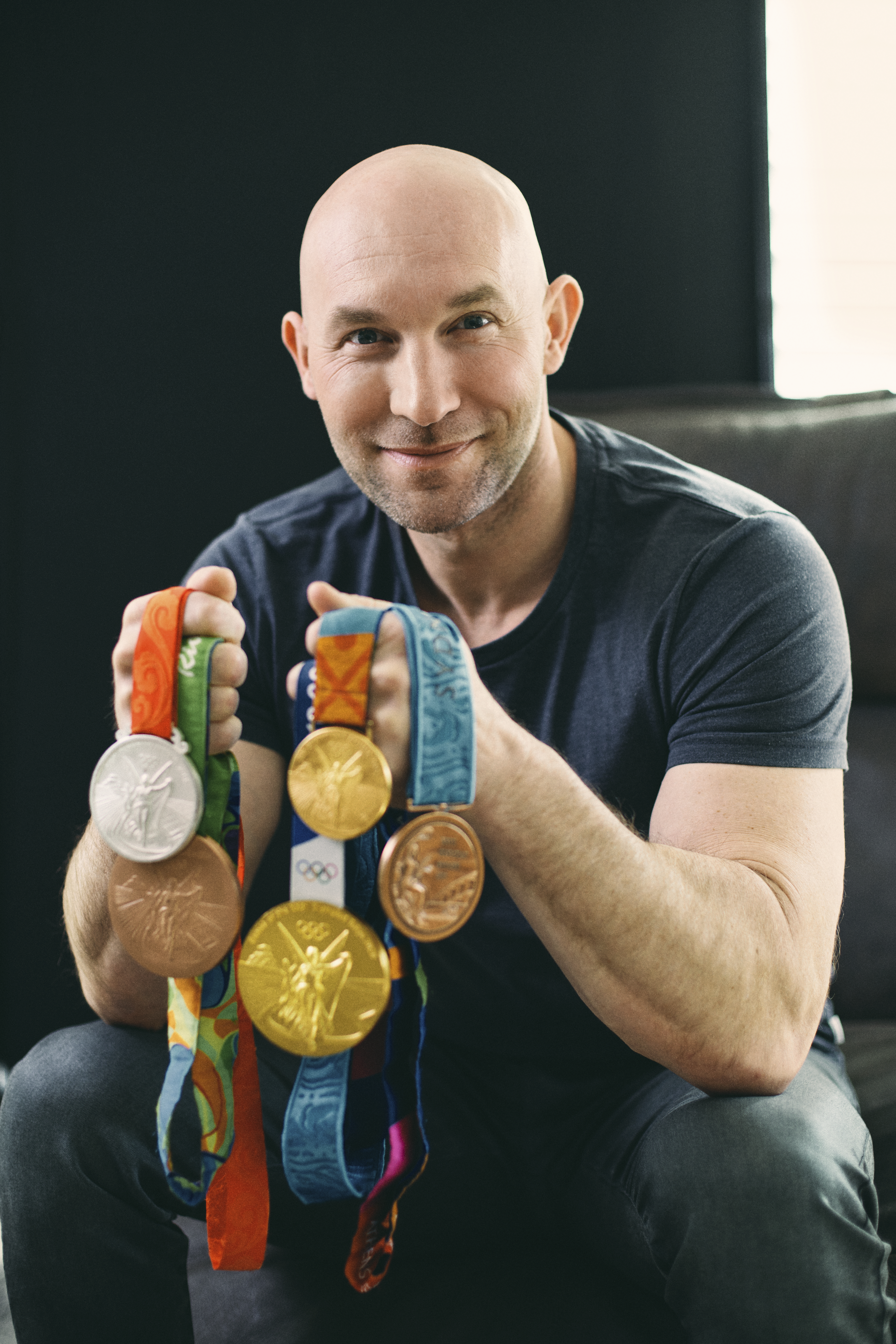
- Rauhe in 2022

Personal information
- Nationality: German
- Born: 3 October 1981 (age 44) West Berlin, West Germany
- Height: 1.79 m (5 ft 10 in)
- Weight: 82 kg (181 lb)

Sport
- Country: Germany
- Sport: Sprint kayak
- Events: K-1 200 m, K-1 500 m, K-2 500 m, K-4 500 m
- Club: KC Potsdam
Medal record
Men's canoe sprint
Representing Germany
Olympic Games
Gold medal – first place	2004 Athens	K-2 500 m
Gold medal – first place	2020 Tokyo	K-4 500 m
Silver medal – second place	2008 Beijing	K-2 500 m
Bronze medal – third place	2000 Sydney	K-2 500 m
Bronze medal – third place	2016 Rio de Janeiro	K-1 200 m
World Championships
Gold medal – first place	2001 Poznań	K-1 200 m
Gold medal – first place	2001 Poznań	K-2 500 m
Gold medal – first place	2002 Seville	K-1 200 m
Gold medal – first place	2002 Seville	K-2 500 m
Gold medal – first place	2003 Gainesville	K-1 200 m
Gold medal – first place	2003 Gainesville	K-2 500 m
Gold medal – first place	2005 Zagreb	K-2 500 m
Gold medal – first place	2006 Szeged	K-1 200 m
Gold medal – first place	2006 Szeged	K-2 200 m
Gold medal – first place	2006 Szeged	K-2 500 m
Gold medal – first place	2007 Duisburg	K-2 500 m
Gold medal – first place	2009 Dartmouth	K-1 200 m
Gold medal – first place	2009 Dartmouth	K-1 500 m
Gold medal – first place	2017 Račice	K-4 500 m
Gold medal – first place	2018 Montemor-o-Velho	K-4 500 m
Gold medal – first place	2019 Szeged	K-4 500 m
Silver medal – second place	2001 Poznań	K-2 200 m
Silver medal – second place	2007 Duisburg	K-2 200 m
Silver medal – second place	2009 Dartmouth	K-1 4 x 200 m
Silver medal – second place	2010 Poznań	K-1 200 m
Silver medal – second place	2014 Moscow	K-2 200 m
Bronze medal – third place	1999 Milan	K-1 200 m
Bronze medal – third place	2002 Seville	K-2 200 m
Bronze medal – third place	2003 Gainesville	K-2 200 m
Bronze medal – third place	2011 Szeged	K-1 200 m
Bronze medal – third place	2013 Duisburg	K–2 200 m
European Games
Silver medal – second place	2019 Minsk	K-4 500 m
European Championships
Gold medal – first place	2000 Poznań	K-2 500 m
Gold medal – first place	2001 Milan	K-1 200 m
Gold medal – first place	2001 Milan	K-2 200 m
Gold medal – first place	2001 Milan	K-2 500 m
Gold medal – first place	2002 Szeged	K-1 200 m
Gold medal – first place	2002 Szeged	K-2 500 m
Gold medal – first place	2004 Poznań	K-1 200 m
Gold medal – first place	2004 Poznań	K-2 500 m
Gold medal – first place	2005 Poznań	K-2 500 m
Gold medal – first place	2006 Račice	K-1 200 m
Gold medal – first place	2006 Račice	K-2 200 m
Gold medal – first place	2006 Račice	K-2 500 m
Gold medal – first place	2007 Pontevedra	K-2 500 m
Gold medal – first place	2008 Milan	K-2 500 m
Gold medal – first place	2014 Brandenburg	K-2 200 m
Gold medal – first place	2015 Račice	K-2 200 m
Gold medal – first place	2021 Poznań	K-4 500 m
Silver medal – second place	2002 Szeged	K-2 200 m
Silver medal – second place	2005 Poznań	K-2 200 m
Silver medal – second place	2007 Pontevedra	K-2 200 m
Silver medal – second place	2009 Brandenburg	K-1 500 m
Silver medal – second place	2009 Brandenburg	K-1 4×200 m
Silver medal – second place	2010 Trasona	K-1 200 m
Silver medal – second place	2012 Zagreb	K-2 200 m
Silver medal – second place	2013 Montemor-o-Velho	K-2 200 m
Silver medal – second place	2018 Belgrade	K-4 500 m
Bronze medal – third place	2016 Moscow	K-2 200 m
Bronze medal – third place	2017 Plovdiv	K-2 200 m

Ronald Rauhe (born 3 October 1981) is a German sprint canoeist who has competed since 1997. Competing in six Summer Olympics, he won a complete set of medals in the K-2 500 m event (gold: 2004, silver: 2008, bronze: 2000). Rauhe has won 16 world championship gold medals, the most by a male kayaker; now with 26 World medals, in 2011 he exceeded the 20 of his compatriot, Torsten Gutsche.

== Early career ==
Rauhe was selected for the 1997 World Junior Championships in Lahti, Finland at the age of just fifteen years nine months. Competing against paddlers up to three years older he won two medals – gold in the K-4 500 m and silver in the K-1 500 m, an unprecedented achievement for a fifteen-year-old. After winning three more gold medals at the next edition of the world junior championships in Zagreb, Croatia, in 1999 he stepped up to the senior German national team.

== Senior career ==
At the age of seventeen, he enjoyed immediate success, taking the bronze medal in the men's K-1 200 m World Championship final the same year.

Since 2000, the Rauhe/Wieskötter partnership has enjoyed unrivalled success, winning the major K-2 500 m race from 2001 to 2007 (six world titles and the 2004 Olympic gold). The pair have also won eight straight European championships over 500 m (2000–2008; there was no championship in 2003).

Rauhe also dominated the K-1 200 m individual sprint, winning three consecutive golds in both the world and European championships before losing out to Spain's Carlos Pérez in 2005.

If Rauhe's rivals hoped this marked the beginning of a decline in the German's fortunes they were to be disappointed. In 2006 Rauhe was back on top form and won more titles than ever before. At the European Championships in Račice, Czech Republic he won three gold medals, retaining his K-2 500 m title, regaining the K-1 200 m crown from Pérez and winning the K-2 200 m for the first time in his career.

These three victories were repeated at the World Championships in Szeged, Hungary. Rauhe's dominance was best illustrated by his victory in the K-2 200 m final in a race that was scheduled just twenty minutes after his K-1 final (and against a field of rested opponents none of whom had competed in the earlier race).

At the World Championships in his home country Germany in 2007, he and his partner Tim Wieskötter won again the K-2 500 m and came second in the K-2 200 m.

On the national level, he has won 50 national titles at the German Championships. His 50th title was the 500 m in the K-1 on 2 May 2009 in Duisburg.

In June 2015, he competed in the inaugural European Games, for Germany in canoe sprint, more specifically, Men's K-2 200m with Tom Liebscher. He earned a silver medal.

At the 2016 Summer Olympics, he won the bronze medal in the K-1 200 metres event, recording the same time (to a thousandth of a second) as Saúl Craviotto – wiping out the memory of his greatest competitive disappointment, finishing last in the final heat of this event four years previously at the London Olympics.

In 2026, Rauhe has been appointed German Minister of State for Sport and Volunteering.
