= Lachlan Tame =

Australian canoe sprinter (born 1988)

Personal information
- Born: 14 November 1988 (age 38) Gosford, New South Wales
- Height: 1.76 m (5 ft 9 in)
- Weight: 80 kg (176 lb)

Sport
- Partner: Ken Wallace
- Coached by: Jimmy Owens (2013 – current)
Medal record
Men's canoe sprint
Representing Australia
Olympic Games
Bronze medal – third place	2016 Rio de Janeiro	K-2 1000 m
World Championships
Gold medal – first place	2015 Milan	K-2 500 m
Silver medal – second place	2014 Moscow	K-2 1000 m
Silver medal – second place	2015 Milan	K-2 1000 m

Lachlan Tame (born 14 November 1988) is an Australian canoe sprinter. Tame teamed up with Jordan Wood, Murray Stewart and Riley Fitzsimmons in the men's K-4 500m at the 2020 Tokyo Olympics. The team came second in their heat with a time of 1.22:662. In their semi-final they rowed quite a bit slower but still managed to come second and qualify for the final. They couldn't keep up their good form and came sixth in the final, nearly 3 seconds behind the eventual winner, Germany.

== Early years ==
Tame joined the Avoca Beach SLSC as a five-year-old. He has the nickname ‘Lachie' He began ski paddling at the age of 18. He always had ambitions of qualifying for Olympic Games.

Tame won the single ski event at the 2011 Australian Surf Life Saving Championships. In 2014 he partnered with Beijing 2008 Olympics gold medalist Ken Wallace to win the World Championships silver in the K2 1000 metres.

== Achievements ==
Tame won the bronze medal at the 2016 Summer Olympics at Rio de Janeiro in the K2 1000m alongside Olympic champion Ken Wallace.

Based at the Avoca surf club, Tame had a $5000 bet with a mate that he could not make the London Olympics.

Tame was inducted into the Surf Life Saving Australia Hall of Fame in 2015. Widely considered as the most dominant ski paddler of his generation, Tame won four consecutive single ski, two lifesaver relays a double ski and a ski relay titles at the Australian Surf-Lifesaving Championships.

He is a two time member of the Australian Surf Life Saving Team and a three time member of the Australian Men's Kayak Team.

- K2 500m World Champion, 2015 Milan, with Ken Wallace
- 2x K2 1000m Silver Medalist at the World Championships, 2014 Russia, 2015 Milan, with Ken Wallace
