= Marcus Gross =

German canoeist

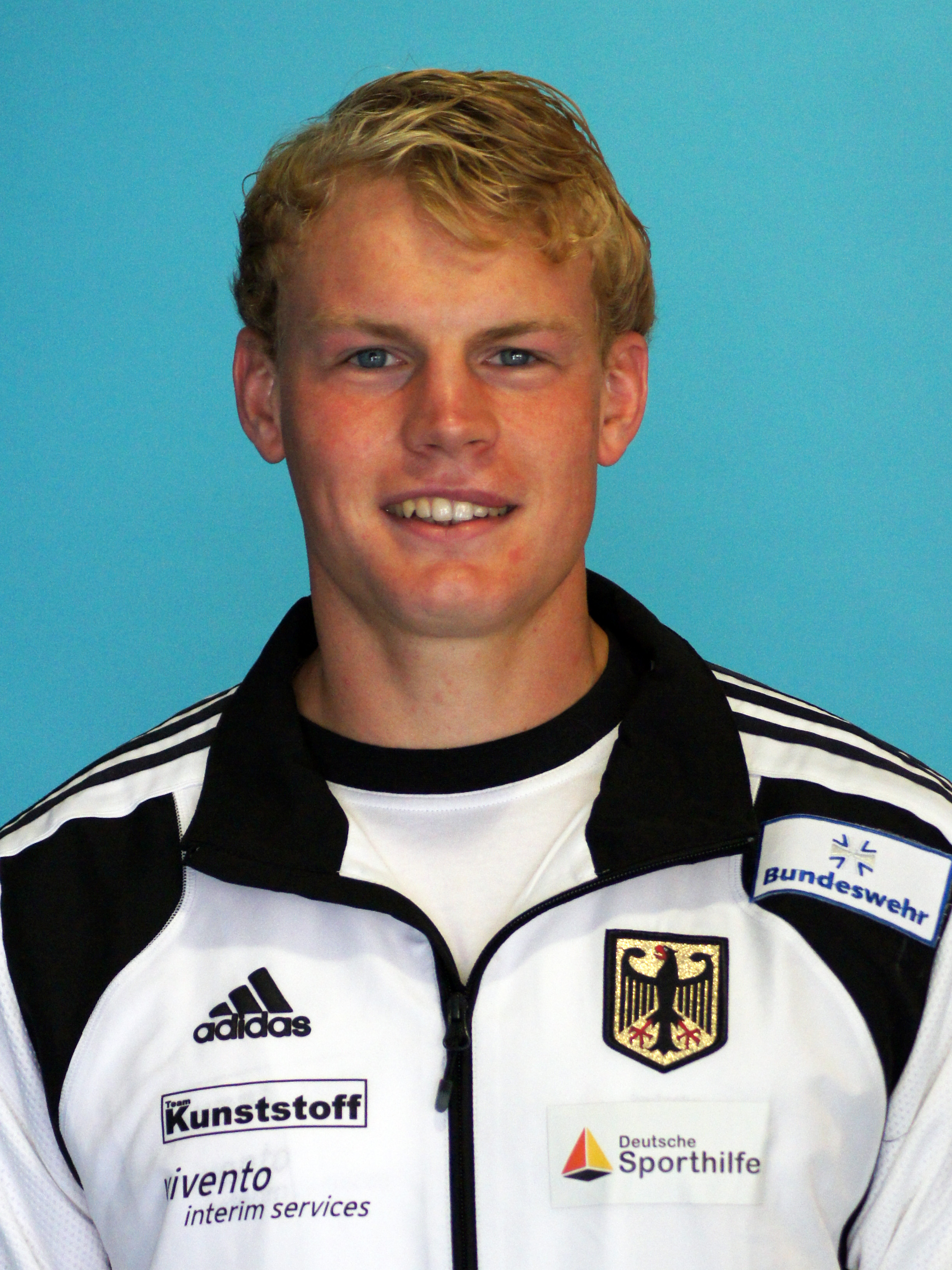
- Gross in 2012

Personal information
- Nationality: German
- Born: 28 September 1989 (age 36) Görlitz, East Germany
- Height: 1.82 m (6 ft 0 in)
- Weight: 85 kg (187 lb)

Sport
- Country: Germany
- Sport: Sprint kayak
- Events: K-2 500 m, K-2 1000 m, K-4 1000 m
- Club: Ruder-und Kanu-Verein 1928 Berlin
Medal record
Men's sprint
Representing Germany
Event	1st	2nd	3rd
Olympic Games	2	0	0
World Championships	3	0	2
European Games	0	1	0
European Championships	8	2	1
Total	13	3	3
Olympic Games
Gold medal – first place	2016 Rio de Janeiro	K-2 1000 m
Gold medal – first place	2016 Rio de Janeiro	K-4 1000 m
World Championships
Gold medal – first place	2013 Duisburg	K-2 1000 m
Gold medal – first place	2015 Milan	K-2 1000 m
Gold medal – first place	2018 Montemor-o-Velho	K-2 1000 m
Bronze medal – third place	2009 Dartmouth	K-2 500 m
Bronze medal – third place	2019 Szeged	K-2 500 m
European Games
Silver medal – second place	2015 Baku	K-2 1000 m
European Championships
Gold medal – first place	2010 Trasona	K-4 1000 m
Gold medal – first place	2013 Montemor-o-Velho	K-2 500 m
Gold medal – first place	2013 Montemor-o-Velho	K-2 1000 m
Gold medal – first place	2014 Brandenburg	K-2 1000 m
Gold medal – first place	2015 Račice	K-2 500 m
Gold medal – first place	2015 Račice	K-2 1000 m
Gold medal – first place	2016 Moscow	K-2 1000 m
Gold medal – first place	2017 Plovdiv	K-2 1000 m
Silver medal – second place	2011 Belgrade	K-4 1000 m
Silver medal – second place	2018 Belgrade	K-2 1000 m
Bronze medal – third place	2009 Brandenburg	K-2 500 m

Marcus Gross (born 28 September 1989) is a German canoeist who has competed since the late 2000s.

He won a bronze medal in the K-2 500 m event at the 2009 ICF Canoe Sprint World Championships in Dartmouth. At the 2012 Summer Olympics, he competed in the Men's K-4 1000 metres, finishing in 4th place with the team in the final. Gross teamed up with Max Rendschmidt to win the K-2 1000m at the 2013 World Championships and the 2013 European Championships. They defended their European title in 2014. In June 2015, he competed in the inaugural European Games, for Germany in canoe sprint, more specifically, Men's K-2 1000m with Max Rendschmidt. He earned a silver medal. The team also won the K2 500 m at the 2015 European Championships. At the 2015 World Championships, Gross and Rendschmidt won the men's K-2 1000m. Gross marked the occasion by proposing to his girlfriend.

He represented his country also at the 2016 Summer Olympics and won two gold medals, in K-2 1000 metres and K-4 1000 m events. In the K-2 1000 metres he competed with Max Rendschmidt, while the K-4 team consisted of Gross, Rendschmidt, Tom Liebscher and Max Hoff. That year Gross and Hoff also won the European K2 1000 m event. In 2017, they retained the European title.

Having missed out on the title at the 2017 World Championships, Gross and Hoff won the K2 1000 m at the 2018 World Championships. At the 2018 European Championships, Gross and Hoff won a silver medal in the K2 1000 m.
