= Artem Kuzakhmetov =

Russian canoeist (born 1995)

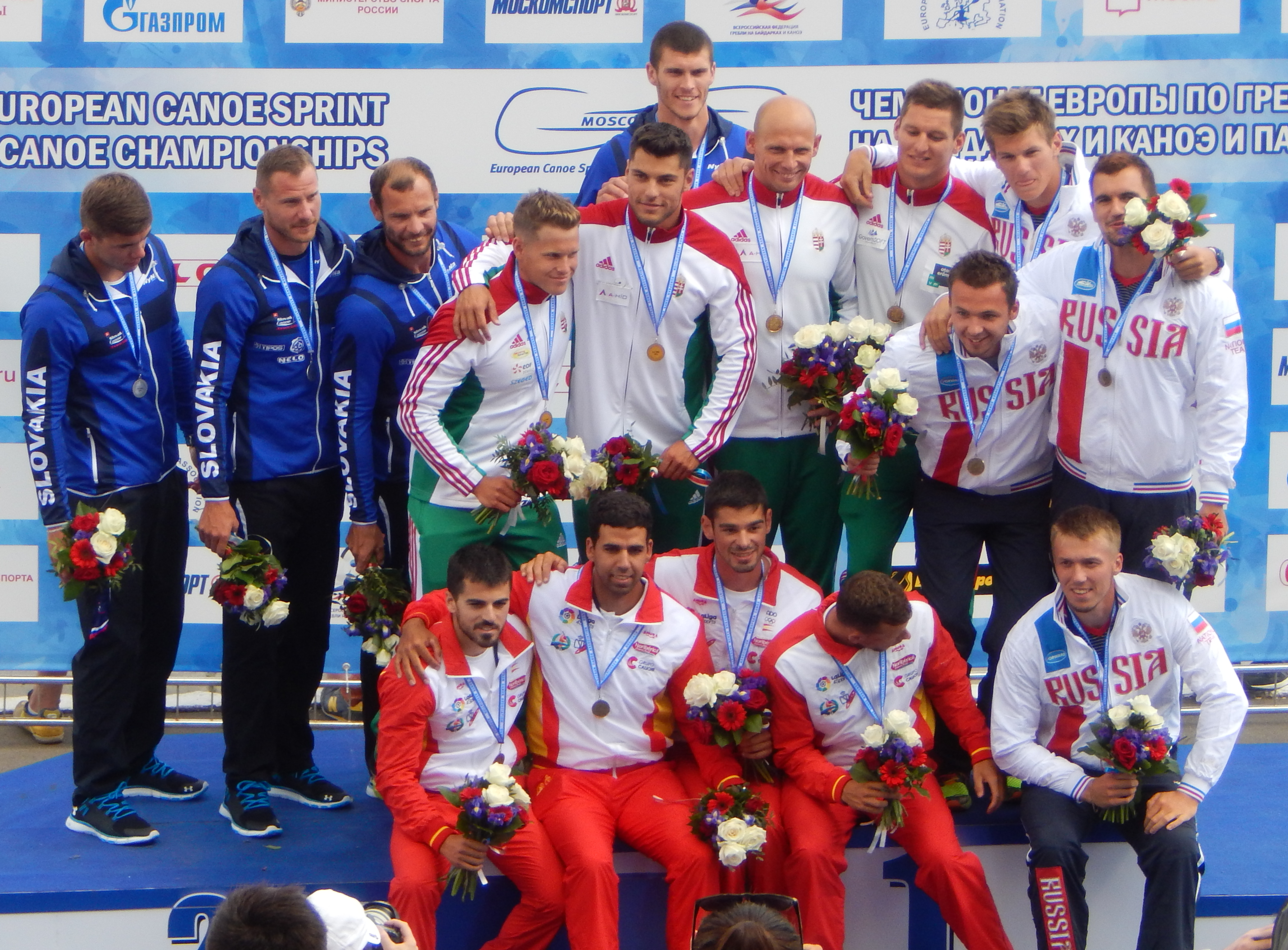

Personal information
- Nationality: Russian
- Born: February 19, 1995 (age 31)

Sport
- Country: Russia
- Sport: Canoe sprint
- Event: Kayaking
Medal record
Men's canoe sprint
Representing Russia
World Championships
Gold medal – first place	2018 Montemor-o-Velho	K-2 500 m
European Games
Gold medal – first place	2019 Minsk	K-4 500 m
European Championships
Bronze medal – third place	2016 Moscow	K-4 500 m

Artem Igorevich Kuzakhmetov (Russian: Артём Игоревич Кузахметов; born 19 February 1995) is a Russian sprint canoeist.

He participated at the 2018 ICF Canoe Sprint World Championships.
