= Ken Wallace (canoeist) =

Australian canoeist (born 1983)

Ken Wallace OAM
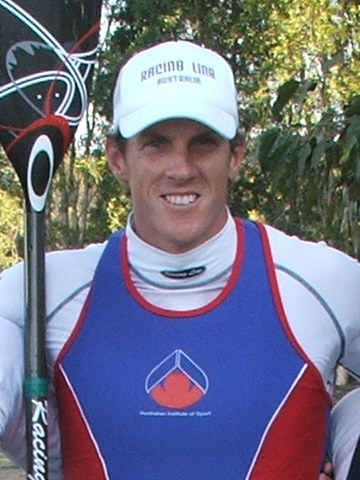
- Wallace in 2008

Personal information
- Full name: Kenneth Maxwell Wallace
- Nickname: Kenny
- Nationality: Australian
- Born: 26 July 1983 (age 43) Gosford, New South Wales
- Years active: 1999 - 2020
- Height: 190 cm (6 ft 3 in)
- Weight: 91 kg (201 lb)

Sport
- Sport: Surf Life Saving, Sprint Canoe
- Club: Tugun Surf Life Saving Club, Currumbin Creek Canoe Club
- Team: Australian Olympic Team
- Partner: Lachlan Tame
- Former partner: David Smith Riley Fitzsimmons Jordan Wood Jacob Clear
- Coached by: Jimmy Owens (2000 – current)

Achievements and titles
- Olympic finals: Beijing 2008 - K1 1000m & 500m London 2012 - K2 1000m Rio 2016 - K2 1000 & K4 1000m
Medal record
Men's canoe sprint
Representing Australia
Olympic Games
Gold medal – first place	2008 Beijing	K-1 500 m
Bronze medal – third place	2008 Beijing	K-1 1000 m
Bronze medal – third place	2016 Rio de Janeiro	K-2 1000 m
World Championships
Gold medal – first place	2001 Curitiba	K-1 1000 m
Gold medal – first place	2010 Poznań	K-1 5000 m
Gold medal – first place	2013 Duisburg	K-1 5000 m
Gold medal – first place	2014 Moscow	K-1 5000 m
Gold medal – first place	2015 Milan	K-1 5000 m
Gold medal – first place	2015 Milan	K-2 500 m
Gold medal – first place	2017 Racice	K-4 1000 m
Silver medal – second place	2013 Duisburg	K-1 1000 m
Silver medal – second place	2014 Moscow	K-2 1000 m
Silver medal – second place	2015 Milan	K-2 1000 m
Bronze medal – third place	2009 Dartmouth	K-1 500 m
- Updated on 18 July 2018

Kenneth Maxwell Wallace (born 26 July 1983) is an Australian sprint canoeist who has competed since the mid-2000s, winning gold at the 2008 Summer Olympics and at several World Championships.

== Career ==
Born in Gosford, New South Wales, Wallace originally competed in Ironman events and only switched to sprint racing at the age of sixteen. Two years later, he was the K-1 1000 m Junior World Champion in Curitiba, Brazil.

Wallace was selected to represent Australia at the 2006 ICF Canoe Sprint World Championships in Szeged, Hungary, where he placed fifth in the K-1 1000 m final.

In 2007, Wallace at the ICF World Championships held in Duisburg, Germany placed 4th in the K-1 1000m Final. This result qualified Australia a berth at the 2008 Olympic Games.

Wallace won two medals at the 2008 Summer Olympics in Beijing with gold in the K-1 500 m and bronze in the K-1 1000 m events. He also won two medals at the ICF Canoe Sprint World Championships with a gold (K-1 5000 m: 2010) and a bronze (K-1 500 m: 2009).

He was awarded the Order of Australia in 2009.

In February 2011, Wallace competed in the third season of the Channel Seven television series Australia's Greatest Athlete.

Awards and achievements
Preceded by Nathan Deakes and Anna Meares	Australian Athlete of the Year; 2008 (with Heath Francis)	Succeeded by Emma Moffatt and Brenton Rickard
