= Daniel Havel =

Czech canoeist

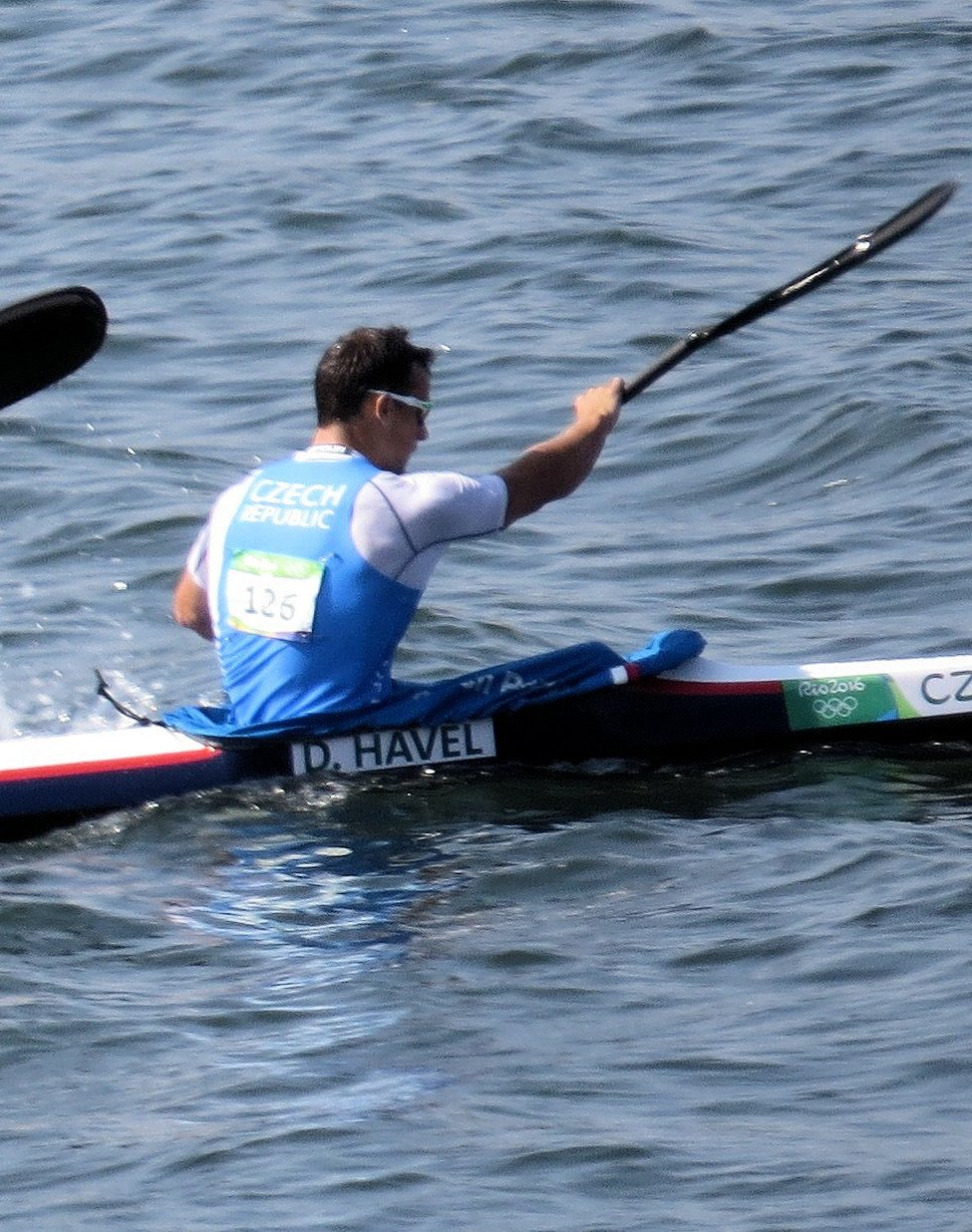

Personal information
- Nationality: Czech
- Born: 8 October 1991 (age 34) Prague, Czech Republic
- Height: 1.78 m (5 ft 10 in)
- Weight: 79 kg (174 lb)

Sport
- Country: Czech Republic
- Sport: Sprint kayak
- Club: ASC Dukla Praha
Medal record
Men's sprint kayak
Representing Czech Republic
| Event | 1st | 2nd | 3rd |
|---|---|---|---|
| Olympic Games | 0 | 0 | 2 |
| World Championships | 1 | 1 | 6 |
| European Championships | 3 | 2 | 4 |
| Total | 4 | 3 | 12 |
Olympic Games
| Bronze medal – third place | 2012 London | K-4 1000 m |
| Bronze medal – third place | 2016 Rio de Janeiro | K-4 1000 m |
World Championships
| Gold medal – first place | 2014 Moscow | K-4 1000 m |
| Silver medal – second place | 2013 Duisburg | K-4 1000 m |
| Bronze medal – third place | 2010 Poznań | K-4 1000 m |
| Bronze medal – third place | 2015 Milan | K-4 1000 m |
| Bronze medal – third place | 2017 Račice | K-2 1000 m |
| Bronze medal – third place | 2017 Račice | K-4 500 m |
| Bronze medal – third place | 2021 Copenhagen | K-4 500 m |
| Bronze medal – third place | 2026 Poznań | K-2 500 m |
European Championships
| Gold medal – first place | 2013 Montemor-o-Velho | K-4 1000 m |
| Gold medal – first place | 2014 Brandenburg | K-4 1000 m |
| Gold medal – first place | 2015 Račice | K-4 1000 m |
| Silver medal – second place | 2025 Racice | K-2 500 m |
| Silver medal – second place | 2025 Racice | K-4 500 m |
| Bronze medal – third place | 2010 Trasona | K-4 1000 m |
| Bronze medal – third place | 2013 Montemor-o-Velho | K-2 1000 m |
| Bronze medal – third place | 2015 Račice | K-2 1000 m |
| Bronze medal – third place | 2026 Montemor-o-Velho | K-2 500 m |

Daniel Havel (Czech pronunciation: [ˈdanɪjɛl ˈɦavɛl]; born 10 August 1991) is a Czech sprint canoeist who has competed since the late 2000s. He is a two-time Olympic bronze medalist.

== Career ==
Havel began to train in sprint canoe in 1999.

He won the bronze medal in the K-4 1000 m event at the 2010 ICF Canoe Sprint World Championships in Poznań.

In 2012, he won silver in the same event at the World Championships in Duisburg. That year, the Czech K-4 1000 m team he was part of won Olympic bronze. In 2013, at the European Championships, the K-4 1000 m team won gold, while the K-2 1000 m team Havel shared with Jan Sterba, won bronze. In 2014, he completed his set of K-4 1000 m World Championship medals, winning gold in Moscow.

In 2015, the Czech K-4 1000 m team won World bronze again. At the European Championships that year, Havel repeated the results of the 2013 European Championships.

At the 2017 World Championships, he won bronze in the K-2 1000 m and the K-4 500 m.

Havel sold trophies he was awarded following his Olympic medals to support young Czech canoeists.

His wife, Andrea Havlova, is also an international competitor in the sprint canoe.
