= Erik Vlček =

Slovak canoeist

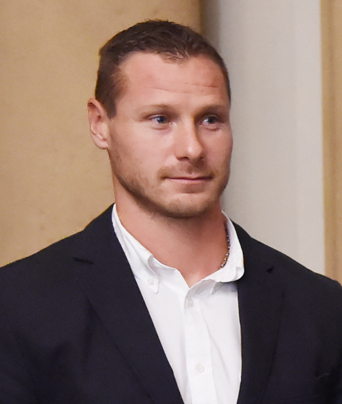
- Vlček in 2015

Personal information
- Nationality: Slovak
- Born: 29 December 1981 (age 44) Komárno, Czechoslovakia
- Height: 1.90 m (6 ft 3 in)
- Weight: 89 kg (196 lb)

Sport
- Country: Slovakia
- Sport: Sprint kayak
- Events: K-2 500 m, K-2 1000 m, K-4 500 m, K-4 1000 m
- Club: SKP Bratislava
Medal record
Men's canoe sprint
Representing Slovakia
Olympic Games
Silver medal – second place	2008 Beijing	K-4 1000 m
Silver medal – second place	2016 Rio de Janeiro	K-4 1000 m
Bronze medal – third place	2004 Athens	K-4 1000 m
Bronze medal – third place	2020 Tokyo	K-4 500 m
World Championships
Gold medal – first place	2002 Seville	K-4 500 m
Gold medal – first place	2002 Seville	K-4 1000 m
Gold medal – first place	2003 Gainesville	K-4 500 m
Gold medal – first place	2003 Gainesville	K-4 1000 m
Gold medal – first place	2006 Szeged	K-4 500 m
Gold medal – first place	2007 Duisburg	K-4 500 m
Gold medal – first place	2011 Szeged	K-2 1000 m
Gold medal – first place	2014 Moscow	K-2 500 m
Gold medal – first place	2014 Moscow	K-2 1000 m
Gold medal – first place	2015 Milan	K-4 1000 m
Silver medal – second place	2005 Zagreb	K-4 1000 m
Silver medal – second place	2009 Dartmouth	K-4 200 m
Silver medal – second place	2018 Montemor-o-Velho	K-4 1000 m
Bronze medal – third place	2001 Poznań	K-4 500 m
Bronze medal – third place	2007 Duisburg	K-4 1000 m
Bronze medal – third place	2009 Dartmouth	K-4 1000 m
Bronze medal – third place	2019 Szeged	K-4 500 m
European Games
Bronze medal – third place	2019 Minsk	K-4 500 m
European Championships
Gold medal – first place	2001 Milan	K-4 1000 m
Gold medal – first place	2002 Szeged	K-4 500 m
Gold medal – first place	2002 Szeged	K-4 1000 m
Gold medal – first place	2005 Poznań	K-4 1000 m
Gold medal – first place	2006 Račice	K-4 500 m
Gold medal – first place	2006 Račice	K-4 1000 m
Gold medal – first place	2007 Pontevedra	K-4 500 m
Gold medal – first place	2007 Pontevedra	K-4 1000 m
Gold medal – first place	2008 Milan	K-4 500 m
Gold medal – first place	2008 Milan	K-4 1000 m
Gold medal – first place	2016 Moscow	K-4 1000 m
Silver medal – second place	2000 Poznań	K-4 500 m
Silver medal – second place	2001 Milan	K-4 500 m
Silver medal – second place	2009 Brandenburg	K-4 1000 m
Silver medal – second place	2011 Belgrade	K-2 500 m
Silver medal – second place	2015 Račice	K-2 500 m
Silver medal – second place	2016 Moscow	K-4 500 m
Silver medal – second place	2017 Plovdiv	K-4 500 m
Bronze medal – third place	2012 Zagreb	K-2 1000 m
Bronze medal – third place	2014 Brandenburg	K-2 1000 m
Bronze medal – third place	2017 Plovdiv	K-4 1000 m

Erik Vlček (Hungarian: Vlcsek Erik; born 29 December 1981) is a Slovak sprint canoer who has competed since the late 1990s. He is a member of the Hungarian community in Slovakia. Since 2023 he has served as an MP of the National Council of the Slovak Republic.

Competing in five Summer Olympics, he won three medals in the K-4 1000 m event with a silver in 2008, 2016 and a bronze in 2004.

Vlček also won fifteen medals at the ICF Canoe Sprint World Championships with ten golds (K-4 500 m: 2002, 2003, 2006, 2007; K-4 1000 m: 2002, 2003, 2015; K-2 1000 m: 2011, 2014 and K-2 500 m: 2014), two silvers (K-4 200 m: 2009, K-4 1000 m: 2005), and three bronzes (K-4 500 m: 2001, K-4 1000 m: 2007, 2009).

He has been a scholarship holder with the Olympic Solidarity program since August 2002. Vlček is a member of the ŠKP club in Bratislava. He is 189 cm (6 ft 2 in) tall and weighs 89 kg (196 lb).

== Political career ==
Vlček was a city councillor in Komárno, running as an independent candidate in 2022. On 25 April 2023, it was announced that Vlček would run for HLAS-SD in 2023 parliamentary elections.
