= Fabio Wyss =

Swiss canoeist (born 1989)

Personal information
- Born: 9 June 1989 (age 37)

Sport
- Sport: Canoe sprint

Achievements and titles
- Olympic finals: 2016 Summer Olympics

Fabio Wyss (born 9 June 1989) is a Swiss canoeist. He competed in the men's K-1 1000 metres event at the 2016 Summer Olympics.
