= Stanislau Daineka =

Belarusian canoeist

Personal information
- Nationality: Belarusian
- Born: 8 July 1998 (age 27)

Sport
- Country: Belarus
- Sport: Sprint kayak
- Event(s): K-2 500 m, K-4 500 m
Medal record
Men's canoe sprint
Representing Belarus
World Championships
Gold medal – first place	2019 Szeged	K-2 500 m

Stanislau Daineka (Belarusian: Станіслаў Дайнека; born 8 July 1998) is a Belarusian sprint canoeist.

He won a medal at the 2019 ICF Canoe Sprint World Championships.
