= Max Hoff (canoeist) =

German sprint canoeist (born 1982)

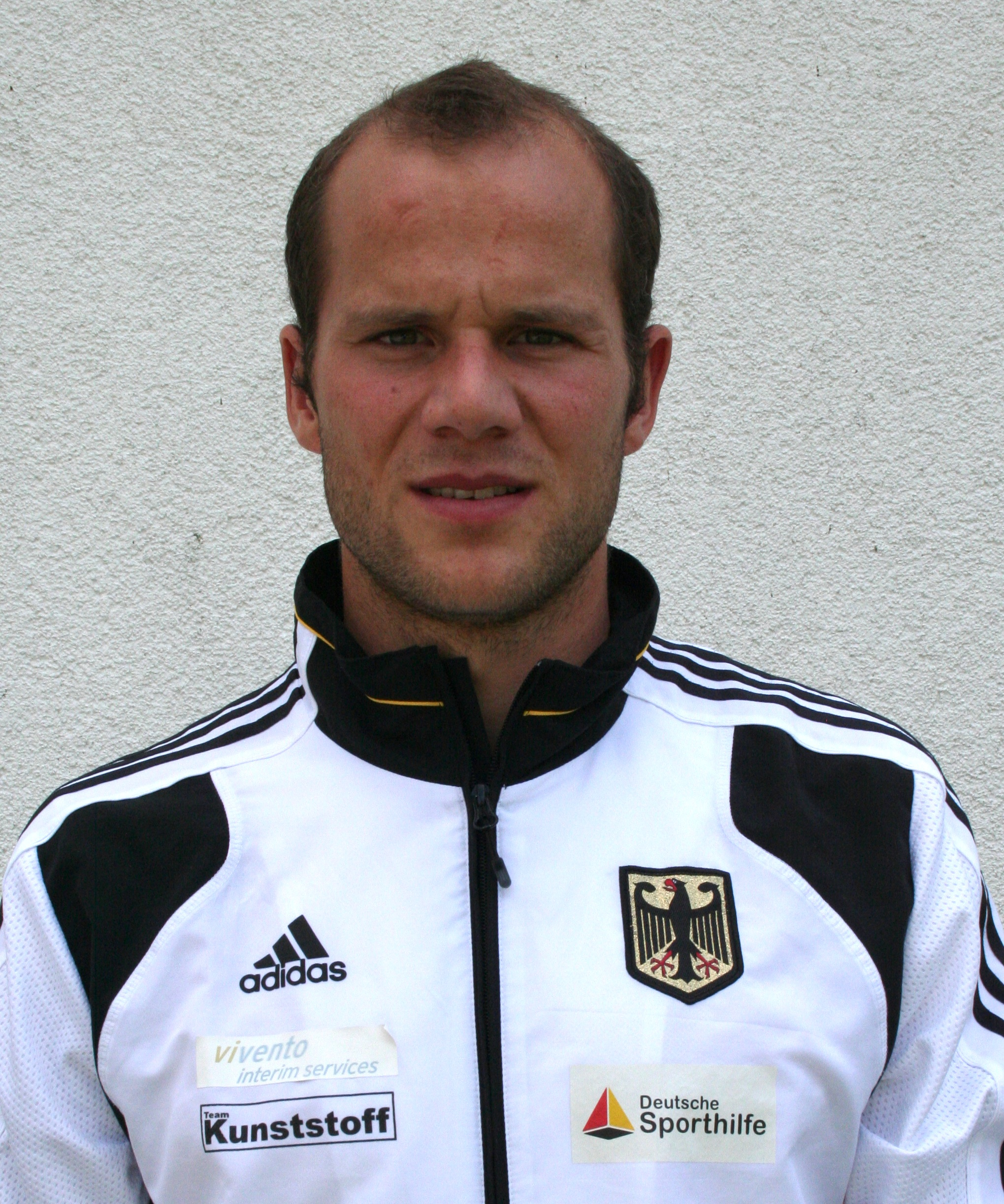
- Hoff in 2011

Personal information
- Nationality: German
- Born: 12 September 1982 (age 43) Troisdorf, West Germany
- Height: 1.97 m (6 ft 6 in)
- Weight: 96 kg (212 lb)
- Website: maxhoff.de

Sport
- Country: Germany
- Sport: Sprint kayak
- Events: K-1 500 m, K-1 1000 m, K-1 5000 m, K-2 1000 m, K-4 1000 m
- Club: Kanusport-Gemeinschaft Essen
Medal record
Men's canoe sprint
Representing Germany
Olympic Games
Bronze medal – third place	2012 London	K-1 1000 m
Gold medal – first place	2016 Rio de Janeiro	K-4 1000 m
Silver medal – second place	2020 Tokyo	K-2 1000 m
World Championships
Gold medal – first place	2009 Dartmouth	K-1 1000 m
Gold medal – first place	2010 Poznań	K-1 1000 m
Gold medal – first place	2011 Szeged	K-1 5000 m
Gold medal – first place	2011 Szeged	K-4 1000 m
Gold medal – first place	2013 Duisburg	K-1 1000 m
Gold medal – first place	2018 Montemor-o-Velho	K-2 1000 m
Gold medal – first place	2019 Szeged	K-2 1000 m
Silver medal – second place	2010 Poznań	K-1 5000 m
Silver medal – second place	2014 Moscow	K-1 5000 m
Silver medal – second place	2015 Milan	K-1 5000 m
Silver medal – second place	2017 Račice	K-1 5000 m
Silver medal – second place	2019 Szeged	K-1 5000 m
European Games
Gold medal – first place	2015 Baku	K-1 1000 m
Gold medal – first place	2015 Baku	K-1 5000 m
Gold medal – first place	2019 Minsk	K-2 1000 m
Bronze medal – third place	2019 Minsk	K-1 5000 m
European Championships
Gold medal – first place	2011 Belgrade	K-1 1000 m
Gold medal – first place	2012 Zagreb	K-1 1000 m
Gold medal – first place	2013 Montemor-o-Velho	K-1 5000 m
Gold medal – first place	2014 Brandenburg	K-1 5000 m
Gold medal – first place	2015 Račice	K-1 1000 m
Gold medal – first place	2016 Moscow	K-2 1000 m
Gold medal – first place	2017 Plovdiv	K-1 5000 m
Gold medal – first place	2018 Belgrade	K-1 5000 m
Gold medal – first place	2017 Plovdiv	K-2 1000 m
Gold medal – first place	2021 Poznań	K-2 1000 m
Silver medal – second place	2011 Belgrade	K-4 1000 m
Silver medal – second place	2013 Montemor-o-Velho	K-1 1000 m
Silver medal – second place	2015 Račice	K-1 5000 m
Silver medal – second place	2018 Belgrade	K-2 1000 m
Bronze medal – third place	2013 Montemor-o-Velho	K-1 500 m
Bronze medal – third place	2014 Brandenburg	K-1 1000 m
Bronze medal – third place	2021 Poznań	K-2 500 m

Max Hoff (born 12 September 1982) is a German sprint canoeist and former wildwater canoeist who has competed since the late 2000s. He has won a total of eight medals at the ICF Canoe Sprint World Championships with five golds (K-1 1000 m: 2009, 2010, 2013; K-1 5000 m: 2011 and K-4 1000 m: 2011 ) and three silvers (K-1 5000 m: 2010, 2014, 2015).

At the 2012 Summer Olympics, he won the bronze medal in the K-1 1000 m. Four years later, at the 2016 Summer Olympics, he won a gold medal in the K-4 1000 m event as well as finishing seventh overall in the K-1 1000m event. He finished fifth in the K-1 1000 m event at the 2008 Summer Olympics in Beijing.

== Major results ==
=== World championships ===
Year	K-1 500	K-1 1000	K-1 5000	K-2 1000	K-4 1000
2007		1 FB			
2009		1st place, gold medalist(s)			
2010	5	1st place, gold medalist(s)	2nd place, silver medalist(s)		
2011		4	1st place, gold medalist(s)		1st place, gold medalist(s)
2013		1st place, gold medalist(s)	4		
2014	8	9	2nd place, silver medalist(s)		
2015		4	2nd place, silver medalist(s)		
2017			2nd place, silver medalist(s)	5	
2018			2nd place, silver medalist(s)	1st place, gold medalist(s)	
