= David Varela =

Portuguese canoeist

Personal information
- Full name: David António Lagarto Varela
- Nationality: Portuguese
- Born: 16 November 1993 (age 32) Vila Franca de Xira, Portugal

Sport
- Sport: Canoe sprint

David António Lagarto Varela (born 16 November 1993) is a Portuguese canoeist. He competed in the men's K-4 500 metres event at the 2020 Summer Olympics.
