= Max Rendschmidt =

German canoeist (born 1993)

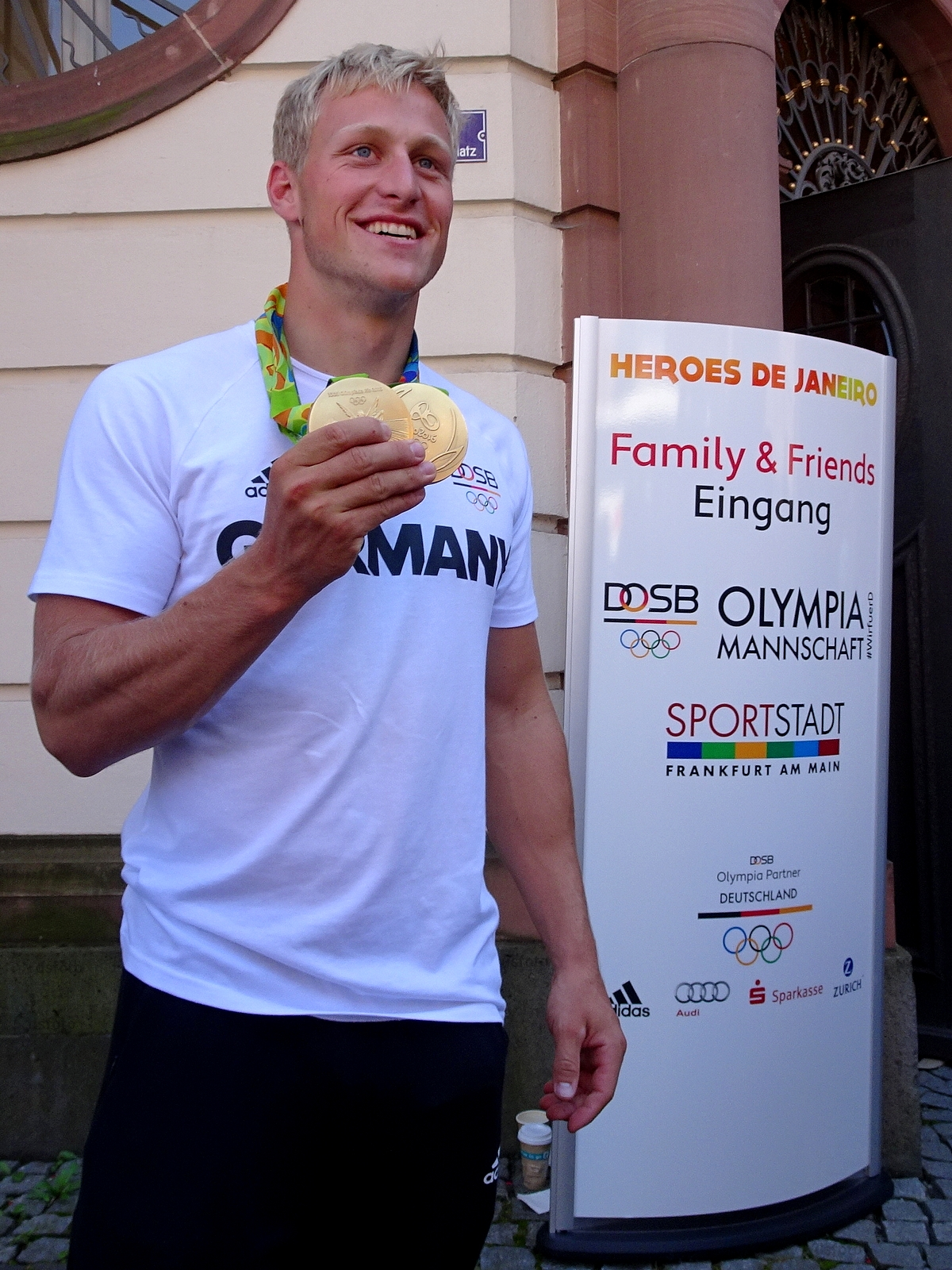
- Rendschmidt in 2016

Personal information
- Nationality: German
- Born: 12 December 1993 (age 32) Bonn, Germany
- Height: 1.86 m (6 ft 1 in)
- Weight: 90 kg (198 lb)

Sport
- Country: Germany
- Sport: Sprint kayak
- Events: K-1 1000 m, K-2 500 m, K-2 1000 m, K-4 500 m, K-4 1000 m
- Club: Kanusport-Gemeinschaft Essen
Medal record
Men's canoe sprint
Representing Germany
Olympic Games
Gold medal – first place	2016 Rio de Janeiro	K-2 1000 m
Gold medal – first place	2016 Rio de Janeiro	K-4 1000 m
Gold medal – first place	2020 Tokyo	K-4 500 m
Gold medal – first place	2024 Paris	K-4 500 m
World Championships
Gold medal – first place	2013 Duisburg	K-2 1000 m
Gold medal – first place	2015 Milan	K-2 1000 m
Gold medal – first place	2017 Račice	K-4 500 m
Gold medal – first place	2018 Montemor-o-Velho	K-4 500 m
Gold medal – first place	2019 Szeged	K-4 500 m
Gold medal – first place	2023 Duisburg	K-4 500 m
Gold medal – first place	2026 Poznań	K-4 500 m
Silver medal – second place	2018 Montemor-o-Velho	K-1 1000 m
Silver medal – second place	2022 Dartmouth	K-4 500 m
European Championships
Gold medal – first place	2013 Montemor-o-Velho	K-2 500 m
Gold medal – first place	2013 Montemor-o-Velho	K-2 1000 m
Gold medal – first place	2014 Brandenburg	K-2 1000 m
Gold medal – first place	2015 Račice	K-2 500 m
Gold medal – first place	2015 Račice	K-2 1000 m
Gold medal – first place	2021 Poznań	K-4 500 m
Gold medal – first place	2022 Munich	K-4 500 m
Silver medal – second place	2018 Belgrade	K-4 500 m
Silver medal – second place	2026 Montemor-o-Velho	K-4 500 m
Bronze medal – third place	2018 Belgrade	K-1 1000 m
European Games
Silver medal – second place	2015 Baku	K-2 1000 m
Silver medal – second place	2019 Minsk	K-4 500 m

Max Rendschmidt (born 12 December 1993) is a German Olympic canoeist. He represented his country at the 2016 Summer Olympics in Rio de Janeiro and won two gold medals, in K-2 1000 metres and K-4 1000 m events. He also won gold in the K-4 500 metres at the 2020 and 2024 Summer Olympics.

== Career ==
He is a five-time world champion and seven-time European champion. On 1 November 2016, Rendschmidt received the Silver Laurel Leaf, the highest award for an athlete in Germany, from the German Federal President Joachim Gauck in Berlin. He works for the German Federal Police.
