= Tibor Hufnágel =

Hungarian canoeist (born 1991)

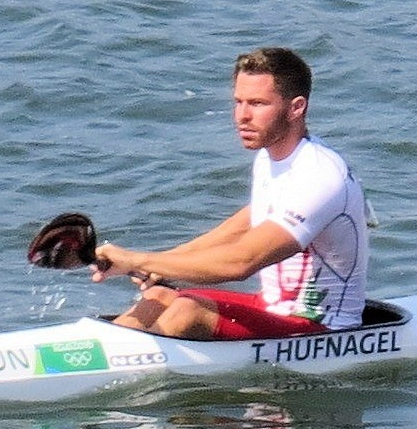
- Hufnágel at the 2016 Olympics

Personal information
- Born: 18 March 1991 (age 35) Budapest, Hungary
- Education: Edutus College, Budapest
- Height: 175 cm (5 ft 9 in)
- Weight: 75 kg (165 lb)

Sport
- Sport: Canoe sprint
- Club: Angyalföldi VSE; Budapesti Honved SE
- Coached by: Márfi Gábor Pál Zoltán; István Kiss

Tibor Hufnágel (born 18 March 1991) is a Hungarian sprint canoeist. He competed in the K-2 1000 and K-4 1000 m events at the 2016 Summer Olympics and placed 7th and 11th, respectively.

He originally won a silver medal with Bence Dombvári in the K-2 1000 m event at the 2016 European Championships until Dombvári tested positive for stanozolol.

Hufnágel began paddling aged 10, following his brother. His brother did canoeing, but Hufnágel did not want to kneel, and chose kayaking instead.
