= Ričardas Nekriošius =

Lithuanian canoeist (born 1986)

Personal information
- Nationality: Lithuanian
- Born: 12 September 1986 (age 39)

Sport
- Country: Lithuanian
- Sport: Canoe sprint
- Event: Kayaking
Medal record
Men's canoeing
Representing Lithuania
World Championships
Silver medal – second place	2011 Szeged	K-2 500 m
Bronze medal – third place	2018 Montemor-o-Velho	K-2 500 m
European Championships
Bronze medal – third place	2021 Poznań	K-2 1000 m

Ričardas Nekriošius (born 12 September 1986) is a Lithuanian canoeist.

In 2015 he and Andrej Olijnik finished at 7th place in World Championships and qualified for the 2016 Summer Olympics.
