= Giulio Dressino =

Italian canoeist (born 1992)

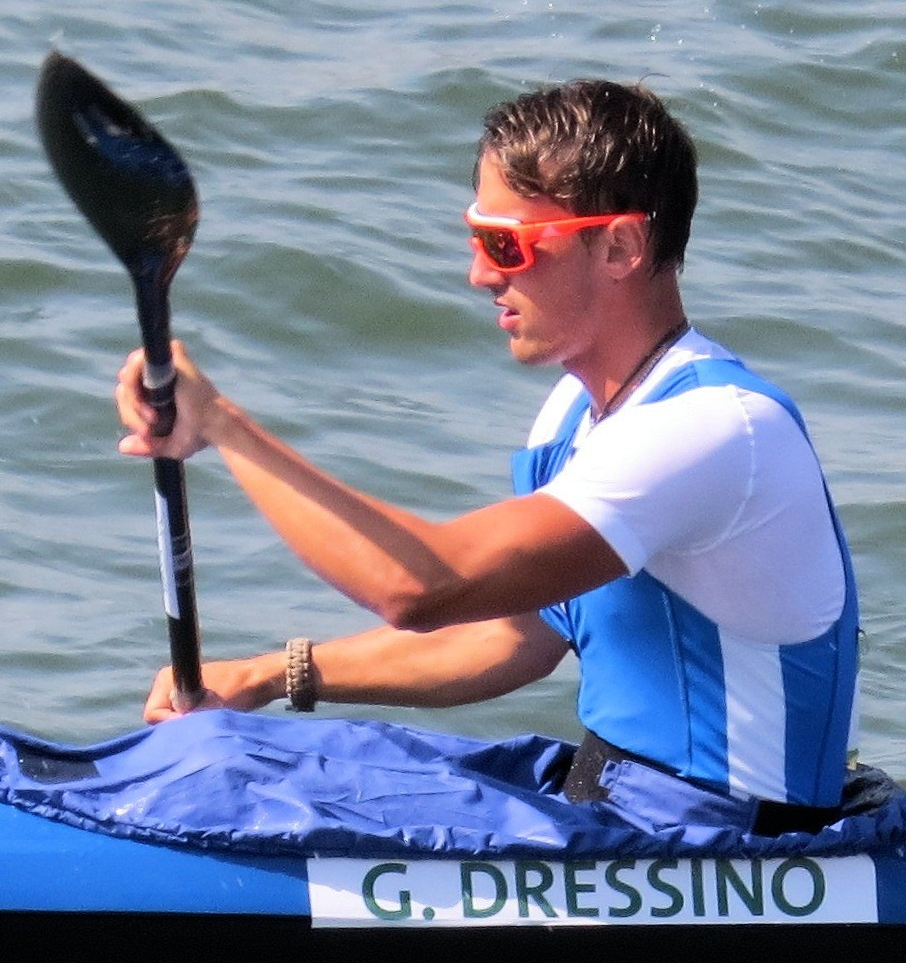
- Dressino at the 2016 Olympics

Personal information
- Born: 5 November 1992 (age 33) Gallarate, Varese, Italy
- Education: University of Insubria
- Height: 183 cm (6 ft 0 in)
- Weight: 75 kg (165 lb)

Sport
- Sport: Canoe sprint
- Club: Fiamme Gialle
- Coached by: Claudio Ghelardini (club)

Giulio Dressino (born 5 November 1992) is an Italian canoeist. He placed sixth in the K-2 1000 m and 14th in the K-4 1000 m events at the 2016 Summer Olympics.
