= Nicola Ripamonti =

Italian canoeist (born 1990)

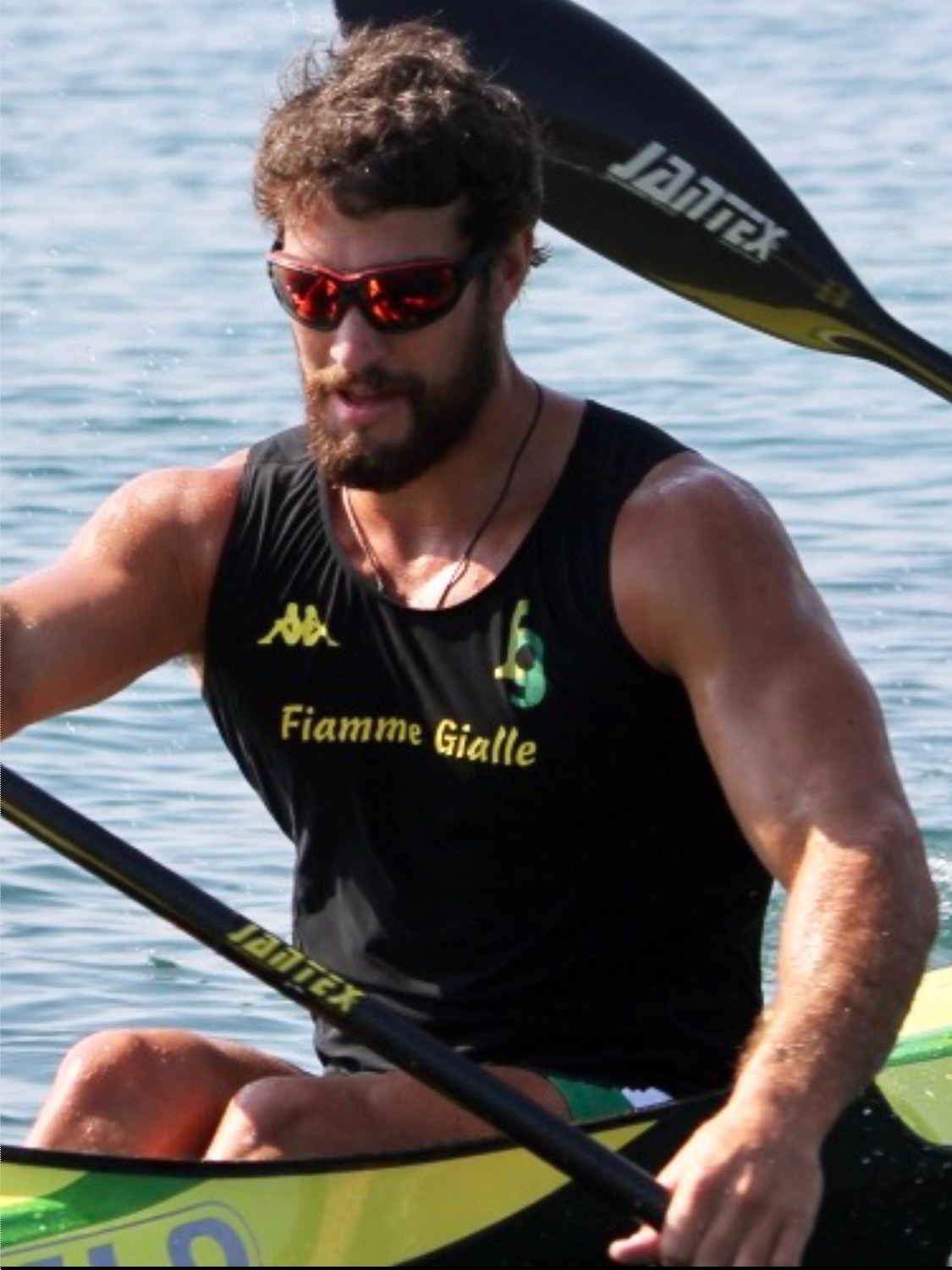

Personal information
- Born: 11 January 1990 (age 36)

Sport
- Sport: Canoe sprint

Nicola Ripamonti (born 11 January 1990) is an Italian canoeist. He competed in the Men's K-2 1000 metres event at the 2016 Summer Olympics.
