= Emanuel Silva =

Portuguese canoeist (born 1985)

GOIH Emanuel Silva
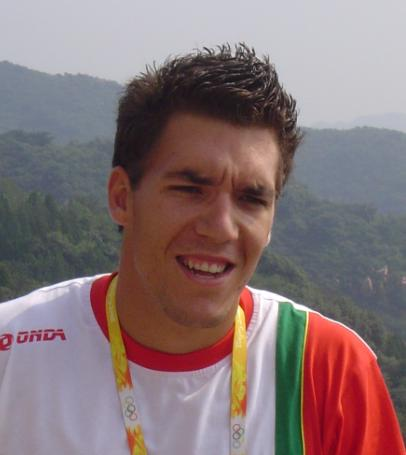
- Silva in 2008

Personal information
- Full name: Emanuel Eduardo Pimenta Vieira da Silva
- Nationality: Portuguese
- Born: 4 December 1985 (age 40) Braga, Portugal

Sport
- Country: Portugal
- Sport: Canoeing
- Event: K-1
- Club: Sporting CP
Medal record
Men's canoe sprint
Representing Portugal
Olympic Games
| Silver medal – second place | 2012 London | K-2 1000m |
World Championships
| Gold medal – first place | 2013 Duisburg | K-2 500 m |
| Silver medal – second place | 2014 Moscow | K-4 1000 m |
European Championships
| Gold medal – first place | 2011 Belgrade | K-4 1000 m |
| Gold medal – first place | 2014 Brandenburg | K-2 500 m |
| Silver medal – second place | 2013 Montemor-o-Velho | K-4 1000 m |
| Bronze medal – third place | 2005 Poznań | K-1 1000 m |
| Bronze medal – third place | 2010 Trasona | K-2 500 m |
| Bronze medal – third place | 2011 Belgrade | K-2 500 m |
| Bronze medal – third place | 2014 Brandenburg | K-4 1000 m |

Emanuel Eduardo Pimenta Vieira da Silva, GOIH (born 4 December 1985), is a Portuguese sprint canoer. He was born in Braga. A finalist at the 2004 Olympics and medalist at the 2012 Olympics, he is Portugal's most successful kayak sprinter since the 1980s.

Despite training with very limited resources, Silva became outright Portuguese individual champion over three distances (500 m, 1000 m and 10,000 m) at the age of just sixteen.

In 2003 he starred at the world junior championships in Komatsu, Japan, winning the K1 500 m gold medal and silver in the K1 1000 m. He then competed in his first senior world championships, in Gainesville, USA, placing a highly-creditable sixteenth in the K-1 1000 m.

In 2004 he reached his first senior final, finishing in seventh place at the European championships in Poznań, Poland. Still only eighteen years old, and technically a junior, he was the second-youngest competitor in the blue riband K-1 1000 m event at the Athens Olympics and exceeded expectations by reaching the final. There he finished in seventh place in a time of 3:33.862.

He followed up his Athens success by winning the 2005 European Under-23 Championship K1 1000 m final in Plovdiv, Bulgaria. Later in the season he won the first senior medal of his career, the K1 1000 m bronze at the European Championships in Poznań, Poland.

In 2006 he retained his European under-23 title at Schinias, Greece. In senior competition he achieved his best-ever world championship placing, seventh, at the World Championships in Szeged.

Silva was not as successful at the 2008 Summer Olympics in Beijing as he was eliminated in the semifinals of both the K-1 500 m and the K-1 1000 m event.

At the London Olympic Games, he won the silver medal along with Fernando Pimenta in the K-2 1000 m event. Since then he has also become world champion in the K-2 500 m in 2013 with João Ribeiro.

Silva is now a member of the Clube Náutico de Prado, Vila de Prado, Portugal.

== Orders ==
- Grand Officer of the Order of Prince Henry

Awards
| Preceded by Portugal national under-20 football team | Portuguese Team of the Year; 2012 (1000 meter K2 team with Fernando Pimenta) | Succeeded by 500 meter K2 team (Joana Vasconcelos and Beatriz Gomes) |
