= 2022 ICF Canoe Sprint World Championships – Men's K-4 500 metres =

Men's K-4 500 metres at the 2022 ICF Canoe Sprint World Championships
- Venue: Lake Banook
- Location: Dartmouth, Canada
- Dates: 3–6 August
- Competitors: 84 from 21 nations

Medalists
gold medal	Saúl Craviotto; Carlos Arévalo; Marcus Walz; Rodrigo Germade	Spain
silver medal	Max Rendschmidt; Tom Liebscher; Jacob Schopf; Max Lemke	Germany
bronze medal	Oleh Kukharyk; Dmytro Danylenko; Igor Trunov; Ivan Semykin	Ukraine

The men's K-4 500 metres competition at the 2022 ICF Canoe Sprint World Championships in Dartmouth took place on Lake Banook.

== Schedule ==
The schedule is as follows:

Date	Time	Round
Wednesday 3 August 2022	11:42	Heats
Friday 5 August 2022	10:21	Semifinals
Saturday 6 August 2022	11:19	Final A
Saturday 6 August 2022	14:30	Final B

== Results ==
=== Heats ===
The fastest boat in each heat advanced directly to the A final.
The next six fastest boats in each heat advanced to the semifinals.

==== Heat 1 ====
Rank	Canoeist	Country	Time	Notes
1	Saúl Craviotto; Carlos Arévalo; Marcus Walz; Rodrigo Germade	Spain	1:21.60	QA
2	Oleh Kukharyk; Dmytro Danylenko; Igor Trunov; Ivan Semykin	Ukraine	1:22.43	QS
3	István Kuli; Kolos Csizmadia; Ádám Varga; Bence Nádas	Hungary	1:23.53	QF
4	Rasmus Knudsen; Victor Aasmul; Magnus Sibbersen; Morten Graversen	Denmark	1:24.53	QS
5	Simonas Maldonis; Mindaugas Maldonis; Ignas Navakauskas; Artūras Seja	Lithuania	1:24.55	QS
6	Keiji Mizumoto; Momotaro Matsushita; Taishi Tanada; Seiji Komatsu	Japan	1:25.33	QS
7	Miles Cross-Whiter; Aaron Small; Jesse Lishchuk; Nathaniel Errez	United States	1:29.87	QS

==== Heat 2 ====
Rank	Canoeist	Country	Time	Notes
1	Max Rendschmidt; Tom Liebscher; Jacob Schopf; Max Lemke	Germany	1:21.52	QA
2	Samuel Balaz; Denis Mysak; Csaba Zalka; Adam Botek	Slovakia	1:21.56	QS
3	Guillaume Burger; Maxime Beaumont; Quilian Koch; Guillaume Decorchemont	France	1:23.41	QS
4	Pierre van der Westhuyzen; Fletcher Armstrong; Jackson Collins; Noah Havard	Australia	3:39.96	QS
5	Juan Ignacio Cáceres; Gonzalo Benassi; Gonzalo Carreras; Agustin Rodriguez	Argentina	1:24.52	QS
6	Thomas Lusty; Trevor Thomson; Noah Dembele; Lewis Fletcher	Great Britain	1:25.40	QS
7	Alberto Fragoza; Daniel Ledesma; José Alcazar; Osbaldo Fuentes	Mexico	1:32.11	QS

==== Heat 3 ====
Rank	Canoeist	Country	Time	Notes
1	Jakub Stepun; Bartosz Grabowski; Slawomir Witczak; Jakub Michalski	Poland	1:22.26	QA
2	Jakub Špicar; Radek Šlouf; Jakub Zavrel; Daniel Havel	Czech Republic	1:22.62	QS
3	João Ribeiro; Messias Baptista; Emanuel Silva; David Varela	Portugal	1:23.62	QS
4	Nicholas Matveev; Pierre-Luc Poulin; Laurent Lavigne; Simon McTavish	Canada	1:24.24	QS
5	Andrea Schera; Nicola Ripamonti; Tommaso Freschi; Manfredi Rizza	Italy	1:24.79	QS
6	Benjamin Duffy; Hamish Legarth; James Munro; Zach Ferkins	New Zealand	1:25.81	QS
7	Koh Teck; Jovi Kalaichelvan; Teo Zhan; Teo Wei	Singapore	1:34.63	QS

=== Semifinals ===
The fastest three boats in each semi advanced to the A final.
The next four fastest boats in each semi, plus the fastest remaining boat advanced to the B final.

==== Semifinal 1 ====
Rank	Canoeist	Country	Time	Notes
1	Jakub Špicar; Radek Šlouf; Jakub Zavrel; Daniel Havel	Czech Republic	1:23.37	QA
2	Guillaume Burger; Maxime Beaumont; Quilian Koch; Guillaume Decorchemont	France	1:23.58	QA
3	Nicholas Matveev; Pierre-Luc Poulin; Laurent Lavigne; Simon McTavish	Canada	1:23.94	QA
4	István Kuli; Kolos Csizmadia; Ádám Varga; Bence Nádas	Hungary	1:24.07	QB
5	Simonas Maldonis; Mindaugas Maldonis; Ignas Navakauskas; Artūras Seja	Lithuania	1:24.07	QB
6	Pierre van der Westhuyzen; Fletcher Armstrong; Jackson Collins; Noah Havard	Australia	1:25.10	QB
7	Thomas Lusty; Trevor Thomson; Noah Dembele; Lewis Fletcher	Great Britain	1:25.37	QB
8	Keiji Mizumoto; Momotaro Matsushita; Taishi Tanada; Seiji Komatsu	Japan	1:25.79	qB
9	Koh Teck; Jovi Kalaichelvan; Teo Zhan; Teo Wei	Singapore	1:35.78	

==== Semifinal 2 ====
Rank	Canoeist	Country	Time	Notes
1	Oleh Kukharyk; Dmytro Danylenko; Igor Trunov; Ivan Semykin	Ukraine	1:23.42	QA
2	Samuel Balaz; Denis Mysak; Csaba Zalka; Adam Botek	Slovakia	1:24.06	QA
3	João Ribeiro; Messias Baptista; Emanuel Silva; David Varela	Portugal	1:25.28	QA
4	Juan Ignacio Cáceres; Gonzalo Benassi; Gonzalo Carreras; Agustin Rodriguez	Argentina	1:26.12	QB
5	Rasmus Knudsen; Victor Aasmul; Magnus Sibbersen; Morten Graversen	Denmark	1:26.14	QB
6	Andrea Schera; Nicola Ripamonti; Tommaso Freschi; Manfredi Rizza	Italy	1:26.45	QB
7	Benjamin Duffy; Hamish Legarth; James Munro; Zach Ferkins	New Zealand	1:27.88	QB
8	Miles Cross-Whiter; Aaron Small; Jesse Lishchuk; Nathaniel Errez	United States	1:32.71	
9	Alberto Fragoza; Daniel Ledesma; José Alcazar; Osbaldo Fuentes	Mexico	1:34.49	

=== Finals ===
==== Final B ====
Competitors in this final raced for positions 10 to 18.

Rank	Canoeist	Country	Time
1	Simonas Maldonis; Mindaugas Maldonis; Ignas Navakauskas; Artūras Seja	Lithuania	1:27.88
2	István Kuli; Kolos Csizmadia; Ádám Varga; Bence Nádas	Hungary	1:28.11
3	Pierre van der Westhuyzen; Fletcher Armstrong; Jackson Collins; Noah Havard	Australia	1:29.55
4	Rasmus Knudsen; Victor Aasmul; Magnus Sibbersen; Morten Graversen	Denmark	1:29.77
5	Thomas Lusty; Trevor Thomson; Noah Dembele; Lewis Fletcher	Great Britain	1:30.11
6	Juan Ignacio Cáceres; Gonzalo Benassi; Gonzalo Carreras; Agustin Rodriguez	Argentina	1:30.50
7	Andrea Schera; Nicola Ripamonti; Tommaso Freschi; Manfredi Rizza	Italy	1:30.89
8	Benjamin Duffy; Hamish Legarth; James Munro; Zach Ferkins	New Zealand	1:31.74
	Keiji Mizumoto; Momotaro Matsushita; Taishi Tanada; Seiji Komatsu	Japan	DNS

==== Final A ====
Competitors in this final raced for positions 1 to 9, with medals going to the top three.

Rank	Canoeist	Country	Time
1st place, gold medalist(s)	Saúl Craviotto; Carlos Arévalo; Marcus Walz; Rodrigo Germade	Spain	1:20.83
2nd place, silver medalist(s)	Max Rendschmidt; Tom Liebscher; Jacob Schopf; Max Lemke	Germany	1:21.27
3rd place, bronze medalist(s)	Oleh Kukharyk; Dmytro Danylenko; Igor Trunov; Ivan Semykin	Ukraine	3:37.77
4	Samuel Balaz; Denis Mysak; Csaba Zalka; Adam Botek	Slovakia	1:22.38
5	Nicholas Matveev; Pierre-Luc Poulin; Laurent Lavigne; Simon McTavish	Canada	1:22.57
6	Guillaume Burger; Maxime Beaumont; Quilian Koch; Guillaume Decorchemont	France	1:22.68
7	João Ribeiro; Messias Baptista; Emanuel Silva; David Varela	Portugal	1:22.94
8	Jakub Stepun; Bartosz Grabowski; Slawomir Witczak; Jakub Michalski	Poland	1:23.26
9	Jakub Špicar; Radek Šlouf; Jakub Zavrel; Daniel Havel	Czech Republic	1:23.28
