= 2023 ICF Canoe Sprint World Championships – Men's K-4 500 metres =

Men's K-4 500 metres at the 2023 ICF Canoe Sprint World Championships
- Venue: Sportpark Duisburg
- Location: Duisburg, Germany
- Dates: 23-25 August
- Competitors: 116 from 29 nations
- Winning time: 1:19.183

Medalists
gold medal	Max Rendschmidt; Max Lemke; Jacob Schopf; Tom Liebscher-Lucz	Germany
silver medal	Bence Nádas; Kolos Csizmadia; István Kuli; Sándor Tótka	Hungary
bronze medal	Oleh Kukharyk; Dmytro Danylenko; Ihor Trunov; Ivan Semykin	Ukraine

The men's K-4 500 metres competition at the 2023 ICF Canoe Sprint World Championships in Duisburg took place in Sportpark Duisburg.

== Schedule ==
The schedule is as follows:

Date	Time	Round
Wednesday 23 August 2023	12:37	Heats
Friday 25 August 2023	13:57	Semifinals
Friday 25 August 2023	18:26	Final A
Friday 25 August 2023	19:18	Final B

== Results ==
=== Heats ===
The six fastest boats in each heat and three fastest 7th ranked boats advanced directly to the semi finals.

==== Heat 1 ====
Rank	Canoeist	Country	Time	Notes
1	Andjelo Dzombeta; Marko Novaković; Stefan Vrdoljak; Vladimir Torubarov	Serbia	1:19.276	QS
2	Saúl Craviotto; Carlos Arévalo; Marcus Walz; Rodrigo Germade	Spain	1:19.920	QS
3	Manfredi Rizza; Alessandro Gnecchi; Giacomo Cinti; Andrea Di Liberto	Italy	1:20.422	QS
4	Joao Ribeiro; Messias Baptista; Kevin Santos; Emanuel Silva	Portugal	1:20.461	QS
5	Keiji Mizumoto; Akihiro Inoue; Taishi Tanada; Seiji Komatsu	Japan	1:21.689	QS
6	Andrey Yerguchyov; Bekarys Ramatulla; Igor Ryashentsev; Sergii Tokarnytskyi	Kazakhstan	1:24.572	QS
7	Rodion Tuigunov; Vladislav Prokopov; Erlan Sultangaziev; Rysbek Tolomushev	Kyrgyzstan	1:28.329	QS
8	Luis López; Ruben Londoño; Yojan Cano; Leocadio Pinto	Colombia	1:30.203	

==== Heat 2 ====
Rank	Canoeist	Country	Time	Notes
1	Oleh Kukharyk; Dmytro Danylenko; Ihor Trunov; Ivan Semykin	Ukraine	1:19.614	QS
2	Denis Myšák; Samuel Baláž; Csaba Zalka; Adam Botek	Slovakia	1:20.054	QS
3	Jakub Špicar; Jakub Brabec; Jakub Zavřel; Radek Šlouf	Czech Republic	1:20.438	QS
4	Guillaume Burger; Maxime Beaumont; Quilian Koch; Guillaume Le Floch Decorchemont	France	1:20.599	QS
5	Ali Aghamirzaei; Sepehr Saatchy; Pouria Sharifi; Peyman Ghavidel Siah Sofiani	Iran	1:22.879	QS
6	Theodor Orban; Hugo Lagerstam; Karl Brodén; Erik Andersson	Sweden	1:24.345	QS
7	Colbert Manson; Philip Majumdar; Nathan Humberston; Zach Alva	United States	1:31.182	QS

==== Heat 3 ====
Rank	Canoeist	Country	Time	Notes
1	Bence Nádas; Kolos Csizmadia; István Kuli; Sándor Tótka	Hungary	1:19.569	QS
2	Jakub Stepun; Przemysław Korsak; Wiktor Leszczyński; Sławomir Witczak	Poland	1:20.253	QS
3	Victor Aasmul; Lasse Madsen; Morten Graversen; Magnus Sibbersen	Denmark	1:20.623	QS
4	Max Brown; Zach Ferkins; Kurtis Imrie; Hamish Legarth	New Zealand	1:20.703	QS
5	Cho Gwang-hee; Jo Hyun-hee; Jang Sang-won; Jeong Ju-hwan	South Korea	1:21.589	QS
6	Manuel Lascano; Gonzalo Lo Moro; Gonzalo Carreras; Agustín Rodríguez	Argentina	1:22.352	QS
	Cristian Canache; Rafael Cardoza; Ray Acuna; Daniel Roman	Venezuela	DNS	

==== Heat 4 ====
Rank	Canoeist	Country	Time	Notes
1	Max Rendschmidt; Max Lemke; Jacob Schopf; Tom Liebscher-Lucz	Germany	1:19.985	QS
2	Simonas Maldonis; Mindaugas Maldonis; Ignas Navakauskas; Artūras Seja	Lithuania	1:20.827	QS
3	Riley Fitzsimmons; Pierre van der Westhuyzen; Jackson Collins; Noah Havard	Australia	1:21.000	QS
4	Nicholas Matveev; Pierre-Luc Poulin; Laurent Lavigne; Simon McTavish	Canada	1:21.088	QS
5	Bu Tingkai; Wang Congkang; Zhang Dong; Dong Yi	China	1:22.216	QS
6	Aldis Artūrs Vilde; Aleksejs Rumjancevs; Roberts Akmens; Kārlis Dumpis	Latvia	1:27.046	QS
7	Nitin Verma; Prabhat Kumar; Vishnu Reghunath; Varinder Singh	India	1:30.791	QS

=== Semifinals ===
The fastest three boats in each semi advanced to the A final.
The next three fastest boats in each semifinal boats advanced to the B final.

==== Semifinal 1 ====
Rank	Canoeist	Country	Time	Notes
1	Andjelo Dzombeta; Marko Novaković; Stefan Vrdoljak; Vladimir Torubarov	Serbia	1:20.033	QA
2	Riley Fitzsimmons; Pierre van der Westhuyzen; Jackson Collins; Noah Havard	Australia	1:20.184	QA
3	Jakub Stepun; Przemysław Korsak; Wiktor Leszczyński; Sławomir Witczak	Poland	1:20.380	QA
4	Nicholas Matveev; Pierre-Luc Poulin; Laurent Lavigne; Simon McTavish	Canada	1:20.616	QB
5	Denis Myšák; Samuel Baláž; Csaba Zalka; Adam Botek	Slovakia	1:20.634	QB
6	Cho Gwang-hee; Jo Hyun-hee; Jang Sang-won; Jeong Ju-hwan	South Korea	1:21.993	QB
7	Keiji Mizumoto; Akihiro Inoue; Taishi Tanada; Seiji Komatsu	Japan	1:22.317	
8	Theodor Orban; Hugo Lagerstam; Karl Brodén; Erik Andersson	Sweden	1:25.930	
9	Rodion Tuigunov; Vladislav Prokopov; Erlan Sultangaziev; Rysbek Tolomushev	Kyrgyzstan	1:27.177	

==== Semifinal 2 ====
Rank	Canoeist	Country	Time	Notes
1	Oleh Kukharyk; Dmytro Danylenko; Ihor Trunov; Ivan Semykin	Ukraine	1:18.710	QA
2	Simonas Maldonis; Mindaugas Maldonis; Ignas Navakauskas; Artūras Seja	Lithuania	1:19.181	QA
3	Victor Aasmul; Lasse Madsen; Morten Graversen; Magnus Sibbersen	Denmark	1:19.480	QA
4	Max Brown; Zach Ferkins; Kurtis Imrie; Hamish Legarth	New Zealand	1:19.864	QB
5	Manfredi Rizza; Alessandro Gnecchi; Giacomo Cinti; Andrea Di Liberto	Italy	1:19.942	QB
6	Aldis Artūrs Vilde; Aleksejs Rumjancevs; Roberts Akmens; Kārlis Dumpis	Latvia	1:20.234	QB
7	Joao Ribeiro; Messias Baptista; Kevin Santos; Emanuel Silva	Portugal	1:20.593	
8	Ali Aghamirzaei; Sepehr Saatchy; Pouria Sharifi; Peyman Ghavidel Siah Sofiani	Iran	1:22.773	
9	Nitin Verma; Prabhat Kumar; Vishnu Reghunath; Varinder Singh	India	1:30.548	

==== Semifinal 3 ====
Rank	Canoeist	Country	Time	Notes
1	Max Rendschmidt; Max Lemke; Jacob Schopf; Tom Liebscher-Lucz	Germany	1:19.193	QB
2	Bence Nádas; Kolos Csizmadia; István Kuli; Sándor Tótka	Hungary	1:19.309	QB
3	Saúl Craviotto; Carlos Arévalo; Marcus Walz; Rodrigo Germade	Spain	1:19.479	QS
4	Bu Tingkai; Wang Congkang; Zhang Dong; Dong Yi	China	1:20.581	QB
5	Guillaume Burger; Maxime Beaumont; Quilian Koch; Guillaume Le Floch Decorchemont	France	1:21.032	QB
6	Jakub Špicar; Jakub Brabec; Jakub Zavřel; Radek Šlouf	Czech Republic	1:21.344	QB
7	Manuel Lascano; Gonzalo Lo Moro; Gonzalo Carreras; Agustín Rodríguez	Argentina	1:22.608	
8	Andrey Yerguchyov; Bekarys Ramatulla; Igor Ryashentsev; Sergii Tokarnytskyi	Kazakhstan	1:25.519	
9	Colbert Manson; Philip Majumdar; Nathan Humberston; Zach Alva	United States	1:30.389	

=== Finals ===
==== Final B ====
Competitors in this final raced for positions 10 to 18.

Rank	Canoeist	Country	Time
1	Nicholas Matveev; Pierre-Luc Poulin; Laurent Lavigne; Simon McTavish	Canada	1:21.173
2	Aldis Artūrs Vilde; Aleksejs Rumjancevs; Roberts Akmens; Kārlis Dumpis	Latvia	1:21.569
3	Denis Myšák; Samuel Baláž; Csaba Zalka; Adam Botek	Slovakia	1:21.733
4	Max Brown; Zach Ferkins; Kurtis Imrie; Hamish Legarth	New Zealand	1:22.036
5	Bu Tingkai; Wang Congkang; Zhang Dong; Dong Yi	China	1:22.224
6	Cho Gwang-hee; Jo Hyun-hee; Jang Sang-won; Jeong Ju-hwan	South Korea	1:22.368
7	Guillaume Burger; Maxime Beaumont; Quilian Koch; Guillaume Le Floch Decorchemont	France	1:22.405
8	Manfredi Rizza; Alessandro Gnecchi; Giacomo Cinti; Andrea Di Liberto	Italy	1:23.043
9	Jakub Špicar; Jakub Brabec; Jakub Zavřel; Radek Šlouf	Czech Republic	1:28.714

==== Final A ====
Competitors in this final raced for positions 1 to 9, with medals going to the top three.

Rank	Canoeist	Country	Time
1st place, gold medalist(s)	Max Rendschmidt; Max Lemke; Jacob Schopf; Tom Liebscher-Lucz	Germany	1:19.183
2nd place, silver medalist(s)	Bence Nádas; Kolos Csizmadia; István Kuli; Sándor Tótka	Hungary	1:19.570
3rd place, bronze medalist(s)	Oleh Kukharyk; Dmytro Danylenko; Ihor Trunov; Ivan Semykin	Ukraine	1:19.631
4	Riley Fitzsimmons; Pierre van der Westhuyzen; Jackson Collins; Noah Havard	Australia	1:19.905
5	Victor Aasmul; Lasse Madsen; Morten Graversen; Magnus Sibbersen	Denmark	1:20.149
6	Simonas Maldonis; Mindaugas Maldonis; Ignas Navakauskas; Artūras Seja	Lithuania	1:20.164
7	Saúl Craviotto; Carlos Arévalo; Marcus Walz; Rodrigo Germade	Spain	1:20.300
8	Andjelo Dzombeta; Marko Novaković; Stefan Vrdoljak; Vladimir Torubarov	Serbia	1:20.540
9	Jakub Stepun; Przemysław Korsak; Wiktor Leszczyński; Sławomir Witczak	Poland	1:21.383
