= 2021 ICF Canoe Sprint World Championships – Men's K-4 500 metres =

Men's K-4 500 metres at the 2021 ICF Canoe Sprint World Championships
- Venue: Lake Bagsværd
- Location: Copenhagen, Denmark
- Dates: 16–18 September
- Competitors: 80 from 20 nations
- Winning time: 1:20.19

Medalists
gold medal	Oleh Kukharyk; Dmytro Danylenko; Igor Trunov; Ivan Semykin	Ukraine
silver medal	Samuel Baláž; Denis Myšák; Csaba Zalka; Adam Botek	Slovakia
bronze medal	Jakub Špicar; Daniel Havel; Jan Vorel; Radek Šlouf	Czech Republic

The men's K-4 500 metres competition at the 2021 ICF Canoe Sprint World Championships in Copenhagen took place on Lake Bagsværd.

== Schedule ==
The schedule was as follows:

Date	Time	Round
Thursday 16 September 2021	15:03	Heats
Friday 17 September 2021	15:02	Semifinals
Saturday 18 September 2021	09:36	Final B
Saturday 18 September 2021	12:55	Final A

All times are Central European Summer Time (UTC+2)

== Results ==
=== Heats ===
Heat winners advanced directly to the A final.
The next six fastest boats in each heat advanced to the semifinals.

==== Heat 1 ====
Rank	Kayakers	Country	Time	Notes
1	Bence Nádas; Bálint Kopasz; Kolos Csizmadia; Péter István Gál	Hungary	1:23.20	QA
2	Jakub Špicar; Daniel Havel; Jan Vorel; Radek Šlouf	Czech Republic	1:23.47	QS
3	Nebojša Grujić; Marko Novaković; Marko Dragosavljević; Vladimir Torubarov	Serbia	1:24.29	QS
4	Jakub Michalski; Wojciech Tracz; Bartosz Grabowski; Przemysław Korsak	Poland	1:24.94	QS
5	Tamás Gecső; Maximilian Zaremba; Felix Frank; Kostja Stroinski	Germany	1:26.31	QS
6	Charles Smith; Daniel Atkins; Trevor Thomson; Philip Miles	Great Britain	1:27.42	QS
7	Björn Linandek; Anton Andersson; Theodor Orban; David Johansson	Sweden	1:30.53	QS

==== Heat 2 ====
Rank	Kayakers	Country	Time	Notes
1	Oleh Kukharyk; Dmytro Danylenko; Igor Trunov; Ivan Semykin	Ukraine	1:23.03	QA
2	Quilian Koch; Pierrick Bayle; Guillaume Le Floch Decorchemont; Francis Mouget	France	1:25.10	QS
3	Enrique Adán; Carlos Garrote; Juan Oriyés; Cristian Toro	Spain	1:25.79	QS
4	João Ribeiro; Messias Baptista; Kevin Santos; Ruben Boas	Portugal	1:25.88	QS
5	Rasmus Alsbaek; Philip Bryde; Magnus Sibbersen; Victor Aasmul	Denmark	1:26.87	QS
6	Vemund Jensen; Lars Magne Ullvang; Hakeem Teland; Mathias Svoren	Norway	1:27.38	QS
7	Mihail Șerban; Constantin Mironescu; Daniel Burciu; George Săndulescu	Romania	1:27.57	QS

==== Heat 3 ====
Rank	Kayakers	Country	Time	Notes
1	Simonas Maldonis; Mindaugas Maldonis; Ignas Navakauskas; Artūras Seja	Lithuania	1:24.26	QA
2	Samuel Baláž; Denis Myšák; Csaba Zalka; Adam Botek	Slovakia	1:24.75	QS
3	Nicholas Matveev; Pierre-Luc Poulin; Laurent Lavigne; Simon McTavish	Canada	1:26.05	QS
4	Artem Kuzakhmetov; Aleksandr Sergeyev; Oleg Gusev; Maxim Spesivtsev	RCF	1:26.53	QS
5	Uladzislau Litvinau; Dzmitry Natynchyk; Ilya Fedarenka; Mikita Borykau	Belarus	1:27.92	QS
–	Wang Huailong; Yang Junling; Jiang Zhixiang; Wang Yufei	China	DNS	

=== Semifinals ===
Qualification was as follows:

The fastest three boats in each semi advanced to the A final.
The next four fastest boats in each semi, plus the fastest remaining boat advanced to the B final.

==== Semifinal 1 ====
Rank	Kayakers	Country	Time	Notes
1	Jakub Špicar; Daniel Havel; Jan Vorel; Radek Šlouf	Czech Republic	1:22.92	QA
2	Nicholas Matveev; Pierre-Luc Poulin; Laurent Lavigne; Simon McTavish	Canada	1:23.75	QA
3	Enrique Adán; Carlos Garrote; Juan Oriyés; Cristian Toro	Spain	1:23.93	QA
4	Artem Kuzakhmetov; Aleksandr Sergeyev; Oleg Gusev; Maxim Spesivtsev	RCF	1:24.30	QB
5	Jakub Michalski; Wojciech Tracz; Bartosz Grabowski; Przemysław Korsak	Poland	1:24.99	QB
6	Rasmus Alsbaek; Philip Bryde; Magnus Sibbersen; Victor Aasmul	Denmark	1:25.69	QB
7	Charles Smith; Daniel Atkins; Trevor Thomson; Philip Miles	Great Britain	1:26.17	QB
8	Mihail Șerban; Constantin Mironescu; Daniel Burciu; George Săndulescu	Romania	1:27.37	qB

==== Semifinal 2 ====
Rank	Kayakers	Country	Time	Notes
1	Samuel Baláž; Denis Myšák; Csaba Zalka; Adam Botek	Slovakia	1:23.33	QA
2	Nebojša Grujić; Marko Novaković; Marko Dragosavljević; Vladimir Torubarov	Serbia	1:23.86	QA
3	Uladzislau Litvinau; Dzmitry Natynchyk; Ilya Fedarenka; Mikita Borykau	Belarus	1:24.22	QA
4	Quilian Koch; Pierrick Bayle; Guillaume Le Floch Decorchemont; Francis Mouget	France	1:24.24	QB
5	João Ribeiro; Messias Baptista; Kevin Santos; Ruben Boas	Portugal	1:24.44	QB
6	Tamás Gecső; Maximilian Zaremba; Felix Frank; Kostja Stroinski	Germany	1:25.83	QB
7	Vemund Jensen; Lars Magne Ullvang; Hakeem Teland; Mathias Svoren	Norway	1:26.66	QB
8	Björn Linandek; Anton Andersson; Theodor Orban; David Johansson	Sweden	1:29.34	

=== Finals ===
==== Final B ====
Competitors in this final raced for positions 10 to 18.

Rank	Kayakers	Country	Time
1	Jakub Michalski; Wojciech Tracz; Bartosz Grabowski; Przemysław Korsak	Poland	1:22.93
2	João Ribeiro; Messias Baptista; Kevin Santos; Ruben Boas	Portugal	1:23.16
3	Quilian Koch; Pierrick Bayle; Guillaume Le Floch Decorchemont; Francis Mouget	France	1:23.17
4	Rasmus Alsbaek; Philip Bryde; Magnus Sibbersen; Victor Aasmul	Denmark	1:23.92
5	Artem Kuzakhmetov; Aleksandr Sergeyev; Oleg Gusev; Maxim Spesivtsev	RCF	1:24.06
6	Charles Smith; Daniel Atkins; Trevor Thomson; Philip Miles	Great Britain	1:24.89
7	Tamás Gecső; Maximilian Zaremba; Felix Frank; Kostja Stroinski	Germany	1:25.34
8	Vemund Jensen; Lars Magne Ullvang; Hakeem Teland; Mathias Svoren	Norway	1:25.52
9	Mihail Șerban; Constantin Mironescu; Daniel Burciu; George Săndulescu	Romania	1:26.46

==== Final A ====
Competitors raced for positions 1 to 9, with medals going to the top three.

Rank	Kayakers	Country	Time
1st place, gold medalist(s)	Oleh Kukharyk; Dmytro Danylenko; Igor Trunov; Ivan Semykin	Ukraine	1:20.19
2nd place, silver medalist(s)	Samuel Baláž; Denis Myšák; Csaba Zalka; Adam Botek	Slovakia	1:20.59
3rd place, bronze medalist(s)	Jakub Špicar; Daniel Havel; Jan Vorel; Radek Šlouf	Czech Republic	1:20.69
4	Uladzislau Litvinau; Dzmitry Natynchyk; Ilya Fedarenka; Mikita Borykau	Belarus	1:20.71
5	Simonas Maldonis; Mindaugas Maldonis; Ignas Navakauskas; Artūras Seja	Lithuania	1:20.83
6	Nicholas Matveev; Pierre-Luc Poulin; Laurent Lavigne; Simon McTavish	Canada	1:20.96
7	Enrique Adán; Carlos Garrote; Juan Oriyés; Cristian Toro	Spain	1:21.19
8	Nebojša Grujić; Marko Novaković; Marko Dragosavljević; Vladimir Torubarov	Serbia	1:21.29
9	Bence Nádas; Bálint Kopasz; Kolos Csizmadia; Péter István Gál	Hungary	1:21.77
