= Canoe sprint at the 2023 European Games – Men's K-4 500 metres =

Men's K-4 500 metres at the 2023 European Games
- Venue: Kryspinów Waterway
- Date: 21, 23 June
- Competitors: 60 from 15 nations
- Teams: 15
- Winning time: 1:19.964

Medalists
gold medal	Carlos Arévalo; Saúl Craviotto; Rodrigo Germade; Marcus Walz	Spain
silver medal	Dmytro Danylenko; Oleh Kukharyk; Ivan Semykin; Ihor Trunov	Ukraine
bronze medal	Anđelo Džombeta; Marko Novaković; Vladimir Torubarov; Stefan Vrdoljak	Serbia

The men's K-4 500 metres canoe sprint competition at the 2023 European Games took place on 21 and 23 June at the Kryspinów Waterway.

== Schedule ==
All times are local (UTC+2).

Date	Time	Round
Wednesday, 21 June 2023	9:24	Heats
Wednesday, 21 June 2023	15:46	Semifinal
Friday, 23 June 2023	14:25	Final

== Results ==
=== Heats ===
==== Heat 1 ====
Rank	Kayakers	Country	Time	Notes
1	István Kuli; Kolos Csizmadia; Bence Nádas; Sándor Tótka	Hungary	1:21.238	QF
2	Oleh Kukharyk; Dmytro Danylenko; Ihor Trunov; Ivan Semykin	Ukraine	1:21.268	QF
3	Manfredi Rizza; Alessandro Gnecchi; Giacomo Cinti; Andrea Di Liberto	Italy	1:21.288	QF
4	Jakub Špicar; Jakub Brabec; Jakub Zavřel; Radek Šlouf	Czech Republic	1:21.422	QS
5	Max Rendschmidt; Tom Liebscher; Jacob Schopf; Max Lemke	Germany	1:21.615	QS
6	Anđelo Džombeta; Marko Novaković; Stefan Vrdoljak; Vladimir Torubarov	Serbia	1:23.355	QS
7	Fernando Pimenta; Emanuel Silva; David Varela; Kevin Santos	Portugal	1:23.505	QS
8	Joakim Lindberg; Martin Nathell; Theodor Orban; Petter Menning	Sweden	1:25.239	qS

==== Heat 2 ====
Rank	Kayakers	Country	Time	Notes
1	Saúl Craviotto; Carlos Arévalo; Marcus Walz; Rodrigo Germade	Spain	1:20.713	QF
2	Aldis Vilde; Aleksejs Rumjancevs; Roberts Akmens; Kārlis Dumpis	Latvia	1:21.373	QF
3	Simonas Maldonis; Mindaugas Maldonis; Ignas Navakauskas; Artūras Seja	Lithuania	1:21.516	QF
4	Guillaume Burger; Quilian Koch; Maxime Beaumont; Guillaume Le Floch Decorchemont	France	1:21.856	QS
5	Victor Aasmul; Lasse Madsen; Morten Graversen; Magnus Sibbersen	Denmark	1:21.866	QS
6	Samuel Baláž; Denis Myšák; Csaba Zalka; Adam Botek	Slovakia	1:22.510	QS
7	Jakub Stepun; Przemysław Korsak; Jakub Michalski; Slawomir Witczak	Poland	1:22.523	QS

=== Semifinal ===
Rank	Kayakers	Country	Time	Notes
1	Max Rendschmidt; Tom Liebscher; Jacob Schopf; Max Lemke	Germany	1:22.321	QF
2	Anđelo Džombeta; Marko Novaković; Stefan Vrdoljak; Vladimir Torubarov	Serbia	1:22.498	QF
3	Jakub Špicar; Jakub Brabec; Jakub Zavřel; Radek Šlouf	Czech Republic	1:22.645	QF
4	Jakub Stepun; Przemysław Korsak; Jakub Michalski; Slawomir Witczak	Poland	1:22.928	
5	Guillaume Burger; Quilian Koch; Maxime Beaumont; Guillaume Le Floch Decorchemont	France	1:23.248	
6	Samuel Baláž; Denis Myšák; Csaba Zalka; Adam Botek	Slovakia	1:23.285	
7	Fernando Pimenta; Emanuel Silva; David Varela; Kevin Santos	Portugal	1:24.045	
8	Victor Aasmul; Lasse Madsen; Morten Graversen; Magnus Sibbersen	Denmark	1:24.522	
9	Joakim Lindberg; Martin Nathell; Theodor Orban; Petter Menning	Sweden	1:26.125	

=== Final ===
Rank	Kayakers	Country	Time
1st place, gold medalist(s)	Saúl Craviotto; Carlos Arévalo; Marcus Walz; Rodrigo Germade	Spain	1:19.964
2nd place, silver medalist(s)	Oleh Kukharyk; Dmytro Danylenko; Ihor Trunov; Ivan Semykin	Ukraine	1:20.500
3rd place, bronze medalist(s)	Anđelo Džombeta; Marko Novaković; Stefan Vrdoljak; Vladimir Torubarov	Serbia	1:20.800
4	Manfredi Rizza; Alessandro Gnecchi; Giacomo Cinti; Andrea Di Liberto	Italy	1:20.848
5	Max Rendschmidt; Tom Liebscher; Jacob Schopf; Max Lemke	Germany	1:20.972
6	István Kuli; Kolos Csizmadia; Bence Nádas; Sándor Tótka	Hungary	1:20.980
7	Jakub Špicar; Jakub Brabec; Jakub Zavřel; Radek Šlouf	Czech Republic	1:21.178
8	Aldis Vilde; Aleksejs Rumjancevs; Roberts Akmens; Kārlis Dumpis	Latvia	1:21.758
9	Simonas Maldonis; Mindaugas Maldonis; Ignas Navakauskas; Artūras Seja	Lithuania	1:21.778
