= 2021 ICF Canoe Sprint World Championships – Men's K-2 500 metres =

Men's K-2 500 metres at the 2021 ICF Canoe Sprint World Championships
- Venue: Lake Bagsværd
- Location: Copenhagen, Denmark
- Dates: 17–19 September
- Competitors: 50 from 25 nations
- Winning time: 1:29.04

Medalists
gold medal	Marcus Walz; Rodrigo Germade	Spain
silver medal	Tobias-Pascal Schultz; Martin Hiller	Germany
bronze medal	Samuel Baláž; Denis Myšák	Slovakia

The men's K-2 500 metres competition at the 2021 ICF Canoe Sprint World Championships in Copenhagen took place on Lake Bagsværd.

== Schedule ==
The schedule was as follows:

Date	Time	Round
Friday 17 September 2021	10:15	Heats
Friday 17 September 2021	16:43	Semifinals
Sunday 19 September 2021	10:36	Final B
Sunday 19 September 2021	11:51	Final A

All times are Central European Summer Time (UTC+2)

== Results ==
=== Heats ===
Heat winners advanced directly to the A final.
The next six fastest boats in each heat advanced to the semifinals.

==== Heat 1 ====
Rank	Kayakers	Country	Time	Notes
1	Dmytro Danylenko; Oleh Kukharyk	Ukraine	1:33.33	QA
2	Nicholas Matveev; Simon McTavish	Canada	1:33.53	QS
3	Uladzislau Litvinau; Dzmitry Natynchyk	Belarus	1:36.37	QS
4	Radoslav Stefanov; Veselin Valchov	Bulgaria	1:37.53	QS
5	Rok Šmit; Vid Debeljak	Slovenia	1:37.91	QS
6	Flavio Spurio; Andrea Schera	Italy	1:38.06	QS
7	Jeremy Hakala; Joona Mäntynen	Finland	1:38.53	QS
8	Andjelo Dzombeta; Nikola Rasulić	Serbia	1:39.27	
9	Lasse Lotsberg; Kristoffet Mjelstad	Norway	1:39.35	

==== Heat 2 ====
Rank	Kayakers	Country	Time	Notes
1	Samuel Baláž; Denis Myšák	Slovakia	1:33.60	QA
2	Marcus Walz; Rodrigo Germade	Spain	1:33.61	QS
3	René Holten Poulsen; Victor Aasmul	Denmark	1:33.70	QS
4	Bram Sikkens; Artuur Peters	Belgium	1:34.89	QS
5	Dennis Kernen; Martin Nathell	Sweden	1:34.91	QS
6	Mindaugas Maldonis; Andrej Olijnik	Lithuania	1:35.64	QS
7	Oleg Gusev; Maxim Spesivtsev	RCF	1:35.71	QS
8	Filip Weckwert; Przemysław Korsak	Poland	1:36.33	

==== Heat 3 ====
Rank	Kayakers	Country	Time	Notes
1	Tobias-Pascal Schultz; Martin Hiller	Germany	1:32.72	QA
2	Csaba Erdőssy; Bálint Kopasz	Hungary	1:33.41	QS
3	Guillaume Burger; Maxime Beaumont	France	1:35.56	QS
4	Tomas Sobisek; Jakub Brabec	Czech Republic	1:36.39	QS
5	Aldis Arturs Vilde; Aleksejs Rumjancevs	Latvia	1:36.96	QS
6	Daniel Atkins; Trevor Thomson	Great Britain	1:37.51	QS
7	Manuel Micaz; Gonzalo Carreras	Argentina	1:37.55	QS
8	Akira Komata; Seiji Komatsu	Japan	1:39.96	

=== Semifinals ===
Qualification was as follows:

The fastest three boats in each semi advanced to the A final.
The next four fastest boats in each semi, plus the fastest remaining boat advanced to the B final.

==== Semifinal 1 ====
Rank	Kayakers	Country	Time	Notes
1	René Holten Poulsen; Victor Aasmul	Denmark	1:31.74	QA
2	Nicholas Matveev; Simon McTavish	Canada	1:32.20	QA
3	Dennis Kernen; Martin Nathell	Sweden	1:32.41	QA
4	Guillaume Burger; Maxime Beaumont	France	1:32.63	QB
5	Oleg Gusev; Maxim Spesivtsev	RCF	1:33.25	QB
6	Daniel Atkins; Trevor Thomson	Great Britain	1:34.53	QB
7	Tomas Sobisek; Jakub Brabec	Czech Republic	1:34.91	QB
8	Flavio Spurio; Andrea Schera	Italy	1:36.05	
9	Radoslav Stefanov; Veselin Valchov	Bulgaria	1:38.85	

==== Semifinal 2 ====
Rank	Kayakers	Country	Time	Notes
1	Csaba Erdőssy; Bálint Kopasz	Hungary	1:31.01	QA
2	Aldis Arturs Vilde; Aleksejs Rumjancevs	Latvia	1:31.28	QA
3	Marcus Walz; Rodrigo Germade	Spain	1:31.29	QA
4	Mindaugas Maldonis; Andrej Olijnik	Lithuania	1:31.48	QB
5	Uladzislau Litvinau; Dzmitry Natynchyk	Belarus	1:31.75	QB
6	Bram Sikkens; Artuur Peters	Belgium	1:32.92	QB
7	Manuel Micaz; Gonzalo Carreras	Argentina	1:33.79	QB
8	Jeremy Hakala; Joona Mäntynen	Finland	1:35.05	qB
9	Rok Šmit; Vid Debeljak	Slovenia	1:35.72	

=== Finals ===
==== Final B ====
Competitors in this final raced for positions 10 to 18.

Rank	Kayakers	Country	Time
1	Uladzislau Litvinau; Dzmitry Natynchyk	Belarus	1:30.70
2	Mindaugas Maldonis; Andrej Olijnik	Lithuania	1:30.78
3	Guillaume Burger; Maxime Beaumont	France	1:31.61
4	Tomas Sobisek; Jakub Brabec	Czech Republic	1:31.88
5	Manuel Micaz; Gonzalo Carreras	Argentina	1:31.98
6	Daniel Atkins; Trevor Thomson	Great Britain	1:32.58
7	Bram Sikkens; Artuur Peters	Belgium	1:32.60
8	Jeremy Hakala; Joona Mäntynen	Finland	1:36.54
9	Oleg Gusev; Maxim Spesivtsev	RCF	1:40.90

==== Final A ====
Competitors raced for positions 1 to 9, with medals going to the top three.

Rank	Kayakers	Country	Time
1st place, gold medalist(s)	Marcus Walz; Rodrigo Germade	Spain	1:29.04
2nd place, silver medalist(s)	Tobias-Pascal Schultz; Martin Hiller	Germany	1:30.01
3rd place, bronze medalist(s)	Samuel Baláž; Denis Myšák	Slovakia	1:30.09
4	Csaba Erdőssy; Bálint Kopasz	Hungary	1:30.47
5	Dmytro Danylenko; Oleh Kukharyk	Ukraine	1:30.54
6	Nicholas Matveev; Simon McTavish	Canada	1:30.63
7	René Holten Poulsen; Victor Aasmul	Denmark	1:31.13
8	Aldis Arturs Vilde; Aleksejs Rumjancevs	Latvia	1:31.21
9	Dennis Kernen; Martin Nathell	Sweden	1:32.40
