= Canoe sprint at the 2023 European Games =

- Venue: Kryspinów Waterway
- Dates: 21–24 June
- Competitors: 282 from 35 nations

Canoe sprint events at the 2023 European Games were held at the Kryspinów Waterway. A total of 16 medal events took place, 7 for men and women each and 2 mixed events.

It was the third time that canoe sprint was in the program of European Games.

== Medal table ==
* Host nation (Poland)

Rank	NOC	Gold	Silver	Bronze	Total
1	Ukraine	3	2	0	5
2	Poland*	3	1	1	5
3	Spain	2	3	2	7
4	Denmark	2	2	1	5
5	Portugal	2	1	1	4
6	Hungary	1	1	3	5
7	Czech Republic	1	0	0	1
7	Italy	1	0	0	1
7	Lithuania	1	0	0	1
10	Germany	0	2	2	4
11	Serbia	0	1	4	5
12	Georgia	0	1	0	1
12	Romania	0	1	0	1
12	Sweden	0	1	0	1
15	Latvia	0	0	1	1
15	Moldova	0	0	1	1
Totals (16 entries)		16	16	16	48

== Medal summary ==
=== Men ===
Event	Gold	Silver	Bronze
C-1 200 m	Henrikas Žustautas; Lithuania	Zaza Nadiradze; Georgia	Pablo Graña; Spain
C-1 500 m	Martin Fuksa; Czech Republic	Cătălin Chirilă; Romania	Serghei Tarnovschi; Moldova
C-2 500 m	Italy; Carlo Tacchini; Gabriele Casadei	Spain; Cayetano García; Pablo Martínez	Poland; Aleksander Kitewski; Norman Zezula
K-1 200 m	Messias Baptista; Portugal	Petter Menning; Sweden	Roberts Akmens; Latvia
K-1 500 m	Ádám Varga; Hungary	Fernando Pimenta; Portugal	Marko Dragosavljević; Serbia
K-2 500 m	Ukraine; Oleh Kukharyk; Ihor Trunov	Germany; Felix Frank; Martin Hiller	Serbia; Marko Dragosavljević; Ervin Holpert
K-4 500 m	Spain; Carlos Arévalo; Rodrigo Germade; Saúl Craviotto; Marcus Walz	Ukraine; Dmytro Danylenko; Oleh Kukharyk; Ivan Semykin; Ihor Trunov	Serbia; Anđelo Džombeta; Marko Novaković; Vladimir Torubarov; Stefan Vrdoljak

=== Women ===
Event	Gold	Silver	Bronze
C-1 200 m	Dorota Borowska; Poland	Liudmyla Luzan; Ukraine	María Corbera; Spain
C-1 500 m	Liudmyla Luzan; Ukraine	María Corbera; Spain	Ágnes Kiss; Hungary
C-2 500 m	Ukraine; Liudmyla Luzan; Valeriia Tereta	Spain; María Corbera; Antía Jácome	Hungary; Giada Bragato; Bianka Nagy
K-1 200 m	Emma Jørgensen; Denmark	Milica Novaković; Serbia	Francisca Laia; Portugal
K-1 500 m	Emma Jørgensen; Denmark	Alida Dóra Gazsó; Hungary	Milica Novaković; Serbia
K-2 500 m	Poland; Karolina Naja; Anna Puławska	Denmark; Emma Jørgensen; Frederikke Matthiesen	Hungary; Tamara Csipes; Alida Dóra Gazsó
K-4 500 m	Poland; Adrianna Kąkol; Karolina Naja; Anna Puławska; Dominika Putto	Germany; Jule Hake; Katinka Hofmann; Paulina Paszek; Lena Röhlings	Denmark; Bolette Nyvang Iversen; Katrine Jensen; Frederikke Matthiesen; Sara Milthers

=== Mixed ===
Event	Gold	Silver	Bronze
C-2 200 m	Spain; Antía Jácome; Pablo Graña	Poland; Aleksander Kitewski; Sylwia Szczerbińska	Germany; Nico Pickert; Annika Loske
K-2 200 m	Portugal; Teresa Portela; Kevin Santos	Denmark; Emma Jørgensen; Magnus Sibbersen	Germany; Lena Röhlings; Jacob Schopf
