= 2022 ICF Canoe Sprint World Championships – Men's K-2 500 metres =

Men's K-2 500 metres at the 2022 ICF Canoe Sprint World Championships
- Venue: Lake Banook
- Location: Dartmouth, Canada
- Dates: 4–7 August
- Competitors: 58 from 29 nations
- Winning time: 1:34.98

Medalists
gold medal	Bence Nádas; Bálint Kopasz	Hungary
silver medal	Mindaugas Maldonis; Andrejus Olijnikas	Lithuania
bronze medal	Jean van der Westhuyzen; Thomas Green	Australia

The men's K-2 500 metres competition at the 2022 ICF Canoe Sprint World Championships in Dartmouth took place on Lake Banook.

== Schedule ==
The schedule is as follows:

Date	Time	Round
Thursday 4 August 2022	14:48	Heats
Friday 5 August 2022	16:18	Semifinals
Sunday 7 August 2022	10:41	Final B
Sunday 7 August 2022	12:56	Final A

== Results ==
=== Heats ===
The six fastest boats in each heat, plus the three fastest seventh-place boats advanced to the semifinals.

==== Heat 1 ====
Rank	Canoeist	Country	Time	Notes
1	Felix Frank; Moritz Florstedt	Germany	1:37.23	QS
2	Zhang Dong; Wang Chi	China	1:38.93	QS
3	Mindaugas Maldonis; Andrejus Olijnikas	Lithuania	1:39.00	QS
4	Bram Sikkens; Artuur Peters	Belgium	1:39.94	QS
5	Dennis Kernen; Martin Nathell	Sweden	1:41.14	QS
6	Roi Rodríguez; Carlos Pérez	Spain	1:43.10	QS
7	Alberto Fragoza; José Alcazar	Mexico	1:47.00	qS

==== Heat 2 ====
Rank	Canoeist	Country	Time	Notes
1	Oleh Kukharyk; Ihor Trunov	Ukraine	1:36.52	QS
2	Jakub Špicar; Daniel Havel	Czech Republic	1:37.52	QS
3	Erik Vlček; Adam Botek	Slovakia	1:37.72	QS
4	Alessandro Gnecchi; Andrea Di Liberto	Italy	1:38.23	QS
5	Erick Verdier; Sebastian Delgado	Uruguay	1:42.43	QS
6	Akihiro Inoue; Iori Miura	Japan	1:42.92	QS
7	Weng Wen-sen; Lin Yung-chieh	Chinese Taipei	1:43.79	qS

==== Heat 3 ====
Rank	Canoeist	Country	Time	Notes
1	João Ribeiro; Messias Baptista	Portugal	1:36.96	QS
2	Bence Nádas; Bálint Kopasz	Hungary	1:37.65	QS
3	René Poulsen; Victor Aasmul	Denmark	1:38.30	QS
4	Jonas Ecker; Aaron Small	United States	1:39.30	QS
5	Max Brown; Kurtis Imrie	New Zealand	1:41.02	QS
6	Eetu Kolehmainen; Jeremy Hakala	Finland	1:45.39	QS
7	Guang Teo; Brandon Ooi	Singapore	1:47.81	qS

==== Heat 4 ====
Rank	Canoeist	Country	Time	Notes
1	Jean van der Westhuyzen; Thomas Green	Australia	1:38.53	QS
2	Pierre-Luc Poulin; Simon McTavish	Canada	1:39.59	QS
3	Aldis Vilde; Aleksejs Rumjancevs	Latvia	1:39.69	QS
4	Jakub Stepun; Bartosz Grabowski	Poland	1:39.73	QS
5	Gonzalo Benassi; Gonzalo Carreras	Argentina	1:41.52	QS
6	Vid Debeljak; Rok Šmit	Slovenia	1:47.11	QS
7	Rodrigo González; Christian Colón	Puerto Rico	2:11.91	
	Matthew Robinson; Nicolas Robinson	Trinidad and Tobago	DNS	

=== Semifinals ===
Qualification in each semi was as follows:

The fastest three boats advanced to the A final.
The next three fastest boats advanced to the B final.

==== Semifinal 1 ====
Rank	Canoeist	Country	Time	Notes
1	Jean van der Westhuyzen; Thomas Green	Australia	1:34.04	QA
2	Oleh Kukharyk; Ihor Trunov	Ukraine	1:34.66	QA
3	Jonas Ecker; Aaron Small	United States	1:35.07	QA
4	René Poulsen; Victor Aasmul	Denmark	1:35.81	QB
5	Gonzalo Benassi; Gonzalo Carreras	Argentina	1:36.03	QB
6	Zhang Dong; Wang Chi	China	1:36.33	QB
7	Roi Rodríguez; Carlos Pérez	Spain	1:38.00	
8	Akihiro Inoue; Iori Miura	Japan	1:42.07	
9	Weng Wen-sen; Lin Yung-chieh	Chinese Taipei	1:44.38	

==== Semifinal 2 ====
Rank	Canoeist	Country	Time	Notes
1	João Ribeiro; Messias Baptista	Portugal	1:33.95	QA
2	Mindaugas Maldonis; Andrejus Olijnikas	Lithuania	1:34.09	QA
3	Erik Vlček; Adam Botek	Slovakia	1:34.69	QA
4	Jakub Stepun; Bartosz Grabowski	Poland	1:35.22	QB
5	Pierre-Luc Poulin; Simon McTavish	Canada	1:35.30	QB
6	Alessandro Gnecchi; Andrea Di Liberto	Italy	1:36.05	QB
7	Dennis Kernen; Martin Nathell	Sweden	1:37.57	
8	Eetu Kolehmainen; Jeremy Hakala	Finland	1:40.14	
9	Alberto Fragoza; José Alcazar	Mexico	1:42.55	

==== Semifinal 3 ====
Rank	Canoeist	Country	Time	Notes
1	Bence Nádas; Bálint Kopasz	Hungary	1:34.51	QA
2	Felix Frank; Moritz Florstedt	Germany	1:34.57	QA
3	Jakub Špicar; Daniel Havel	Czech Republic	1:34.82	QA
4	Aldis Vilde; Aleksejs Rumjancevs	Latvia	1:35.13	QB
5	Bram Sikkens; Artuur Peters	Belgium	1:35.92	QB
6	Max Brown; Kurtis Imrie	New Zealand	1:36.99	QB
7	Erick Verdier; Sebastian Delgado	Uruguay	1:40.61	
8	Vid Debeljak; Rok Šmit	Slovenia	1:40.68	
9	Guang Teo; Brandon Ooi	Singapore	1:44.43	

=== Finals ===
==== Final B ====
Competitors in this final raced for positions 10 to 18.

Rank	Canoeist	Country	Time
1	Pierre-Luc Poulin; Simon McTavish	Canada	1:35.06
2	René Poulsen; Victor Aasmul	Denmark	1:35.62
3	Jakub Stepun; Bartosz Grabowski	Poland	1:35.79
4	Alessandro Gnecchi; Andrea Di Liberto	Italy	1:36.32
5	Aldis Vilde; Aleksejs Rumjancevs	Latvia	1:36.36
6	Gonzalo Benassi; Gonzalo Carreras	Argentina	1:36.45
7	Bram Sikkens; Artuur Peters	Belgium	1:36.46
8	Zhang Dong; Wang Chi	China	1:36.61
9	Max Brown; Kurtis Imrie	New Zealand	1:37.60

==== Final A ====
Competitors in this final raced for positions 1 to 9, with medals going to the top three.

Rank	Canoeist	Country	Time
1st place, gold medalist(s)	Bence Nádas; Bálint Kopasz	Hungary	1:34.98
2nd place, silver medalist(s)	Mindaugas Maldonis; Andrejus Olijnikas	Lithuania	1:35.56
3rd place, bronze medalist(s)	Jean van der Westhuyzen; Thomas Green	Australia	1:35.85
4	Jakub Špicar; Daniel Havel	Czech Republic	1:35.99
5	João Ribeiro; Messias Baptista	Portugal	1:37.42
6	Oleh Kukharyk; Ihor Trunov	Ukraine	1:37.53
7	Jonas Ecker; Aaron Small	United States	1:37.60
8	Felix Frank; Moritz Florstedt	Germany	1:37.85
9	Erik Vlček; Adam Botek	Slovakia	1:39.63
