= 2023 ICF Canoe Sprint World Championships – Men's K-2 500 metres =

Men's K-2 500 metres at the 2023 ICF Canoe Sprint World Championships
- Venue: Sportpark Duisburg
- Location: Duisburg, Germany
- Dates: 24-27 August
- Competitors: 90 from 45 nations
- Winning time: 1:29.037

Medalists
gold medal	Joao Ribeiro; Messias Baptista	Portugal
silver medal	Bence Nádas; Bálint Kopasz	Hungary
bronze medal	Adrián del Río; Rodrigo Germade	Spain

The men's K-2 500 metres competition at the 2023 ICF Canoe Sprint World Championships in Duisburg took place in Sportpark Duisburg.

== Schedule ==
The schedule is as follows:

Date	Time	Round
Thursday 24 August 2023	09:37	Heats
Saturday 26 August 2023	15:26	Semifinals
Sunday 27 August 2023	10:22	Final C
Sunday 27 August 2023	10:28	Final B
Sunday 27 August 2023	11:50	Final A

== Results ==
=== Heats ===
The four fastest boats in each heat and three fastest 5th ranked boats advanced directly to the semi finals.

==== Heat 1 ====
Rank	Canoeist	Country	Time	Notes
1	Adrián del Río; Rodrigo Germade	Spain	1:30.320	QS
2	Felix Frank; Martin Hiller	Germany	1:30.364	QS
3	Jakub Špicar; Daniel Havel	Czech Republic	1:31.569	QS
4	Gunnar Nydal Eide; Nicolai Nierenberg Lønning	Norway	1:33.267	QS
5	Etienne Hubert; Francis Mouget	France	1:34.219	QS
6	Nitin Verma; Vishnu Reghunath	India	1:42.555	
7	Abdelmajid Jabbour; Achraf Elaidi	Morocco	1:46.008	
	Cristian Canache; Ray Acuna	Venezuela	DNS	
	Amosse Daimane; Joaquim Manhique	Mozambique	DNS	

==== Heat 2 ====
Rank	Canoeist	Country	Time	Notes
1	Bence Nádas; Bálint Kopasz	Hungary	1:30.411	QS
2	Cho Gwang-hee; Jang Sang-won	South Korea	1:30.762	QS
3	Aldis Artūrs Vilde; Aleksejs Rumjancevs	Latvia	1:30.931	QS
4	Joakim Lindberg; Martin Nathell	Sweden	1:31.468	QS
5	Angel Stoyanov; Veselin Valchov	Bulgaria	1:33.713	QS
6	Robert Benitez; Yan Same	Cuba	1:35.562	
7	Igor Ryashentsev; Sergii Tokarnytskyi	Kazakhstan	1:35.685	
8	Irwan Irwan; Indra Hidayat	Indonesia	1:40.594	

==== Heat 3 ====
Rank	Canoeist	Country	Time	Notes
1	Ervin Holpert; Marko Dragosavljević	Serbia	1:29.292	QS
2	Mindaugas Maldonis; Andrej Olijnik	Lithuania	1:29.588	QS
3	Vagner Junior Souta; Edson Isaias Freitas da Silva	Brazil	1:32.543	QS
4	Erik Vlček; Adam Botek	Slovakia	1:33.029	QS
5	Benjamin Cabrera; Matthew Collinge	Great Britain	1:35.136	
6	Ahmed Elbedwihy; Ahmed Mohamed	Egypt	1:43.562	
7	So Pak Yin; Cheung Cheuk Ho	Hong Kong	1:44.209	
8	Jairo Domingos; Simao Camazaulo	Angola	1:45.265	

==== Heat 4 ====
Rank	Canoeist	Country	Time	Notes
1	Jean van der Westhuyzen; Thomas Green	Australia	1:29.238	QS
2	Simon Schuldt-Jensen; Morten Graversen	Denmark	1:29.892	QS
3	Jakub Stepun; Przemysław Korsak	Poland	1:30.298	QS
4	Aaron Small; Jonas Ecker	United States	1:30.949	QS
5	Erlan Sultangaziev; Rysbek Tolomushev	Kyrgyzstan	1:33.346	QS
6	Wael Jabbar; Qays Ahmed	Iraq	1:35.354	
7	Luis López; Ruben Londoño	Colombia	1:38.746	

==== Heat 5 ====
Rank	Canoeist	Country	Time	Notes
1	Pierre-Luc Poulin; Simon McTavish	Canada	1:30.726	QS
2	Joao Ribeiro; Messias Baptista	Portugal	1:30.781	QS
3	Oleksandr Syromiatnykov; Oleksandr Zaitsev	Ukraine	1:31.185	QS
4	Eetu Kolehmainen; Jeremy Hakala	Finland	1:32.612	QS
5	Lin Yong-bo; Lin Yung-chieh	Chinese Taipei	1:34.394	
6	Kevin Poljans; Alexander Pekhenko	Estonia	1:38.060	
7	Eddy Barranco; Rodrigo González	Puerto Rico	1:52.828	

==== Heat 6 ====
Rank	Canoeist	Country	Time	Notes
1	Bram Sikkens; Artuur Peters	Belgium	1:30.662	QS
2	Francesco Lanciotti; Giovanni Penato	Italy	1:31.204	QS
3	Chen Jintao; Wang Chi	China	1:32.286	QS
4	Matevž Manfreda; Anze Pikon	Slovenia	1:33.465	QS
5	Nicholas Weeks; Henry van der Walt	South Africa	1:35.311	
6	Praison Buasamrong; Methasit Sitthipharat	Thailand	1:37.354	
7	Ayoub Haidra; Ryad Bentouati	Algeria	1:47.644	
8	Edgar Tutyan; Artur Akishin	Armenia	1:49.883	

=== Semifinals ===
The fastest three boats in each semi advanced to the A final.
The next three fastest boats in each semifinal boats advanced to the B final.
Rest boats advanced to the C final.

==== Semifinal 1 ====
Rank	Canoeist	Country	Time	Notes
1	Mindaugas Maldonis; Andrej Olijnik	Lithuania	1:28.350	QA
2	Adrián del Río; Rodrigo Germade	Spain	1:28.434	QA
3	Jean van der Westhuyzen; Thomas Green	Australia	1:28.449	QA
4	Aldis Artūrs Vilde; Aleksejs Rumjancevs	Latvia	1:29.018	QB
5	Aaron Small; Jonas Ecker	United States	1:30.494	QB
6	Francesco Lanciotti; Giovanni Penato	Italy	1:31.010	QB
7	Gunnar Nydal Eide; Nicolai Nierenberg Lønning	Norway	1:32.258	QC
8	Oleksandr Syromiatnykov; Oleksandr Zaitsev	Ukraine	1:33.530	QC
9	Erlan Sultangaziev; Rysbek Tolomushev	Kyrgyzstan	1:34.065	QC

==== Semifinal 2 ====
Rank	Canoeist	Country	Time	Notes
1	Felix Frank; Martin Hiller	Germany	1:29.463	QA
2	Bence Nádas; Bálint Kopasz	Hungary	1:29.651	QA
3	Pierre-Luc Poulin; Simon McTavish	Canada	1:30.734	QA
4	Joakim Lindberg; Martin Nathell	Sweden	1:30.902	QB
5	Eetu Kolehmainen; Jeremy Hakala	Finland	1:31.722	QB
6	Vagner Junior Souta; Edson Isaias Freitas da Silva	Brazil	1:32.725	QB
7	Angel Stoyanov; Veselin Valchov	Bulgaria	1:33.265	QC
8	Chen Jintao; Wang Chi	China	1:33.932	QC
9	Simon Schuldt-Jensen; Morten Graversen	Denmark	1:35.851	QC

==== Semifinal 3 ====
Rank	Canoeist	Country	Time	Notes
1	Joao Ribeiro; Messias Baptista	Portugal	1:29.148	QA
2	Jakub Špicar; Daniel Havel	Czech Republic	1:29.210	QA
3	Ervin Holpert; Marko Dragosavljević	Serbia	1:29.378	QA
4	Erik Vlček; Adam Botek	Slovakia	1:29.483	QB
5	Bram Sikkens; Artuur Peters	Belgium	1:29.784	QB
6	Cho Gwang-hee; Jang Sang-won	South Korea	1:29.820	QB
7	Matevž Manfreda; Anze Pikon	Slovenia	1:30.690	QC
8	Etienne Hubert; Francis Mouget	France	1:32.063	QC
9	Jakub Stepun; Przemysław Korsak	Poland	1:33.900	QC

=== Finals ===
==== Final C ====
Competitors in this final raced for positions 19 to 27.

Rank	Canoeist	Country	Time	Notes
1	Jakub Stepun; Przemysław Korsak	Poland	1:31.077	
2	Etienne Hubert; Francis Mouget	France	1:31.597	
3	Simon Schuldt-Jensen; Morten Graversen	Denmark	1:31.884	
4	Gunnar Nydal Eide; Nicolai Nierenberg Lønning	Norway	1:32.455	
5	Matevž Manfreda; Anze Pikon	Slovenia	1:32.887	
6	Oleksandr Syromiatnykov; Oleksandr Zaitsev	Ukraine	1:32.942	
7	Chen Jintao; Wang Chi	China	1:32.953	
8	Erlan Sultangaziev; Rysbek Tolomushev	Kyrgyzstan	1:33.892	
9	Angel Stoyanov; Veselin Valchov	Bulgaria	1:34.499	

==== Final B ====
Competitors in this final raced for positions 10 to 18.

Rank	Canoeist	Country	Time	Notes
1	Aldis Artūrs Vilde; Aleksejs Rumjancevs	Latvia	1:29.237	
2	Erik Vlček; Adam Botek	Slovakia	1:29.453	
3	Bram Sikkens; Artuur Peters	Belgium	1:30.676	
4	Joakim Lindberg; Martin Nathell	Sweden	1:30.883	
5	Francesco Lanciotti; Giovanni Penato	Italy	1:31.136	
6	Aaron Small; Jonas Ecker	United States	1:32.067	
7	Eetu Kolehmainen; Jeremy Hakala	Finland	1:32.067	
8	Vagner Junior Souta; Edson Isaias Freitas da Silva	Brazil	1:32.461	
	Cho Gwang-hee; Jang Sang-won	South Korea	DNS	

==== Final A ====
Competitors in this final raced for positions 1 to 9, with medals going to the top three.

Rank	Canoeist	Country	Time	Notes
1st place, gold medalist(s)	Joao Ribeiro; Messias Baptista	Portugal	1:29.037	
2nd place, silver medalist(s)	Bence Nádas; Bálint Kopasz	Hungary	1:29.184	
3rd place, bronze medalist(s)	Adrián del Río; Rodrigo Germade	Spain	1:29.389	
4	Jean van der Westhuyzen; Thomas Green	Australia	1:29.465	
5	Jakub Špicar; Daniel Havel	Czech Republic	1:29.842	
6	Felix Frank; Martin Hiller	Germany	1:29.860	
7	Mindaugas Maldonis; Andrej Olijnik	Lithuania	1:29.874	
8	Ervin Holpert; Marko Dragosavljević	Serbia	1:29.937	
9	Pierre-Luc Poulin; Simon McTavish	Canada	1:30.511	
