= Laurent Lavigne =

Laurent Lavigne may refer to:

- Laurent Lavigne (politician)
- Laurent Lavigne (canoeist)
