= Simon McTavish =

Simon McTavish may refer to

- Simon McTavish (canoeist) (born 1996), Canadian sprint kayaker
- Simon McTavish (fur trader) (1750–1804), founding partner of the North West Company
