= Canoeing at the 2023 Pan American Games – Men's K-4 500 metres =

Men's K-4 500 metres at the 2023 Pan American Games
- Venue: Laguna Grande
- Dates: November 4
- Competitors: 28 from 7 nations
- Winning time: 1:20.80

Medalists
Gold medal	Agustín Vernice; Manuel Lascano; Gonzalo Benassi; Gonzalo Carreras	Argentina
Silver medal	Nicholas Matveev; Pierre-Luc Poulin; Laurent Lavigne; Simon McTavish	Canada
Bronze medal	Nathan Humberton; Sean Talbert; Cole Jones; Augustus Cook	United States

The men's K-4 500 metres competition of the canoeing events at the 2023 Pan American Games was held on November 4 at the Laguna Grande in San Pedro de la Paz, Chile.

== Schedule ==
Date	Time	Round
November 4, 2023	10:25	Final

== Results ==
The results were as follows:

Rank	Name	Nation	Time
1st place, gold medalist(s)	Agustín Vernice; Manuel Lascano; Gonzalo Benassi; Gonzalo Carreras	Argentina	1:20.80
2nd place, silver medalist(s)	Nicholas Matveev; Pierre-Luc Poulin; Laurent Lavigne; Simon McTavish	Canada	1:21.28
3rd place, bronze medalist(s)	Nathan Humberton; Sean Talbert; Cole Jones; Augustus Cook	United States	1:23.10
4	Camilo Valdés; Marcelo Godoy; Matías Nuñez; Miguel Valencia	Chile	1:24.32
5	Erick Cabrera; Sebastián Delgado; Luis Melo; Matías Otero	Uruguay	1:24.70
6	Juan Rodríguez; Alberto Briones; José Roberto Eguia; Carlos Navarro	Mexico	1:27.50
7	Yan López; Caleb Fábregat; Reyler Patterson; Robert Benítez	Cuba	1:27.80
