= Ihor Trunov =

Ukrainian canoeist (born 1992)

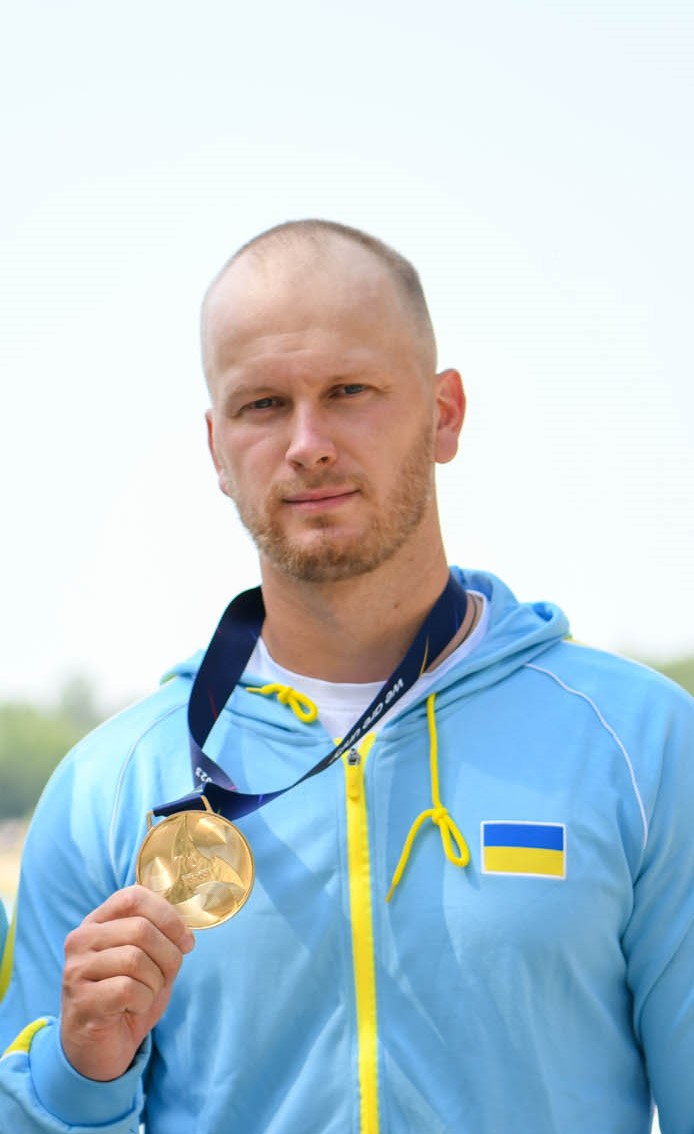
- Trunov at the 2023 European Games

Personal information
- Native name: Ігор Сергійович Трунов
- Full name: Ihor Serhiiovych Trunov
- Nationality: Ukrainian
- Born: 10 May 1992 (age 34) Dniprodzerzhynsk, Ukraine
- Height: 198 cm (6 ft 6 in)
- Weight: 103 kg (227 lb)

Sport
- Country: Ukraine
- Sport: Sprint kayak
- Club: PSC "Khimik", Pivdenne
- Coached by: Hryhoriy Kolomiets
Medal record
Representing Ukraine
World Championships
Gold medal – first place	2021 Copenhagen	K-4 500 m
Bronze medal – third place	2022 Dartmouth	K-4 500 m
Bronze medal – third place	2023 Duisburg	K-4 500 m
European Games
Gold medal – first place	2023 Kraków-Małopolska	K-2 500 m
Silver medal – second place	2023 Kraków-Małopolska	K-4 500 m
European Championships
Disqualified	2017 Plovdiv	K-2 500 m
Summer Universiade
Silver medal – second place	2013 Kazan	K-4 200 m

Ihor Serhiiovych Trunov (Ukrainian: Ігор Сергійович Трунов; born 10 May 1992) is a Ukrainian sprint canoeist. He is 2021 World Champion and bronze medallist of the 2022 World Championships.

== Sporting career ==
At the 2013 Summer Universiade he won silver in K-4 200 m. He is European Championships medalist.

At the 2017 European championships in Plovdiv, Bulgaria, he finished third in pair with Ivan Semykin in K-2 500 m. But in November 2017, Trunov received a four-year suspension following a positive drug in-competition test taken in May 2017. He was therefore stripped of the silver medal he won at the 2017 European championships. He returned to competitions after his ban ended and became 2021 World champion in the K–4 500 m event (together with Oleh Kukharyk, Dmytro Danylenko, and Ivan Semykin).
