= Jan Vorel (canoeist) =

Sadiq

Personal information
- Nationality: Czech
- Born: 2000 (age 25–26)

Sport
- Country: Czech Republic
- Sport: Sprint kayak
Medal record
World Championships
Bronze medal – third place	2021 Copenhagen	K-4 500 m

Jan Vorel (born 2000) is a Czech sprint canoeist.

He competed at the 2021 ICF Canoe Sprint World Championships, winning a bronze medal in the K-1 500 m distance.
