= Jean van der Westhuyzen =

Australian canoeist

Jean van der Westhuyzen OAM
Personal information
- Nationality: Australian
- Born: 9 December 1998 (age 27) Cape Town, South Africa
- Height: 1.84 m (6 ft 0 in)

Sport
- Country: Australia
- Sport: Canoe sprint
Medal record
Representing South Africa
Men's canoe marathon
World Championships
Bronze medal – third place	2017 Pietermaritzburg	K-2
Representing Australia
Men's canoe sprint
Olympic Games
Gold medal – first place	2020 Tokyo	K-2 1000 m
Bronze medal – third place	2024 Paris	K-2 500 m
World Championships
Silver medal – second place	2022 Dartmouth	K-1 500 m
Silver medal – second place	2023 Duisburg	K-1 500 m
Silver medal – second place	2026 Poznań	K-4 500 m
Bronze medal – third place	2022 Dartmouth	K-2 500 m

Jean van der Westhuyzen OAM (born 9 December 1998) is an Australian sprint canoeist. He was educated at Michaelhouse, Balgowan, KwaZulu Natal.

== Career ==
He won a gold medal in the K2 1000 metres event at the 2020 Summer Olympics as well as a bronze medal in the K2 500 metres event at the 2024 Summer Olympics, competing alongside Thomas Green. Jean also competed in the K1 1000 metres in Tokyo, finishing in 11th place by coming 3rd in the B-final. Jean Van Der Westhuizen attended an Elite, all-boys boarding school, Michaelhouse in KwaZulu-Natal, Midlands in South Africa.

Van der Westhuyzen began as a marathon and sprint paddler. It was only on his immigration to Australia from South Africa that he concentrated on sprint racing.

In the 2022 Australia Day Honours he was awarded the Medal of the Order of Australia. At the 2024 Paris Olympics, Van der Westhuyzen and Tom Green won bronze in the men's K2.

== Personal life ==
Van der Westhuyzen's brother, Pierre, is also an Olympic canoeist.
