= Jackson Collins =

Australian canoeist (born 1998)

Personal information
- Nationality: Australian
- Born: 5 November 1998 (age 27) South Brisbane, Queensland, Australia
- Home town: Gold Coast, Queensland, Australia

Sport
- Country: Australia
- Sport: Sprint kayak
- Event: K-4 500 m
- Club: Kurrawa Surf Club
Medal record
Men's canoe sprint
Representing Australia
Olympic Games
Silver medal – second place	2024 Paris	K-4 500 m
World Championships
Gold medal – first place	2022 Dartmouth	Mixed K-2 500 m
Silver medal – second place	2023 Duisburg	Mixed K-2 500 m

Jackson Collins (born 5 November 1998) is an Australian canoeist. He represented Australia at the 2024 Summer Olympics.

== Career ==
He competed at the 2023 ICF Canoe Sprint World Championships in the K-4 500 metres event and finished in fourth place with a time of 1:19.905. As a result, they qualified for the 2024 Summer Olympics. At the Olympics he competed in the K-4 500 metres event and won a silver medal. Following a photo finish, they missed winning the gold medal by 0.04 seconds.

== Personal life ==
Collins is the son of former Olympic canoeist Daniel Collins.
