= Ilya Fedarenka =

Belarusian canoeist

Personal information
- Nationality: Belarusian
- Born: 3 August 1998 (age 26)

Sport
- Sport: Canoe sprint

Ilya Fedarenka (Belarusian: Ілья Федарэнка; born 3 August 1998) is a Belarusian canoeist. He competed in the men's K-4 500 metres event at the 2020 Summer Olympics.
