= Ivan Semykin =

Ukrainian canoeist (born 1997)

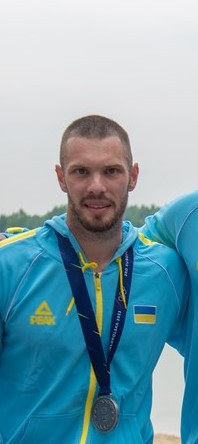
- Semykin at the 2023 European Games

Personal information
- Native name: Іван Семикін
- Nationality: Ukrainian
- Born: 4 June 1997 (age 29) Obukhiv, Ukraine
- Height: 183 cm (6 ft 0 in)
- Weight: 85 kg (187 lb)

Sport
- Country: Ukraine
- Sport: Sprint kayak
Medal record
Representing Ukraine
World Championships
Gold medal – first place	2021 Copenhagen	K-4 500 m
Bronze medal – third place	2022 Dartmouth	K-4 500 m
Bronze medal – third place	2023 Duisburg	K-4 500 m
European Games
Silver medal – second place	2023 Kraków	K-4 500 m
European Championships
Disqualified	2017 Plovdiv	K-2 500 m

Ivan Semykin (Ukrainian: Іван Семикін; born 4 June 1997) is a Ukrainian sprint canoeist. He is World champion in the K-4 500 m event. At the 2017 European championships in Plovdiv, Bulgaria, he finished third in pair with Ihor Trunov in K-2 500 m. Later he was stripped of that medal because of failed drug test by Trunov.
