= Noah Havard =

Australian canoeist (born 2000)

Personal information
- Born: 11 October 2000 (age 25) Randwick, New South Wales, Australia
- Home town: Gold Coast, Queensland, Australia

Sport
- Country: Australia
- Sport: Sprint kayak
- Event: K-4 500 m
- Club: North Bondi SLSC
Medal record
Men's canoe sprint
Representing Australia
Olympic Games
Silver medal – second place	2024 Paris	K-4 500 m
World Championships
Silver medal – second place	2026 Poznań	K-4 500 m

Noah Havard (born 11 October 2000) is an Australian canoeist. He represented Australia at the 2024 Summer Olympics.

== Career ==
He competed at the 2023 ICF Canoe Sprint World Championships in the K-4 500 metres event and finished in fourth place with a time of 1:19.905. As a result, they qualified for the 2024 Summer Olympics. At the Olympics he competed in the K-4 500 metres event and won a silver medal. Following a photo finish, they missed winning the gold medal by 0.04 seconds.
