= Samuel Baláž =

Slovak sprint canoeist (born 1998)

Personal information
- Nationality: Slovak
- Born: 25 August 1998 (age 28) Bratislava, Slovakia
- Height: 1.93 m (6 ft 4 in)
- Weight: 85 kg (187 lb)

Sport
- Country: Slovakia
- Sport: Sprint kayak
- Club: Police Sports Center
Medal record
Men's sprint kayak
Representing Slovakia
Olympic Games
Bronze medal – third place	2020 Tokyo	K-4 500 m
World Championships
Silver medal – second place	2018 Montemor-o-Velho	K-4 1000 m
Silver medal – second place	2021 Copenhagen	K-4 500 m
Bronze medal – third place	2019 Szeged	K-4 500 m
Bronze medal – third place	2021 Copenhagen	K-2 500 m
European Championships
Silver medal – second place	2018 Belgrade	K-4 1000 m
Silver medal – second place	2021 Poznań	K-2 1000 m
Silver medal – second place	2021 Poznań	K-4 500 m
Silver medal – second place	2022 Munich	K-4 500 m
Bronze medal – third place	2026 Montemor-o-Velho	K-1 5000 m
European Games
Bronze medal – third place	2019 Minsk	K-4 500 m

Samuel Baláž (born 25 August 1998) is a Slovak sprint canoeist who competed at the 2020 Summer Olympics.

== Career ==
He participated at the 2018 ICF Canoe Sprint World Championships.

== Major results ==
=== Olympics ===
Year	K-2 1000	K-4 500
2020	2 FB	3rd place, bronze medalist(s)

=== World championships ===
Year	K-1 500	K-1 5000	K-2 500	K-2 1000	K-4 500	K-4 1000
2018					7	2nd place, silver medalist(s)
2019					3rd place, bronze medalist(s)	
2021			3rd place, bronze medalist(s)		2nd place, silver medalist(s)	—N/a
2022				5	4	—N/a
2023					3 FB	—N/a
2024	7	DNF	—N/a		—N/a	—N/a
2025	6	14		—N/a		—N/a
2026	7		2 FB	—N/a		—N/a
