= Carlos Arévalo =

Spanish canoeist (born 1993)

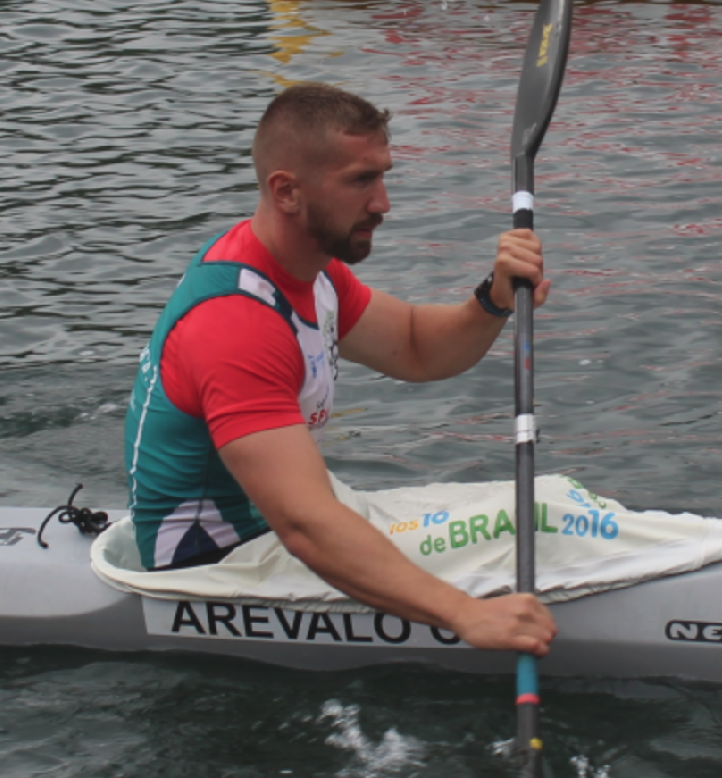
- Arévalo in 2018

Personal information
- Full name: Carlos Arévalo López
- Born: 6 December 1993 (age 32) Betanzos, Spain
- Height: 1.90 m (6 ft 3 in)
- Weight: 89 kg (196 lb)

Sport
- Country: Spain
- Sport: Sprint kayak
- Event: K-4 500 m
- Club: Club Nautico Ria de Betanzos
Medal record
Men's canoe sprint
Representing Spain
Olympic Games
Silver medal – second place	2020 Tokyo	K-4 500 m
Bronze medal – third place	2024 Paris	K-4 500 m
World Championships
Gold medal – first place	2022 Dartmouth	K-1 200 m
Gold medal – first place	2022 Dartmouth	K-4 500 m
Silver medal – second place	2019 Szeged	K-4 500 m
Bronze medal – third place	2025 Milan	K-4 500 m
Bronze medal – third place	2026 Poznań	K-1 200 m
European Championships
Gold medal – first place	2026 Montemor-o-Velho	K-1 200 m
Silver medal – second place	2026 Montemor-o-Velho	K-4 500 m
Bronze medal – third place	2025 Racice	K-1 200 m
European Games
Gold medal – first place	2023 Kraków-Małopolska	K-4 500 m

Carlos Arévalo López (born 6 December 1993) is a Spanish sprint canoeist.

== Career ==
He won the silver medal in the Men's K-4 500 metres event at the 2020 Summer Olympics in Tokyo with Saúl Craviotto, Marcus Walz and Rodrigo Germade. He won a medal at the 2019 ICF Canoe Sprint World Championships.
