= Rodrigo Germade =

Spanish canoeist

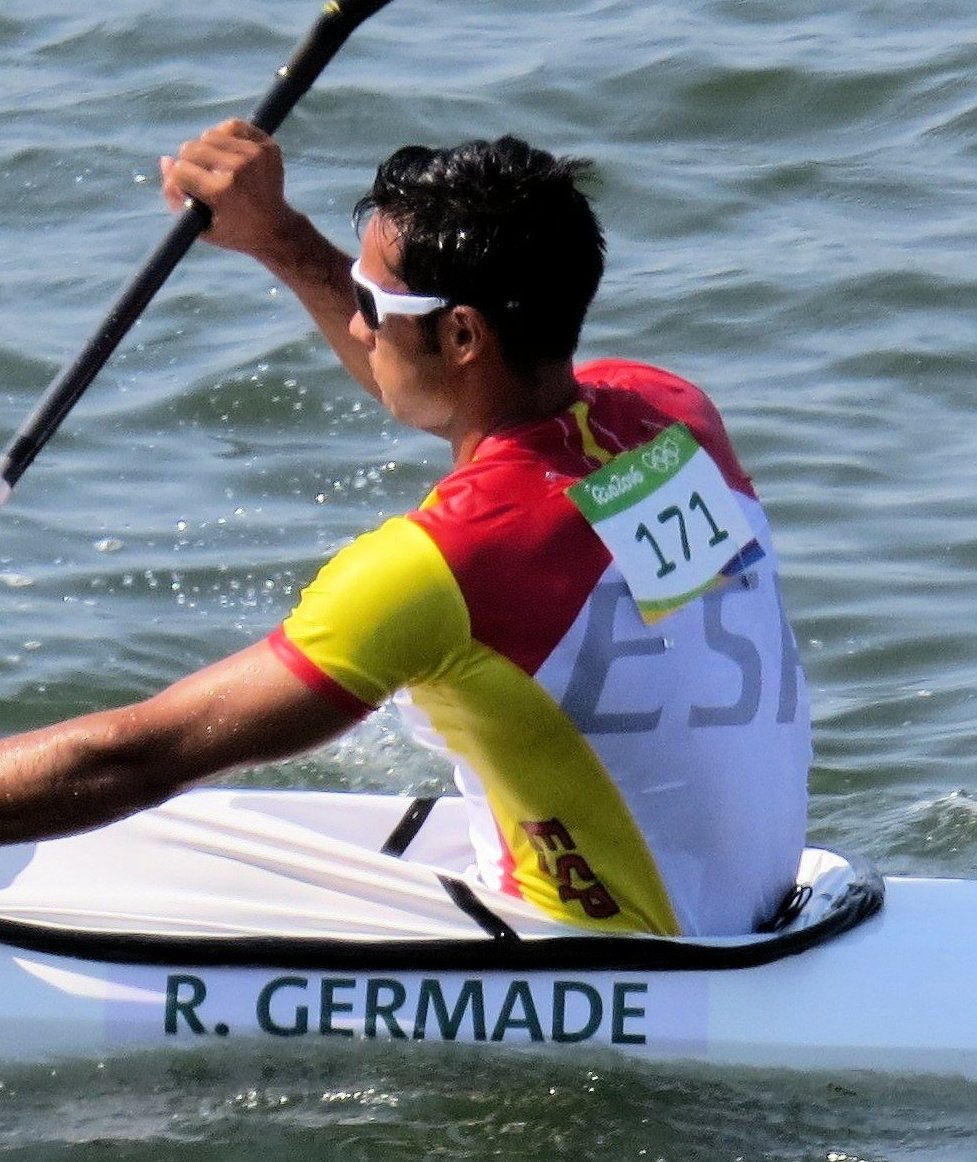
- Germade in 2016

Personal information
- Full name: Rodrigo Germade Barreiro
- Nationality: Spanish
- Born: 23 August 1990 (age 36) Cangas do Morrazo, Spain
- Height: 1.83 m (6 ft 0 in)
- Weight: 85 kg (187 lb)

Sport
- Country: Spain
- Sport: Sprint kayak
Medal record
Men's sprint kayak
Representing Spain
Olympic Games
Silver medal – second place	2020 Tokyo	K-4 500 m
Bronze medal – third place	2024 Paris	K-4 500 m
World Championships
Gold medal – first place	2017 Račice	K-2 500 m
Gold medal – first place	2021 Copenhagen	K-2 500 m
Gold medal – first place	2022 Dartmouth	K-4 500 m
Silver medal – second place	2017 Račice	K-4 500 m
Silver medal – second place	2018 Montemor-o-Velho	K-4 500 m
Silver medal – second place	2019 Szeged	K-4 500 m
Bronze medal – third place	2023 Duisburg	K-2 500 m
Bronze medal – third place	2025 Milan	K-4 500 m
European Championships
Gold medal – first place	2018 Belgrade	K-4 500 m
Silver medal – second place	2018 Belgrade	K-2 500 m
Silver medal – second place	2026 Montemor-o-Velho	K-4 500 m
Bronze medal – third place	2015 Račice	K-4 1000 m
European Games
Gold medal – first place	2023 Kraków-Małopolska	K-4 500 m
Mediterranean Games
Gold medal – first place	2018 Taragona	K-2 500 m

Rodrigo Germade Barreiro (born 23 August 1990) is a Spanish sprint canoeist.

== Career ==
He won the silver medal in the men's K-4 500 metres event at the 2020 Summer Olympics in Tokyo with Saúl Craviotto, Carlos Arévalo and Marcus Walz. Previously, he competed at the 2016 Summer Olympics in Rio de Janeiro, in the men's K-4 1000 metres.
