= István Kuli =

Hungarian sprint canoeist

Personal information
- Nationality: Hungarian
- Born: 22 June 1998 (age 28)

Sport
- Country: Hungary
- Sport: Canoe sprint
- Event: Kayaking
- Club: Az NKM Szeged
Medal record
World Championships
Silver medal – second place	2023 Duisburg	K-4 500 m
Bronze medal – third place	2018 Montemor-o-Velho	K-4 500 m

István Kuli (born 22 June 1998) is a Hungarian sprint canoeist.

He participated at the 2018 ICF Canoe Sprint World Championships.
