= Dmytro Danylenko =

Ukrainian canoeist (born 1999)

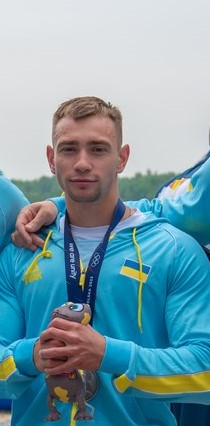
- Danylenko at the 2023 European Games

Personal information
- Nationality: Ukrainian
- Born: 24 June 1999 (age 27) Vinnytsia, Ukraine
- Height: 177 cm (5 ft 10 in)
- Weight: 80 kg (176 lb)

Sport
- Country: Ukraine
- Sport: Sprint kayak
Medal record
Men's sprint kayak
Representing Ukraine
World Championships
Gold medal – first place	2021 Copenhagen	K-4 500 m
Bronze medal – third place	2022 Dartmouth	K-4 500 m
Bronze medal – third place	2023 Duisburg	K-4 500 m
European Games
Silver medal – second place	2023 Kraków	K-4 500 m
European Championships
Silver medal – second place	2021 Poznań	K-2 500 m

Dmytro Danylenko (Ukrainian: Дмитро Даниленко; born 24 June 1999) is a Ukrainian sprint canoer. He is 2021 World Champion and bronze medallist of the 2022 World Championships. He is also a silver medalists of the 2021 European Championships in pair with Oleh Kukharyk.
