= Andrejus Olijnikas =

Lithuanian canoeist (born 1987)

Personal information
- Nationality: Lithuanian
- Born: 16 October 1987 (age 38)
- Height: 1.85 m (6 ft 1 in)
- Weight: 86 kg (190 lb)

Sport
- Country: Lithuania
- Sport: Canoe sprint
- Event: Kayaking
- Club: Kaunas Rowing School
Medal record
Men's canoeing
Representing Lithuania
World Championships
Silver medal – second place	2011 Szeged	K-2 500 m
Silver medal – second place	2022 Dartmouth	K-2 500 m
Bronze medal – third place	2018 Montemor-o-Velho	K-2 500 m
European Championships
Bronze medal – third place	2021 Poznań	K-2 1000 m
Bronze medal – third place	2022 Munich	K-2 500 m
Bronze medal – third place	2024 Szeged	K-2 500 m

Andrejus Olijnikas (born 16 October 1987) is a Lithuanian canoeist.

In 2015 he and Ričardas Nekriošius finished at 7th place in World Championships and qualified for the 2016 Summer Olympics.

At the 2022 ICF Canoe Sprint World Championships Olijnikas together with Mindaugas Maldonis won silver medal in K-2 500 m event.
