= Marcus Cooper (canoeist) =

Spanish canoeist (born 1994)

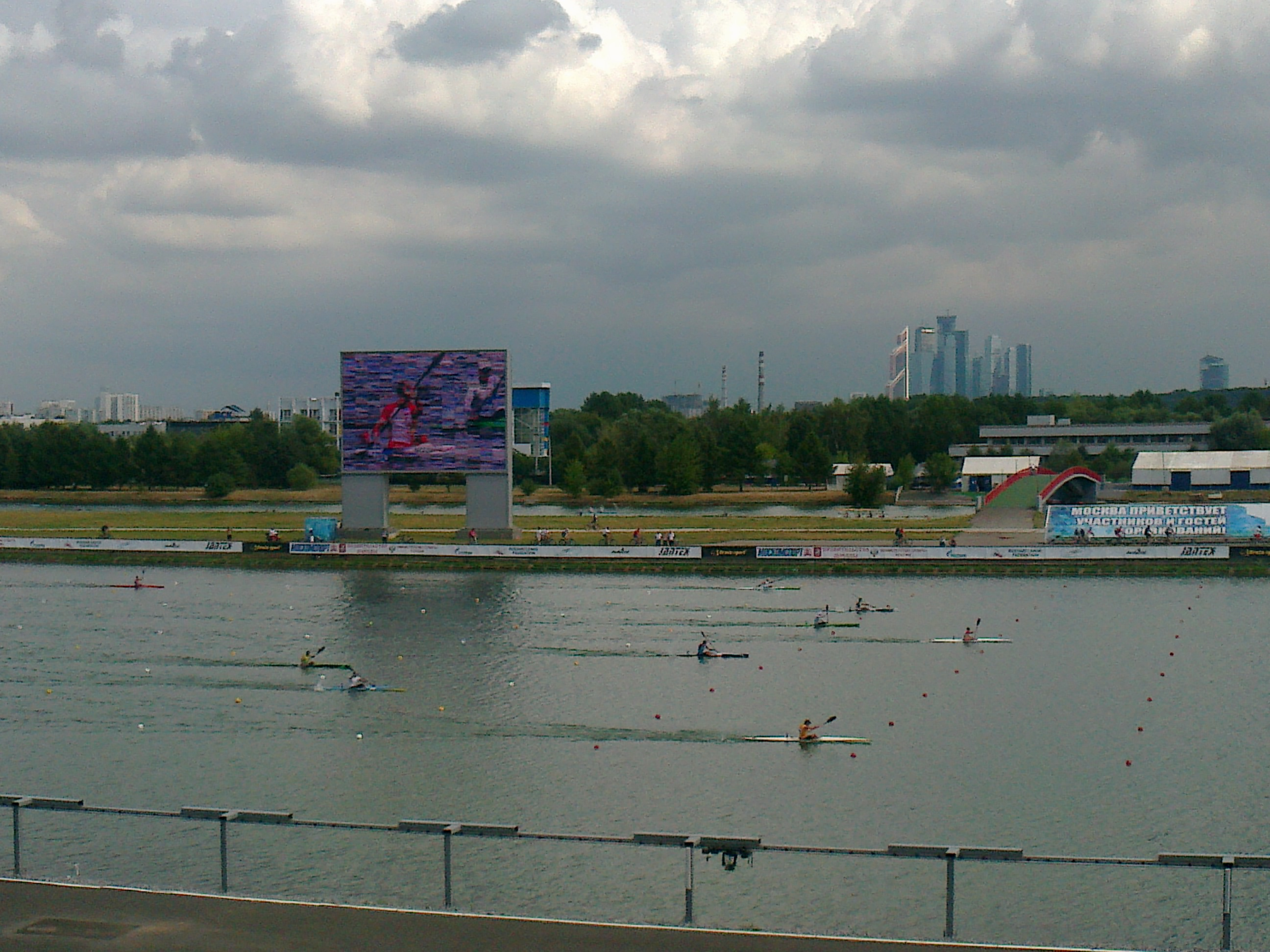
- Cooper (lane 5) in 2014

Personal information
- Full name: Marcus Cooper Walz
- Nationality: British (former); Spanish (current)
- Born: 3 October 1994 (age 31) Oxford, England
- Height: 1.86 m (6 ft 1 in)
- Weight: 85 kg (187 lb)

Sport
- Country: Spain
- Sport: Sprint kayak
- Club: Reial Club Nàutic Portopetro
Medal record
Men's sprint kayak
Representing Spain
Olympic Games
Gold medal – first place	2016 Rio de Janeiro	K-1 1000 m
Silver medal – second place	2020 Tokyo	K-4 500 m
Bronze medal – third place	2024 Paris	K-4 500 m
World Championships
Gold medal – first place	2017 Račice	K-2 500 m
Gold medal – first place	2021 Copenhagen	K-2 500 m
Gold medal – first place	2022 Dartmouth	K-4 500 m
Silver medal – second place	2015 Milan	K-2 500 m
Silver medal – second place	2017 Račice	K-4 500 m
Silver medal – second place	2018 Montemor-o-Velho	K-4 500 m
Silver medal – second place	2019 Szeged	K-4 500 m
Bronze medal – third place	2014 Moscow	K-1 500 m
European Championships
Gold medal – first place	2017 Plovdiv	K-4 1000 m
Gold medal – first place	2018 Belgrade	K-4 500 m
Silver medal – second place	2018 Belgrade	K-2 500 m
Silver medal – second place	2026 Montemor-o-Velho	K-4 500 m
European Games
Gold medal – first place	2023 Kraków-Małopolska	K-4 500 m
Mediterranean Games
Gold medal – first place	2018 Tarragona	K-2 500 m

Marcus Cooper Walz (born 3 October 1994) is a sprint canoeist. Born in England, he has competed internationally for Spain since the early 2010s. He won the gold medal in the K-1 1000 metres event at the 2016 Summer Olympics in Rio de Janeiro. He won the silver medal in the Men's K-4 500 metres event at the 2020 Summer Olympics in Tokyo with Saúl Craviotto, Carlos Arévalo and Rodrigo Germade.

Born in Oxford to English parents, the family established in Mallorca when Cooper was 3 months old. Walz became a Spanish national in 2015. On 26 June 2024, the Spanish Olympic Committee selected Cooper, together with the Olympic boat driver Támara Echegoyen, as the flag bearers for París 2024.

Cooper competed as Marcus Walz until 2022.

== Major results ==
=== Olympics ===
Year	K-1 1000	K-2 500	K-4 500
2016	1st place, gold medalist(s)	—N/a	—N/a
2020		—N/a	2nd place, silver medalist(s)
2024		4	3rd place, bronze medalist(s)

=== World championships ===
Year	K-1 500	K-2 500	K-4 500
2014	3rd place, bronze medalist(s)		—N/a
2015		2nd place, silver medalist(s)	—N/a
2017		1st place, gold medalist(s)	2nd place, silver medalist(s)
2018			2nd place, silver medalist(s)
2019			2nd place, silver medalist(s)
2021		1st place, gold medalist(s)	
2022	9		1st place, gold medalist(s)
2023			7

Olympic Games
Preceded by Saúl Craviotto; Mireia Belmonte	Flagbearer for Spain; París 2024; With: Támara Echegoyen	Succeeded by Incumbent
