= Saúl Craviotto =

Spanish sprinter kayaker

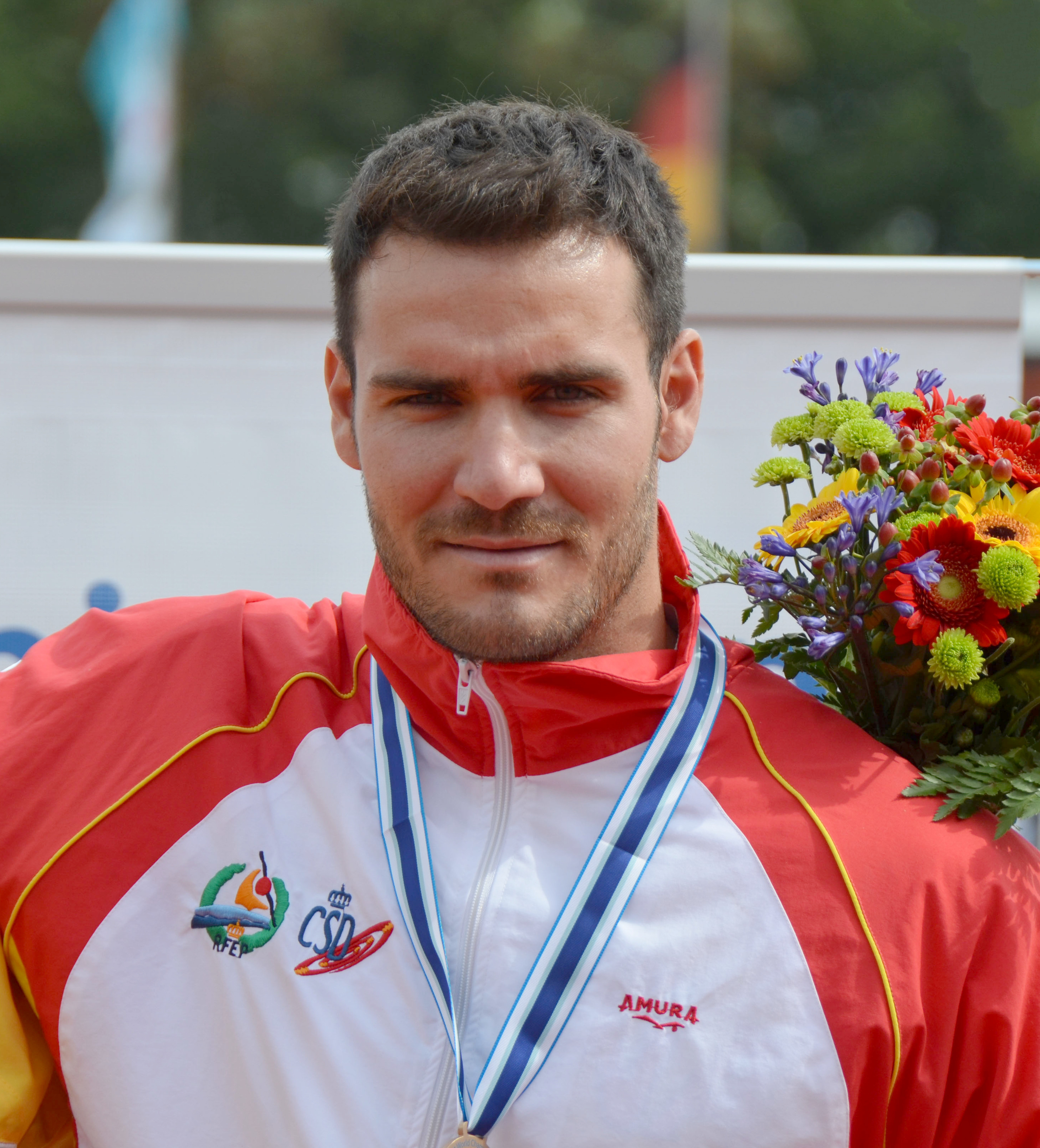
- Craviotto at the 2013 World Championships

Personal information
- Nationality: Spanish
- Born: Saúl Craviotto Rivero; 3 November 1984 (age 41) Lleida, Catalonia, Spain
- Education: Catholic University of Murcia
- Height: 192 cm (6 ft 4 in)
- Weight: 98 kg (216 lb)

Sport
- Country: Spain
- Sport: Sprint kayak
- Events: K-1 200 m, K-2 200 m, K-2 500 m, K-4 500 m
- Club: Club Deportivo Basico Piragua Madrid
- Coached by: Miguel Garcia
Medal record
Men's canoe sprint
Representing Spain
Olympic Games
Gold medal – first place	2008 Beijing	K-2 500 m
Gold medal – first place	2016 Rio de Janeiro	K-2 200 m
Silver medal – second place	2012 London	K-1 200 m
Silver medal – second place	2020 Tokyo	K-4 500 m
Bronze medal – third place	2016 Rio de Janeiro	K-1 200 m
Bronze medal – third place	2024 Paris	K-4 500 m
World Championships
Gold medal – first place	2009 Dartmouth	K-1 4×200 m
Gold medal – first place	2010 Poznań	K-1 4×200 m
Gold medal – first place	2011 Szeged	K-1 4×200 m
Gold medal – first place	2022 Dartmouth	K-4 500 m
Silver medal – second place	2009 Dartmouth	K-2 200 m
Silver medal – second place	2010 Poznań	K-2 200 m
Silver medal – second place	2018 Montemor-o-Velho	K-2 200 m
Silver medal – second place	2018 Montemor-o-Velho	K-4 500 m
Silver medal – second place	2019 Szeged	K-4 500 m
Bronze medal – third place	2013 Duisburg	K-1 200 m
Bronze medal – third place	2014 Moscow	K-1 200 m
European Games
Gold medal – first place	2023 Kraków-Małopolska	K-4 500 m
European Championships
Gold medal – first place	2009 Brandenburg	K-2 200 m
Gold medal – first place	2018 Belgrade	K-2 200 m
Gold medal – first place	2018 Belgrade	K-4 500 m
Silver medal – second place	2008 Milan	K-2 500 m
Silver medal – second place	2010 Trasona	K-2 200 m
Silver medal – second place	2010 Trasona	K-2 500 m
Mediterranean Games
Gold medal – first place	2009 Pescara	K-2 500 m
Gold medal – first place	2013 Mersin	K-2 200 m
Bronze medal – third place	2013 Mersin	K-1 200 m

Saúl Craviotto Rivero (born 3 November 1984) is a Spanish police officer and sprint kayaker who has been racing since the mid-2000s. He has won six Olympic medals: a gold medal (with Carlos Pérez) in the K-2 500 m event at the 2008 Summer Olympics in Beijing, a silver medal in the K-1 200 m event at the 2012 Summer Olympics in London, a gold medal (with Cristian Toro) in the K-2 200 m event and a bronze medal in the K-1 200 m at the 2016 Summer Olympics in Rio de Janeiro, a silver medal (with Marcus Cooper, Carlos Arévalo and Rodrigo Germade) in the K-4 500 m event at the 2020 Summer Olympics in Tokyo, and a bronze medal (with Carlos Arévalo, Marcus Cooper, and Rodrigo Germade) in the K-4 500 m event at the 2024 Summer Olympics. He served as the flag bearer for Spain at the closing ceremony of the 2012 Olympics and at the opening ceremony of the 2020 Olympics.

Craviotto also won seven medals at the ICF Canoe Sprint World Championships with three golds (K-1 4 × 200 m: 2009, 2010, 2011), two silvers (K-2 200 m: 2009, 2010) and two bronzes (K-1 200m: 2013, 2014).

== Career ==
Craviotto took up kayaking at the age of seven, following his father, and competed together with him in K-2 events. He is married to Celia García and has a daughter Valentina. He proposed to his wife at the 2012 Olympics, at Piccadilly Circus, the day after winning an Olympic silver medal. He works as a police officer in Gijón.

In 2017, Craviotto participated in the reality television cooking show MasterChef Celebrity and won.

In 2021, Craviotto became Hockerty's first brand's ambassador and model.

== TV career ==
Television
Year	Title	Channel	Role	Ref.
2016	Be The Best	Be Mad TV	Guest	
2017	MasterChef Celebrity	La 1	Contestant (Winner)	
2017	Ultimate Beastmaster	Netflix	Host	

Olympic Games
Preceded by Rafael Nadal	Flagbearer for Spain (with Mireia Belmonte); Tokyo 2020	Succeeded by Incumbent
