= Vid Debeljak =

Slovenian canoeist

Personal information
- Nationality: Slovenian
- Born: 17 November 1994 (age 31) Ljubljana, Slovenia

Sport
- Sport: Canoeing
- Event: Wildwater canoeing
- Club: KKK Tacen
Medal record
Event	1st	2nd	3rd
World Championships	3	2	1
European Championships	2	0	0
Total	5	2	1

Vid Debeljak (born 17 November 1994) is a Slovenian male canoeist who won eight medals at individual senior level at the Wildwater Canoeing World Championships and European Wildwater Championships.
