= Radek Šlouf =

Czech canoeist

Personal information
- Nationality: Czech
- Born: 30 October 1994 (age 31)
- Height: 1.84 m (6 ft 0 in)

Sport
- Country: Czech Republic
- Sport: Canoe sprint, Sprint kayak
Medal record
Men's sprint kayak
Representing Czech Republic
Olympic Games
Bronze medal – third place	2020 Tokyo	K-2 1000 m
World Championships
Bronze medal – third place	2017 Račice	K-4 500 m
Bronze medal – third place	2021 Copenhagen	K-4 500 m
European Championships
Silver medal – second place	2025 Racice	K-4 500 m

Radek Šlouf (Czech pronunciation: [ˈradɛk ˈʃlouf]; born 30 October 1994) is a Czech sprint canoeist. He competed in the men's K-2 1000 metres event at the 2020 Summer Olympics and won a bronze medal.
