= Vladimir Torubarov =

Serbian canoeist

Personal information
- Nationality: Serbian
- Born: 22 March 1993 (age 33) Novi Sad, Yugoslavia
- Height: 1.91 m (6 ft 3 in)
- Weight: 94 kg (207 lb)

Sport
- Country: Serbia
- Sport: Canoe sprint
- Event: Kayaking
- Club: Vojvodina Novi Sad
Medal record
Men's canoe sprint
Representing Serbia
World Championships
Silver medal – second place	2018 Montemor-o-Velho	K-2 500 m
Bronze medal – third place	2014 Moscow	K-2 1000 m
European Games
Bronze medal – third place	2023 Kraków-Małopolska	K-4 500 m
Mediterranean Games
Bronze medal – third place	2018 Tarragona	K-2 500 m
World U23 Championships
Silver medal – second place	2014 Szeged	K-2 1000 m
European U23 Championships
Silver medal – second place	2016 Plovdiv	K-2 1000 m
Silver medal – second place	2012 Montemor-o-Velho	K-2 500 m
Silver medal – second place	2012 Montemor-o-Velho	K-2 1000 m

Vladimir Torubarov (Serbian Cyrillic: Владимир Торубаров 22 March 1993) is a Serbian sprint canoer.

He won a bronze medal in the K-2 1000 m event at the 2014 World Championship in Moscow.
