= Jakub Stepun =

Polish sprint canoeist medalist (born 2001)

Personal information
- Born: August 30, 2001 (age 25) Trzcianka, Poland

Sport
- Country: Poland
- Sport: Canoe sprint
- Club: AZS AWF Poznań
Medal record
Men's canoe sprint
Representing Poland
World Championships
Silver medal – second place	2024 Samarkand	K-1 200 m
European Championships
Silver medal – second place	2024 Szeged	K-1 200 m
Silver medal – second place	2024 Szeged	K-2 200 m
Silver medal – second place	2024 Szeged	K-4 500 m
Bronze medal – third place	2025 Racice	K-4 500 m

Jakub Stepun (born 30 August 2001 in Trzcianka) is a Polish sprint canoeist and European Championship medalist.

== Career ==
Stepun began his career at UKS Kajak Trzcianka before joining AS AWF Poznań.

He achieved success in youth categories, winning a gold medal in the K-1 200 meters event at the U23 World Championships in 2021. At the 2022 U23 World Championships, he won three gold medals in the K-2 500 meters (with Bartosz Grabowski), K-2 500 meters mixed (with Martyna Klatt), and K-4 500 meters (with Bartosz Grabowski, Przemysław Korsak, and Wiktor Leszczyński). At the U23 European Championships, he won a gold medal in the K-1 200 meters in 2021 and two gold medals in the K-1 200 meters and K-2 500 meters (with Bartosz Grabowski) in 2022.

In 2022, Stepun won a silver medal at the Senior European Championships in the K-2 200 meters event (with Bartosz Grabowski). His best result at the Senior World Championships is fourth place in the K-1 200 meters in 2021.

At the Polish Senior Championships, Stepun has won four gold medals:

- 2019: K-4 1000 m
- 2021: K-1 200 m
- 2022: K-2 200 m (mixed)
- 2023: K-2 200 m (mixed)

== Major results ==
=== Olympic Games ===
Year	K-2 500
2024	5 FB

=== World championships ===
Year	K-1 200	K-2 500	K-4 500	XK-4 500
2021	4			—N/a
2022		3 FB	8	—N/a
2023		1 FC	9	—N/a
2024	2nd place, silver medalist(s)	—N/a	—N/a	5
