= Csaba Zalka =

Slovak sprint canoeist

Personal information
- Nationality: Slovak
- Born: 11 March 1999 (age 27) Šamorín, Slovakia
- Height: 192 cm (6 ft 4 in)

Sport
- Country: Slovakia
- Sport: Sprint kayak
- Event: K-4 500 m
Medal record
Men's sprint kayak
Representing Slovakia
World Championships
Silver medal – second place	2021 Copenhagen	K-4 500 m
Bronze medal – third place	2019 Szeged	K-4 500 m
European Games
Bronze medal – third place	2019 Minsk	K-4 500 m
European Championships
Silver medal – second place	2021 Poznań	K-4 500 m
Silver medal – second place	2022 Munich	K-4 500 m

Csaba Zalka (born 11 March 1999) is a Slovak sprint canoeist.

He won a medal at the 2019 ICF Canoe Sprint World Championships.
