= Trevor Thomson =

British sprint canoeist

Personal information
- Nationality: British
- Born: 27 July 1998 (age 26); Vanderbijlpark, South Africa
- Height: 1.83 m (6 ft 0 in)
- Weight: 79 kg (174 lb)

Sport
- Country: Great Britain
- Sport: Canoe sprint

Trevor Thomson (born 27 July 1998) is a British sprint canoeist.

In 2016 he won medals at the World Junior and European Junior Championships in the K-2 200m discipline. He made his senior championship debut at the 2018 European Championships in the K-4 500m discipline.
