= Seiji Komatsu =

Japanese canoeist (born 1992)

Personal information
- Born: 29 January 1992 (age 34)
- Height: 176 cm (5 ft 9 in)
- Weight: 82 kg (181 lb)

Sport
- Sport: Canoe sprint
- Club: Ehime Prefecture National Sporting Performance Office
Medal record
Representing Japan
Asian Games
Bronze medal – third place	2014 Incheon	K1 200 m
Asian Championships
Silver medal – second place	2017 Shanghai	K1 200 m
Silver medal – second place	2017 Shanghai	K4 500 m

Seiji Komatsu (小松正治, Komatsu Seiji; born 29 January 1992) is a Japanese sprint canoeist. Competing in the individual 200 m event he won a silver medal at the 2017 Asian Championships and a bronze at the 2014 Asian Games.

Komatsu took up canoeing aged 13 in Miyagi Prefecture. Besides training himself, he coaches high school students, and works for the Ehime Prefecture National Sporting Performance. In 2017 he was banned from competitions for doping, but the ban was lifted next year when it was found that his rival Yasuhiro Suzuki intentionally added an anabolic steroid into Komatsu's drink.
