= Laurent Lavigne (canoeist) =

Canadian canoeist

Personal information
- Full name: Laurent Olivie Lavigne
- Born: May 16, 2001 (age 25) Trois-Rivières, Quebec, Canada

Sport
- Sport: Canoeing
Medal record
Men's canoe sprint
Representing Canada
Pan American Games
| Silver medal – second place | 2023 Santiago | K-4 500 metres |
ICF World Junior Championships
| Silver medal – second place | Pitesti 2019 | K-1 500 metres |

Laurent Olivie Lavigne (born May 16, 2001) is a Canadian sprint kayaker.

== Career ==
At the 2019 World Junior Championships in Pitești, Romania, Lavigne won silver in the K-1 500 metres event. This was the first medal at the World Junior Championships by a Canadian male in over 20 years.

Lavigne made his senior debut in 2021. At the 2023 Worlds, Lavigne finished in 10th in the K-4 500 metres, helping Canada qualify the boat for the 2024 Summer Olympics. In September 2023, Lavigne was named to Canada's 2023 Pan American Games team. At the games, Lavigne was part of the silver medal-winning K-4 500 metres team.

In June 2024, Lavigne was named to Canada's 2024 Olympic team.
