= Bence Nádas =

Hungarian sprint canoeist (born 1996)

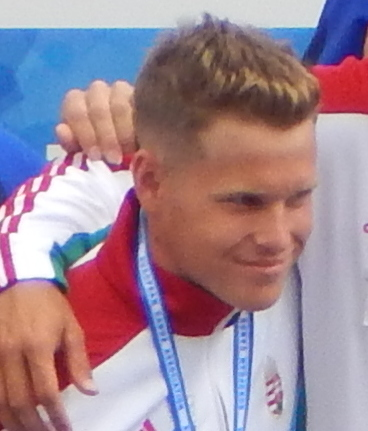
- Nádas in 2016

Personal information
- Nationality: Hungarian
- Born: 17 April 1996 (age 30) Budapest, Hungary
- Height: 1.80 m (5 ft 11 in)
- Weight: 79 kg (174 lb)

Sport
- Country: Hungary
- Sport: Canoe sprint
- Event: Kayaking
- Club: NKM Szeged VE
Medal record
Men's canoe sprint
Representing Hungary
Olympic Games
Silver medal – second place	2024 Paris	K-2 500 m
World Championships
Gold medal – first place	2014 Moscow	K-1 200 m relay
Gold medal – first place	2022 Dartmouth	K-2 500 m
Gold medal – first place	2025 Milan	K-2 500 m
Silver medal – second place	2017 Racice	K-2 500 m
Silver medal – second place	2023 Duisburg	K-2 500 m
Silver medal – second place	2023 Duisburg	K-4 500 m
Bronze medal – third place	2018 Montemor-o-Velho	K-1 500 m
European Championships
Gold medal – first place	2016 Moscow	K-4 500 m
Gold medal – first place	2017 Plovdiv	K-2 500 m
Gold medal – first place	2017 Plovdiv	K-4 500 m
Gold medal – first place	2022 Munich	K-2 500 m
Gold medal – first place	2024 Szeged	K-2 500 m
Gold medal – first place	2026 Montemor-o-Velho	K-4 500 m
Bronze medal – third place	2016 Moscow	K-1 500 m

Bence Nádas (born 17 April 1996) is a Hungarian sprint canoeist.

He participated at the 2018 ICF Canoe Sprint World Championships.
