= Ignas Navakauskas =

Lithuanian canoeist (born 1989)

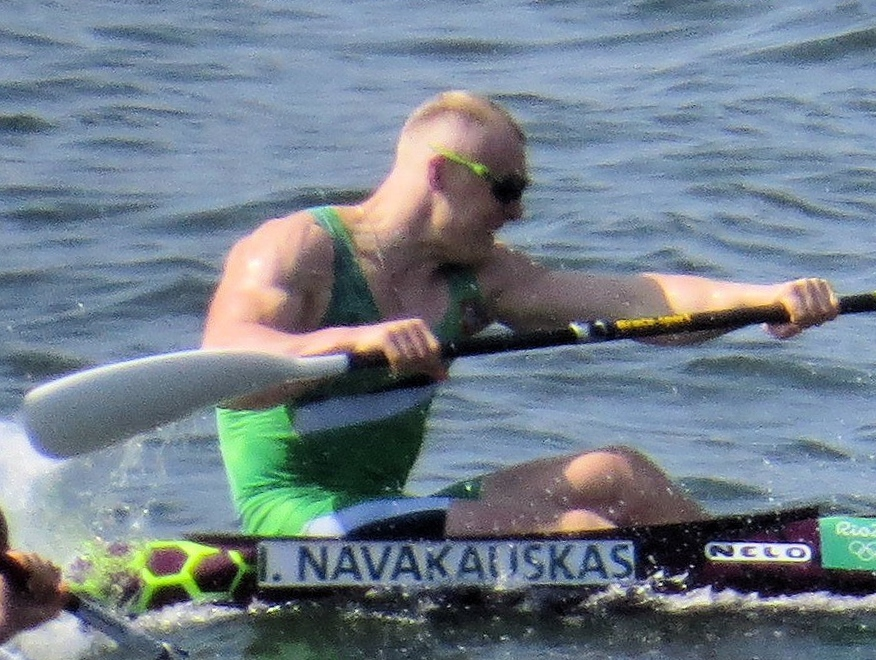
- Navakauskas at the 2016 Olympics

Personal information
- Born: 22 September 1989 (age 36)
- Height: 180 cm (5 ft 11 in)
- Weight: 90 kg (198 lb)

Sport
- Sport: Canoe sprint
- Coached by: Romas Petrukanecas
Medal record
Representing Lithuania
European championships
Silver medal – second place	2021 Poznań	K-2 200 m
Bronze medal – third place	2015 Račice	K-1 200 m
Bronze medal – third place	2016 Moscow	K-1 200 m
Bronze medal – third place	2022 Munich	K-2 200 m
Summer Universiade
Gold medal – first place	2013 Kazan	K-1 200 m

Ignas Navakauskas (born 22 September 1989) is a Lithuanian sprint canoeist. Competing in the individual K-1 200 m event he won bronze medals at the 2015 and 2016 European Championships. He placed ninth at the 2016 Olympics and fourth-fifth at the world championships in 2013–2015.
