= Guillaume Burger =

French sprint canoer

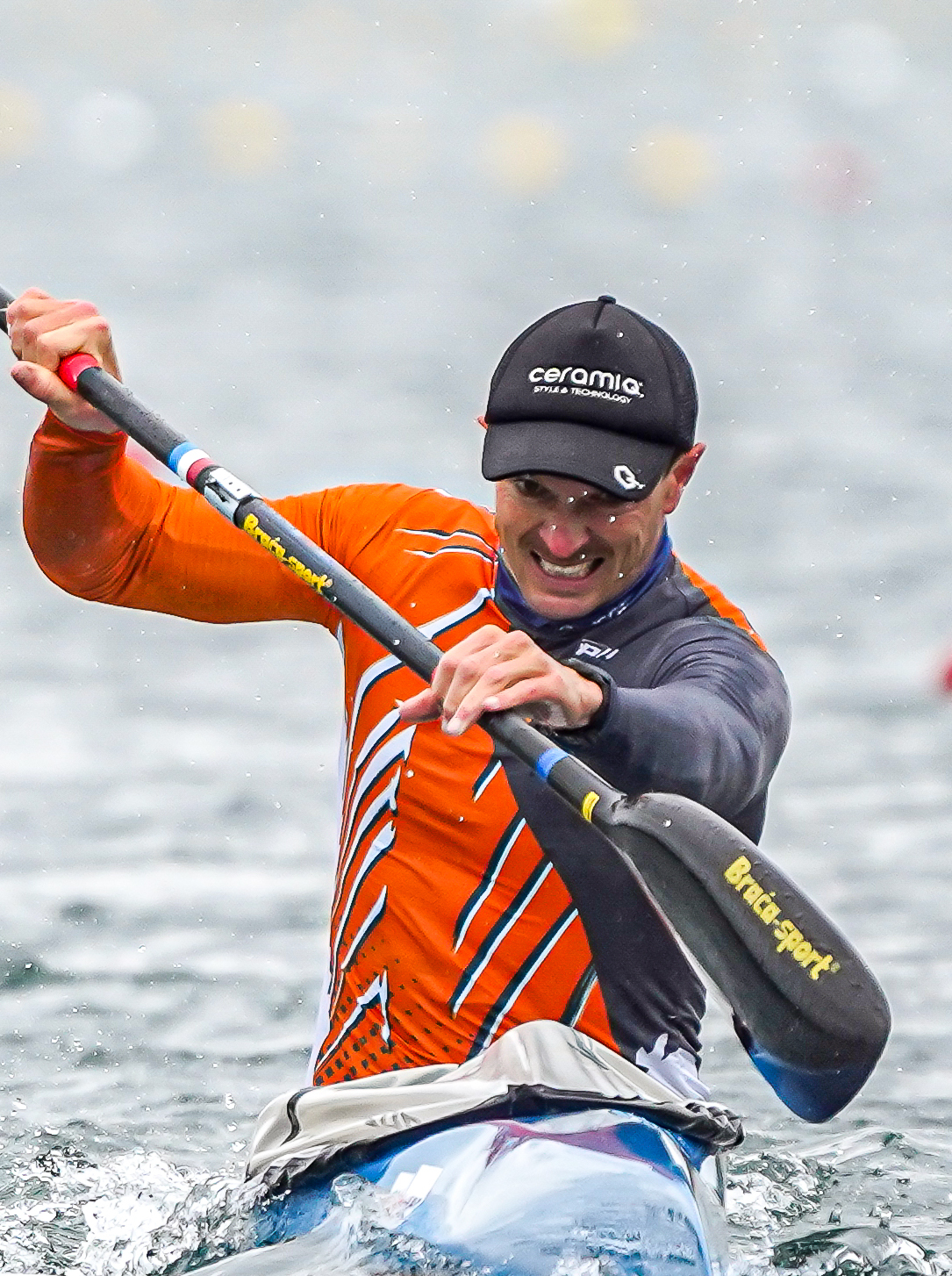
- Guillaume Burger

Personal information
- Born: 25 January 1989 (age 37) Schiltigheim, France
Medal record
Men's canoe sprint
World Championships
Silver medal – second place	2009 Dartmouth	K-4 1000 m
Bronze medal – third place	2009 Dartmouth	K-1 4 x 200 m
European Championships
Bronze medal – third place	2022 Munich	K-4 500 m
Mediterranean Games
Bronze medal – third place	2018 Taragona	K-1 500 m

Guillaume Burger (born 25 January 1989) is a French sprint canoeist who has competed since the late 2000s.

== Career ==
He won two medals at the 2009 ICF Canoe Sprint World Championships in Dartmouth with a silver in the K-4 1000 m and a bronze in the K-1 4 x 200 m events.

He is member of the CKCIR Saint Grégoire Club.
