= Bartosz Grabowski =

Polish sprint canoeist

Personal information
- Nationality: Polish
- Born: 11 April 2000 (age 26)

Sport
- Country: Poland
- Sport: Sprint kayak
Medal record
Men's sprint kayak
Representing Poland
World Championships
Silver medal – second place	2019 Szeged	K-2 200 m
Bronze medal – third place	2021 Copenhagen	K-2 Mix 200 m
European Championships
Silver medal – second place	2022 Munich	K-2 200 m

Bartosz Grabowski (born 11 April 2000) is a Polish sprint canoeist.

Grabowski was a world junior vice-champion in 2017 in the K-4 500m event (with P. Korsak, W. Tracz and F. Weckwert). He was European and world junior champion in 2018 in the K-1 200m category. He also won the bronze medal in the K-1 200m Under 23 event in the Piesti world championship, as well as a medal in the 2019 ICF Canoe Sprint World Championships.
