= 2022 ICF Canoe Sprint World Championships =

Canoeing competition

- Venue: Lake Banook
- Location: Dartmouth, Canada
- Dates: August 3–7

The 2022 ICF Canoe Sprint World Championships was held from August 3 to 7, 2022 in Dartmouth, Canada.

== Canoe sprint ==
=== Medal table ===
* Host nation (Canada)

| Rank | Nation | Gold | Silver | Bronze | Total |
|---|---|---|---|---|---|
| 1 | Spain | 4 | 2 | 2 | 8 |
| 2 | Hungary | 4 | 1 | 6 | 11 |
| 3 | Poland | 3 | 3 | 1 | 7 |
| 4 | Canada* | 3 | 1 | 2 | 6 |
| 5 | Germany | 2 | 7 | 5 | 14 |
| 6 | Australia | 2 | 2 | 1 | 5 |
| 7 | Ukraine | 2 | 1 | 2 | 5 |
| 8 | New Zealand | 2 | 0 | 0 | 2 |
| 9 | China | 1 | 2 | 2 | 5 |
| 10 | Brazil | 1 | 1 | 0 | 2 |
| 10 | Cuba | 1 | 1 | 0 | 2 |
| 10 | Romania | 1 | 1 | 0 | 2 |
| 10 | Sweden | 1 | 1 | 0 | 2 |
| 14 | Czech Republic | 1 | 0 | 2 | 3 |
| 15 | Moldova | 1 | 0 | 0 | 1 |
| 15 | United States | 1 | 0 | 0 | 1 |
| 17 | Portugal | 0 | 2 | 1 | 3 |
| 18 | Chile | 0 | 1 | 1 | 2 |
| 18 | Croatia | 0 | 1 | 1 | 2 |
| 20 | Italy | 0 | 1 | 0 | 1 |
| 20 | Lithuania | 0 | 1 | 0 | 1 |
| 20 | Slovenia | 0 | 1 | 0 | 1 |
| 23 | Belgium | 0 | 0 | 1 | 1 |
| 23 | Finland | 0 | 0 | 1 | 1 |
| 23 | Ireland | 0 | 0 | 1 | 1 |
| 23 | Kazakhstan | 0 | 0 | 1 | 1 |
| 23 | Mexico | 0 | 0 | 1 | 1 |
| Totals (27 entries) | | 30 | 30 | 31 | 91 |

=== Men ===
Non-Olympic classes

==== Canoe ====
| Event | Gold | | Silver | | Bronze | |
|---|---|---|---|---|---|---|
| C–1 200 m | Oleksii Koliadych; Poland | 39.25 | Nico Pickert; Germany | 39.35 | Viktor Stepanov; Kazakhstan | 39.44 |
| C–1 500 m | Isaquias Queiroz; Brazil | 1:54.49 | Cătălin Chirilă; Romania | 1:56.51 | Martin Fuksa; Czech Republic | 1:56.79 |
| C–1 1000 m | Cătălin Chirilă; Romania | 4:14.28 | Isaquias Queiroz; Brazil | 4:15.80 | Martin Fuksa; Czech Republic | 4:16.21 |
| C–1 5000 m | Serghei Tarnovschi; Moldova | 23:37.85 | Serguey Torres; Cuba | 23:37.94 | Sebastian Brendel; Germany | 23:55.18 |
| C–2 500 m | Spain; Cayetano García; Pablo Martínez | 1:46.32 | Poland; Wiktor Głazunow; Tomasz Barniak | 1:46.81 | China; Liu Hao; Ji Bowen | 1:46.90 |
| C–2 1000 m | Germany; Sebastian Brendel; Tim Hecker | 3:54.91 | China; Liu Hao; Ji Bowen | 3:55.34 | Canada; Craig Spence; Bret Himmelman | 4:06.14 |
| C–4 500 m | Spain; Joan Moreno; Pablo Graña; Manuel Fontán; Adrián Sieiro | 1:39.42 | Poland; Aleksander Kitewski; Arsen Śliwiński; Wiktor Głazunow; Norman Zezula | 1:39.91 | Ukraine; Vitaliy Vergeles; Andrii Rybachok; Yurii Vandiuk; Taras Mishchuk | 1:40.52 |

==== Kayak ====
| Event | Gold | | Silver | | Bronze | |
|---|---|---|---|---|---|---|
| K–1 200 m | Carlos Arévalo; Spain | 36.43 | Petter Menning; Sweden | 36.71 | Kolos Csizmadia; Hungary | 36.82 |
| K–1 500 m | Josef Dostál; Czech Republic | 1:42.45 | Jean van der Westhuyzen; Australia | 1:43.57 | Fernando Pimenta; Portugal | 1:44.06 |
| K–1 1000 m | Bálint Kopasz; Hungary | 3:38.93 | Fernando Pimenta; Portugal | 3:38.98 | Jacob Schopf; Germany | 3:40.27 |
| K–1 5000 m | Joakim Lindberg; Sweden | 21:34.26 | Tamás Grossmann; Germany | 21:51.39 | Francisco Cubelos; Spain | 21:54.46 |
| K–2 500 m | Hungary; Bence Nádas; Bálint Kopasz | 1:34.98 | Lithuania; Mindaugas Maldonis; Andrejus Olijnikas | 1:35.56 | Australia; Jean van der Westhuyzen; Thomas Green | 1:35.85 |
| K–2 1000 m | Germany; Martin Hiller; Tamás Grossmann | 3:32.47 | Italy; Samuele Burgo; Andrea Schera | 3:36.82 | Hungary; Bálint Noé; Tamás Kulifai | 3:37.77 |
| K–4 500 m | Spain; Saúl Craviotto; Carlos Arévalo; Marcus Walz; Rodrigo Germade | 1:20.83 | Germany; Max Rendschmidt; Tom Liebscher; Jacob Schopf; Max Lemke | 1:21.27 | Ukraine; Oleh Kukharyk; Dmytro Danylenko; Ihor Trunov; Ivan Semykin | 1:21.38 |

=== Women ===
Non-Olympic classes

==== Canoe ====
| Event | Gold | | Silver | | Bronze | |
|---|---|---|---|---|---|---|
| C–1 200 m | Nevin Harrison; United States | 49.87 | María Corbera; Spain | 50.54 | Lin Wenjun; China | 50.55 |
| C–1 500 m | Liudmyla Luzan; Ukraine | 2:22.34 | Sophia Jensen; Canada | 2:23.21 | María Mailliard; Chile | 2:24.43 |
| C–1 1000 m | Liudmyla Luzan; Ukraine | 4:47.90 | María Mailliard; Chile | 4:50.02 | Annika Loske; Germany | 4:51.46 |
| C–1 5000 m | Katie Vincent; Canada | 27:50.88 | Annika Loske; Germany | 27:55.52 | María Corbera; Spain | 28:02.52 |
| C–2 200 m | Cuba; Yarisleidis Cirilo; Katherin Nuevo | 45.09 | China; Lin Wenjun; Shuai Changwen | 45.24 | Hungary; Giada Bragato; Bianka Nagy | 47.59 |
| C–2 500 m | China; Xu Shixiao; Sun Mengya | 2:01.26 | Ukraine; Liudmyla Luzan; Anastasiia Chetverikova | 2:03.32 | Hungary; Giada Bragato; Bianka Nagy | 2:04.70 |
| C–4 500 m | Canada; Sophia Jensen; Sloan MacKenzie; Katie Vincent; Julia Osende | 1:56.14 | Poland; Sylwia Szczerbińska; Aleksandra Jacewicz; Katarzyna Szperkiewicz; Julia Walczak | 1:56.31 | Hungary; Giada Bragato; Virág Balla; Kincső Takács; Bianka Nagy | 1:57.39 |

==== Kayak ====
| Event | Gold | | Silver | | Bronze | |
|---|---|---|---|---|---|---|
| K–1 200 m | Lisa Carrington; New Zealand | 41.94 | Anja Osterman; Slovenia | 42.94 | Anna Lucz; Hungary | 43.09 |
| K–1 500 m | Lisa Carrington; New Zealand | 1:58.69 | Anamaria Govorčinović; Croatia | 1:59.97 | Jule Hake; Germany | 2:00.30 |
| K–1 1000 m | Alyssa Bull; Australia | 4:27.65 | Eszter Rendessy; Hungary | 4:28.97 | Anamaria Govorčinović; Croatia | 4:33.62 |
| K–1 5000 m | Emese Kőhalmi; Hungary | 23:56.44 | Jule Hake; Germany | 24:00.17 | Jennifer Egan-Simmons; Ireland; Sára Mihalik; Finland | 24:41.51 |
| K–2 200 m | Hungary; Blanka Kiss; Anna Lucz | 38.76 | Spain; Sara Ouzande; Teresa Portela | 38.96 | Canada; Andréanne Langlois; Toshka Hrebacka | 38.99 |
| K–2 500 m | Poland; Karolina Naja; Anna Puławska | 1:49.87 | Germany; Paulina Paszek; Jule Hake | 1:50.28 | Belgium; Hermien Peters; Lize Broekx | 1:52.64 |
| K–4 500 m | Poland; Karolina Naja; Anna Puławska; Adrianna Kąkol; Dominika Putto | 1:30.70 | Australia; Ella Beere; Alyssa Bull; Alexandra Clarke; Yale Steinepreis | 1:32.78 | Mexico; Karina Alanís; Isabel Romero; Beatriz Briones; Maricela Montemayor | 1:33.24 |

=== Mixed ===
Non-Olympic classes

| Event | Gold | | Silver | | Bronze | |
|---|---|---|---|---|---|---|
| C–2 500 m | Canada; Connor Fitzpatrick; Katie Vincent | 1:56.87 | Germany; Sebastian Brendel; Sophie Koch | 1:58.84 | Poland; Aleksander Kitewski; Sylwia Szczerbińska | 1:59.17 |
| K–2 500 m | Australia; Alyssa Bull; Jackson Collins | 1:39.49 | Portugal; Teresa Portela; Fernando Pimenta | 1:39.79 | Germany; Tobias Schultz; Caroline Arft | 1:39.81 |

== Paracanoe ==
=== Medal table ===
* Host nation (Canada)

| Rank | Nation | Gold | Silver | Bronze | Total |
|---|---|---|---|---|---|
| 1 | Great Britain | 5 | 4 | 1 | 10 |
| 2 | Ukraine | 2 | 1 | 0 | 3 |
| 3 | Brazil | 1 | 2 | 1 | 4 |
| 4 | Germany | 1 | 0 | 2 | 3 |
| 5 | Australia | 1 | 0 | 1 | 2 |
| 5 | Hungary | 1 | 0 | 1 | 2 |
| 7 | Spain | 1 | 0 | 0 | 1 |
| 8 | Canada* | 0 | 1 | 1 | 2 |
| 8 | Chile | 0 | 1 | 1 | 2 |
| 8 | France | 0 | 1 | 1 | 2 |
| 11 | India | 0 | 1 | 0 | 1 |
| 11 | Italy | 0 | 1 | 0 | 1 |
| 13 | New Zealand | 0 | 0 | 1 | 1 |
| 13 | Portugal | 0 | 0 | 1 | 1 |
| 13 | Uzbekistan | 0 | 0 | 1 | 1 |
| Totals (15 entries) | | 12 | 12 | 12 | 36 |

=== Medal events ===
Non-Paralympic classes

| Event | Gold | | Silver | | Bronze | |
|---|---|---|---|---|---|---|
| Men's KL1 | Péter Pál Kiss; Hungary | 48.40 | Luis Cardoso da Silva; Brazil | 49.14 | Remy Boulle; France | 50.98 |
| Men's KL2 | Mykola Syniuk; Ukraine | 42.97 | David Phillipson; Great Britain | 43.95 | Scott Martlew; New Zealand | 44.21 |
| Men's KL3 | Juan Valle; Spain | 41.68 | Robert Oliver; Great Britain | 41.70 | Dylan Littlehales; Australia | 41.76 |
| Men's VL1 | Benjamin Sainsbury; Australia | 1:10.25 | Alessio Bedin; Italy | 1:12.54 | Robinson Mendez; Chile | 1:14.74 |
| Men's VL2 | Igor Tofalini; Brazil | 51.67 | Fernando Rufino de Paulo; Brazil | 52.00 | Norberto Mourão; Portugal | 53.26 |
| Men's VL3 | Jack Eyers; Great Britain | 47.13 | Vladyslav Yepifanov; Ukraine | 47.29 | Khaytmurot Sherkuziev; Uzbekistan | 47.92 |
| Women's KL1 | Maryna Mazhula; Ukraine | 51.86 | Katherinne Wollermann; Chile | 52.32 | Brianna Hennessy; Canada | 52.89 |
| Women's KL2 | Charlotte Henshaw; Great Britain | 47.60 | Emma Wiggs; Great Britain | 48.29 | Katalin Varga; Hungary | 49.97 |
| Women's KL3 | Laura Sugar; Great Britain | 46.48 | Nélia Barbosa; France | 46.84 | Felicia Laberer; Germany | 46.93 |
| Women's VL1 | Lillemor Köper; Germany | 1:29.79 | Pooja Ojha; India | 1:34.18 | Esther Bode; Germany | 1:35.16 |
| Women's VL2 | Emma Wiggs; Great Britain | 58.44 | Brianna Hennessy; Canada | 1:01.42 | Jeanette Chippington; Great Britain | 1:03.03 |
| Women's VL3 | Charlotte Henshaw; Great Britain | 59.58 | Hope Gordon; Great Britain | 1:00.84 | Mari Santilli; Brazil | 1:03.97 |
