= Nicholas Matveev =

Canadian sprint kayaker

Nick Matveev
Personal information
- Full name: Nicholas Matveev
- Born: August 7, 1997 (age 29) Toronto, Ontario, Canada
- Height: 185 cm (6 ft 1 in)
Medal record
Men's Kayaking
Representing Canada
Pan American Games
Silver medal – second place	2023 Santiago	K-4 500 metres

Nicholas Matveev (born August 7, 1997) is a Canadian sprint kayaker.

== Career ==
At the World Championships, as part of the K4 boat, Matveev finished in ninth in the second semifinal, failing to qualify for the finals. A year later, the boat finished in fifth in the B final (14th overall).

In May 2021, Matveev was named to Canada's 2020 Olympic team. In September 2023, Matveev was named to Canada's 2023 Pan American Games team.

In June 2024, Matveev was named to Canada's 2024 Olympic team.
