= Oleh Kukharyk =

Ukrainian canoeist (born 1997)

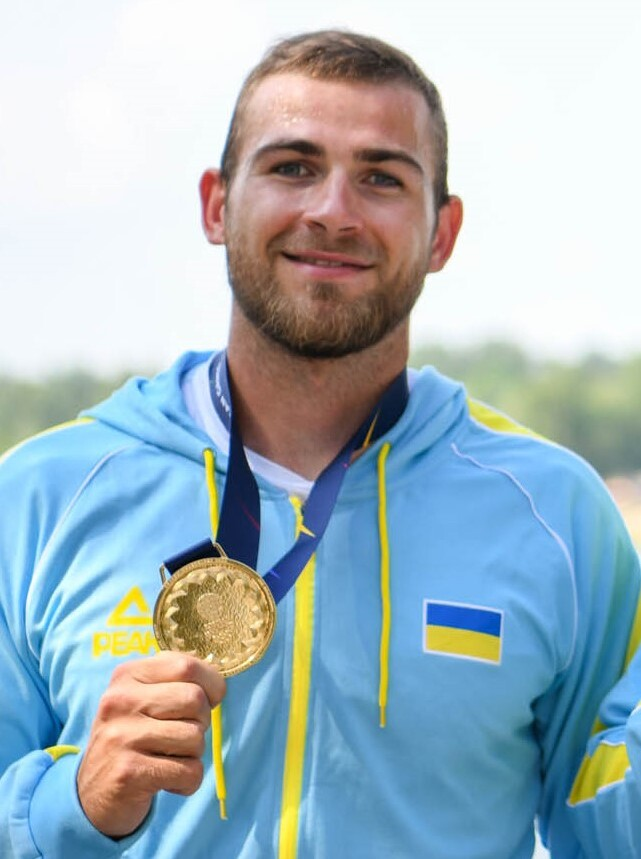
- Kukharyk at the 2023 European Games

Personal information
- Full name: Oleh Volodymyrovych Kukharyk
- Nationality: Ukrainian
- Born: 25 April 1997 (age 29) Komsomolsk, Ukraine
- Height: 189 cm (6 ft 2 in)
- Weight: 88 kg (194 lb)

Sport
- Country: Ukraine
- Sport: Sprint kayak
Medal record
Men's sprint kayak
Representing Ukraine
World Championships
Gold medal – first place	2021 Copenhagen	K-4 500 m
Bronze medal – third place	2017 Račice	K-1 500 m
Bronze medal – third place	2022 Dartmouth	K-4 500 m
Bronze medal – third place	2023 Duisburg	K-4 500 m
European Games
Gold medal – first place	2023 Kraków-Małopolska	K-2 500 m
Silver medal – second place	2019 Minsk	K-2 1000 m
Silver medal – second place	2023 Kraków-Małopolska	K-4 500 m
European Championships
Silver medal – second place	2018 Belgrade	K-1 500 m
Silver medal – second place	2021 Poznań	K-2 500 m

Oleh Volodymyrovych Kukharyk (Ukrainian: Олег Володимирович Кухарик; born 25 April 1997) is a Ukrainian sprint canoer.

== Career ==
He is a 2021 World champion, bronze medallists of the 2017 and 2022 World Championships as well as a silver medallist of the 2018 European Championships.

== Major results ==
=== Olympic Games ===
Year	K-2 500	K-4 500
2024	6 QF	4

=== World championships ===
Year	K-1 500	K-1 1000	K-2 500	K-2 1000	K-4 500
2015	9	6 H			—N/a
2017	3rd place, bronze medalist(s)			9	
2018	5				8 SF
2019	8			3 FB	
2021			5		1st place, gold medalist(s)
2022			6		3rd place, bronze medalist(s)
2023					3rd place, bronze medalist(s)
2024	9	—N/a	—N/a		—N/a

== Personal life ==
He graduated from the V.О. Sukhomlynskyi National University of Mykolaiv.
