= Adam Botek =

Slovak sprint canoeist

Personal information
- Nationality: Slovak
- Born: 5 March 1997 (age 29) Komárno, Slovakia
- Height: 1.93 m (6 ft 4 in)
- Weight: 93 kg (205 lb)

Sport
- Country: Slovakia
- Sport: Sprint kayak
Medal record
Men's sprint kayak
Representing Slovakia
Olympic Games
Bronze medal – third place	2020 Tokyo	K-4 500 m
World Championships
Silver medal – second place	2017 Račice	K-2 1000 m
Silver medal – second place	2021 Copenhagen	K-4 500 m
Bronze medal – third place	2019 Szeged	K-4 500 m
European Games
Bronze medal – third place	2019 Minsk	K-4 500 m
European Championships
Silver medal – second place	2021 Poznań	K-2 1000 m
Silver medal – second place	2021 Poznań	K-4 500 m
Silver medal – second place	2022 Munich	K-4 500 m

Adam Botek (Hungarian: Botek Ádám; born 5 March 1997) is a Slovak sprint canoeist who competed at the 2020 Summer Olympics.

He won a medal at the 2019 ICF Canoe Sprint World Championships.
