= Pierre-Luc Poulin =

Canadian sprint kayaker

Personal information
- Born: December 21, 1995 (age 30) Quebec City, Quebec, Canada
Medal record
Men's Kayaking
Representing Canada
Pan American Games
Silver medal – second place	2023 Santiago	K-4 500 metres
Bronze medal – third place	2015 Toronto	K-2 200 m

Pierre-Luc Poulin (born December 21, 1995) is a Canadian sprint kayaker. He won several World Cup and international medals.

== Career ==
At the age of 19, at the 2015 Pan American Games Poulin won the bronze medal in the K-2 200 m event.

In May 2021, Poulin was named to Canada's 2020 Olympic team. In September 2023, Poulin was named to Canada's 2023 Pan American Games team. In June 2024, Poulin was named to Canada's 2024 Olympic team.
