= Simon McTavish (canoeist) =

Canadian sprint kayaker

Personal information
- Born: July 19, 1996 (age 29) Oakville, Ontario

Sport
- Sport: Kayaking
Medal record
Men's canoe sprint
Representing Canada
Pan American Games
Gold medal – first place	2023 Santiago	K2 500 m
Silver medal – second place	2023 Santiago	K4 500 m
Representing Australia
World University Canoe Sprint Championships
Gold medal – first place	2018 Szolnok	K1 500 m
Bronze medal – third place	2018 Szolnok	K1 200 m

Simon McTavish (born July 19, 1996) is a Canadian male sprint kayaker. Born in Oakville, Ontario, Simon McTavish moved with his family to Sydney, Australia where he began paddling in 2011 at the age of 14. He represented Australia for 7 years from 2012 to 2018 on Olympic Hopes, Junior, U23 and Senior Teams. After successful international results in 2018, winning medals for Australia at the U23 World Championships and the FISU World University Games, the opportunity presented itself to return home to Canada and Simon jumped at it.

In 2019, at the conclusion of his Project Management Degree at the University of Sydney, Simon moved back to Canada and secured his spot on the Canadian National Team in May at the Olympic Basin in Montreal, Canada, winning the k1 1000m and the k4 500m races. In 2019 he qualified an Olympic quota spot for Canada at the World Championships in Szeged, Hungary with his teammates Mark de Jonge, Pierre Luc Poulin, and Nicholas Matveev in the K4 500m. Simon went on to fulfil his dream of competing for Canada at the 2020 Olympic Games in Tokyo, taking place in August 2021 due to the COVID-19 pandemic.

Since moving to Canada Simon has represented the Mississauga Canoe Club domestically earning 11 National Championship titles to his name. Simon currently defends the national champion title across all K1 distances in Canada.

At the 2022 World Championship taking in Dartmouth, Canada Simon placed 4th in the K1 5000m, 5th in the k4 500m, and 10th in the K2 500m races. He then went on to finish his 2022 season at the Pan American Championships with a 1st place in the K4 500m, 1st place in the k1 500m, and 2nd place in the k1 1000m races.

== Career ==
In May 2021, McTavish was named to Canada's 2020 Olympic team.
