= Mindaugas Maldonis =

Lithuanian canoeist (born 1991)

Personal information
- Born: 30 March 1991 (age 35)

Sport
- Sport: Canoe sprint
Medal record
Representing Lithuania
World Championships
Silver medal – second place	2022 Dartmouth	K-2 500 m
European Championships
Bronze medal – third place	2022 Munich	K-2 500 m
Bronze medal – third place	2024 Szeged	K-2 500 m
World Cup
Gold medal – first place	2021 Barnaul	K-1 200 m

Mindaugas Maldonis (born 30 March 1991) is a Lithuanian sprint canoeist. Competing in the individual K-1 200 m event he won gold in 2021 World Cup stage 2 in Barnaul.

In 2021 Maldonis was selected to represent Lithuania at the 2020 Summer Olympics. At the 2022 ICF Canoe Sprint World Championships Maldonis together with Andrejus Olijnikas won the silver medal in the K-2 500 m event.
