= 2025 ICF Canoe Sprint World Championships – Men's K-4 500 metres =

Men's K-4 500 metres at the 2025 ICF Canoe Sprint World Championships
- Venue: Idroscalo Regatta Course
- Location: Milan, Italy
- Dates: 20–22 August
- Competitors: 108 from 27 nations
- Winning time: 1:18.93

Medalists
gold medal	Gustavo Gonçalves; João Ribeiro; Messias Baptista; Pedro Casinha	Portugal
silver medal	Márk Opavszky; Bence Fodor; Gergely Balogh; Zsombor Tamási	Hungary
bronze medal	Adrián del Río; Alex Graneri; Carlos Arévalo; Rodrigo Germade	Spain

The men's K-4 500 metres competition at the 2025 ICF Canoe Sprint World Championships in Milan took place in Idroscalo Regatta Course.

== Schedule ==
The schedule is as follows:

Date	Time	Round
Wednesday 20 August 2025	09:24	Heats
Thursday 21 August 2025	14:12	Semifinals
Friday 22 August 2025	14:31	Final B
Friday 22 August 2025	15:11	Final A

== Results ==
=== Heats ===
The fastest boat in each heat advanced directly to the final (FA). The next six fastest boats in each heat advanced to the semifinal (QS).

==== Heat 1 ====
Rank	Canoeist	Country	Time	Notes
1	Adrián del Río; Alex Graneri; Carlos Arévalo; Rodrigo Germade	Spain	1:21.33	FA
2	Márk Opavszky; Bence Fodor; Gergely Balogh; Zsombor Tamási	Hungary	1:21.46	QS
3	Jakub Stepun; Valerii Vichev; Sławomir Witczak; Jaroslaw Kajdanek	Poland	1:22.80	QS
4	Max Rendschmidt; Anton Winkelmann; Jacob Schopf; Max Lemke	Germany	1:22.87	QS
5	Gustav Bock; Lasse Bro Madsen; Morten Graversen; Victor Gairy Aasmul	Denmark	1:23.56	QS
6	Bu Tingkai; Liang Fengwei; Wang Chi; Zhang Dong	China	1:24.29	QS
7	Masaya Tanaka; Ryuji Matsushiro; Akihiro Inoue; Taishi Tanada	Japan	1:25.99	QS
8	Sean Talbert; Aaron Small; Cole Jones; Augustus Cook	United States	1:27.43	
9	Koh Teck Wai Daniel; Jovi Jayden Kalaichelvan; Ooi Brandon Wei Cheng; Alden Ler	Singapore	1:33.51	

==== Heat 2 ====
Rank	Canoeist	Country	Time	Notes
1	Mikita Borykau; Uladzislau Kravets; Uladzislau Litvinau; Dzmitry Natynchyk	Individual Neutral Athletes	1:21.37	FA
2	Aleksandr Sergeyev; Vitaly Ershov; Maxim Spesivtsev; Viktor Gavrilenko	Individual Neutral Athletes	1:21.41	QS
3	Simonas Maldonis; Viktor Čaplinskij; Ignas Navakauskas; Artūras Seja	Lithuania	1:21.61	QS
4	Manfredi Rizza; Francesco Lanciotti; Nicola Volo; Giovanni Penato	Italy	1:21.94	QS
5	Bram Sikkens; Artuur Peters; Rafaël Bastiaens; Louis Vangeel	Belgium	1:22.80	QS
6	Oleh Kukharyk; Dmytro Danylenko; Ihor Trunov; Oleksandr Zaitsev	Ukraine	1:23.38	QS
7	Andjelo Džombeta; Milos Stojkov; Stefan Vrdoljak; Zarko Jakovljevic	Serbia	1:24.60	QS
8	Milan Dörner; Dominik Doktorik; Juraj Kukučka; Daniel Rybanský	Slovakia	1:25.68	
9	Subhi Subhi; Dede Sunandar; Wandi Wandi; Indra Hidayat	Indonesia	1:29.23	

==== Heat 3 ====
Rank	Canoeist	Country	Time	Notes
1	Gustavo Gonçalves; João Ribeiro; Messias Baptista; Pedro Casinha	Portugal	1:21.34	FA
2	Michal Kulich; Daniel Havel; Jakub Špicar; Radek Šlouf	Czech Republic	1:22.35	QS
3	Grant Clancy; James Munro; Kacey Ngataki; Kalani Gilbertson	New Zealand	1:23.34	QS
4	Cho Gwang-hee; Choi Min-kyu; Jang Sang-won; Kim Hyo-bin	South Korea	1:24.24	QS
5	Hugo Lagerstam; Johan Myrberg; Jesper Johansson; Karl Brodén	Sweden	1:24.93	QS
6	Luca Lauper; Sven Hirzel; Donat Donhauser; Fynn Wyss	Switzerland	1:25.64	QS
7	Shakhriyor Makhkamov; Oleksandr Zarubin; Lochinbek Esonaliev; Shokhrukhbek Azamov	Uzbekistan	1:25.67	QS
8	Tomthilnganba Ngashepam; Himanshu Tandan; Varinder Singh; Rimson Mairembam	India	1:33.49	
9	Edgar Tutyan; Artur Akishin; Tigran Khachatryan; Karen Sultanyan	Armenia	1:40.61	

=== Semifinals ===
The fastest three boats in each semi advanced to the A final. The next four fastest boats in each semi and best 8th advanced to the final B.

==== Semifinal 1 ====
Rank	Canoeist	Country	Time	Notes
1	Márk Opavszky; Bence Fodor; Gergely Balogh; Zsombor Tamási	Hungary	1:19.88	FA
2	Max Rendschmidt; Anton Winkelmann; Jacob Schopf; Max Lemke	Germany	1:20.04	FA
3	Simonas Maldonis; Viktor Čaplinskij; Ignas Navakauskas; Artūras Seja	Lithuania	1:21.27	FA
4	Bu Tingkai; Liang Fengwei; Wang Chi; Zhang Dong	China	1:21.77	FB
5	Andjelo Džombeta; Milos Stojkov; Stefan Vrdoljak; Zarko Jakovljevic	Serbia	1:22.31	FB
6	Bram Sikkens; Artuur Peters; Rafaël Bastiaens; Louis Vangeel	Belgium	1:22.47	FB
7	Grant Clancy; James Munro; Kacey Ngataki; Kalani Gilbertson	New Zealand	1:23.34	FB
8	Cho Gwang-hee; Choi Min-kyu; Jang Sang-won; Kim Hyo-bin	South Korea	1:24.23	fB
9	Luca Lauper; Sven Hirzel; Donat Donhauser; Fynn Wyss	Switzerland	1:24.82	

==== Semifinal 2 ====
Rank	Canoeist	Country	Time	Notes
1	Manfredi Rizza; Francesco Lanciotti; Nicola Volo; Giovanni Penato	Italy	1:20.42	FA
2	Jakub Stepun; Valerii Vichev; Sławomir Witczak; Jaroslaw Kajdanek	Poland	1:20.49	FA
3	Michal Kulich; Daniel Havel; Jakub Špicar; Radek Šlouf	Czech Republic	1:20.63	FA
4	Gustav Bock; Lasse Bro Madsen; Morten Graversen; Victor Gairy Aasmul	Denmark	1:20.78	FB
5	Aleksandr Sergeyev; Vitaly Ershov; Maxim Spesivtsev; Viktor Gavrilenko	Individual Neutral Athletes	1:20.86	FB
6	Oleh Kukharyk; Dmytro Danylenko; Ihor Trunov; Oleksandr Zaitsev	Ukraine	1:21.07	FB
7	Hugo Lagerstam; Johan Myrberg; Jesper Johansson; Karl Brodén	Sweden	1:23.30	FB
8	Ryuji Matsushiro; Masaya Tanaka; Akihiro Inoue; Taishi Tanada	Japan	1:24.49	
9	Shakhriyor Makhkamov; Oleksandr Zarubin; Lochinbek Esonaliev; Shokhrukhbek Azamov	Uzbekistan	1:26.53	

=== Finals ===
==== Final B ====
Competitors in this final raced for positions 10 to 18.

Rank	Canoeist	Country	Time	Notes
1	Gustav Bock; Lasse Bro Madsen; Morten Graversen; Victor Gairy Aasmul	Denmark	1:21.21	
2	Aleksandr Sergeyev; Vitaly Ershov; Maxim Spesivtsev; Viktor Gavrilenko	Individual Neutral Athletes	1:21.32	
3	Bram Sikkens; Artuur Peters; Rafaël Bastiaens; Louis Vangeel	Belgium	1:22.09	
4	Bu Tingkai; Liang Fengwei; Wang Chi; Zhang Dong	China	1:22.54	
5	Cho Gwang-hee; Choi Min-kyu; Jang Sang-won; Kim Hyo-bin	South Korea	1:22.88	
6	Grant Clancy; James Munro; Kacey Ngataki; Kalani Gilbertson	New Zealand	1:23.48	
7	Oleh Kukharyk; Dmytro Danylenko; Ihor Trunov; Oleksandr Zaitsev	Ukraine	1:23.85	
8	Hugo Lagerstam; Johan Myrberg; Jesper Johansson; Karl Brodén	Sweden	1:24.10	
9	Andjelo Džombeta; Milos Stojkov; Stefan Vrdoljak; Zarko Jakovljevic	Serbia	1:24.92	

==== Final A ====
Competitors raced for positions 1 to 9, with medals going to the top three.

Rank	Canoeist	Country	Time	Notes
1st place, gold medalist(s)	Gustavo Gonçalves; João Ribeiro; Messias Baptista; Pedro Casinha	Portugal	1:18.93	
2nd place, silver medalist(s)	Márk Opavszky; Bence Fodor; Gergely Balogh; Zsombor Tamási	Hungary	1:18.98	
3rd place, bronze medalist(s)	Adrián del Río; Alex Graneri; Carlos Arévalo; Rodrigo Germade	Spain	1:19.33	
4	Max Rendschmidt; Anton Winkelmann; Jacob Schopf; Max Lemke	Germany	1:19.57	
5	Simonas Maldonis; Viktor Čaplinskij; Ignas Navakauskas; Artūras Seja	Lithuania	1:20.21	
6	Michal Kulich; Daniel Havel; Jakub Špicar; Radek Šlouf	Czech Republic	1:20.63	
7	Manfredi Rizza; Francesco Lanciotti; Nicola Volo; Giovanni Penato	Italy	1:20.68	
8	Jakub Stepun; Valerii Vichev; Sławomir Witczak; Jaroslaw Kajdanek	Poland	1:21.12	
9	Mikita Borykau; Uladzislau Kravets; Uladzislau Litvinau; Dzmitry Natynchyk	Individual Neutral Athletes	1:21.92	
