= 2026 ICF Canoe Sprint World Championships – Men's K-4 500 metres =

Men's K-4 500 metres at the 2026 ICF Canoe Sprint World Championships
- Location: Poznań, Poland
- Dates: 26–28 August
- Competitors: 108 from 27 nations
- Winning time: 1:23.95

Medalists
gold medal	Max Rendschmidt; Max Lemke; Jacob Schopf; Tom Liebscher	Germany
silver medal	Jean van der Westhuyzen; Pierre van der Westhuyzen; Riley Fitzsimmons; Noah Havard	Australia
bronze medal	Gustavo Gonçalves; João Ribeiro; Messias Baptista; Pedro Casinha	Portugal

The men's K-4 500 metres competition at the 2026 ICF Canoe Sprint World Championships in Poznań took place in Lake Malta.

== Schedule ==
The schedule is as follows:

Date	Time	Round
Wednesday 26 August 2026	09:31	Heats
Thursday 27 August 2026	14:48	Semifinals
Friday 28 August 2025	14:27	Final B
Friday 28 August 2025	15:11	Final A

== Results ==
=== Heats ===
Four heats were held on morning of 26 August 2026.

Qualification rule : First six in each heat (SF) plus three next fastest (qBT) qualify for semi-finals; remainder are eliminated.

==== Heat 1 ====
Rank	Canoeist	Country	Time	Notes
1	Jean van der Westhuyzen; Pierre van der Westhuyzen; Riley Fitzsimmons; Noah Havard	Australia	1:23.48	SF
2	Simonas Maldonis; Viktor Čaplinskij; Ignas Navakauskas; Artūras Seja	Lithuania	1:23.90	QS
3	Jakub Stepun; Jaroslaw Kajdanek; Valerii Vichev; Sławomir Witczak	Poland	1:24.62	QS
4	Mikita Borykau; Uladzislau Litvinau; Ilyia Fedarenka; Dzmitry Natynchyk	Neutral Athletes B	1:25.78	QS
5	James Munro; Grant Clancy; Kurtis Imrie; Hamish Legarth	New Zealand	1:25.82	QS
6	Rafaël Bastiaens; Louis Vangeel; Artuur Peters; Raphael Akerele	Belgium	1:26.96	QS
7	Juraj Kukučka; Jakub Bartolčič; Alex Gavlider; Dominik Doktorik	Slovakia	1:27.12	qBT
8	Denis Klenin; Artyom Terechshenko; Zhakhongir Zhamedov; Igor Ryashentsev	Kazakhstan	1:30.72	

==== Heat 2 ====
Rank	Canoeist	Country	Time	Notes
1	Max Rendschmidt; Max Lemke; Jacob Schopf; Tom Liebscher	Germany	1:23.66	SF
2	Jakub Špicar; Jakub Brabec; Daniel Havel; Radek Šlouf	Czech Republic	1:24.45	SF
3	Francesco Lanciotti; Federico Zanutta; Nicola Volo; Giovanni Penato	Italy	1:25.46	SF
4	Cho Gwang-hee; Kim Hyo-bin; Jang Sang-won; Choi Min-kyu	South Korea	1:26.29	SF
5	Artem Korovin; Georgii Vaniashov; Viktor Gavrilenko; Maxim Spesivtsev	Neutral Athletes A	1:26.33	SF
6	Ziyodbek Yuldashaliev; Oleksandr Zarubin; Samandar Khaydarov; Ozodjon Amriddinov	Uzbekistan	1:29.08	SF
7	Hasan Saraç; Muhammet Emin Sulak; Taha Erkam Usta; Rahmi Kaan Karahan	Turkey	1:30.31	qBT
	Subhi Subhi; Dede Sunandar; Wandi Wandi; Indra Hidayat	Indonesia		

==== Heat 3 ====
Rank	Canoeist	Country	Time	Notes
1	Adrián del Río; Marcus Cooper; Carlos Arévalo; Rodrigo Germade	Spain	1:24.85	SF
2	Zarko Jakovljevic; Strahinja Dragosavljević; Marko Dragosavljević; Branko Lagundžić	Serbia	1:25.56	SF
3	Liang Fengwei; Ding Shengkai; Chen Weiyang; Wang Jinwei	China	1:27.07	SF
4	Nicholas Matveev; Mathieu Gilbert; Harris Hunter; Laurent Lavigne	Canada	1:27.33	SF
5	Luca Lauper; Sven Hirzel; Aaron Schmitter; Fynn Wyss	Switzerland	1:27.78	SF
6	Aaron Small; Sean Talbert; Jonas Ecker; Augustus Cook	United States	1:27.79	SF
7	Lev Lunin; Maxim Rogut; Ivan Vladimirov; Chirill Savcenco	Moldova	1:30.95	qBT
8	Ooi Brandon Wei Cheng; Alden Ler; Oliver Euan Bowhay; Wei Jie Sean Teo	Singapore	1:33.53	

==== Heat 4 ====
Rank	Canoeist	Country	Time	Notes
1	Gustavo Gonçalves; João Ribeiro; Messias Baptista; Pedro Casinha	Portugal	1:24.69	SF
2	Bence Nádas; Bence Fodor; Levente Kurucz; Sándor Tótka	Hungary	1:25.08	SF
3	Gustav Bock; Victor Gairy Aasmul; Morten Graversen; Simon Schuldt Hein	Denmark	1:25.29	SF
4	Oleh Kukharyk; Dmytro Danylenko; Ihor Trunov; Heorhii Seleznov	Ukraine	1:25.84	SF
5	Dennis Kernen; Erik Andersson; Karl Broden; Jesper Johansson	Sweden	1:28.71	SF
6	Joaquin Catalano; Manuel Orero; Gonzalo Carreras; Rubén Rézola	Argentina	1:30.02	SF
7	Naocha Singh Laitonjam; Varinder Singh; Oinam Arun Singh; Harshwardhan Singh Shaktawat	India	1:34.12	

=== Semifinals ===
Thre semifinals were held on morning of 27 August 2026.

Qualification rule : First three in each heat to A final (FA) next three in each heat to B final (FB); remainder are eliminated.

==== Semifinal 1 ====
Rank	Canoeist	Country	Time	Notes
1	Jean van der Westhuyzen; Pierre van der Westhuyzen; Riley Fitzsimmons; Noah Havard	Australia	1:24.99	FA
2	Gustav Bock; Victor Gairy Aasmul; Morten Graversen; Simon Schuldt Hein	Denmark	1:25.32	FA
3	Zarko Jakovljevic; Strahinja Dragosavljević; Marko Dragosavljević; Branko Lagundžić	Serbia	1:26.43	FA
4	Oleh Kukharyk; Dmytro Danylenko; Ihor Trunov; Heorhii Seleznov	Ukraine	1:26.70	FB
5	Jakub Špicar; Jakub Brabec; Daniel Havel; Radek Šlouf	Czech Republic	1:26.74	FB
6	James Munro; Grant Clancy; Kurtis Imrie; Hamish Legarth	New Zealand	1:28.56	FB
7	Luca Lauper; Sven Hirzel; Aaron Schmitter; Fynn Wyss	Switzerland	1:29.06	FB
8	Juraj Kukučka; Jakub Bartolčič; Alex Gavlider; Dominik Doktorik	Slovakia	1:30.11	fB
9	Ziyodbek Yuldashaliev; Oleksandr Zarubin; Samandar Khaydarov; Ozodjon Amriddinov	Uzbekistan	1:32.56	

==== Semifinal 2 ====
Rank	Canoeist	Country	Time	Notes
1	Max Rendschmidt; Max Lemke; Jacob Schopf; Tom Liebscher	Germany	1:25.99	FA
2	Jakub Stepun; Jaroslaw Kajdanek; Valerii Vichev; Sławomir Witczak	Poland	1:27.06	FA
3	Bence Nádas; Bence Fodor; Levente Kurucz; Sándor Tótka	Hungary	1:27.10	FA
4	Artem Korovin; Georgii Vaniashov; Viktor Gavrilenko; Maxim Spesivtsev	Neutral Athletes A	1:27.85	FB
5	Mikita Borykau; Uladzislau Litvinau; Ilyia Fedarenka; Dzmitry Natynchyk	Neutral Athletes B	1:28.48	FB
6	Liang Fengwei; Ding Shengkai; Chen Weiyang; Wang Jinwei	China	1:28.74	FB
7	Nicholas Matveev; Mathieu Gilbert; Harris Hunter; Laurent Lavigne	Canada	1:29.50	FB
8	Joaquin Catalano; Manuel Orero; Gonzalo Carreras; Rubén Rézola	Argentina	1:30.54	
9	Hasan Saraç; Muhammet Emin Sulak; Taha Erkam Usta; Rahmi Kaan Karahan	Turkey	1:35.18	

==== Semifinal 3 ====
Rank	Canoeist	Country	Time	Notes
1	Simonas Maldonis; Viktor Čaplinskij; Ignas Navakauskas; Artūras Seja	Lithuania	1:24.51	FA
2	Gustavo Gonçalves; João Ribeiro; Messias Baptista; Pedro Casinha	Portugal	1:24.61	FA
3	Adrián del Río; Marcus Cooper; Carlos Arévalo; Rodrigo Germade	Spain	1:24.79	FA
4	Francesco Lanciotti; Federico Zanutta; Nicola Volo; Giovanni Penato	Italy	1:26.86	FB
5	Aaron Small; Sean Talbert; Jonas Ecker; Augustus Cook	United States	1:27.25	FB
6	Cho Gwang-hee; Kim Hyo-bin; Jang Sang-won; Choi Min-kyu	South Korea	1:27.37	FB
7	Rafaël Bastiaens; Louis Vangeel; Artuur Peters; Raphael Akerele	Belgium	1:28.26	FB
8	Dennis Kernen; Erik Andersson; Karl Broden; Jesper Johansson	Sweden	1:29.44	
9	Lev Lunin; Maxim Rogut; Ivan Vladimirov; Chirill Savcenco	Moldova	1:33.50	

=== Finals ===
The A and B finals were held on the afternoon of 28 August.

B Final

Rank	Canoeist	Country	Time	Notes
1	Francesco Lanciotti; Federico Zanutta; Nicola Volo; Giovanni Penato	Italy	1:27.12	
2	Jakub Špicar; Jakub Brabec; Daniel Havel; Radek Šlouf	Czech Republic	1:27.52	
3	Artem Korovin; Georgii Vaniashov; Viktor Gavrilenko; Maxim Spesivtsev	Neutral Athletes A	1:27.59	
4	James Munro; Grant Clancy; Kurtis Imrie; Hamish Legarth	New Zealand	1:28.43	
5	Oleh Kukharyk; Dmytro Danylenko; Ihor Trunov; Heorhii Seleznov	Ukraine	1:28.80	
6	Liang Fengwei; Ding Shengkai; Chen Weiyang; Wang Jinwei	China	1:29.24	
7	Mikita Borykau; Uladzislau Litvinau; Ilyia Fedarenka; Dzmitry Natynchyk	Neutral Athletes B	1:30.46	
8	Cho Gwang-hee; Kim Hyo-bin; Jang Sang-won; Choi Min-kyu	South Korea	1:30.96	
9	Aaron Small; Sean Talbert; Jonas Ecker; Augustus Cook	United States	1:31.12	

A Final

Rank	Canoeist	Country	Time	Notes
1st place, gold medalist(s)	Max Rendschmidt; Max Lemke; Jacob Schopf; Tom Liebscher	Germany	1:23.95	
2nd place, silver medalist(s)	Jean van der Westhuyzen; Pierre van der Westhuyzen; Riley Fitzsimmons; Noah Havard	Australia	1:24.57	
3rd place, bronze medalist(s)	Gustavo Gonçalves; João Ribeiro; Messias Baptista; Pedro Casinha	Portugal	1:25.53	
4	Zarko Jakovljevic; Strahinja Dragosavljević; Marko Dragosavljević; Branko Lagundžić	Serbia	1:25.76	
5	Bence Nádas; Bence Fodor; Levente Kurucz; Sándor Tótka	Hungary	1:26.00	
6	Simonas Maldonis; Viktor Čaplinskij; Ignas Navakauskas; Artūras Seja	Lithuania	1:26.01	
7	Jakub Stepun; Jaroslaw Kajdanek; Valerii Vichev; Sławomir Witczak	Poland	1:26.08	
8	Adrián del Río; Marcus Cooper; Carlos Arévalo; Rodrigo Germade	Spain	1:26.91	
9	Gustav Bock; Victor Gairy Aasmul; Morten Graversen; Simon Schuldt Hein	Denmark	1:27.20	
