= 2022 ICF World Junior and U23 Canoe Sprint Championships =

- Location: Szeged, Hungary
- Dates: 31 August – 4 September 2022

The 2022 ICF World Junior and U23 Canoe Sprint Championships (23rd Junior and 9th U23) took place in Szeged, Hungary from 31 August to 4 September 2022.

== Schedule ==
Preliminary schedule of 2022 ICF Canoe Sprint Junior & U23 World Championships

Junior
Event↓/Date→	Wed 31		Thu 1		Fri 2	Sat 3	Sun 4
Men's K–1 500 m					H	½	F
Men's K–1 1000 m			H	½		F	
Men's K–1 5000 m							F
Men's K–2 500 m			H	½		F	
Men's K–2 1000 m	H	½			F		
Men's K–4 500 m	H	½			F		
Men's C–1 500 m					H	½	F
Men's C–1 1000 m	H	½			F		
Men's C–1 5000 m							F
Men's C–2 500 m	H	½			F		
Men's C–2 1000 m			H	½		F	
Men's C–4 500 m			H	½		F	
Women's K–1 200 m	H	½			F		
Women's K–1 500 m					H	½	F
Women's K–1 1000 m			H	½		F	
Women's K–1 5000 m							F
Women's K–2 500 m			H	½		F	
Women's K–4 500 m	H	½			F		
Women's C–1 200 m					H	½	F
Women's C–1 500 m			H	½		F	
Women's C–1 1000 m	H	½			F		
Women's C–1 5000 m							F
Women's C–2 500 m	H	½			F		
Women's C–4 500 m			H	½		F	
Mixed K–2 500 m	H		½			F	
Mixed C–2 500 m	H		½			F	

U23
Event↓/Date→	Wed 31		Thu 1		Fri 2	Sat 3	Sun 4
Men's K–1 500 m					H	½	F
Men's K–1 1000 m			H	½		F	
Men's K–1 5000 m							F
Men's K–2 500 m			H	½		F	
Men's K–2 1000 m	H	½			F		
Men's K–4 500 m	H	½			F		
Men's C–1 500 m					H	½	F
Men's C–1 1000 m	H	½			F		
Men's C–1 5000 m							F
Men's C–2 500 m	H	½			F		
Men's C–2 1000 m			H	½		F	
Men's C–4 500 m			H	½		F	
Women's K–1 200 m	H	½			F		
Women's K–1 500 m					H	½	F
Women's K–1 1000 m			H	½		F	
Women's K–1 5000 m							F
Women's K–2 500 m			H	½		F	
Women's K–4 500 m	H	½			F		
Women's C–1 200 m					H	½	F
Women's C–1 500 m			H	½		F	
Women's C–1 1000 m	H	½			F		
Women's C–1 5000 m							F
Women's C–2 500 m	H	½			F		
Women's C–4 500 m			H	½		F	
Mixed K–2 500 m			H		½		F
Mixed C–2 500 m			H		½		F

== Medalists ==
=== Junior ===
==== Men ====
Event	Gold		Silver		Bronze	
K–1 500 m	Hungary; Hunor Hidvegi	1.43.89	Slovenia; Matevž Manfreda	1:44.48	Spain; Marcos Caballero	1:44.54
K–1 1000 m	Hungary; Zsombor Panyik	3:34.76	Spain; Marcos Caballero	3:36.34	Germany; Lukas Fredrich	3:37.56
K–1 5000 m	Spain; Marcos Caballero	21:03.71	Hungary; Almos Aradi	21:06.41	Germany; Paul Grosser	21:23.39
K–2 500 m	Hungary; Bence Ozsgyáni; Gergő Keller	1:31.50	Poland; Alex Borucki; Jaroslaw Kajdanek	1:32.30	Germany; Tillman Sommer; Jonas Borkowski	1:32.32
K–2 1000 m	Hungary; Botond Szakács; Peter Samu	3:19.28	Italy; Federico Zanutta; Luca Micotti	3:21.30	Czech Republic; Lukáš Hrábek; Jakub Niebauer	3:21.51
K–4 500 m	Hungary; Bence Ozsgyáni; Zalán Hidvégi; Hunor Hidvégi; Gergő Keller	1:22.42	Germany; Maximilian Götzl; Paul Grosser; Max Kopaczewski; Leon Reckzeh	1:23.72	Belgium; Lars Billiet; Stanislas Bastiaens; Louis Vangeel; Raphaël Akerele	1:24.44
C–1 500 m	Georgia; Aleksandre Tsivsivadze	1:53.16	Spain; Daniel Grijalba	1:53.26	Moldova; Mihail Culceac	1:53.71
C–1 1000 m	Germany; David Töpel	3:56.15	Poland; Kacper Sieradzan	3:56.98	Moldova; Mihail Culceac	3:57.63
C–1 5000 m	Poland; Eryk Wilga	24:10.11	Czech Republic; Adam Rudolf	24:24.97	Canada; Peter Bradley	24:29.20
C–2 500 m	Hungary; Csanád Molnár; István Juhász	1:42.99	Canada; Zachary Kralik; Viktor Hardy	1:45.43	Ukraine; Yaroslav Verbliud; Vitalii Prystai	1:46.35
C–2 1000 m	Hungary; Csanád Molnár; István Juhász	3:42.89	Uzbekistan; Mukhammadali Mirismanov; Azimjon Sotiboldiev	3:45.58	Moldova; Mihail Culceac; Stanislav Banaru	3:46.17
C–4 500 m	Ukraine; Yaroslav Verbliud; Oleksandr Rudenko; Mykyta Tessa; Vitalii Prystai	1:34.97	Hungary; Gergely Lugosi; Krisztian Szarka; Balasz Szilagyi; David Uhrin	1:35.35	Poland; Kacper Sieradzan; Rafal Poklepa; Piotr Kujawa; Marceli Krawiec	1:37.38

==== Women ====
Event	Gold		Silver		Bronze	
K–1 200 m	Germany; Chelsea-Lynn Roussiekan	40.93	Hungary; Réka Kiskó	41.37	Australia; Natalia Drobot	41.38
K–1 500 m	Italy; Sara del Gratta	1:55.35	Slovakia; Bianka Sidova	1:56.16	Germany; Finja Hermanussen	1:57.02
K–1 1000 m	Slovakia; Bianka Sidova	3:59.44	Hungary; Réka Nemes	4:02.21	Germany; Leni Kliment	4:03.08
K–1 5000 m	Hungary; Réka Nemes	22:54.04	Italy; Sara del Gratta	23:26.37	Argentina; Candela Velazquez	23:27.95
K–2 500 m	Hungary; Janka Rugonfalvi-Kiss; Angelina Szegedi	1:43.70	Slovakia; Reka Bugar; Bianka Sidova	1:43.79	Italy; Sara del Gratta; Giada Rossetti	1:44.23
K–4 500 m	Hungary; Réka Kiskó; Angelina Szegedi; Réka Nemes; Janka Rugonfalvi-Kiss	1:34.47	Germany; Chelsea-Lynn Roussiekan; Jette Brucker; Caroline Heuser; Luca-Marie Westphal	1:36.39	Poland; Zuzanna Błażejczak; Zofia Więcławska; Martyna Jaskólska; Dominika Zimnoch	1:38.97
C–1 200 m	Portugal; Beatriz Fernandes	48.76	Hungary; Ágnes Kiss	49.05	Cuba; Mailienys Avila	49.20
C–1 500 m	China; Li Li	2:05.45	Hungary; Ágnes Kiss	2:05.62	Kazakhstan; Mariya Brovkova	2:08.09
C–1 1000 m	Kazakhstan; Mariya Brovkova	4:35.69	Hungary; Panna Győre	4:37.76	Portugal; Beatriz Fernandes	4:38.66
C–1 5000 m	China; Li Li	26:28.12	Hungary; Borka Zagyvai	27:15.53	Canada; Zoe Wojtyk	27:27.10
C–2 500 m	Hungary; Ágnes Kiss; Csepke Molnár	2:00.30	Germany; Hedi Kliemke; Maike Jakob	2:02.40	Canada; Zoe Wojtyk; Mila Souilliere	2:03.27
C–4 500 m	Germany; Maike Jakob; Hedi Kliemke; Josephine Wichmann; Chantal Tornow	1:53.41	Hungary; Panna Győre; Lili Matkovics; Linett Szeman; Kira Benkucs	1:54.01	Ukraine; Kseniia Romanchuk; Iryna Fedoriv; Khrystyna Osipchuk; Tetiana Smylovenko	1:55.30

==== Mixed ====
Event	Gold		Silver		Bronze	
K–2 500 m	Hungary; Flora Tolgyesi; Balint Kollek	1:36.26	Italy; Sara del Gratta; Achille Spadacini	1:36.45	Australia; Natalia Drobot; Harrison Taurins	1:39.10
C–2 500 m	Ukraine; Yaroslav Verbliud; Iryna Fedoriv	1:52.72	Portugal; Martim Azevedo; Beatriz Fernades	1:52.89	Hungary; Levente Kurucz; Kira Benkucs	1:53.46

=== U23 ===
==== Men ====
Event	Gold		Silver		Bronze	
K–1 500 m	Hungary; Ádam Varga	1:38.36	Australia; Thomas Green	1:38.47	Serbia; Bojan Zdelar	1:39.10
K–1 1000 m	Hungary; Ádam Varga	3:29.31	Australia; Thomas Green	3:30.24	Serbia; Bojan Zdelar	3:31.15
K–1 5000 m	Denmark; Thorbjørn Rask	20:53.35	United Kingdom; Charles Smith	20:54.75	South Africa; Hamish Lovemore	21:05.05
K–2 500 m	Poland; Jakub Stepun; Bartosz Grabowski	1:28.83	Portugal; Gustavo Gonçalves; Pedro Casinha	1:29.15	United States; Jonas Ecker; Aaron Small	1:29.65
K–2 1000 m	Hungary; Bence Vajda; Tamás Szántói Szabó	3:14.95	Sweden; Eric Hedin; Erik Andersson	3:17.51	Italy; Giovanni Penato; Luca Boscolo Meneguolo	3:18.08
K–4 500 m	Poland; Jakub Stepun; Bartosz Grabowski; Przemysław Korsak; Wiktor Leszczyński	1:19.38	Hungary; Levente Kurucz; Zsombor Tamási; Gergely Balogh; Ádám Varga	1:20.52	Australia; Thomas Green; Fletcher Armstrong; Pierre van der Westhuyzen; Noah Havard	1:21.00
C–1 500 m	China; Ji Bowen	1:48.77	Poland; Norman Zezula	1:50.20	Italy; Gabriele Casadei	1:50.88
C–1 1000 m	Hungary; Balázs Adolf	3:50.32	Italy; Gabriele Casadei	3:53.40	Moldova; Mihai Chihaia	3:54.10
C–1 5000 m	Iran; Mohammad Nabi Rezaei	23:30.40	Spain; Noel Domínguez	23:56.15	Hungary; Kristóf Kollár	24:08.86
C–2 500 m	Italy; Gabriele Casadei; Dawid Szela	1:41.33	Spain; Noel Domínguez; Diego Domínguez	1:42.04	China; Miao Feilong; Ji Bowen	1:42.58
C–2 1000 m	Hungary; Balázs Adolf; Dániel Fejes	3:34.88	Ukraine; Artem Chetvertak; Pavlo Borsuk	3:34.95	Spain; Noel Domínguez; Diego Domínguez	3:37.02
C–4 500 m	Spain; Cayetano García; Martin Jacome Couto; Manuel Fontan; David Barreiro	1:32.36	Hungary; Dominik Zombori; David Koczacs; Adam Slihoczi; Kristof Kollar	1:32.65	Poland; Juliusz Kitewski; Adrian Klos; Norman Zezula; Krystian Holdak	1:32.84

==== Women ====
Event	Gold		Silver		Bronze	
K–1 200 m	Hungary; Anna Lucz	40.26	Hungary; Frederikke Matthiesen	41.04	Bulgaria; Yoana Georgieva	41.24
K–1 500 m	Poland; Helena Wiśniewska	1:51.93	Hungary; Eszter Rendessy	1:52.85	Mexico; Beatriz Briones	1:53.35
K–1 1000 m	Hungary; Emese Kőhalmi	3:56.84	Germany; Enja Rosseling	3:58.19	Czech Republic; Anežka Paloudová	3:59.09
K–1 5000 m	Hungary; Emese Kőhalmi	22:47.54	Sweden; Melina Andersson	22:48.88	Czech Republic; Anežka Paloudová	22:56.43
K–2 500 m	Poland; Martyna Klatt; Sandra Ostrowska	1:41.52	Italy; Sara Daldoss; Lucrezia Zironi	1:42.61	Mexico; Isabel Aburto Romero; Beatriz Briones	1:43.70
K–4 500 m	Poland; Martyna Klatt; Sandra Ostrowska; Julia Olszewska; Helena Wiśniewska	1:31.22	Hungary; Sára Fojt; Anna Lucz; Zsóka Csikós; Eszter Rendessy	1:32.91	Italy; Sara Daldoss; Elena Ricchiero; Lucrezia Zironi; Sara Vesentini	1:33.79
C–1 200 m	Spain; Antía Jácome	46.37	China; Shuai Changwen	46.92	Canada; Sophia Jensen	47.06
C–1 500 m	Croatia; Vanesa Tot	2:08.65	China; Wan Yin	2:08.80	Hungary; Laura Gönczöl	2:09.18
C–1 1000 m	China; Zhang Yajue	4:31.22	Canada; Jacy Grant	4:34.92	Hungary; Giada Bragato	4:36.57
C–1 5000 m	Germany; Isabelle Zanin	26:25.93	Poland; Amelia Braun	26:37.43	China; Wan Yin	26:44.63
C–2 500 m	Hungary; Giada Bragato; Bianka Nagy	1:56.28	China; Li Li; Wan Yin	1:56.56	Canada; Sophia Jensen; Julia Lilley Osende	1:56.79
C–4 500 m	Canada; Sophia Jensen; Sloan Mackenzie; Jacy Grant; Julia Lilley Osende	1:50.81	Poland; Angelika Dorozinska; Aleksandra Jacewicz; Katarzyna Szperkiewicz; Julia Walczak	1:52.58	Hungary; Laura Gonczol; Csenge Molnár; Dorina Kulcsar; Fanni Seres	1:53.58

==== Mixed ====
Event	Gold		Silver		Bronze	
K–2 500 m	Poland; Martyna Klatt; Jakub Stepun	1:37.16	Germany; Josefine Landt; Leonard Busch	1:37.35	Hungary; Sara Fojt; Márk Opavszky	1:38.91
C–2 500 m	Spain; Antía Jácome; Diego Domínguez	1:49.59	Canada; Sophia Jensen; Alix Plomteux	1:49.63	Poland; Norman Zezula; Julia Walczak	1:49.68

== Medal table ==
After Day 4

* Host nation (Hungary)

Rank	Nation	Gold	Silver	Bronze	Total
1	Hungary (HUN)*	21	14	6	41
2	Poland (POL)	7	4	4	15
3	Germany (GER)	4	5	5	14
4	Spain (ESP)	4	4	2	10
5	China (CHN)	4	3	2	9
6	Ukraine (UKR)	2	1	2	5
7	Italy (ITA)	1	4	3	8
8	Canada (CAN)	1	3	4	8
9	Croatia (CRO)	1	1	0	2
9	Slovakia (SVK)	1	1	0	2
11	Kazakhstan (KAZ)	1	0	1	2
12	Portugal (POR)	0	2	1	3
13	Australia (AUS)	0	1	3	4
14	Sweden (SWE)	0	1	0	1
14	Uzbekistan (UZB)	0	1	0	1
16	Moldova (MDA)	0	0	3	3
17	Czech Republic (CZE)	0	0	2	2
18	Belgium (BEL)	0	0	1	1
18	Bulgaria (BUL)	0	0	1	1
18	Mexico (MEX)	0	0	1	1
18	Serbia (SRB)	0	0	1	1
18	United States (USA)	0	0	1	1
Totals (22 entries)		47	45	43	135

== See also ==
- ICF World Junior and U23 Canoe Slalom Championships
- ICF Canoe Sprint World Championships
- International Canoe Federation
- Canoe Sprint European Championships
