= 2025 ICF Canoe Sprint World Championships – Men's K-2 500 metres =

Men's K-2 500 metres at the 2025 ICF Canoe Sprint World Championships
- Venue: Idroscalo Regatta Course
- Location: Milan, Italy
- Dates: 21–24 August
- Competitors: 78 from 39 nations
- Winning time: 1:28.28

Medalists
gold medal	Levente Kurucz; Bence Nádas	Hungary
silver medal	João Ribeiro; Messias Baptista	Portugal
bronze medal	Jacob Schopf; Max Lemke	Germany

The men's K-2 500 metres competition at the 2025 ICF Canoe Sprint World Championships in Milan took place in Idroscalo Regatta Course.

== Schedule ==
The schedule is as follows:

Date	Time	Round
Thursday 21 August 2025	11:03	Heats
Saturday 23 August 2025	10:58	Semifinals
Sunday 24 August 2025	09:20	Final C
Sunday 24 August 2025	09:25	Final B
Sunday 24 August 2025	10:54	Final A

== Results ==
=== Heats ===
The fastest five fastest boats (QS) in each heat plus the fastest two remaining boats (qs), advanced to the semi-finals.

==== Heat 1 ====
Rank	Canoeist	Country	Time	Notes
1	Samuele Burgo; Tommaso Freschi	Italy	1:30.15	QS
2	Aleksandr Sergeyev; Viktor Gavrilenko	Individual Neutral Athletes	1:30.41	QS
3	Alex Borucki; Jaroslaw Kajdanek	Poland	1:31.47	QS
4	Johan Myrberg; Karl Brodén	Sweden	1:32.39	QS
5	Erlan Sultangaziev; Rysbek Tolomushev	Kyrgyzstan	1:33.24	QS
6	Vemund Næss Jensen; Harald Ivarsen	Norway	1:33.26	
7	Ooi Brandon Wei Cheng; Alden Ler	Singapore	1:35.57	
8	Edgar Tutyan; Artur Akishin	Armenia	1:53.43	

==== Heat 2 ====
Rank	Canoeist	Country	Time	Notes
1	João Ribeiro; Messias Baptista	Portugal	1:28.10	QS
2	Thomas Green; Pierre van der Westhuyzen	Australia	1:28.30	QS
3	Csaba Zalka; Adam Botek	Slovakia	1:30.51	QS
4	Jakub Špicar; Daniel Havel	Czech Republic	1:30.71	QS
5	Teodor Asenov; Daniel Karakolev	Bulgaria	1:33.70	QS
6	Benjamin Cabrera; Tom Holland	Great Britain	1:35.23	
7	Rimson Mairembam; Tomthilnganba Ngashepam	India	1:40.08	
	Douglas Kiyimba; Ibrahim Lukwago	Uganda	DNS	

==== Heat 3 ====
Rank	Canoeist	Country	Time	Notes
1	Jacob Schopf; Max Lemke	Germany	1:28.66	QS
2	Uladzislau Kravets; Dzmitry Natynchyk	Individual Neutral Athletes	1:29.41	QS
3	Quilian Koch; Francis Mouget	France	1:29.47	QS
4	Enrique Adán; Carlos García Ruiz	Spain	1:29.72	QS
5	Matevž Manfreda; Anze Pikon	Slovenia	1:30.65	QS
6	Aldis Artūrs Vilde; Roberts Akmens	Latvia	1:31.08	qS
7	Nathan Koné; Mathieu Gilbert	Canada	1:32.24	
8	Martín Gorriti; Luis Melo Duarte	Uruguay	1:35.74	

==== Heat 4 ====
Rank	Canoeist	Country	Time	Notes
1	Veljko Vještica; Marko Dragosavljević	Serbia	1:30.34	QS
2	Simon Schuldt-Jensen; Magnus Sibbersen	Denmark	1:31.59	QS
3	Ali Aghamirzaei; Peyman Ghavidel Siah Sofiani	Iran	1:31.88	QS
4	Donat Donhauser; Aaron Schmitter	Switzerland	1:32.03	QS
5	Mizuki Aoki; Haruyuki Tomitsuka	Japan	1:32.07	QS
6	Vasyl Smilka; Valerii Harap	Ukraine	1:32.92	
7	Dmitriy Kholmogorov; Kirill Tubayev	Kazakhstan	1:33.79	
8	Ali Hassan; Hamza Ahmed	Egypt	1:49.09	

==== Heat 5 ====
Rank	Canoeist	Country	Time	Notes
1	Levente Kurucz; Bence Nádas	Hungary	1:28.24	QS
2	Mindaugas Maldonis; Andrejus Olijnikas	Lithuania	1:30.18	QS
3	Jonas Ecker; Aaron Small	United States	1:30.54	QS
4	Jang Sang-won; Kim Hyo-bin	South Korea	1:31.53	QS
5	Lin Yung-chieh; Lin Yong-bo	Chinese Taipei	1:32.30	QS
6	Oleksandr Zarubin; Bekhzod Murodov	Uzbekistan	1:32.92	qS
7	Bu Tingkai; Wang Chi	China	1:33.04	
8	Dede Sunandar; Wandi Wandi	Indonesia	1:35.01	

=== Semifinals ===
The fastest three boats in each semi advanced to the A final. The next three fastest boats in each semi advanced to the final B. The rest boats advanced to the C final

==== Semifinal 1 ====
Rank	Canoeist	Country	Time	Notes
1	Thomas Green; Pierre van der Westhuyzen	Australia	1:29.88	FA
2	Samuele Burgo; Tommaso Freschi	Italy	1:30.01	FA
3	Mindaugas Maldonis; Andrejus Olijnikas	Lithuania	1:30.05	FA
4	Veljko Vještica; Marko Dragosavljević	Serbia	1:30.31	FB
5	Quilian Koch; Francis Mouget	France	1:31.19	FB
6	Hugo Lagerstam; Karl Brodén	Sweden	1:32.53	FB
7	Donat Donhauser; Aaron Schmitter	Switzerland	1:34.01	FC
8	Lin Yung-chieh; Lin Yong-bo	Chinese Taipei	1:35.18	FC
9	Teodor Asenov; Daniel Karakolev	Bulgaria	1:36.43	FC

==== Semifinal 2 ====
Rank	Canoeist	Country	Time	Notes
1	Jacob Schopf; Max Lemke	Germany	1:29.22	FA
2	Aleksandr Sergeyev; Viktor Gavrilenko	Individual Neutral Athletes	1:30.01	FA
3	Enrique Adán; Carlos García Ruiz	Spain	1:30.23	FA
4	Aldis Artūrs Vilde; Roberts Akmens	Latvia	1:30.50	FB
5	Jonas Ecker; Aaron Small	United States	1:30.85	FB
6	Csaba Zalka; Adam Botek	Slovakia	1:31.80	FB
7	Mizuki Aoki; Haruyuki Tomitsuka	Japan	1:32.27	FC
8	Erlan Sultangaziev; Rysbek Tolomushev	Kyrgyzstan	1:32.70	FC
9	Simon Schuldt-Jensen; Magnus Sibbersen	Denmark	1:33.53	FC

==== Semifinal 3 ====
Rank	Canoeist	Country	Time	Notes
1	João Ribeiro; Messias Baptista	Portugal	1:29.28	FA
2	Uladzislau Kravets; Dzmitry Natynchyk	Individual Neutral Athletes	1:29.53	FA
3	Levente Kurucz; Bence Nádas	Hungary	1:29.53	FA
4	Jakub Špicar; Daniel Havel	Czech Republic	1:30.97	FB
5	Matevž Manfreda; Anze Pikon	Slovenia	1:31.83	FB
6	Jang Sang-won; Kim Hyo-bin	South Korea	1:31.84	FB
7	Ali Aghamirzaei; Peyman Ghavidel Siah Sofiani	Iran	1:33.75	FC
8	Oleksandr Zarubin; Bekhzod Murodov	Uzbekistan	1:34.54	FC
	Alex Borucki; Jaroslaw Kajdanek	Poland	DNF	

=== Finals ===
==== Final C ====
Competitors in this final raced for positions 19 to 27.

Rank	Canoeist	Country	Time	Notes
1	Simon Schuldt-Jensen; Magnus Sibbersen	Denmark	1:37.22	
2	Mizuki Aoki; Haruyuki Tomitsuka	Japan	1:38.79	
3	Erlan Sultangaziev; Rysbek Tolomushev	Kyrgyzstan	1:39.59	
4	Oleksandr Zarubin; Bekhzod Murodov	Uzbekistan	1:39.91	
5	Lin Yung-chieh; Lin Yong-bo	Chinese Taipei	1:40.28	
6	Donat Donhauser; Aaron Schmitter	Switzerland	1:41.34	
7	Teodor Asenov; Daniel Karakolev	Bulgaria	1:44.31	
	Ali Aghamirzaei; Peyman Ghavidel Siah Sofiani	Iran	DNS	

==== Final B ====
Competitors in this final raced for positions 10 to 18.

Rank	Canoeist	Country	Time	Notes
1	Veljko Vještica; Marko Dragosavljević	Serbia	1:36.68	
2	Quilian Koch; Francis Mouget	France	1:37.95	
3	Matevž Manfreda; Anze Pikon	Slovenia	1:38.11	
4	Jonas Ecker; Aaron Small	United States	1:38.49	
5	Hugo Lagerstam; Karl Brodén	Sweden	1:39.44	
6	Csaba Zalka; Adam Botek	Slovakia	1:39.46	
7	Aldis Artūrs Vilde; Roberts Akmens	Latvia	1:39.51	
8	Jakub Špicar; Daniel Havel	Czech Republic	1:39.53	
9	Jang Sang-won; Kim Hyo-bin	South Korea	1:40.25	

==== Final A ====
Competitors raced for positions 1 to 9, with medals going to the top three.

Rank	Canoeist	Country	Time	Notes
1st place, gold medalist(s)	Levente Kurucz; Bence Nádas	Hungary	1:28.28	
2nd place, silver medalist(s)	João Ribeiro; Messias Baptista	Portugal	1:28.44	
3rd place, bronze medalist(s)	Jacob Schopf; Max Lemke	Germany	1:28.94	
4	Uladzislau Kravets; Dzmitry Natynchyk	Individual Neutral Athletes	1:29.46	
5	Thomas Green; Pierre van der Westhuyzen	Australia	1:29.58	
6	Mindaugas Maldonis; Andrejus Olijnikas	Lithuania	1:30.50	
7	Samuele Burgo; Tommaso Freschi	Italy	1:30.82	
7	Enrique Adán; Carlos García Ruiz	Spain	1:30.82	
9	Aleksandr Sergeyev; Viktor Gavrilenko	Individual Neutral Athletes	1:31.00	
