= Canoeing at the 2024 Summer Olympics – Men's K-2 500 metres =

Men's K-2 500 metres at the Games of the XXXIII Olympiad
- Venue: National Olympic Nautical Stadium of Île-de-France, Vaires-sur-Marne
- Dates: 6 August 2024 (heats and quarterfinals); 9 August 2024 (semifinals & finals)

Medalists
1st place, gold medalist(s)		Jacob Schopf; Max Lemke	Germany
2nd place, silver medalist(s)		Bence Nádas; Sándor Tótka	Hungary
3rd place, bronze medalist(s)		Jean van der Westhuyzen; Thomas Green	Australia

The men's K-2 500 metres sprint canoeing event at the 2024 Summer Olympics will take place on 6 and 9 August 2024 at the National Olympic Nautical Stadium of Île-de-France in Vaires-sur-Marne.

== Background ==
This will be the 10th appearance of the event after it was introduced at the 1976 Olympics. The last time the event took place was at the 2008 Olympics, after which Men's K-2 1000 metres was introduced.

== Competition format ==
Sprint canoeing uses a four-round format for events with at least 11 boats, with heats, quarterfinals, semifinals, and finals. The specifics of the progression format depend on the number of boats ultimately entered.

The course is a flatwater course 9 metres wide. The name of the event describes the particular format within sprint canoeing. The "K" format means a kayak, with the canoeist sitting, using a double-bladed paddle to paddle, and steering with a foot-operated rudder (as opposed to a canoe, with a kneeling canoeist, single-bladed paddle, and no rudder). The "2" is the number of canoeists in each boat. The "500 metres" is the distance of each race.

== Schedule ==
All times are Central European Summer Time (UTC+2)

The event will be held over two days, with two rounds per day.

Date	Time	Round
6 August 2024	11:30; 14:30	Heats; Quarterfinals
9 August 2024	11:10; 13:20	Semifinals; Finals

== Results ==
=== Heats ===
Progression System: 1st-2nd to SF, rest to QF.

==== Heat 1 ====
Rank	Lane	Canoer	Country	Time	Notes
1	5	Jacob Schopf; Max Lemke	Germany	1:28.03	SF
2	4	João Ribeiro; Messias Baptista	Portugal	1:28.10	SF
3	7	Adrián del Río; Marcus Cooper Walz	Spain	1:35.26	QF
4	6	Bu Tingkai; Zhang Dong	China	1:36.79	QF
5	3	Hamish Legarth; Kurtis Imrie	New Zealand	1:41.18	QF

==== Heat 2 ====
Rank	Lane	Canoer	Country	Time	Notes
1	7	Max Rendschmidt; Tom Liebscher-Lucz	Germany	1:28.39	SF
2	5	Bence Nádas; Sándor Tótka	Hungary	1:29.08	SF
3	3	Oleh Kukharyk; Ihor Trunov	Ukraine	1:31.24	QF
4	4	Mindaugas Maldonis; Andrejus Olijnikas	Lithuania	1:31.27	QF
5	6	Jonas Ecker; Aaron Small	United States	1:32.01	QF

==== Heat 3 ====
Rank	Lane	Canoer	Country	Time	Notes
1	4	Jakub Stepun; Przemysław Korsak	Poland	1:28.84	SF
2	5	Carlos Arévalo; Rodrigo Germade	Spain	1:28.85	SF
3	6	Pierre-Luc Poulin; Simon McTavish	Canada	1:28.91	QF
4	7	Marko Novaković; Marko Dragosavljević	Serbia	1:30.71	QF
5	3	Bekarys Ramatulla; Sergii Tokarnytskyi	Kazakhstan	1:38.62	QF

==== Heat 4 ====
Rank	Lane	Canoer	Country	Time	Notes
1	4	Jean van der Westhuyzen; Thomas Green	Australia	1:28.59	SF
2	7	Bálint Kopasz; Ádám Varga	Hungary	1:29.37	SF
3	5	Jakub Špicar; Daniel Havel	Czech Republic	1:29.73	QF
4	6	Hamish Lovemore; Andrew Birkett	South Africa	1:33.25	QF
5	3	Andjelo Džombeta; Vladimir Torubarov	Serbia	1:34.22	QF

=== Quarter Finals ===
Progression System: 1st-4th to SF, rest eliminated.

==== Quarter Final 1 ====
Rank	Lane	Canoer	Country	Time	Notes
1	5	Adrián del Río; Marcus Cooper Walz	Spain	1:29.12	SF
2	3	Hamish Lovemore; Andrew Birkett	South Africa	1:29.75	SF
3	4	Pierre-Luc Poulin; Simon McTavish	Canada	1:30.01	SF
4	7	Hamish Legarth; Kurtis Imrie	New Zealand	1:30.29	SF
5	6	Mindaugas Maldonis; Andrejus Olijnikas	Lithuania	1:30.30	
6	2	Bekarys Ramatulla; Sergii Tokarnytskyi	Kazakhstan	1:37.58	

==== Quarter Final 2 ====
Rank	Lane	Canoer	Country	Time	Notes
1	4	Jakub Špicar; Daniel Havel	Czech Republic	1:28.36	SF
2	3	Marko Novaković; Marko Dragosavljević	Serbia	1:28.57	SF
3	7	Jonas Ecker; Aaron Small	United States	1:28.93	SF
4	2	Andjelo Džombeta; Vladimir Torubarov	Serbia	1:29.46	SF
5	6	Bu Tingkai; Zhang Dong	China	1:29.58	
6	5	Oleh Kukharyk; Ihor Trunov	Ukraine	1:29.68	

=== Semi Finals ===
Progression System: 1st-4th to Final A, rest to Final B.

==== Semi Final 1 ====
Rank	Lane	Canoer	Country	Time	Notes
1	4	Jacob Schopf; Max Lemke	Germany	1:28.13	FA
2	3	Bence Nádas; Sándor Tótka	Hungary	1:28.38	FA
3	2	Jakub Špicar; Daniel Havel	Czech Republic	1:28.71	FA
4	1	Jonas Ecker; Aaron Small	United States	1:29.51	FA
5	6	Bálint Kopasz; Ádám Varga	Hungary	1:29.66	FB
6	7	Hamish Lovemore; Andrew Birkett	South Africa	1:29.70	FB
7	8	Hamish Legarth; Kurtis Imrie	New Zealand	1:30.26	FB
8	5	Jakub Stepun; Przemysław Korsak	Poland	1:30.95	FB

==== Semi Final 2 ====
Rank	Lane	Canoer	Country	Time	Notes
1	5	Jean van der Westhuyzen; Thomas Green	Australia	1:26.85	OB, FA
2	2	Adrián del Río; Marcus Cooper Walz	Spain	1:27.24	FA
3	3	João Ribeiro; Messias Baptista	Portugal	1:27.64	FA
4	4	Max Rendschmidt; Tom Liebscher-Lucz	Germany	1:27.67	FA
5	6	Carlos Arévalo; Rodrigo Germade	Spain	1:28.49	FB
6	1	Pierre-Luc Poulin; Simon McTavish	Canada	1:29.01	FB
7	7	Marko Novaković; Marko Dragosavljević	Serbia	1:30.20	FB
8	8	Andjelo Džombeta; Vladimir Torubarov	Serbia	1:34.65	FB

=== Finals ===
==== Final A ====
Rank	Lane	Canoer	Country	Time	Notes
1st place, gold medalist(s)	5	Jacob Schopf; Max Lemke	Germany	1:26.87	
2nd place, silver medalist(s)	3	Bence Nádas; Sándor Tótka	Hungary	1:27.15	
3rd place, bronze medalist(s)	4	Jean van der Westhuyzen; Thomas Green	Australia	1:27.29	
4	6	Adrián del Río; Marcus Cooper Walz	Spain	1:27.38	
5	8	Max Rendschmidt; Tom Liebscher-Lucz	Germany	1:27.54	
6	2	João Ribeiro; Messias Baptista	Portugal	1:27.82	
7	7	Jakub Špicar; Daniel Havel	Czech Republic	1:29.29	
8	1	Jonas Ecker; Aaron Small	United States	1:30.02	

==== Final B ====
Rank	Lane	Canoer	Country	Time	Notes
9	4	Carlos Arévalo; Rodrigo Germade	Spain	1:30.08	
10	6	Pierre-Luc Poulin; Simon McTavish	Canada	1:30.80	
11	2	Marko Novaković; Marko Dragosavljević	Serbia	1:31.50	
12	3	Hamish Lovemore; Andrew Birkett	South Africa	1:31.79	
13	1	Jakub Stepun; Przemysław Korsak	Poland	1:32.05	
14	7	Hamish Legarth; Kurtis Imrie	New Zealand	1:32.09	
15	5	Bálint Kopasz; Ádám Varga	Hungary	1:32.85	
16	8	Andjelo Džombeta; Vladimir Torubarov	Serbia	1:35.00	
