= 2026 ICF Canoe Sprint World Championships – Men's K-2 500 metres =

Men's K-2 500 metres at the 2026 ICF Canoe Sprint World Championships
- Venue: Lake Malta
- Location: Poznań, Poland
- Dates: 26–30 August
- Competitors: 80 from 40 nations
- Teams: 40
- Winning time: 1:27.57

Medalists
gold medal	Jacob Schopf; Max Lemke	Germany
silver medal	Joao Ribeiro; Messias Baptista	Portugal
bronze medal	Jakub Spicar; Daniel Havel	Czech Republic

The men's K-2 500 metres competition at the 2026 ICF Canoe Sprint World Championships in Poznań took place at Lake Malta.

== Schedule ==
The schedule is as follows:

Date	Round
Thursday 27 August 2026	Heats
Saturday 29 August 2026	Semifinals
Sunday 30 August 2026	Final B
Sunday 30 August 2026	Final A

== Record ==
The best performance previously in this discipline was:

World Best	Time	Nation	Athletes	Venue
World Best	1:26.50	Hungary	Bence Nadas; Sandor Totka	(Bulgaria) Plovdiv

== Results ==
=== Heats ===
The result of the round of heats was as follows:

Qualification rule: First five boats in each heat (SF) and two fastest boats by time (qBT) advance to semifinal; remainder eliminated.

Heat 1

Rank	Lane	Nation	Athletes	Time	Gap	Notes
1	5	Hungary	Levente Kurucz; Bence Fodor	1:37.72		SF
2	4	Poland	Jaroslaw Kajdanek; Valerii Vichev	1:38.26	0.54	SF
3	7	Sweden	Arvid Soderman; Martin Nathell	1:38.53	0.81	SF
4	6	Spain	Enrique Adan; Carlos Garcia Ruiz	1:39.13	1.41	SF
5	3	Italy	Simone Bernocchi; Tommaso Freschi	1:40.25	2.53	SF
6	2	Kazakhstan	Dmitriy Kholmogorov; Artyom Terechshenko	1:42.89	5.17	
7	8	Mexico	Mauricio Figueroa; Daniel Ledesma Alarcon	1:43.75	6.03	
8	1	Greece	Panagiotis Antoniou; Christos Matsas	1:44.58	6.86	

Heat 2

Rank	Lane	Nation	Athletes	Time	Gap	Notes
1	5	Portugal	Joao Ribeiro; Messias Baptista	1:36.59		SF
2	6	Norway	Gunnar Nydal Eide; Lucas Roesten	1:37.00	0.41	SF
3	4	France	Quilian Koch; Francis Mouget	1:37.81	1.22	SF
4	3	Uruguay	Matias Valentin Otero Ezcurra; Luis Santiago Melo Duarte	1:39.85	3.26	SF
5	1	Brazil	Vagner Junior Souta; Felipe Folador	1:40.22	3.63	SF
6	7	Ukraine	Vasyl Smilka; Oleksandr Zaitsev	1:40.27	3.68	qBT
7	8	Israel	Nevo Kleinman; Aran Benyosef	1:42.35	5.76	
8	2	United States	Cole Jones; Finn Connell	1:45.58	8.99	

Heat 3

Rank	Lane	Nation	Athletes	Time	Gap	Notes
1	5	Germany	Jacob Schopf; Max Lemke	1:35.44		SF
2	3	Neutral Athletes A	Uladzislau Litvinau; Dzmitry Natynchyk	1:36.45	1.01	SF
3	7	Neutral Athletes B	Artem Korovin; Georgii Vaniashov	1:36.87	1.43	SF
4	6	Belgium	Bram Sikkens; Artuur Peters	1:37.71	2.27	SF
5	4	Lithuania	Simonas Maldonis; Andrej Olijnik	1:38.39	2.95	SF
6	8	Uzbekistan	Ziyodbek Yuldashaliev; Samandar Khaydarov	1:41.48	6.04	
7	1	Iraq	Ahmed Sameer Jumaah Faris; Sulaiman Ahmed Saeed Al-Samarraie	1:44.92	9.48	
8	2	Singapore	Brandon Wei Cheng Ooi; Alden Ler	1:45.36	9.92	

Heat 4

Rank	Lane	Nation	Athletes	Time	Gap	Notes
1	5	Slovakia	Samuel Balaz; Adam Botek	1:38.25		SF
2	4	Czech Republic	Jakub Spicar; Daniel Havel	1:39.43	1.18	SF
3	6	Denmark	Simon Schuldt Hein; Morten Graversen	1:39.90	1.65	SF
4	3	China	Fengwei Liang; Weiyang Chen	1:41.40	3.15	SF
5	2	Canada	Mathieu Gilbert; Harris Hunter	1:42.35	4.10	SF
6	7	Bulgaria	Daniel Karakolev; Teodor Asenov	1:42.63	4.38	
7	8	Tunisia	Anas Ben Chaabene; Mohamed Mehdi El Ghali	2:01.84	23.59	
–	1	Indonesia	Dede Sunandar; Wandi Wandi	DNS	-	

Heat 5

Rank	Lane	Nation	Athletes	Time	Gap	Notes
1	3	Australia	Pierre Van Der Westhuyzen; Jean Van Der Westhuyzen	1:37.75		SF
2	4	Serbia	Zarko Jakovljevic; Marko Dragosavljevic	1:38.66	0.91	SF
3	6	Latvia	Aldis Arturs Vilde; Roberts Akmens	1:38.94	1.19	SF
4	5	Slovenia	Matevz Manfreda; Anze Pikon	1:39.43	1.68	SF
5	7	Turkey	Taha Erkam Usta; Muhammet Emin Sulak	1:40.79	3.04	SF
6	2	Switzerland	Fynn Wyss; Aaron Schmitter	1:41.15	3.40	qBT
7	8	Moldova	Lev Lunin; Maxim Rogut	1:43.94	6.19	
8	1	India	Prasanna Kumar Chempadiyil Sathy; Prohit Baroi	1:46.06	8.31	

=== Semifinals ===
The result of the semi finals were as follows:

Qualification rule: First three boats in each semifinal progress to A final (FA); next three boats advance to B final; remained advance to C final

Semifinal 1

Rank	Lane	Nation	Athletes	Time	Gap	Notes
1	1	Slovenia	Matevz Manfreda; Anze Pikon	1:29.52		FA
2	5	Portugal	Joao Ribeiro; Messias Baptista	1:29.73	0.21	FA
3	2	Spain	Enrique Adan; Carlos Garcia Ruiz	1:30.99	1.47	FA
4	4	Australia	Pierre Van Der Westhuyzen; Jean Van Der Westhuyzen	1:31.04	1.52	FB
5	7	Denmark	Simon Schuldt Hein; Morten Graversen	1:31.88	2.36	FB
6	3	Neutral Athletes A	Uladzislau Litvinau; Dzmitry Natynchyk	1:32.73	3.21	FB
7	9	Brazil	Vagner Junior Souta; Felipe Folador	1:33.30	3.78	FC
8	8	China	Fengwei Liang; Weiyang Chen	1:33.92	4.4	FC
-	6	Poland	Jaroslaw Kajdanek; Valerii Vichev	DNF		

Semifinal 2

Rank	Lane	Nation	Athletes	Time	Gap	Notes
1	5	Hungary	Levente Kurucz; Bence Fodor	1:30.83		FA
2	4	Czech Republic	Jakub Spicar; Daniel Havel	1:31.41	0.58	FA
3	2	Italy	Simone Bernocchi; Tommaso Freschi	1:31.79	0.96	FA
4	6	Serbia	Zarko Jakovljevic; Marko Dragosavljevic	1:31.88	1.05	FB
5	3	Neutral Athletes B	Artem Korovin; Georgii Vaniashov	1:31.96	1.13	FB
6	7	Uruguay	Matias Valentin Otero Ezcurra; Luis Santiago Melo Duarte	1:32.74	1.91	FB
7	8	Lithuania	Simonas Maldonis; Andrej Olijnik	1:32.78	1.95	FC
8	9	Switzerland	Fynn Wyss; Aaron Schmitter	1:33.54	2.71	FC
9	1	Turkey	Taha Erkam Usta; Muhammet Emin Sulak	1:34.53	3.7	FC

Semifinal 3

Rank	Lane	Nation	Athletes	Time	Gap	Notes
1	5	Germany	Jacob Schopf; Max Lemke	1:28.66		FA
2	6	Norway	Gunnar Nydal Eide; Lucas Roesten	1:29.69	1.03	FA
3	8	Belgium	Bram Sikkens; Artuur Peters	1:29.90	1.24	FA
4	4	Slovakia	Samuel Balaz; Adam Botek	1:30.08	1.42	FB
5	2	Latvia	Aldis Arturs Vilde; Roberts Akmens	1:30.89	2.23	FB
6	3	Sweden	Arvid Soderman; Martin Nathell	1:31.07	2.41	FB
7	7	France	Quilian Koch; Francis Mouget	1:31.44	2.78	FC
8	1	Canada	Mathieu Gilbert; Harris Hunter	1:33.79	5.13	FC
9	9	Ukraine	Vasyl Smilka; Oleksandr Zaitsev	1:34.39	5.73	FC

=== Finals ===
The result of the final races were as follows:

C final

Rank	Lane	Nation	Athletes	Time	Gap	Notes
1	6	France	Quilian Koch; Francis Mouget	1:32.56		
2	3	China	Fengwei Liang; Weiyang Chen	1:32.77	0.21	
3	4	Lithuania	Simonas Maldonis; Andrej Olijnik	1:33.21	0.65	
4	9	Ukraine	Vasyl Smilka; Oleksandr Zaitsev	1:34.25	1.69	
5	5	Brazil	Vagner Junior Souta; Felipe Folador	1:35.32	2.76	
6	2	Canada	Mathieu Gilbert; Harris Hunter	1:35.55	2.99	
7	7	Switzerland	Fynn Wyss; Aaron Schmitter	1:35.71	3.15	
8	1	Turkey	Taha Erkam Usta; Muhammet Emin Sulak	1:36.92	4.36	

B final

Rank	Lane	Nation	Athletes	Time	Gap	Notes
1	5	Australia	Pierre van der Westhuyzen; Jean van der Westhuyzen	1:31.76		
2	4	Slovakia	Samuel Balaz; Adam Botek	1:32.23	0.47	
3	3	Neutral Athletes A	Artem Korovin; Georgii Vaniashov	1:32.27	0.51	
4	7	Denmark	Simon Schuldt Hein; Morten Graversen	1:32.53	0.77	
5	2	Neutral Athletes B	Uladzislau Litvinau; Dzmitry Natynchyk	1:32.90	1.14	
6	8	Latvia	Aldis Arturs Vilde; Roberts Akmens	1:33.14	1.38	
7	9	Sweden	Arvid Soderman; Martin Nathell	1:33.88	2.12	
8	1	Uruguay	Matias Valentin Otero Ezcurra; Luis Santiago Melo Duarte	1:35.15	3.39	
9	6	Serbia	Zarko Jakovljevic; Marko Dragosavljevic	1:36.00	4.24	

A final

Rank	Lane	Nation	Athletes	Time	Gap	Notes
1st place, gold medalist(s)	6	Germany	Jacob Schopf; Max Lemke	1:27.57		
2nd place, silver medalist(s)	3	Portugal	Joao Ribeiro; Messias Baptista	1:29.29	1.72	
3rd place, bronze medalist(s)	7	Czech Republic	Jakub Spicar; Daniel Havel	1:29.94	2.37	
4	4	Hungary	Levente Kurucz; Bence Fodor	1:30.22	2.65	
5	2	Norway	Gunnar Nydal Eide; Lucas Roesten	1:30.27	2.7	
6	9	Belgium	Bram Sikkens; Artuur Peters	1:30.74	3.17	
7	5	Slovenia	Matevz Manfreda; Anze Pikon	1:31.28	3.71	
8	8	Spain	Enrique Adan; Carlos Garcia Ruiz	1:32.00	4.43	
9	1	Italy	Simone Bernocchi; Tommaso Freschi	1:32.18	4.61	
