= Canoeing at the 2020 Summer Olympics – Men's K-4 500 metres =

Olympic canoeing event

Men's K-4 500 metres at the Games of the XXXII Olympiad
- Canoeing pictogram
- Venue: Sea Forest Waterway
- Dates: 6 August 2021 (heats); 7 August 2021 (semifinal & final)
- Competitors: 44 (11 boats) from 11 nations
- Winning time: 1:22.219

Medalists
1st place, gold medalist(s)		Max Rendschmidt; Ronald Rauhe; Tom Liebscher; Max Lemke	Germany
2nd place, silver medalist(s)		Saúl Craviotto; Marcus Walz; Carlos Arévalo; Rodrigo Germade	Spain
3rd place, bronze medalist(s)		Samuel Baláž; Denis Myšák; Erik Vlček; Adam Botek	Slovakia

The men's K-4 500 metres sprint canoeing event at the 2020 Summer Olympics took place on 6 and 7 August 2021 at the Sea Forest Waterway. 44 canoeists (11 boats of 4) from 11 nations competed.

== Background ==
This was the debut appearance of the event, replacing the 1000 metres men's K-4 race that was held from 1964 to 2016.

The reigning World Champions were Tom Liebscher, Ronald Rauhe, Max Rendschmidt, and Max Lemke of Germany, who were named to the German team. The 2016 Olympic champions in the 1000 metres were Rendschmidt, Liebscher, Max Hoff, and Marcus Gross; Hoff has also been named to the German team.

== Qualification ==
A National Olympic Committee (NOC) could qualify one place in the event. A total of 10 qualification places were available, all awarded through the 2019 ICF Canoe Sprint World Championships. There were required to be boats from 4 continents qualified. Thus, the top 7 at the World Championships were guaranteed to qualify, with the 8th, 9th, and 10th spots potentially being reserved for continental qualifiers.

Qualifying places were awarded to the NOC, not to the individual canoeist who earned the place.

The World Championships places were allocated as follows:

Rank	Kayaker	Nation	Qualification	Selected competitors
1	Tom Liebscher; Ronald Rauhe; Max Rendschmidt; Max Lemke	Germany	Quota #1 (Continent #1)	
2	Saúl Craviotto; Carlos Arévalo; Rodrigo Germade; Marcus Walz	Spain	Quota #2	
3	Erik Vlček; Adam Botek; Csaba Zalka; Samuel Baláž	Slovakia	Quota #3	
4	Aleksandr Sergeyev; Oleg Gusev; Vitaly Ershov; Artem Kuzakhmetov	ROC	Quota #4	
5	Balázs Birkás; Bence Nádas; Sándor Tótka; István Kuli	Hungary	Quota #5	
6	Emanuel Silva; João Ribeiro; David Varela; Messias Baptista	Portugal	Quota #6	
7	Aliaksei Misiuchenka; Stanislau Daineka; Uladzislau Litvinau; Dzmitry Natynchyk	Belarus	Quota #7	
8	Maxime Beaumont; Guillaume Burger; Francis Mouget; Guillaume Le Floch Decorchemont	France	Not qualified	—
9	Daniel Havel; Jakub Špicar; Lukáš Nepraš; Jakub Zavřel	Czech Republic	Not qualified	—
10	Lachlan Tame; Matthew Goble; Thomas Green; Jackson Collins	Australia	Quota #8 (Continent #2)	
11	Nicola Ripamonti; Mauro Pra Floriani; Andrea Di Liberto; Alessandro Gnecchi	Italy	Not qualified	—
12	Momotaro Matsushita; Hiroki Fujishima; Keiji Mizumoto; Yusuke Miyata	Japan	Quota #9 (Continent #3)	
13	Aurimas Lankas; Edvinas Ramanauskas; Mindaugas Maldonis; Simonas Maldonis	Lithuania	Not qualified	—
14	Mark de Jonge; Pierre-Luc Poulin; Nicholas Matveev; Simon McTavish	Canada	Quota #10 (Continent #4)	

== Competition format ==
Sprint canoeing uses a three-round format for events with 10 boats, with heats, semifinals, and finals. The specifics of the progression format depend on the number of boats ultimately entered.

- Heats: 2 heats of 5 boats each. The top 2 in each heat (4 boats total) advance directly to the final. The remaining 6 boats compete in the semifinal.
- Semifinal: 1 heat of 6 boats. The top 4 advance to the final; the remaining 2 boats are eliminated in 9th and 10th place.
- Final: 1 heat of 8 boats. The medals and 4th through 8th place are awarded.

The course is a flatwater course 9 metres wide. The name of the event describes the particular format within sprint canoeing. The "K" format means a kayak, with the canoeist sitting, using a double-bladed paddle to paddle, and steering with a foot-operated rudder (as opposed to a canoe, with a kneeling canoeist, single-bladed paddle, and no rudder). The "4" is the number of canoeists in each boat. The "500 metres" is the distance of each race.

== Schedule ==
The event was held over two consecutive days, with two rounds per day. All sessions started at 9:30 a.m. local time, though there are multiple events with races in each session.

Legend
H	Heats	¼	Quarter-finals	½	Semi-finals	F	Final

Sprint
Event↓/Date →	Mon 2	Tue 3	Wed 4	Thu 5	Fri 6	Sat 7	
Men's K-4 500 m					H	½	F

== Canoer per team ==
Number	Rowers	Nation
1	Lachlan Tame - Riley Fitzsimmons - Murray Stewart - Jordan Wood	Australia
2	Uladzislau Litvinau - Dzmitry Natynchyk - Ilya Fedarenka - Mikita Borykau	Belarus
3	Nicholas Matveev - Mark de Jonge - Pierre-Luc Poulin - Simon McTavish	Canada
4	Yang Xiaoxu - Wang Congkang - Zhang Dong - Bu Tingkai	China
5	Max Rendschmidt - Ronald Rauhe - Tom Liebscher - Max Lemke	Germany
6	Bence Nádas - Kornél Béke - Kolos Csizmadia - Sándor Tótka	Hungary
7	Keiji Mizumoto - Momotaro Matsushita - Yusuke Miyata - Hiroki Fujishima	Japan
8	Emanuel Silva - João Ribeiro - Messias Baptista - David Varela	Portugal
9	Artem Kuzakhmetov - Aleksandr Sergeyev - Roman Anoshkin - Maxim Spesivtsev	ROC
10	Samuel Baláž - Denis Myšák - Erik Vlček - Adam Botek	Slovakia
11	Saúl Craviotto - Marcus Walz - Carlos Arévalo - Rodrigo Germade	Spain

== Results ==
=== Heats ===
Progression System: 1st-2nd to SF, rest to QF.

==== Heat 1 ====
Rank	Lane	Country	Time	Notes
1	5	Germany	1:21.890	SF
2	2	Australia	1:22.662	SF
3	4	Belarus	1:22.896	QF
4	7	China	1:24.264	QF
5	3	Portugal	1:25.515	QF
6	6	Japan	1:32.295	QF

==== Heat 2 ====
Rank	Lane	Country	Time	Notes
1	5	Spain	1:21.658	OB, SF
2	4	Slovakia	1:21.807	SF
3	2	Canada	1:26.824	QF
4	6	ROC	1:30.763	QF
5	3	Hungary	1:34.274	QF

=== Quarterfinal ===
Progression System: 1st-6th to SF, rest out

Rank	Lane	Country	Time	Notes
1	2	Hungary	1:23.727	SF
2	5	Belarus	1:23.848	SF
3	3	China	1:24.036	SF
4	7	Portugal	1:24.325	SF
5	4	Canada	1:24.979	SF
6	6	ROC	1:25.564	SF
7	1	Japan	1:28.211	

=== Semifinals ===
Progression System: 1st-4th to Final, rest out.

==== Semifinal 1 ====
Rank	Lane	Country	Time	Notes
1	5	Germany	1:23.049	FA
2	4	Slovakia	1:23.799	FA
3	3	Belarus	1:24.206	FA
4	2	ROC	1:24.340	FA
5	6	China	1:24.653	

==== Semifinal 2 ====
Rank	Lane	Country	Time	Notes
1	5	Spain	1:24.355	FA
2	4	Australia	1:24.868	FA
3	3	Hungary	1:24.918	FA
4	6	Portugal	1:25.268	FA
5	2	Canada	1:25.581	

=== Final ===
Rank	Lane	Country	Time	Notes
1st place, gold medalist(s)	5	Germany	1:22.219	
2nd place, silver medalist(s)	4	Spain	1:22.445	
3rd place, bronze medalist(s)	3	Slovakia	1:23.534	
4	1	ROC	1:23.654	
5	7	Belarus	1:24.510	
6	6	Australia	1:25.025	
7	2	Hungary	1:25.068	
8	8	Portugal	1:25.324	
