= Gergely Balogh =

Hungarian canoeist (born 2001)

Personal information
- Born: 19 June 2001 (age 25)

Sport
- Country: Hungary
- Sport: Sprint kayak
- Event: K-4 500 m
Medal record
Men's sprint kayak
Representing Hungary
World Championships
Silver medal – second place	2024 Samarkand	K-4 Mix 500 m
Silver medal – second place	2025 Milan	K-4 500 m
European Championships
Bronze medal – third place	2026 Montemor-o-Velho	K-1 200 m

Gergely Balogh (born 19 June 2001) is a Hungarian sprint canoeist.

== Career ==
In June 2024, Balogh at the 2024 ICF Canoe Sprint World Championships and won a silver medal in the mixed K-4 500 metres. In August 2025, he competed at the 2025 ICF Canoe Sprint World Championships and won a silver medal in the K-4 500 metres.
