= Messias Baptista (canoeist) =

Portuguese canoeist (born 1999)

Personal information
- Full name: Messias Filipe Santos Baptista
- Nationality: Portuguese
- Born: 25 June 1999 (age 27) Vila do Conde, Portugal
- Height: 1.89 m (6 ft 2 in)
- Weight: 90 kg (198 lb)

Sport
- Country: Portugal
- Sport: Sprint kayak
- Club: Benfica
Medal record
Men's sprint kayak
Representing Portugal
World Championships
| Gold medal – first place | 2023 Duisburg | K-2 500 m |
| Gold medal – first place | 2024 Samarkand | K-1 200 m |
| Gold medal – first place | 2024 Samarkand | K-2 Mix 500 m |
| Gold medal – first place | 2025 Milan | K-4 500 m |
| Silver medal – second place | 2021 Copenhagen | K-2 Mix 200 m |
| Silver medal – second place | 2025 Milan | K-2 500 m |
| Silver medal – second place | 2026 Poznań | K-2 500 m |
| Bronze medal – third place | 2026 Poznań | K-4 500 m |
European Championships
| Gold medal – first place | 2025 Račice | K-4 500 m |
| Silver medal – second place | 2025 Račice | K-1 200 m |
| Silver medal – second place | 2026 Montemor-o-Velho | K-1 200 m |
European Games
| Gold medal – first place | 2023 Kraków-Małopolska | K-1 200 m |

Messias Filipe Santos Baptista (born 25 June 1999) is a Portuguese sprint canoeist. Together with João Ribeiro, he won the gold medal in the K-2 500 metres event at the 2023 ICF Canoe Sprint World Championships. Baptista also competed in the men's K-4 500 metres event at the 2020 Summer Olympics.

== Major results ==
=== Olympic Games ===
| Year | K-2 500 | K-4 500 |
|---|---|---|
| 2020 | —N/a | 8 |
| 2024 | 6 | —N/a |

=== World championships ===
| Year | K-1 200 | K-2 500 | K-4 500 | XK-2 200 | XK-2 500 | XK-4 500 |
|---|---|---|---|---|---|---|
| 2018 | | | 9 | —N/a | —N/a | —N/a |
| 2019 | | | 6 | —N/a | —N/a | —N/a |
| 2021 | | | 2 FB | 2nd place, silver medalist(s) | —N/a | —N/a |
| 2022 | | 5 | 7 | —N/a | | —N/a |
| 2023 | | 1st place, gold medalist(s) | 7 SF | —N/a | | —N/a |
| 2024 | 1st place, gold medalist(s) | —N/a | —N/a | —N/a | 1st place, gold medalist(s) | DSQ |
| 2025 | | 2nd place, silver medalist(s) | 1st place, gold medalist(s) | —N/a | —N/a | —N/a |
| 2026 | | 2nd place, silver medalist(s) | 3rd place, bronze medalist(s) | —N/a | —N/a | —N/a |
