= Hamish Legarth =

Olympic kayaker (born 1999)

Personal information
- Born: 16 August 1999 (age 27) Hastings, Hawke's Bay, New Zealand
- Height: 185 cm (6 ft 1 in)

Sport
- Country: New Zealand
- Sport: Canoe sprint

Hamish Legarth (born 16 August 1999) is a New Zealand Olympic Kayaker. He competed in the men's K2 500 metres with Kurtis Imrie and the K4 500 metres with Max Brown, Grant Clancy and Kurtis Imrie at the 2024 Summer Olympics.

Born in Hastings, Legarth attended Havelock North High School before studying tertiary education at the University of Waikato.

Legarth studied a Bachelor of Civil Engineering with Honours, graduating in 2025. He won University of Waikato, Sportsman of the Year three times, in 2022, 2023 and 2025.

In 2025, Legarth cycled 4500 km through Africa with fellow Olympic Track Cyclist Nicole Shields, raising funds for World Bicycle Relief.
