= Opavszky =

Opavszky is a Hungarian surname. Notable people with the surname include:

- Márk Opavszky (born 2001), Hungarian canoeist
- Réka Opavszky (born 2003), Hungarian canoeist
