= Canoeing at the 2024 Summer Olympics – Men's K-4 500 metres =

Men's K-4 500 metres at the Games of the XXXIII Olympiad
- Venue: National Olympic Nautical Stadium of Île-de-France, Vaires-sur-Marne
- Dates: 6 August 2024 (heats and quarterfinals); 8 August 2024 (semifinals & finals)

Medalists
1st place, gold medalist(s)		Max Rendschmidt; Jacob Schopf; Tom Liebscher; Max Lemke	Germany
2nd place, silver medalist(s)		Riley Fitzsimmons; Pierre van der Westhuyzen; Jackson Collins; Noah Havard	Australia
3rd place, bronze medalist(s)		Saúl Craviotto; Carlos Arévalo; Marcus Cooper; Rodrigo Germade	Spain

The men's K-4 500 metres sprint canoeing event at the 2024 Summer Olympics took place on 6 and 8 August 2024 at the National Olympic Nautical Stadium of Île-de-France in Vaires-sur-Marne.

== Background ==
This will be the second appearance of the event after it was introduced at the 2020 Olympics.

== Schedule ==
All times are Central European Summer Time (UTC+2)

The event will be held over two days, with two rounds per day.

Date	Time	Round
6 August 2024	9:30; 13:10	Heats; Quarterfinals
8 August 2024	11:50; 13:50	Semifinals; Finals

== Results ==
=== Heats ===
Progression System: 1st-2nd to SF, rest to QF.

==== Heat 1 ====
Rank	Lane	Country	Time	Notes
1	3	Serbia	1:20.99	SF
2	5	Hungary	1:21.18	SF
3	7	Lithuania	1:21.51	QF
4	6	Ukraine	1:21.55	QF
5	2	Canada	1:22.84	QF
6	4	Denmark	1:22.98	QF

==== Heat 2 ====
Rank	Lane	Country	Time	Notes
1	5	Germany	1:20.51	OB, SF
2	4	Spain	1:20.60	SF
3	3	Australia	1:22.28	QF
4	7	New Zealand	1:23.26	QF
5	6	China	1:25.00	QF

=== Quarterfinal ===
Progression System: 1st-6th to SF, rest out

Rank	Lane	Country	Time	Notes
1	2	Australia	1:19.39	OB, SF
2	5	New Zealand	1:20.56	SF
3	3	Denmark	1:20.56	SF
4	7	Canada	1:20.65	SF
5	4	Ukraine	1:20.94	SF
6	6	Lithuania	1:21.09	SF
7	1	China	1:21.31	

=== Semi Finals ===
Progression System: 1st-4th to Final, 5th eliminated.

==== Semi Final 1 ====
Rank	Lane	Country	Time	Notes
1	3	Australia	1:19.22	OB, FA
2	5	Serbia	1:19.91	FA
3	4	Spain	1:19.98	FA
4	2	Ukraine	1:20.67	FA
5	6	Canada	1:20.70	

==== Semi Final 2 ====
Rank	Lane	Country	Time	Notes
1	5	Germany	1:20.57	FA
2	4	Hungary	1:21.07	FA
3	2	Lithuania	1:21.27	FA
4	3	New Zealand	1:21.73	FA
5	6	Denmark	1:21.88	

=== Final ===
Rank	Lane	Country	Time	Notes
1st place, gold medalist(s)	4	Germany	1:19.80	
2nd place, silver medalist(s)	5	Australia	1:19.84	
3rd place, bronze medalist(s)	7	Spain	1:20.05	
4	1	Ukraine	1:21.01	
5	2	Lithuania	1:21.13	
6	3	Serbia	1:21.52	
7	6	Hungary	1:21.99	
8	8	New Zealand	1:22.19	

== Final Ranking ==
Rank	Crew	Nation
1	Max Rendschmidt - Jacob Schopf - Tom Liebscher - Max Lemke	Germany
2	Riley Fitzsimmons - Pierre van der Westhuyzen - Jackson Collins - Noah Havard	Australia
3	Saúl Craviotto - Carlos Arévalo - Marcus Cooper - Rodrigo Germade	Spain
4	Oleh Kukharyk - Dmytro Danylenko - Ihor Trunov - Ivan Semykin	Ukraine
5	Simonas Maldonis - Mindaugas Maldonis - Ignas Navakauskas - Artūras Seja	Lithuania
6	Andjelo Džombeta - Marko Novaković - Marko Dragosavljević - Vladimir Torubarov	Serbia
7	Bence Nádas - Kolos Csizmadia - István Kuli - Sándor Tótka	Hungary
8	Max Brown - Grant Clancy - Kurtis Imrie - Hamish Legarth	New Zealand
9	Nicholas Matveev - Pierre-Luc Poulin - Laurent Lavigne - Simon McTavish	Canada
10	Victor Gairy Aasmul - Lasse Bro Madsen - Morten Gravesen - Magnus Sibbersen	Denmark
11	Bu Tingkai - Wang Congkang - Zhang Dong - Dong Yi	China
