= 2024 ICF Canoe Sprint World Championships – Mixed K-4 500 metres =

Mixed K-5 500 metres at the 2024 ICF Canoe Sprint World Championships
- Venue: Rowing and Canoeing Race Course in Samarkand
- Location: Samarkand, Uzbekistan
- Dates: 24–25 August
- Competitors: 52 from 13 nations
- Winning time: 01:24.907

Medalists
gold medal	Nadzeya Kushner; Volha Khudzenka; Uladzislau Kravets; Dzmitry Natynchyk	Individual Neutral Athletes
silver medal	Laura Ujfalvi; Emese Kőhalmi; Márk Opavszky; Gagely Balogh	Hungary
bronze medal	Mia Medved; Anja Osterman; Anže Urankar; Rok Šmit	Slovenia

The mixed K-4 500 metres competition at the 2024 ICF Canoe Sprint World Championships in Samarkand took place in Rowing and Canoeing Race Course in Samarkand.

== Schedule ==
The schedule is as follows:

Date	Time	Round
Saturday 24 August 2024	10:30	Heats
Saturday 24 August 2024	17:15	Semifinal
Sunday 24 August 2024	14:32	Final A

== Results ==
=== Heats ===
The fastest three boats in each heat advanced directly to the final.
The next four fastest boats in each heat, plus the fastest remaining boat advanced to the semifinal

==== Heat 1 ====
Rank	Canoeist	Country	Time	Notes
DSQ	Teresa Portela; Fernando Pimenta; Messias Baptista; Francisca Laia	Portugal	1:28.125	QF
2	Nadzeya Kushner; Volha Khudzenka; Uladzislau Kravets; Dzmitry Natynchyk	Individual Neutral Athletes	1:29.079	QF
3	Anežka Paloudová; Vilém Kukačka; Jakub Zavřel; Adéla Házová	Czech Republic	1:29.847	QF
4	Martin Nathell; Melina Andersson; Theodor Orban; Julia Lagerstam	Sweden	1:31.485	QS
5	Oleksandr Syromiatnykov; Diana Tanko; Nataliia Dokiienko; Vladyslav Voloshin	Ukraine	1:31.498	QS
6	Shakhrizoda Mavlonova; Samandar Khaydarov; Yaroslav Slavgorodskiy; Madinabonu Islamova	Uzbekistan	1:34.826	QS
7	Pedro Vázquez; Isabel Contreras; Miriam Vega; Íñigo Peña	Spain	1:43.878	QS

==== Heat 2 ====
Rank	Canoeist	Country	Time	Notes
1	Jakub Stepun; Justyna Iskrzycka; Julia Olszewska; Przemysław Korsak	Poland	1:29.218	QF
2	Laura Ujfalvi; Emese Kőhalmi; Márk Opavszky; Gagely Balogh	Hungary	1:29.676	QF
3	Mia Medved; Anja Osterman; Anže Urankar; Rok Šmit	Slovenia	1:30.425	QF
4	Lucas Røsten; Anna Margrete Sletsjøe; Vemund Næss Jensen; Maria Virik	Norway	1:31.643	QS
5	Stella Sukhanova; Kirill Tubayev; Andrey Yerguchyov; Olga Shmelyova	Kazakhstan	1:33.565	QS
6	Jang Sang-won; Jo Shin-young; Lee Han-sol; Lee Kyeong-hun	South Korea	1:33.810	QS

=== Semifinal ===
The fastest three boats advanced to the A final.

Rank	Canoeist	Country	Time	Notes
1	Lucas Røsten; Anna Margrete Sletsjøe; Vemund Næss Jensen; Maria Virik	Norway	1:27.264	QF
2	Pedro Vázquez; Isabel Contreras; Miriam Vega; Íñigo Peña	Spain	1:28.028	QF
3	Martin Nathell; Melina Andersson; Theodor Orban; Julia Lagerstam	Sweden	1:28.851	QF
4	Oleksandr Syromiatnykov; Diana Tanko; Nataliia Dokiienko; Vladyslav Voloshin	Ukraine	1:28.985	
5	Stella Sukhanova; Kirill Tubayev; Andrey Yerguchyov; Olga Shmelyova	Kazakhstan	1:44.034	
6	Shakhrizoda Mavlonova; Samandar Khaydarov; Yaroslav Slavgorodskiy; Madinabonu Islamova	Uzbekistan	1:30.687	
7	Jang Sang-won; Jo Shin-young; Lee Han-sol; Lee Kyeong-hun	South Korea	1:31.091	

=== Final ===
Competitors raced for positions 1 to 9, with medals going to the top three.

Rank	Canoeist	Country	Time
1st place, gold medalist(s)	Nadzeya Kushner; Volha Khudzenka; Uladzislau Kravets; Dzmitry Natynchyk	Individual Neutral Athletes	1:24.907
2nd place, silver medalist(s)	Laura Ujfalvi; Emese Kőhalmi; Márk Opavszky; Gagely Balogh	Hungary	1:25.731
3rd place, bronze medalist(s)	Mia Medved; Anja Osterman; Anže Urankar; Rok Šmit	Slovenia	1:26.980
4	Jakub Stepun; Justyna Iskrzycka; Julia Olszewska; Przemysław Korsak	Poland	1:27.038
5	Lucas Røsten; Anna Margrete Sletsjøe; Vemund Næss Jensen; Maria Virik	Norway	1:27.213
6	Anežka Paloudová; Vilém Kukačka; Jakub Zavřel; Adéla Házová	Czech Republic	1:27.577
7	Pedro Vázquez; Isabel Contreras; Miriam Vega; Íñigo Peña	Spain	1:27.983
8	Martin Nathell; Melina Andersson; Theodor Orban; Julia Lagerstam	Sweden	1:29.545
	Teresa Portela; Fernando Pimenta; Messias Baptista; Francisca Laia	Portugal	DSQ
