= Jacob Schopf =

German sprint canoeist

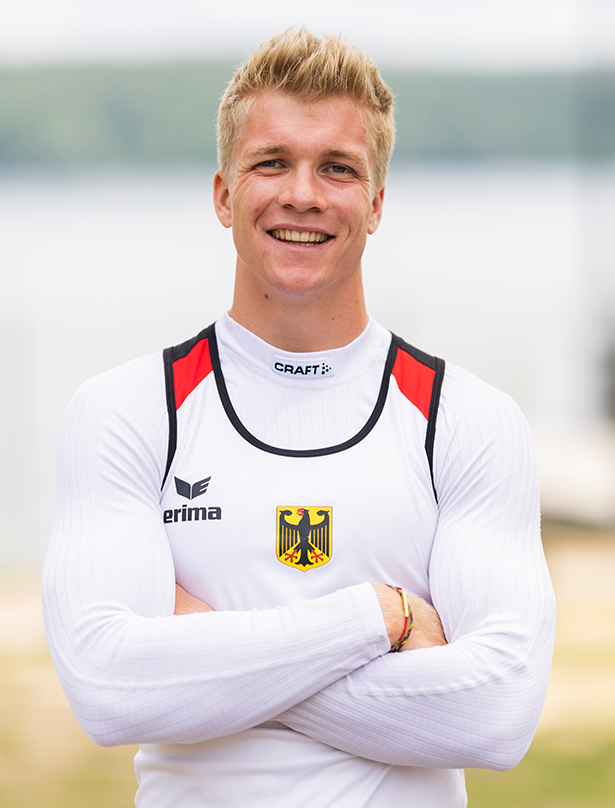
- Schopf in 2021

Personal information
- Nationality: German
- Born: 8 June 1999 (age 27) Berlin, Germany

Sport
- Country: Germany
- Sport: Sprint kayak
- Events: K-2 1000 m, K-4 1000 m
Medal record
Men's canoe sprint
Representing Germany
Olympic Games
Gold medal – first place	2024 Paris	K-4 500 m
Gold medal – first place	2024 Paris	K-2 500 m
Silver medal – second place	2020 Tokyo	K-2 1000 m
World Championships
Gold medal – first place	2018 Montemor-o-Velho	K-4 1000 m
Gold medal – first place	2019 Szeged	K-2 1000 m
Gold medal – first place	2023 Duisburg	K-4 500 m
Gold medal – first place	2023 Duisburg	K-2 Mix 500 m
Gold medal – first place	2026 Poznań	K-2 500 m
Gold medal – first place	2026 Poznań	K-4 500 m
Silver medal – second place	2022 Dartmouth	K-4 500 m
Bronze medal – third place	2022 Dartmouth	K-1 1000 m
Bronze medal – third place	2025 Milan	K-2 500 m
European Championships
Gold medal – first place	2021 Poznań	K-2 1000 m
Gold medal – first place	2022 Munich	K-1 500 m
Gold medal – first place	2022 Munich	K-4 500 m
Gold medal – first place	2026 Montemor-o-Velho	K-2 500 m
Silver medal – second place	2026 Montemor-o-Velho	K-4 500 m
Bronze medal – third place	2021 Poznań	K-2 500 m
Bronze medal – third place	2026 Montemor-o-Velho	K-1 500 m
European Games
Gold medal – first place	2019 Minsk	K-2 1000 m
Bronze medal – third place	2023 Kraków-Małopolska	K-2 Mix 200 m

Jacob Schopf (born 8 June 1999) is a German sprint canoeist.

== Personal life ==
Schopf grew up in Mahlsdorf, a part of the Berlin Marzahn-Hellersdorf district. He has a sister who is three years older than him. In 2018, he graduated from the Flatow Oberschule in Berlin-Köpenick. In same year, he joined Bundeswehr as a sport soldier. Here he currently has the rank of non-commissioned officer. In the end of 2018, he began studying sports and geography at the Humboldt University in Berlin. In 2020, he moved to Potsdam and continued studying in the University of Potsdam.

== Career ==
At the age of eight, Schopf has interested himself in canoe racing, which led him to the Köpenicker Canoe Club (KKC Berlin) in 2007.

His first coach was Philip Krack, who still supports him today. Schopf took part in his first international competition 2015, being qualified as a part of the junior national team at the Junior World Championship in Montemor-o-Velho. Showing his extraordinary talent, he finished in the fourth place at his very first kayak competition.

Schopf achieved his first junior world title a year later, in 2016 Minsk, where he won gold in the kayak single. The following year he defended this title at the Junior World Championships in Piteşti and extended his list of success with another gold in the men's kayak four. After two more years in the junior national team, Schopf qualified directly for the senior team in 2018, skipping the U23 national team. In January 2020, Schopf moved from Berlin to Potsdam where he joined Kanu Club Potsdam. The reasons for the change were the retirement of his coach Eckehardt Sahr and the stronger training group in Potsdam.

At the seniors World Championships in Montemor-o-Velho, 19-year-old Jacob Schopf achieved his first major international success with the men's kayak four. In the following year he also impressed with strong performances and has formed a two-man kayak team with Max Hoff. The so-called generation boat celebrated its first World Championships title at the 2019 World Cup in Szeged. That victory at the World Championships has led Schopf to the nomination for the 2020 Summer Olympics in Tokyo where he will compete in a single kayak and together in a double kayak with Max Hoff.
