= Zsombor Tamási =

Hungarian canoeist (born 2002)

Personal information
- Full name: Zsombor Akos Tamási
- Born: 29 November 2002 (age 23)

Sport
- Country: Hungary
- Sport: Sprint kayak
- Event: K-4 500 m
Medal record
Men's sprint kayak
Representing Hungary
World Championships
Silver medal – second place	2025 Milan	K-4 500 m

Zsombor Akos Tamási (born 29 November 2002) is a Hungarian sprint canoeist.

== Career ==
In August 2025, Tamási competed at the 2025 ICF Canoe Sprint World Championships and won a silver medal in the K-4 500 metres.
