= Hiroki Fujishima =

Japanese canoeist (born 1988)

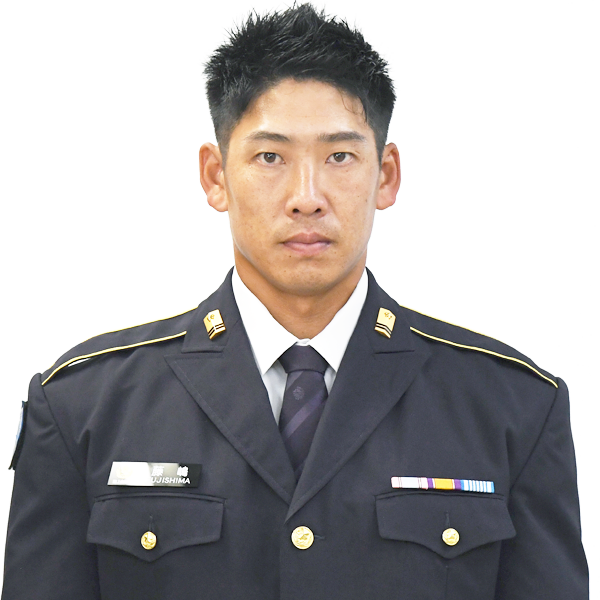

Personal information
- Nationality: Japanese
- Born: 23 May 1988 (age 38)
- Height: 1.78 m (5 ft 10 in)

Sport
- Sport: Canoe sprint
Medal record
Men's canoe sprint
Representing Japan
Asian Championships
Silver medal – second place	2017 Shanghai	K-2 200 m
Silver medal – second place	2017 Shanghai	K-4 500 m
Bronze medal – third place	2015 Palembang	K-2 200 m

Hiroki Fujishima (藤嶋 大規, born 23 May 1988) is a Japanese canoeist. He competed in the men's K-4 500 metres event at the 2020 Summer Olympics.
