= Gustavo Gonçalves =

Portuguese canoeist (born 2003)

Personal information
- Born: 8 August 2003 (age 23)

Sport
- Country: Portugal
- Sport: Sprint kayak
- Event: K–4 500 m
Medal record
Men's sprint kayak
Representing Portugal
World Championships
Gold medal – first place	2025 Milan	K-4 500 m
Bronze medal – third place	2026 Poznań	K-4 500 m
European Championships
Gold medal – first place	2025 Racice	K–4 500 m

Gustavo Gonçalves (born 8 August 2003) is a Portuguese sprint canoeist.

== Career ==
In June 2025, Gonçalves competed at the 2025 Canoe Sprint European Championships and won a gold medal in the K–4 500 metres event. In August 2025, he competed at the 2025 ICF Canoe Sprint World Championships and won a gold medal in the K-4 500 metres with a time of 1:18.93.
