= Max Lemke (canoeist) =

German canoeist (born 1996)

Personal information
- Nationality: German
- Born: 2 December 1996 (age 29) Heppenheim, Germany
- Height: 1.85 m (6 ft 1 in)
- Weight: 90 kg (198 lb)

Sport
- Country: Germany
- Sport: Sprint kayak
- Events: K-2 200 m, K-4 500 m
- Club: KC Potsdam
Medal record
Men's canoe sprint
Representing Germany
Olympic Games
Gold medal – first place	2020 Tokyo	K-4 500 m
Gold medal – first place	2024 Paris	K-4 500 m
Gold medal – first place	2024 Paris	K-2 500 m
World Championships
Gold medal – first place	2017 Račice	K-4 500 m
Gold medal – first place	2018 Montemor-o-Velho	K-4 500 m
Gold medal – first place	2019 Szeged	K-4 500 m
Gold medal – first place	2023 Duisburg	K-4 500 m
Gold medal – first place	2026 Poznań	K-2 500 m
Gold medal – first place	2026 Poznań	K-4 500 m
Silver medal – second place	2022 Dartmouth	K-4 500 m
Bronze medal – third place	2025 Milan	K-2 500 m
European Championships
Gold medal – first place	2021 Poznań	K-4 500 m
Gold medal – first place	2022 Munich	K-4 500 m
Gold medal – first place	2026 Montemor-o-Velho	K-2 500 m
Silver medal – second place	2018 Belgrade	K-4 500 m
Silver medal – second place	2026 Montemor-o-Velho	K-4 500 m
Bronze medal – third place	2017 Plovdiv	K-2 200 m
European Games
Silver medal – second place	2019 Minsk	K-4 500 m

Max Lemke (born 2 December 1996) is a German sprint canoeist.

He participated at the 2018 ICF Canoe Sprint World Championships.
