= 2024 ICF Canoe Sprint World Championships – Men's K-1 200 metres =

Men's K-1 200 metres at the 2024 ICF Canoe Sprint World Championships
- Venue: Rowing and Canoeing Race Course in Samarkand
- Location: Samarkand, Uzbekistan
- Dates: 24–25 August
- Competitors: 29 from 29 nations
- Winning time: 34.876

Medalists
gold medal	Messias Baptista	Portugal
silver medal	Jakub Stepun	Poland
bronze medal	Carlos Garrote	Spain

The men's K-1 200 metres competition at the 2024 ICF Canoe Sprint World Championships in Samarkand took place in Rowing and Canoeing Race Course in Samarkand.

== Schedule ==
The schedule is as follows:

Date	Time	Round
Saturday 24 August 2024	9:10	Heats
Saturday 24 August 2024	16:05	Semifinals
Sunday 25 August 2024	14:50	Final B
Sunday 25 August 2024	14:10	Final A

== Results ==
=== Heats ===
The fastest six fastest boats (QS) in each heat plus the fastest three remaining boats (qs), advanced to the semi-finals.

==== Heat 1 ====
Rank	Canoeist	Country	Time	Notes
1	Badri Kavelashvili	Georgia	35.374	QS
2	Carlos Garrote	Spain	35.655	QS
3	Erlan Sultangaziev	Kyrgyzstan	36.381	QS
4	Oleg Gusev	Germany	36.584	QS
5	Rasmus Brandstrup Knudsen	Denmark	37.321	QS
6	Daniel Roman	Venezuela	38.610	QS
7	Zhang Yueping	China	39.222	qS
8	Abdurasul Haitov	Tajikistan	40.693	

==== Heat 2 ====
Rank	Canoeist	Country	Time	Notes
1	Messias Baptista	Portugal	35.399	QS
2	Jakub Stepun	Poland	35.947	QS
3	Gonzalo Lo Moro	Argentina	36.667	QS
4	Dzmitry Tratsiakou	Individual Neutral Athletes	36.711	QS
5	Ooi Brandon Wei Cheng	Singapore	38.139	QS
6	Mateo Pérez	Colombia	39.175	QS
7	Nathan Humberston	United States	39.432	qS
	Qu Xiangjie	China	DNS	

==== Heat 3 ====
Rank	Canoeist	Country	Time	Notes
1	Maksim Oseledko	Individual Neutral Athletes	35.553	QS
2	Jérémy Leray	France	35.751	QS
3	Balázs Birkás	Hungary	35.844	QS
4	Aldis Artūrs Vilde	Latvia	36.201	QS
5	Thomas MacGibbon	New Zealand	36.489	QS
6	Oleksandr Zaitsev	Ukraine	36.986	QS
7	Akshit Baroi	India	42.668	
	Ahmed Sameer Jumaah Faris	Iraq	DNS	

==== Heat 4 ====
Rank	Canoeist	Country	Time	Notes
1	Anže Urankar	Slovenia	35.741	QS
2	Cho Gwang-hee	South Korea	36.069	QS
3	Martin Sobíšek	Czech Republic	36.498	QS
4	Seiji Komatsu	Japan	36.991	QS
5	Theodor Orban	Sweden	37.860	QS
6	Bekarys Ramatulla	Kazakhstan	37.868	QS
7	Dilmurod Shermurodov	Uzbekistan	37.881	qS

=== Semifinals ===
The fastest three boats in each semi advanced to the A final. The next three fastest boats in each semi advanced to the final B.

==== Semifinal 1 ====
Rank	Canoeist	Country	Time	Notes
1	Badri Kavelashvili	Georgia	35.743	FA
2	Jakub Stepun	Poland	35.769	FA
3	Jérémy Leray	France	35.840	FA
4	Thomas MacGibbon	New Zealand	36.274	FB
5	Martin Sobíšek	Czech Republic	36.717	FB
6	Rasmus Brandstrup Knudsen	Denmark	36.958	FB
7	Seiji Komatsu	Japan	37.071	
8	Dilmurod Shermurodov	Uzbekistan	37.704	
9	Mateo Pérez	Colombia	39.648	

==== Semifinal 2 ====
Rank	Canoeist	Country	Time	Notes
1	Messias Baptista	Portugal	35.865	FA
2	Balázs Birkás	Hungary	36.074	FA
3	Cho Gwang-hee	South Korea	36.128	FA
4	Erlan Sultangaziev	Kyrgyzstan	36.297	FB
5	Aldis Artūrs Vilde	Latvia	36.648	FB
6	Bekarys Ramatulla	Kazakhstan	37.200	FB
7	Oleg Gusev	Germany	37.467	
8	Ooi Brandon Wei Cheng	Singapore	37.809	
9	Zhang Yueping	China	40.220	

==== Semifinal 3 ====
Rank	Canoeist	Country	Time	Notes
1	Carlos Garrote	Spain	35.448	FA
2	Anže Urankar	Slovenia	35.598	FA
3	Oleksandr Zaitsev	Ukraine	35.663	FA
4	Maksim Oseledko	Individual Neutral Athletes	35.783	FB
5	Dzmitry Tratsiakou	Individual Neutral Athletes	35.980	FB
6	Gonzalo Lo Moro	Argentina	36.084	FB
7	Theodor Orban	Sweden	37.741	
8	Nathan Humberston	United States	39.215	
9	Daniel Roman	Venezuela	39.593	

=== Finals ===
==== Final B ====
Competitors in this final raced for positions 10 to 18.

Rank	Canoeist	Country	Time
1	Dzmitry Tratsiakou	Individual Neutral Athletes	35.363
2	Thomas MacGibbon	New Zealand	35.665
2	Maksim Oseledko	Individual Neutral Athletes	35.665
4	Aldis Artūrs Vilde	Latvia	35.848
5	Martin Sobíšek	Czech Republic	36.035
5	Erlan Sultangaziev	Kyrgyzstan	36.035
7	Rasmus Brandstrup Knudsen	Denmark	36.300
8	Gonzalo Lo Moro	Argentina	36.509
9	Bekarys Ramatulla	Kazakhstan	38.030

==== Final A ====
Competitors raced for positions 1 to 9, with medals going to the top three.

Rank	Canoeist	Country	Time
1	Messias Baptista	Portugal	34.876
2	Jakub Stepun	Poland	34.945
3	Carlos Garrote	Spain	35.308
4	Balázs Birkás	Hungary	35.469
5	Anže Urankar	Slovenia	35.562
6	Oleksandr Zaitsev	Ukraine	35.808
7	Jérémy Leray	France	36.030
8	Cho Gwang-hee	South Korea	36.190
9	Badri Kavelashvili	Georgia	36.687
