= S.L. Benfica (canoeing) =

Canoeing team in Lisbon, Portugal

Sport Lisboa e Benfica (Portuguese pronunciation: [sɨˈpɔɾ liʒˈβoɐ i βɐ̃jˈfikɐ]), commonly known as Benfica, is a canoeing team based in Lisbon, Portugal. Benfica's canoeing section is composed of men and women teams. It was created amid the club's "Olympic Project" in 2010, set to develop athletes to represent Portugal at the Summer Olympic Games.

== Technical staff and athletes ==
Name	Nat.	Job
João Coutinho	(Portugal)	Vice President
Carlos Lisboa	(Portugal)	General Manager
Ana Oliveira	(Portugal)	Section Manager

Name	Nat.	Discipline
Fernando Pimenta	(Portugal)	K-1 1000 m, K-1 5000 m, K-2 1000 m, K-4 1000 m
Joana Vasconcelos	(Portugal)	K-1 500 m, K-2 200 m, K-2 500 m, K-4 500 m, K-1 1000 m
João Ribeiro	(Portugal)	K-2 500 m, K-1 200 m, K-4 1000 m
Teresa Portela	(Portugal)	K-1 500 m, K-1 200 m - K-4 500 m

== Honours ==
=== Joana Vasconcelos ===
- Portuguese Women's K1 1000M Sprint Championship:

Winner (1): 2012

=== João Ribeiro ===
- Portuguese Championship Men's K1 1000M in Regatta in Line:

Winner (1): 2012

- Portuguese Championship Men's K1 500M in Regatta in Line:

Winner (1): 2012

- Portuguese Championship Men's K1 200M in Regatta in Line:

Winner (1): 2012

=== Teresa Portela ===
- Portuguese Cup Women's K1 500M in Regatta in Line:

Winner (1): 2012

- Portuguese Cup Women's K1 200M in Regatta in Line:

Winner (1): 2012
