= Bence Fodor =

Hungarian canoeist (born 2002)

Personal information
- Born: 7 October 2002 (age 23)

Sport
- Country: Hungary
- Sport: Sprint kayak
- Event: K-4 500 m
Medal record
Men's sprint kayak
Representing Hungary
World Championships
Silver medal – second place	2025 Milan	K-4 500 m
European Championships
Gold medal – first place	2026 Montemor-o-Velho	K-4 500 m
Silver medal – second place	2026 Montemor-o-Velho	K-2 500 m

Bence Fodor (born 7 October 2002) is a Hungarian sprint canoeist.

== Career ==
In August 2025, Fodor competed at the 2025 ICF Canoe Sprint World Championships and won a silver medal in the K-4 500 metres.
