= Márk Opavszky =

Hungarian canoeist (born 2001)

Personal information
- Born: 10 April 2001 (age 25)

Sport
- Country: Hungary
- Sport: Sprint kayak
- Event(s): K-2 200 m, K-4 500 m
Medal record
Men's sprint kayak
Representing Hungary
World Championships
Silver medal – second place	2024 Samarkand	K-4 Mix 500 m
Silver medal – second place	2025 Milan	K-4 500 m
European Championships
Silver medal – second place	2024 Szeged	K-4 1000 m
Bronze medal – third place	2024 Szeged	K-2 200 m

Márk Opavszky (born 10 April 2001) is a Hungarian sprint canoeist.

== Career ==
In June 2024, Opavszky competed at the 2024 Canoe Sprint European Championships and won a silver medal in the K-4 1000 metres and a bronze medal in the K-2 200 metres event. In August 2024, he competed at the 2024 ICF Canoe Sprint World Championships and won a silver medal in the mixed K-4 500 metres.

In August 2025, he competed at the 2025 ICF Canoe Sprint World Championships and won a silver medal in the K-4 500 metres.
