= 2025 ICF Canoe Sprint World Championships =

Canoe racing event in Milan, Italy

- Venue: Idroscalo Regatta Course
- Location: Milan, Italy
- Dates: 20–24 August

The 2025 ICF Canoe Sprint World Championships were held from 20 to 24 August 2025 in Milan, Italy.

== Canoe sprint ==
=== Medal table ===
* Host nation (Italy)

| Rank | Nation | Gold | Silver | Bronze | Total |
|---|---|---|---|---|---|
| 1 | Hungary | 6 | 2 | 5 | 13 |
| 2 | Ukraine | 4 | 0 | 0 | 4 |
| 3 | Individual Neutral Athletes | 3 | 2 | 4 | 9 |
| 4 | Czech Republic | 2 | 1 | 0 | 3 |
| 5 | Poland | 2 | 0 | 1 | 3 |
| 6 | Spain | 1 | 3 | 4 | 8 |
| 7 | China | 1 | 2 | 1 | 4 |
| 8 | Portugal | 1 | 1 | 1 | 3 |
| 9 | Moldova | 1 | 0 | 1 | 2 |
| 10 | Denmark | 1 | 0 | 0 | 1 |
| 10 | Sweden | 1 | 0 | 0 | 1 |
| 10 | Uzbekistan | 1 | 0 | 0 | 1 |
| 13 | Australia | 0 | 4 | 0 | 4 |
| 14 | Canada | 0 | 3 | 0 | 3 |
| 15 | Italy* | 0 | 2 | 0 | 2 |
| 16 | Cuba | 0 | 1 | 0 | 1 |
| 16 | Greece | 0 | 1 | 0 | 1 |
| 16 | Slovenia | 0 | 1 | 0 | 1 |
| 16 | South Africa | 0 | 1 | 0 | 1 |
| 20 | Germany | 0 | 0 | 2 | 2 |
| 21 | Georgia | 0 | 0 | 1 | 1 |
| 21 | Great Britain | 0 | 0 | 1 | 1 |
| 21 | New Zealand | 0 | 0 | 1 | 1 |
| 21 | Norway | 0 | 0 | 1 | 1 |
| 21 | United States | 0 | 0 | 1 | 1 |
| Totals (25 entries) | | 24 | 24 | 24 | 72 |

Source: Medals Ranking

=== Men ===
==== Canoe ====
| Event | Gold | | Silver | | Bronze | |
|---|---|---|---|---|---|---|
| C–1 200 m | Artur Guliev; Uzbekistan | 38.63 | Pablo Graña; Spain | 38.66 | Sergey Svinarev; Individual Neutral Athletes | 38.82 |
| C–1 500 m | Zakhar Petrov; Individual Neutral Athletes | 1:46.27 | Martin Fuksa; Czech Republic | 1:46.71 | Serghei Tarnovschi; Moldova | 1:47.38 |
| C–1 1000 m | Martin Fuksa; Czech Republic | 3:46.09 | Stefanos Dimopoulos; Greece | 3:47.92 | Balázs Adolf; Hungary | 3:49.40 |
| C–1 5000 m | Serghei Tarnovschi; Moldova | 23:41.31 | Jaime Duro; Spain | 23:43.67 | Wiktor Głazunow; Poland | 23:53.73 |
| C–2 500 m | Zakhar Petrov; Ivan Shtyl; Individual Neutral Athletes | 1:39.63 | Yu Yuebin; Yu Chenwei; China | 1:40.60 | Kristóf Kollár; István Juhász; Hungary | 1:40.74 |
| C–4 500 m | Kristóf Kollár; István Juhász; Jonatán Hajdu; Dániel Fejes; Hungary | 1:30.38 | Daniel Grijalba; Martín Jácome; Manuel Fontán; Adrián Sieiro; Spain | 1:31.15 | Ilya Verashchaka; Stanislau Savelyeu; Uladzislau Paleshko; Danila Verashchaka; Individual Neutral Athletes | 1:31.45 |

==== Kayak ====
| Event | Gold | | Silver | | Bronze | |
|---|---|---|---|---|---|---|
| K–1 200 m | Kolos Csizmadia; Hungary | 34.29 | Andrea Di Liberto; Italy | 34.54 | Badri Kavelashvili; Georgia | 34.64 |
| K–1 500 m | Josef Dostál; Czech Republic | 1:38.43 | Ádám Varga; Hungary | 1:38.52 | Alex Graneri; Spain | 1:39.05 |
| K–1 1000 m | Bálint Kopasz; Hungary | 3:25.50 | Thomas Green; Australia | 3:25.68 | Fernando Pimenta; Portugal | 3:26.16 |
| K–1 5000 m | Mads Pedersen; Denmark | 20:53.89 | Hamish Lovemore; South Africa | 21:13.36 | Ádám Varga; Hungary | 21:24.09 |
| K–2 500 m | Levente Kurucz; Bence Nádas; Hungary | 1:28.28 | João Ribeiro; Messias Baptista; Portugal | 1:28.44 | Jacob Schopf; Max Lemke; Germany | 1:28.94 |
| K–4 500 m | Gustavo Gonçalves; João Ribeiro; Messias Baptista; Pedro Casinha; Portugal | 1:18.93 | Márk Opavszky; Bence Fodor; Gergely Balogh; Zsombor Tamási; Hungary | 1:18.98 | Adrian del Rio; Alex Graneri; Carlos Arévalo; Rodrigo Germade; Spain | 1:19.33 |

=== Women ===
==== Canoe ====
| Event | Gold | | Silver | | Bronze | |
|---|---|---|---|---|---|---|
| C–1 200 m | Liudmyla Luzan; Ukraine | 46.09 | Yarisleidis Cirilo; Cuba | 46.27 | Ekaterina Shliapnikova; Individual Neutral Athletes | 46.59 |
| C–1 500 m | Liudmyla Luzan; Ukraine | 2:01.47 | Katie Vincent; Canada | 2:02.50 | María Corbera; Spain | 2:04.73 |
| C–1 5000 m | Volha Klimava; Individual Neutral Athletes | 26:19.99 | Katie Vincent; Canada | 26:34.92 | Zsófia Csorba; Hungary | 26:48.01 |
| C–2 200 m | Liudmyla Luzan; Iryna Fedoriv; Ukraine | 41.87 | Yuliya Trushkina; Inna Nedelkina; Individual Neutral Athletes | 42.59 | Audrey Harper; Andreea Ghizila; United States | 42.78 |
| C–2 500 m | Liudmyla Luzan; Iryna Fedoriv; Ukraine | 1:53.30 | Zoe Wojtyk; Katie Vincent; Canada | 1:54.36 | Angels Moreno; Viktoriia Yarchevska; Spain | 1:54.84 |
| C–4 500 m | Ágnes Kiss; Bianka Nagy; Réka Opavszky; Zsófia Csorba; Hungary | 1:46.43 | Viktoryia Nestsiarenka; Anhelina Bardanouskaya; Volha Klimava; Lizaveta Prymak; Individual Neutral Athletes | 1:47.48 | Jiang Xina; Teng Anshuo; Sun Mengya; Ma Yanan; China | 1:47.50 |

==== Kayak ====
| Event | Gold | | Silver | | Bronze | |
|---|---|---|---|---|---|---|
| K–1 200 m | Wang Nan; China | 41.46 | Anja Osterman; Slovenia | 41.61 | Emily Lewis; Great Britain | 41.66 |
| K–1 500 m | Anna Puławska; Poland | 1:49.30 | Natalia Drobot; Australia | 1:49.73 | Zsóka Csikós; Hungary | 1:49.84 |
| K–1 1000 m | Zsóka Csikós; Hungary | 3:50.46 | Alyssa Buck; Australia | 3:51.33 | Aimee Fisher; New Zealand | 3:54.11 |
| K–1 5000 m | Melina Andersson; Sweden | 23:10.86 | Susanna Cicali; Italy | 23:54.97 | Anna Margrete Sletsjøe; Norway | 24:17.48 |
| K–2 500 m | Martyna Klatt; Anna Puławska; Poland | 1:41.34 | Kailey Harlen; Natalia Drobot; Australia | 1:41.92 | Paulina Paszek; Pauline Jagsch; Germany | 1:43.19 |
| K–4 500 m | Sara Ouzande; Lucía Val; Estefanía Fernández; Bárbara Pardo; Spain | 1:32.58 | Li Dongyin; Yu Shimeng; Wang Nan; Wang Ji; China | 1:32.68 | Marharyta Tkachova; Uladzislava Skryhanava; Ina Sauchuk; Nadzeya Kushner; Individual Neutral Athletes | 1:32.80 |

== Paracanoe ==
=== Medal table ===
* Host nation (Italy)

| Rank | Nation | Gold | Silver | Bronze | Total |
|---|---|---|---|---|---|
| 1 | Great Britain | 4 | 1 | 3 | 8 |
| 2 | Individual Neutral Athletes | 2 | 0 | 2 | 4 |
| 3 | Brazil | 1 | 3 | 1 | 5 |
| 4 | Hungary | 1 | 1 | 0 | 2 |
| 5 | China | 1 | 0 | 2 | 3 |
| 5 | Germany | 1 | 0 | 2 | 3 |
| 7 | Chile | 1 | 0 | 0 | 1 |
| 7 | Georgia | 1 | 0 | 0 | 1 |
| 9 | Italy* | 0 | 2 | 0 | 2 |
| 10 | Australia | 0 | 1 | 1 | 2 |
| 10 | Uzbekistan | 0 | 1 | 1 | 2 |
| 12 | Canada | 0 | 1 | 0 | 1 |
| 12 | France | 0 | 1 | 0 | 1 |
| 12 | Ukraine | 0 | 1 | 0 | 1 |
| 15 | Japan | 0 | 0 | 1 | 1 |
| Totals (15 entries) | | 12 | 12 | 13 | 37 |

=== Medal events ===
| Event | Gold | | Silver | | Bronze | |
|---|---|---|---|---|---|---|
| Men's KL1 | Péter Pál Kiss; Hungary | 45.96 | Luis Cardoso da Silva; Brazil | 46.93 | Aleksandr Ilichev; Individual Neutral Athletes | 49.63 |
| Men's KL2 | David Phillipson; Great Britain | 44.04 | Christian Volpi; Italy | 44.21 | Oybek Yuldashev; Uzbekistan | 44.22 |
| Men's KL3 | Serhii Yemelianov; Georgia | 40.31 | Miquéias Elias Rodrigues; Brazil | 41.29 | Dylan Littlehales; Australia | 41.33 |
| Men's VL1 | Ilya Taupianets; Individual Neutral Athletes | 58.86 | Benjamin Sainsbury; Australia | 1:01.79 | Artur Chuprov; Individual Neutral Athletes | 58.86 |
| Men's VL2 | Fernando Rufino; Brazil | 51.80 | Igor Alex Tofalini; Brazil | 51.84 | Edward Clifton; Great Britain | 53.04 |
| Men's VL3 | Pu Yi; China | 47.25 | Turabek Nazarkulov; Uzbekistan | 47.28 | Giovane Vieira de Paula; Brazil | 47.50 |
| Women's KL1 | Katherinne Wollermann; Chile | 53.52 | Maryna Mazhula; Ukraine | 54.16 | Xie Maosan; China | 55.06 |
| Women's KL2 | Charlotte Henshaw; Great Britain | 48.07 | Katalin Varga; Hungary | 50.80 | Anja Adler; Germany | 51.94 |
| Women's KL3 | Laura Sugar; Great Britain | 46.15 | Nélia Barbosa; France | 47.26 | Hope Gordon; Great Britain | 51.94 |
| Women's KL3 | Laura Sugar; Great Britain | 46.15 | Nélia Barbosa; France | 47.26 | Felicia Laberer; Germany | 51.94 |
| Women's VL1 | Chinette Karina Lauridsen; Germany | 1:06.99 | Viktoryia Shablova; Italy | 1:12.63 | Monika Seryu; Japan | 1:19.15 |
| Women's VL2 | Anastasia Miasnikova; Individual Neutral Athletes | 1:02.62 | Brianna Hennessy; Canada | 1:04.12 | Jeanette Chippington; Great Britain | 1:04.47 |
| Women's VL3 | Hope Gordon; Great Britain | 55.77 | Charlotte Henshaw; Great Britain | 58.11 | Cai Yuqingyan; China | 58.67 |
