= João Ribeiro (canoeist) =

Portuguese canoeist

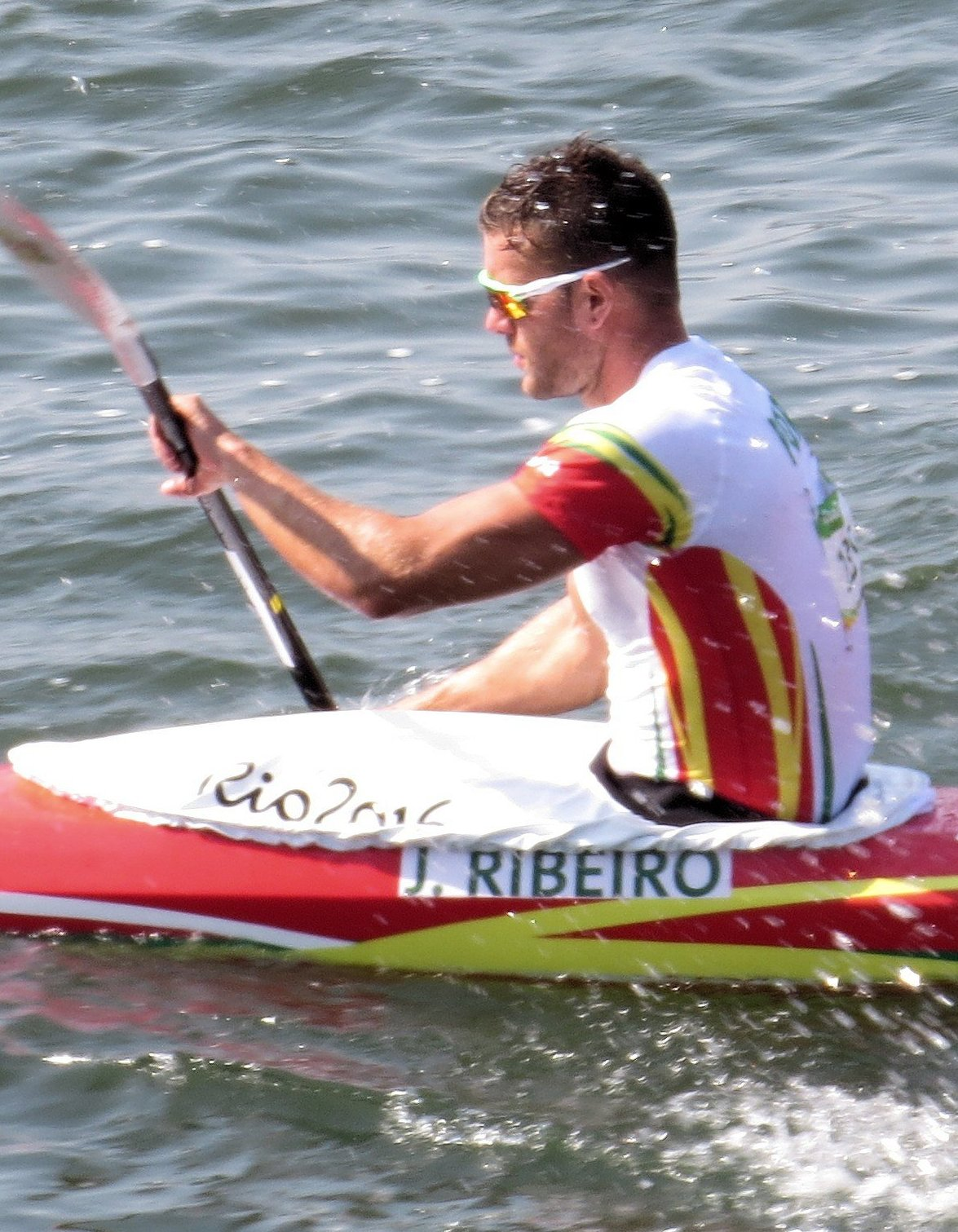
- Ribeiro at the 2016 Summer Olympics

Personal information
- Full name: João Luís Peixoto Ribeiro
- Nationality: Portuguese
- Born: 19 August 1989 (age 37) Esposende, Portugal
- Height: 1.84 m (6 ft 0 in)
- Weight: 92 kg (203 lb)

Sport
- Country: Portugal
- Sport: Sprint kayak
- Club: Benfica
Medal record
Men's sprint kayak
Representing Portugal
World Championships
Gold medal – first place	2013 Duisburg	K-2 500 m
Gold medal – first place	2023 Duisburg	K-2 500 m
Gold medal – first place	2025 Milan	K-4 500 m
Silver medal – second place	2010 Poznań	K-2 500 m
Silver medal – second place	2014 Moscow	K-4 1000 m
Silver medal – second place	2021 Copenhagen	K-1 500 m
Silver medal – second place	2025 Milan	K-2 500 m
Silver medal – second place	2026 Poznań	K-2 500 m
Bronze medal – third place	2026 Poznań	K-4 500 m
European Championships
Gold medal – first place	2011 Belgrade	K-4 1000 m
Gold medal – first place	2014 Brandenburg	K-2 500 m
Gold medal – first place	2025 Racice	K-4 500 m
Silver medal – second place	2013 Montemor-o-Velho	K-4 1000 m
Silver medal – second place	2015 Račice	K-4 1000 m
Silver medal – second place	2021 Poznań	K-1 500 m
Bronze medal – third place	2011 Belgrade	K-2 500 m
Bronze medal – third place	2014 Brandenburg	K-4 1000 m

João Luís Peixoto Ribeiro (born 19 August 1989) is a Portuguese sprint canoeist who has competed since the late 2000s.

== Career ==
He won the gold medal in the K-2 500 metres event at the 2013 and 2023 ICF Canoe Sprint World Championships, both held in Duisburg, Germany, as well as at 2014 Canoe Sprint European Championships. At club level, he competes for Benfica.
