= Choi Min-kyu =

South Korean canoeist

Medal record

Men's sprint canoe

Representing South Korea

Asian Games
Gold medal – first place	2026 Aichi–Nagoya	K-4 500 m
Silver medal – second place	2026 Aichi–Nagoya	Mixed K-2 500 m

Asian Championships
Silver medal – second place	2015 Palembang	K-2 200 m
Silver medal – second place	2025 Nanchang	K-4 500 m
Bronze medal – third place	2011 Tehran	K-2 500 m

Choi Min-kyu (Korean pronunciation: [tɕʰwe̞.min.ɡju]; born August 31, 1992) is a South Korean sprint canoeist. He competed at the 2016 Summer Olympics in the men's K-2 200 metres race with Cho Kwang-hee; the two placed ninth.
