= Levente Kurucz =

Hungarian canoeist (born 2003)

Personal information
- Born: 12 March 2003 (age 23)

Sport
- Country: Hungary
- Sport: Sprint kayak
- Events: K-2 200 m, K-2 500 m
Medal record
Men's sprint kayak
Representing Hungary
World Championships
Gold medal – first place	2025 Milan	K-2 500 m
European Championships
Gold medal – first place	2026 Montemor-o-Velho	K-4 500 m
Silver medal – second place	2026 Montemor-o-Velho	K-2 500 m
Bronze medal – third place	2024 Szeged	K-2 200 m

Levente Kurucz (born 12 March 2003) is a Hungarian sprint canoeist.

== Career ==
In June 2024, Kurucz competed at the 2024 Canoe Sprint European Championships and won a bronze medal in the K-2 200 metres event. In August 2025, he competed at the 2025 ICF Canoe Sprint World Championships and won a gold medal in the K-2 500 metres, along with Bence Nádas.
