= Aleksandr Sergeyev (canoeist) =

Russian canoeist

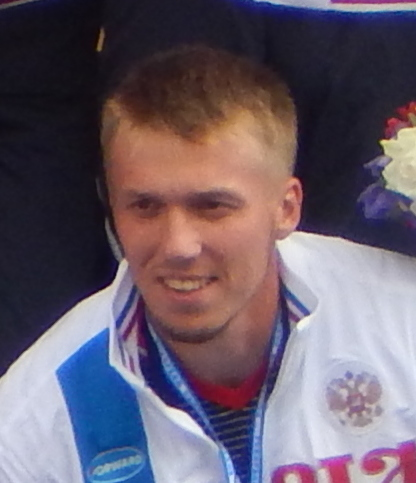
- Sergeyev in 2016

Personal information
- Nationality: Russian
- Born: 27 February 1994 (age 32)

Sport
- Sport: Canoe sprint
Medal record
Men's canoe sprint
Representing Russia
European Games
Gold medal – first place	2019 Minsk	K-4 500 m
Silver medal – second place	2015 Baku	K-4 1000 m
European Championships
Bronze medal – third place	2016 Moscow	K-4 500 m
Bronze medal – third place	2021 Poznań	K-4 500 m

Aleksandr Andeyevich Sergeyev (Russian: Александр Андреевич Сергеев; born 27 February 1994) is a Russian canoeist. He competed in the men's K-4 500 metres event at the 2020 Summer Olympics.
