= Pierre van der Westhuyzen =

South African/Australian canoeist (born 2003)

Personal information
- Full name: Pierre Thomas van der Westhuyzen
- Nationality: South African/Australian
- Born: 18 August 2003 (age 23) Bellville, South Africa
- Home town: Gold Coast, Queensland, Australia

Sport
- Country: Australia
- Sport: Sprint kayak
- Event: K-4 500 m
Medal record
Men's canoe sprint
Representing Australia
Olympic Games
Silver medal – second place	2024 Paris	K-4 500 m
World Championships
Silver medal – second place	2026 Poznań	K-4 500 m

Pierre Thomas van der Westhuyzen (born 18 August 2003) is a South African canoeist. He represented Australia at the 2024 Summer Olympics. He was educated at Michaelhouse, Balgowan, KwaZulu Natal.

== Early life ==
Van der Westhuyzen was born in Bellville, South Africa, and grew up in Cape Town. He and his brother, Jean, began canoeing while attending Michaelhouse in KwaZulu-Natal.

== Career ==
He competed at the 2023 ICF Canoe Sprint World Championships in the K-4 500 metres event and finished in fourth place with a time of 1:19.905. As a result, they qualified for the 2024 Summer Olympics. At the Olympics he competed in the K-4 500 metres event and won a silver medal. Following a photo finish, they missed winning the gold medal by 0.04 seconds.
