= Grant Clancy =

New Zealand canoeist

Personal information
- Born: 15 July 2001 (age 25) San Francisco, California, U.S.
- Home town: Auckland, New Zealand
- Education: St Peter's College, Auckland; The University of Auckland
- Height: 192 cm (6 ft 4 in)

Sport
- Country: New Zealand
- Sport: Canoeing and kayaking
- Events: C2 500 m and K-4 500 m

Grant Clancy (born 15 July 2001) is a New Zealand Olympic canoeist and kayaker specialising in the sprints. He competed in the men's C2 500 metres and K-4 500 metres events at the 2024 Summer Olympics. He was born in San Francisco, California and was educated at St Peter's College. Formerly competing for Piha SLSC he has since moved to race for Red Beach SLSC. After the 2024 Olympics, Clancy returned to his studies as a Bachelor of Commerce student at The University of Auckland.
