= Uladzislau Litvinau =

Belarusian canoeist

Personal information
- Nationality: Belarusian
- Born: 7 January 2000 (age 26)

Sport
- Sport: Canoe sprint
Medal record
Men's canoe sprint
Representing Individual Neutral Athletes
European Championships
Gold medal – first place	2024 Szeged	K-4 500 m
Gold medal – first place	2024 Szeged	K-4 1000 m

Uladzislau Litvinau (Belarusian: Уладзіслаў Літвінаў; born 7 January 2000) is a Belarusian canoeist. He competed in the men's K-4 500 metres event at the 2020 Summer Olympics.
