= Kurtis Imrie =

New Zealand Canoeist

Personal information
- Born: 28 January 1996 (age 30) Lower Hutt, Wellington, New Zealand
- Height: 183 cm (6 ft 0 in)

Sport
- Country: New Zealand
- Sport: Canoe sprint

Kurtis Imrie (born 28 January 1996) is a New Zealand canoeist.

Originally from Wellington, New Zealand, he is the younger brother of women's elite squad paddler, Kayla Imrie. In 2013 he appeared for New Zealand at the Australian Youth Olympic Festival and World Junior Championships, where he finished third in the B Final of the K1 1000m. At the 2014 World Junior Championships, he improved to a fifth-place finish in the K1 1000m A Final. At the 2019 World U23 Championships, Imrie won a K1 500m bronze.

Imrie paddling alongside Max Brown finished eighth in the A Final of the K2 1000m at the World Cup in Poznan in 2021 . Coached by Tim Brabants, Kurtis and Max also qualified a New Zealand K2 1000m boat at the 2020 Oceania Canoe Sprint Championships in Sydney. Imrie finished runner up to Brown in the NZCT New Zealand Canoe Sprint Championships at Lake Karapiro in May 2021 in the K1 1000m. The pair teamed up and were selected to represent New Zealand at the delayed 2020 Summer Games in Tokyo in the K2 1000m where they finished fifth overall.
