= Aaron Small (canoeist) =

American canoeist (born 2001)

Personal information
- Born: July 11, 2001 (age 25) Seattle, Washington, U.S.
- Education: University of Washington

Sport
- Country: United States
- Sport: Sprint kayak
- Events: K-1 1000 m, K-2 500 m
Medal record
Men's canoe sprint
Representing the United States
Pan American Games
Bronze medal – third place	2023 Santiago	K-2 500 m

Aaron Small (born July 11, 2001) is an American sprint kayaker. He represented the United States at the 2024 Summer Olympics.

== Early life ==
Small was diagnosed with bilateral hearing loss at four years old and knows American Sign Language. He started kayaking at 11 years old.

== Career ==
Small partnered with Jonas Ecker in 2022 for K-2 canoeing events. He competed at the 2023 Pan American Games in Santiago, Chile, and won a bronze medal in the K-2 500 meters event. In 2024, he competed at the Canoe Sprint Americas Continental Olympic Qualifier with Ecker and they won in the finals in the K-2 500 meters event, and qualified for the 2024 Summer Olympics in Paris.
