= Jakub Špicar =

Czech sprint canoeist (born 1993)

Personal information
- Nationality: Czech
- Born: 11 June 1993 (age 33) Nymburk, Czech Republic

Sport
- Country: Czech Republic
- Sport: Sprint kayak
- Club: ASC Dukla Praha
Medal record
World Championships
Bronze medal – third place	2021 Copenhagen	K-4 500 m
Bronze medal – third place	2026 Poznań	K-2 500 m
European Championships
Silver medal – second place	2025 Racice	K-2 500 m
Silver medal – second place	2025 Racice	K-4 500 m
Bronze medal – third place	2026 Montemor-o-Velho	K-2 500 m

Jakub Špicar (born 11 June 1993) is a Czech sprint canoeist.

He competed at the 2021 ICF Canoe Sprint World Championships, winning a bronze medal in the K-1 500 m distance.
