= Dzmitry Natynchyk =

Belarusian canoeist

Personal information
- Nationality: Belarusian
- Born: January 21, 1993 (age 33)

Sport
- Country: Belarus
- Sport: Sprint kayak
- Events: K-2 500 m, K-4 500 m
Medal record
Men's canoe sprint
Representing Belarus
World Championships
Gold medal – first place	2019 Szeged	K-2 500 m
European Championships
Gold medal – first place	2021 Poznań	K-2 500 m
Representing ANA
World Championships
Gold medal – first place	2024 Samarkand	K-4 Mix 500 m
Silver medal – second place	2024 Samarkand	K-2 Mix 500 m
European Championships
Gold medal – first place	2024 Szeged	K-4 500 m
Gold medal – first place	2024 Szeged	K-4 1000 m
Silver medal – second place	2024 Szeged	K-2 500 m

Dzmitry Viktarovich Natynchyk (Belarusian: Дзмітрый Віктаровіч Натынчык; born 21 January 1993) is a Belarusian sprint canoeist.

He won a gold medal at the 2019 ICF Canoe Sprint World Championships.

== Major results ==
=== World championships ===
Year	K-1 200	K-1 500	K-2 500	K-4 500	XK-2 500	XK-4 500
2017	8 FC	5			—N/a	—N/a
2018				1 FB	—N/a	—N/a
2019			1st place, gold medalist(s)	7	—N/a	—N/a
2021			1 FB	4	—N/a	—N/a
2024			—N/a	—N/a	2nd place, silver medalist(s)	1st place, gold medalist(s)
