= Sprint kayak =

Water sport

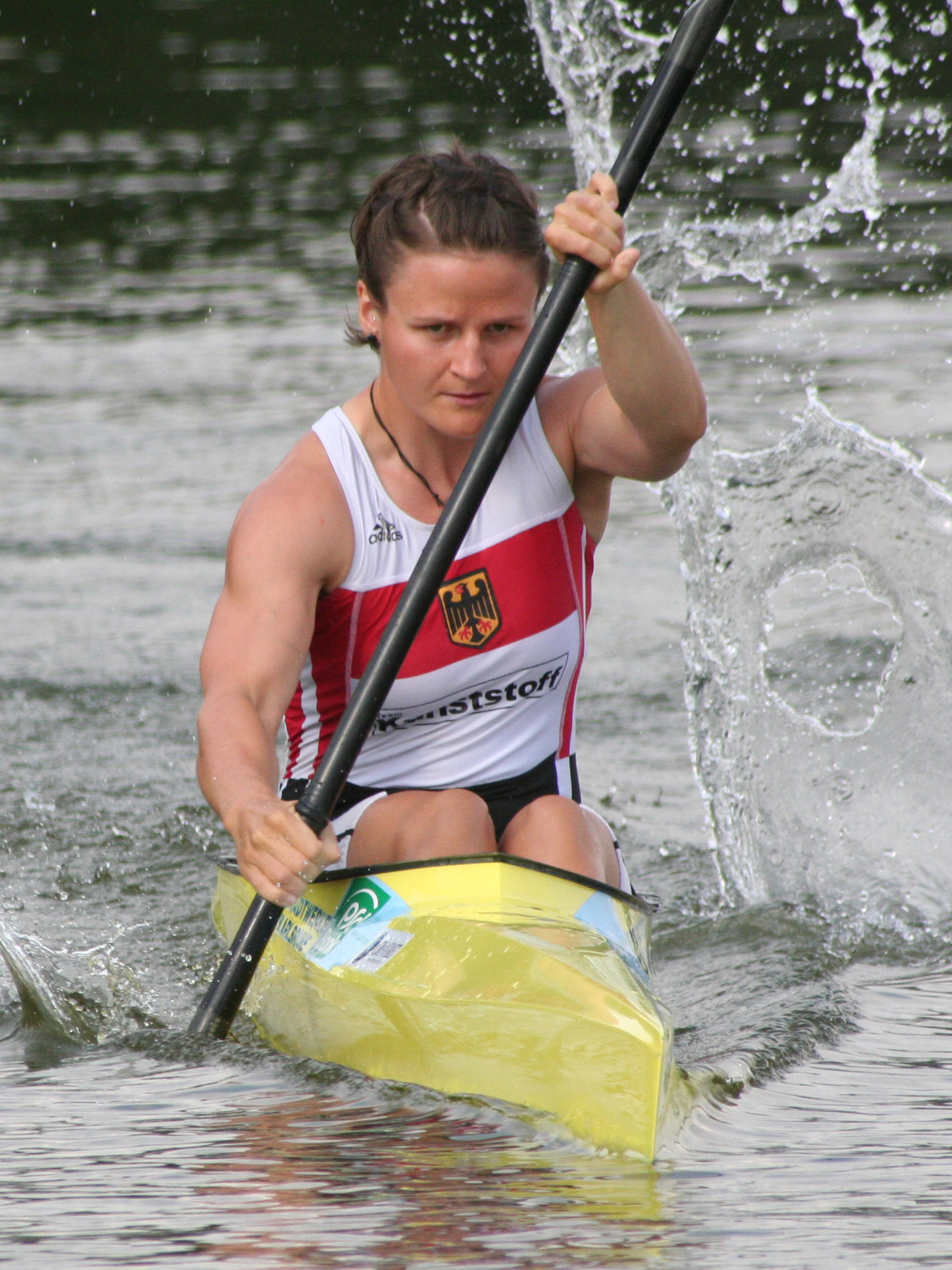
Silke Hörmann in a typically narrow-beamed racing kayak

Sprint kayak is a type of canoe sprint held on calm water. The paddler is seated, facing forward, and uses a double-bladed paddle pulling the blade through the water on alternate sides to propel the boat forward. Kayak sprint has been in every summer Olympics since it debuted at the 1936 Summer Olympics. The sport is governed by Paddle Worldwide.

== History and design ==
Boats may have one rudder which must be under the hull of the boat. The rudder is controlled by the feet of the paddler (the foremost paddler in multi–person designs). The boat to be designed to be a sit-in, as opposed to a sit-on surf ski.

| Boats | K1 | K2 | K4 |
|---|---|---|---|
| Max. length in cm | 520 | 650 | 1100 |
| Min. weight in kg | 12 | 18 | 30 |

Crews or individuals race over 200 m, 500 m, 1000 m, or 5000 m, with the winning boat being the first to cross the finish line.

In competition the number of paddlers within a boat is indicated by a figure beside the type of boat; K1 signifies an individual kayak race, K2 pairs, and K4 four-person crews.

A K-3 kayak has been developed in South Africa for use in the Fish River Canoe Marathon.

Modern sprint kayaks are generally made of lightweight composite materials such as carbon fiber and fiberglass; wood was previously used on older kayaks along with steel for some sections of the boat (i.e. the rudder). They are narrow, extremely unstable, and expensive. Due to this, they are not intended to be used in anything other than flat watercourses - they can capsize and/or be dragged underwater in moderate waves. The beam of a flatwater boat is typically barely wider than the hips of its paddlers and requires the paddler to bend their legs in the boat, allowing for a long and narrow shape to reduce drag.

Canoe sprint kayaks are similar to sprint canoes, with both styles of the boat usually at the same club or with the same team.

Paddles used for sprint boats are made out of carbon fiber and/or fiberglass. The paddle blades are usually offset with respect to each other anywhere from 55 to 85 degrees based on the paddler's preference, although some young paddlers have started to paddle with zero degrees of offset. Commonly referred to as 'feather' or 'pitch', this offset allows the blade of the release hand enter the water squarely (perpendicular the direction of the boat) while the control hand is the top hand. Paddles blades often have a 'tear-drop' shape allowing a powerful catch (where it enters the water) and a lip on the upper cusp so that the paddle may easily exit the water.

== See also ==
- Sprint canoe
- Canoe marathon
- Canoeing at the Summer Olympics
- International Canoe Federation
- ICF Canoe Sprint World Championships
