= 2018 ICF Canoe Sprint World Championships – Men's K-1 1000 metres =

Canoe race in Portugal

Men's K-1 1000 metres at the 2018 ICF Canoe Sprint World Championships
- Venue: Centro de Alto Rendimento de Montemor-o-Velho
- Location: Montemor-o-Velho, Portugal
- Dates: 23–25 August
- Competitors: 33 from 33 nations
- Winning time: 3:27.666

Medalists
gold medal	Fernando Pimenta	Portugal
silver medal	Max Rendschmidt	Germany
bronze medal	Josef Dostál	Czech Republic

The men's K-1 1000 metres competition at the 2018 ICF Canoe Sprint World Championships in Montemor-o-Velho took place at the Centro de Alto Rendimento de Montemor-o-Velho.

== Schedule ==
The schedule was as follows:

Date	Time	Round
Thursday 23 August 2018	12:20	Heats
Saturday 25 August 2018	09:51	Semifinals
Saturday 25 August 2018	11:38	Final B
Saturday 25 August 2018	12:21	Final A

All times are Western European Summer Time (UTC+1)

== Results ==
=== Heats ===
The six fastest boats in each heat, plus the three fastest remaining boats advanced to the semifinals.

==== Heat 1 ====
Rank	Kayaker	Country	Time	Notes
1	Roi Rodríguez	Spain	3:30.809	QS
2	Max Rendschmidt	Germany	3:31.959	QS
3	Thomas Lusty	Great Britain	3:32.370	QS
4	Murray Stewart	Australia	3:33.920	QS
5	Antun Novaković	Croatia	3:34.965	QS
6	Jošt Zakrajšek	Slovenia	3:35.235	QS
7	Quaid Thompson	New Zealand	3:38.455	qS
8	Sebastián Delgado	Uruguay	3:41.385	qS

==== Heat 2 ====
Rank	Kayaker	Country	Time	Notes
1	Fernando Pimenta	Portugal	3:31.419	QS
2	René Holten Poulsen	Denmark	3:33.174	QS
3	Artuur Peters	Belgium	3:33.244	QS
4	Samuele Burgo	Italy	3:37.085	QS
5	Miika Nykänen	Finland	3:37.795	QS
6	Vagner Souta	Brazil	3:38.705	QS
7	Ilya Podpolnyy	Israel	3:39.810	qS
8	Martin Jankovec	Slovakia	3:41.635	

==== Heat 3 ====
Rank	Kayaker	Country	Time	Notes
1	Josef Dostál	Czech Republic	3:31.835	QS
2	Agustín Vernice	Argentina	3:32.690	QS
3	Lars Magne Ullvang	Norway	3:32.860	QS
4	Cyrille Carré	France	3:36.245	QS
5	Dragan Hančovski	Serbia	3:38.995	QS
6	Roman Anoshkin	Russia	3:40.435	QS
7	Bram Brandjes	Netherlands	3:41.460	
8	Vladimir Veljanoski	Macedonia	4:27.553	

==== Heat 4 ====
Rank	Kayaker	Country	Time	Notes
1	Bálint Kopasz	Hungary	3:29.910	QS
2	Bartosz Stabno	Poland	3:30.250	QS
3	Martin Nathell	Sweden	3:35.895	QS
4	Andri Summermatter	Switzerland	3:36.440	QS
5	Miroslav Kirchev	Bulgaria	3:42.986	QS
6	Serhiy Bashtovyy	Ukraine	3:45.231	QS
7	Tom Brennan	Ireland	4:00.802	aS (Note: Tom Brennan was impeded in his heat by malfunctioning starting equipment which failed to release his boat in time)
8	Joaquim Manhique	Mozambique	4:21.943	
9	Ossama Bousserra	Morocco	4:40.349	

=== Semifinals ===
Qualification in each semi was as follows:

The fastest three boats advanced to the A final.
The next three fastest boats advanced to the B final.

==== Semifinal 1 ====
Rank	Kayaker	Country	Time	Notes
1	Fernando Pimenta	Portugal	3:32.986	QA
2	Bálint Kopasz	Hungary	3:33.486	QA
3	Max Rendschmidt	Germany	3:34.016	QA
4	Lars Magne Ullvang	Norway	3:34.941	QB
5	Miroslav Kirchev	Bulgaria	3:36.196	QB
6	Cyrille Carré	France	3:36.541	QB
7	Jošt Zakrajšek	Slovenia	3:37.366	
8	Vagner Souta	Brazil	3:40.221	
9	Quaid Thompson	New Zealand	3:44.256	
10	Tom Brennan	Ireland	3:48.487	

==== Semifinal 2 ====
Rank	Kayaker	Country	Time	Notes
1	Roman Anoshkin	Russia	3:32.462	QA
2	Bartosz Stabno	Poland	3:32.732	QA
3	Josef Dostál	Czech Republic	3:32.852	QA
4	Thomas Lusty	Great Britain	3:33.072	QB
5	Samuele Burgo	Italy	3:33.692	QB
6	Artuur Peters	Belgium	3:33.732	QB
7	Antun Novaković	Croatia	3:36.677	
8	Ilya Podpolnyy	Israel	3:38.303	
9	Andri Summermatter	Switzerland	3:42.123	

==== Semifinal 3 ====
Rank	Kayaker	Country	Time	Notes
1	René Holten Poulsen	Denmark	3:31.908	QA
2	Roi Rodríguez	Spain	3:32.123	QA
3	Murray Stewart	Australia	3:32.343	QA
4	Martin Nathell	Sweden	3:33.068	QB
5	Agustín Vernice	Argentina	3:33.763	QB
6	Dragan Hančovski	Serbia	3:36.833	QB
7	Miika Nykänen	Finland	3:38.033	
8	Serhiy Bashtovyy	Ukraine	3:41.479	
9	Sebastián Delgado	Uruguay	3:42.184	

=== Finals ===
==== Final B ====
Competitors in this final raced for positions 10 to 18.

Rank	Kayaker	Country	Time
1	Thomas Lusty	Great Britain	3:32.943
2	Lars Magne Ullvang	Norway	3:33.113
3	Artuur Peters	Belgium	3:33.243
4	Miroslav Kirchev	Bulgaria	3:33.253
5	Martin Nathell	Sweden	3:34.708
6	Samuele Burgo	Italy	3:36.108
7	Agustín Vernice	Argentina	3:36.708
8	Dragan Hančovski	Serbia	3:40.028
9	Cyrille Carré	France	3:42.534

==== Final A ====
Competitors in this final raced for positions 1 to 9, with medals going to the top three.

Rank	Kayaker	Country	Time
1st place, gold medalist(s)	Fernando Pimenta	Portugal	3:27.666
2nd place, silver medalist(s)	Max Rendschmidt	Germany	3:28.391
3rd place, bronze medalist(s)	Josef Dostál	Czech Republic	3:29.177
4	Bálint Kopasz	Hungary	3:29.917
5	Roi Rodríguez	Spain	3:31.677
6	Bartosz Stabno	Poland	3:32.007
7	Roman Anoshkin	Russia	3:32.602
8	René Holten Poulsen	Denmark	3:32.667
9	Murray Stewart	Australia	3:33.332
