= 2023 ICF Canoe Sprint World Championships – Men's K-1 1000 metres =

Men's K-1 1000 metres at the 2023 ICF Canoe Sprint World Championships
- Venue: Sportpark Duisburg
- Location: Duisburg, Germany
- Dates: 23-26 August
- Competitors: 55 from 55 nations
- Winning time: 3:27.712

Medalists
gold medal	Fernando Pimenta	Portugal
silver medal	Ádám Varga	Hungary
bronze medal	Jakob Thordsen	Germany

The men's K-1 1000 metres competition at the 2023 ICF Canoe Sprint World Championships in Duisburg took place in Sportpark Duisburg.

== Schedule ==
The schedule is as follows:

Date	Time	Round
Wednesday 23 August 2023	18:02	Heats
Thursday 24 August 2023	16:55	Semi-Final A
Thursday 24 August 2023	17:23	Semi-Final B
Saturday 26 August 2023	09:58	Final F
Saturday 26 August 2023	10:05	Final E
Saturday 26 August 2023	10:12	Final D
Saturday 26 August 2023	10:19	Final C
Saturday 26 August 2023	10:26	Final B
Saturday 26 August 2023	12:11	Final A

== Results ==
=== Heats ===
The five fastest boats in each heat and fastest 6th ranked boats advanced to the semi final A. Rest boats advanced to the semi final B.

==== Heat 1 ====
Rank	Canoeist	Country	Time	Notes
1	Ádám Varga	Hungary	3:40.087	QSA
2	Martin Nathell	Sweden	3:43.680	QSA
3	Samuele Burgo	Italy	3:53.648	QSA
4	Matias Otero	Uruguay	3:55.966	QSA
5	Eddy Barranco	Puerto Rico	4:03.957	QSA
6	Ayoub Haidra	Algeria	4:10.151	QSB
7	Nitin Verma	India	4:15.155	QSB
8	Nicholas Robinson	Trinidad and Tobago	4:27.877	QSB

==== Heat 2 ====
Rank	Canoeist	Country	Time	Notes
1	Fernando Pimenta	Portugal	3:40.275	QSA
2	Étienne Hubert	France	3:41.238	QSA
3	Daniel Johnson	Great Britain	3:42.185	QSA
4	Jonas Ecker	United States	3:45.973	QSA
5	Rodion Tuigunov	Kyrgyzstan	3:51.951	QSA
6	Vagner Junior Souta	Brazil	3:58.210	QSB
7	Callam Davis	South Africa	4:02.376	QSB
8	Tuva'a Clifton	Samoa	4:20.982	QSB

==== Heat 3 ====
Rank	Canoeist	Country	Time	Notes
1	Thomas Green	Australia	3:40.084	QSA
2	Rafał Rosolski	Poland	3:41.686	QSA
3	Jošt Zakrajšek	Slovenia	3:44.705	QSA
4	Sulaiman Al-Samarraie	Iraq	3:51.232	QSA
5	Park Ju-hyeon	South Korea	3:58.794	QSA
6	Rafik Saputra	Indonesia	4:13.850	QSB
7	Slehddine Maknine	Tunisia	4:14.508	QSB
	Ray Acuna	Venezuela	DNS	

==== Heat 4 ====
Rank	Canoeist	Country	Time	Notes
1	Jakob Thordsen	Germany	3:37.856	QSA
2	Francisco Cubelos	Spain	3:41.878	QSA
3	Quaid Thompson	New Zealand	3:44.434	QSA
4	Albart Flier	Netherlands	3:51.604	QSA
5	Achraf Elaidi	Morocco	4:09.399	QSA
6	Amado Cruz	Belize	4:11.856	QSB
7	Andre Tutaka-George	Cook Islands	4:21.317	QSB
8	Pita Taufatofua	Tonga	5:15.072	QSB

==== Heat 5 ====
Rank	Canoeist	Country	Time	Notes
1	Agustín Vernice	Argentina	3:40.548	QSA
2	René Holten Poulsen	Denmark	3:44.943	QSA
3	Saeid Fazloula	ICF	3:46.549	QSA
4	Peter Gelle	Slovakia	3:46.647	QSA
5	Andrey Yerguchyov	Kazakhstan	3:48.485	QSA
6	Leocadio Pinto	Colombia	4:01.894	QSB
7	Szevered Sahin	Turkey	4:11.976	QSB
8	Cheung Tsz Chun	Hong Kong	4:19.645	QSB

==== Heat 6 ====
Rank	Canoeist	Country	Time	Notes
1	Artuur Peters	Belgium	3:41.252	QSA
2	Miroslav Kirchev	Bulgaria	3:43.419	QSA
3	Andrej Olijnik	Lithuania	3:44.265	QSA
4	Eetu Kolehmainen	Finland	3:44.985	QSA
5	Vladyslav Voloshin	Ukraine	3:45.310	QSA
6	Cameron Low	Canada	3:50.252	qSA
7	Stefan Kleanthous	Cyprus	3:52.108	QSB
8	Jairo Domingos	Angola	4:25.667	QSB

==== Heat 7 ====
Rank	Canoeist	Country	Time	Notes
1	Josef Dostál	Czech Republic	3:40.429	QSA
2	Timon Maurer	Austria	3:41.063	QSA
3	Branko Lagundžić	Serbia	3:44.896	QSA
4	Jon Amund Vold	Norway	3:46.648	QSA
5	Ilya Podpolnyy	Israel	3:53.194	QSA
6	Aron Faber	Estonia	3:57.695	QSB
7	Joaquim Manhique	Mozambique	4:25.212	QSB
8	Trevor Lespoir	Seychelles	4:58.553	QSB

=== Semifinals ===
==== Semi Final B ====
The fastest three boats in each semi final B advanced to the E final.
The next three fastest boats in each semi final B boats advanced to the F final.

===== Semi Final B 1 =====
Rank	Canoeist	Country	Time	Notes
1	Aron Faber	Estonia	3:48.104	QE
2	Rafik Saputra	Indonesia	3:54.726	QE
3	Nitin Verma	India	3:59.454	QE
4	Andre Tutaka-George	Cook Islands	4:02.582	QF
5	Joaquim Manhique	Mozambique	4:07.988	QF
	Jairo Domingos	Angola	DNS	

===== Semi Final B 2 =====
Rank	Canoeist	Country	Time	Notes
1	Vagner Junior Souta	Brazil	3:43.355	QE
2	Callam Davis	South Africa	3:50.030	QE
3	Szevered Sahin	Turkey	3:54.496	QE
4	Amado Cruz	Belize	3:55.935	QF
5	Nicholas Robinson	Trinidad and Tobago	4:03.899	QF
6	Trevor Lespoir	Seychelles	4:43.147	QF
	Pita Taufatofua	Tonga	DNS	

===== Semi Final B 3 =====
Rank	Canoeist	Country	Time	Notes
1	Stefan Kleanthous	Cyprus	3:43.122	QE
2	Leocadio Pinto	Colombia	3:43.536	QE
3	Ayoub Haidra	Algeria	3:54.970	QE
4	Slehddine Maknine	Tunisia	3:59.634	QF
5	Tuva`a Clifton	Samoa	4:00.820	QF
6	Cheung Tsz Chun	Hong Kong	4:03.328	QF

==== Semi Final A ====
The fastest two boats in each semi final A and fastest 3rd ranked advanced to the A final.
The other 3rd ranked, 4th ranked boats in each semi final and two fastest 5th ranked boats advanced to the B final.
The other 5th ranked, 6th ranked boats in each semi final A and three fastest 7th ranked boats advanced to the C final.
The rest boats advanced to the D final.

===== Semi Final A 1 =====
Rank	Canoeist	Country	Time	Notes
1	Ádám Varga	Hungary	3:25.248	QA
2	Agustín Vernice	Argentina	3:26.730	QA
3	Francisco Cubelos	Spain	3:26.880	qA
4	Timon Maurer	Austria	3:31.337	QB
5	Andrej Olijnik	Lithuania	3:31.691	qB
6	Jonas Ecker	United States	3:36.227	QC
7	Cameron Low	Canada	3:36.465	qC
8	Sulaiman Al-Samarraie	Iraq	3:36.826	QD
9	Eddy Barranco	Puerto Rico	3:51.296	QD

===== Semi Final A 2 =====
Rank	Canoeist	Country	Time	Notes
1	Fernando Pimenta	Portugal	3:28.097	QA
2	Martin Nathell	Sweden	3:28.678	QA
3	René Holten Poulsen	Denmark	3:31.591	QB
4	Branko Lagundžić	Serbia	3:33.255	QB
5	Vladyslav Voloshin	Ukraine	3:33.916	QC
6	Quaid Thompson	New Zealand	3:34.766	QC
7	Eetu Kolehmainen	Finland	3:35.987	qC
8	Jošt Zakrajšek	Slovenia	3:36.358	QD
9	Rodion Tuigunov	Kyrgyzstan	3:44.886	QD

===== Semi Final A 3 =====
Rank	Canoeist	Country	Time	Notes
1	Thomas Green	Australia	3:27.307	QA
2	Artuur Peters	Belgium	3:28.620	QA
3	Samuele Burgo	Italy	3:30.001	QB
4	Daniel Johnson	Great Britain	3:30.569	QB
5	Rafał Rosolski	Poland	3:31.351	qB
6	Peter Gelle	Slovakia	3:36.355	QC
7	Ilya Podpolnyy	Israel	3:36.990	qC
8	Albart Flier	Netherlands	3:38.158	QD
9	Andrey Yerguchyov	Kazakhstan	3:41.167	QD

===== Semi Final A 4 =====
Rank	Canoeist	Country	Time	Notes
1	Jakob Thordsen	Germany	3:27.398	QA
2	Josef Dostál	Czech Republic	3:29.454	QA
3	Miroslav Kirchev	Bulgaria	3:30.653	QB
4	Étienne Hubert	France	3:33.101	QB
5	Saeid Fazloula	ICF	3:33.486	QC
6	Jon Amund Vold	Norway	3:35.148	QC
7	Matias Otero	Uruguay	3:39.651	QD
8	Park Ju-hyeon	South Korea	3:45.602	QD
9	Achraf Elaidi	Morocco	4:03.317	QD

=== Finals ===
==== Final F ====
Competitors in this final raced for positions 46 to 53.

Rank	Canoeist	Country	Time	Notes
1	Slehddine Maknine	Tunisia	3:55.232	
2	Amado Cruz	Belize	3:55.785	
3	Tuva`a Clifton	Samoa	3:57.768	
4	Cheung Tsz Chun	Hong Kong	3:59.063	
5	Andre Tutaka-George	Cook Islands	3:59.565	
6	Nicholas Robinson	Trinidad and Tobago	4:04.316	
7	Joaquim Manhique	Mozambique	4:11.868	
8	Trevor Lespoir	Seychelles	4:37.403	

==== Final E ====
Competitors in this final raced for positions 37 to 45.

Rank	Canoeist	Country	Time	Notes
1	Stefan Kleanthous	Cyprus	3:41.021	
2	Vagner Junior Souta	Brazil	3:43.176	
3	Aron Faber	Estonia	3:44.378	
4	Leocadio Pinto	Colombia	3:47.077	
5	Callam Davis	South Africa	3:51.556	
6	Ayoub Haidra	Algeria	3:54.312	
7	Nitin Verma	India	3:54.478	
8	Rafik Saputra	Indonesia	3:56.462	
9	Szevered Sahin	Turkey	4:18.911	

==== Final D ====
Competitors in this final raced for positions 28 to 36.

Rank	Canoeist	Country	Time	Notes
1	Jošt Zakrajšek	Slovenia	3:36.676	
2	Andrey Yerguchyov	Kazakhstan	3:36.717	
3	Albart Flier	Netherlands	3:39.619	
4	Sulaiman Al-Samarraie	Iraq	3:41.133	
5	Park Ju-hyeon	South Korea	3:44.116	
6	Rodion Tuigunov	Kyrgyzstan	3:45.424	
7	Matias Otero	Uruguay	3:47.858	
8	Achraf Elaidi	Morocco	3:52.579	
9	Eddy Barranco	Puerto Rico	3:54.608	

==== Final C ====
Competitors in this final raced for positions 19 to 27.

Rank	Canoeist	Country	Time	Notes
1	Quaid Thompson	New Zealand	3:36.052	
2	Jon Amund Vold	Norway	3:37.181	
3	Cameron Low	Canada	3:38.626	
4	Vladyslav Voloshin	Ukraine	3:38.822	
5	Jonas Ecker	United States	3:38.884	
6	Saeid Fazloula	ICF	3:39.721	
7	Ilya Podpolnyy	Israel	3:42.483	
8	Peter Gelle	Slovakia	3:58.242	
9	Eetu Kolehmainen	Finland	3:59.804	

==== Final B ====
Competitors in this final raced for positions 9 to 18.

Rank	Canoeist	Country	Time	Notes
1	René Holten Poulsen	Denmark	3:31.868	
2	Samuele Burgo	Italy	3:32.274	
3	Étienne Hubert	France	3:32.601	
4	Timon Maurer	Austria	3:33.174	
5	Daniel Johnson	Great Britain	3:33.517	
6	Miroslav Kirchev	Bulgaria	3:35.465	
7	Rafał Rosolski	Poland	3:35.611	
8	Branko Lagundžić	Serbia	3:36.229	
9	Andrej Olijnik	Lithuania	3:36.316	

==== Final A ====
Competitors in this final raced for positions 1 to 9.

Rank	Canoeist	Country	Time	Notes
1st place, gold medalist(s)	Fernando Pimenta	Portugal	3:27.712	
2nd place, silver medalist(s)	Ádám Varga	Hungary	3:28.141	
3rd place, bronze medalist(s)	Jakob Thordsen	Germany	3:28.303	
4	Thomas Green	Australia	3:29.572	
5	Josef Dostál	Czech Republic	3:30.022	
6	Artuur Peters	Belgium	3:31.244	
7	Francisco Cubelos	Spain	3:31.993	
8	Martin Nathell	Sweden	3:32.204	
9	Agustín Vernice	Argentina	3:37.811	
