= 2017 ICF Canoe Sprint World Championships – Men's K-1 1000 metres =

Men's K-1 1000 metres at the 2017 ICF Canoe Sprint World Championships
- Venue: Sportcentrum Račice
- Location: Račice, Czech Republic
- Dates: 24–26 August
- Competitors: 40 from 40 nations
- Winning time: 3:27.754

Medalists
gold medal	Tom Liebscher	Germany
silver medal	Fernando Pimenta	Portugal
bronze medal	Josef Dostál	Czech Republic

The men's K-1 1000 metres competition at the 2017 ICF Canoe Sprint World Championships in Račice took place at the Sportcentrum Račice.

== Schedule ==
The schedule was as follows:

Date	Time	Round
Thursday 24 August 2017	09:28	Heats
Thursday 24 August 2017	16:10	Semifinals
Saturday 26 August 2017	09:25	Final C
Saturday 26 August 2017	09:32	Final B
Saturday 26 August 2017	11:01	Final A

All times are Central European Summer Time (UTC+2)

== Results ==
=== Heats ===
The seven fastest boats in each heat, plus the fastest remaining boat advanced to the semifinals.

==== Heat 1 ====
Rank	Kayaker	Country	Time	Notes
1	René Holten Poulsen	Denmark	3:35.427	QS
2	Artuur Peters	Belgium	3:35.905	QS
3	Étienne Hubert	France	3:36.072	QS
4	Roi Rodriguez	Spain	3:37.399	QS
5	Farzin Asadi	Iran	3:41.366	QS
6	Alexandr Yemelyanov	Kazakhstan	3:45.877	QS
7	Matti Stern	Israel	3:50.033	QS
8	Park Juhyeon	South Korea	3:50.533	qS
9	Teo Guang Yi Lucas	Singapore	3:55.238	

==== Heat 2 ====
Rank	Kayaker	Country	Time	Notes
1	Josef Dostál	Czech Republic	3:34.704	QS
2	Agustin Vernice	Argentina	3:36.520	QS
3	Jošt Zakrajšek	Slovenia	3:37.715	QS
4	Antun Novaković	Croatia	3:38.637	QS
5	Vagner Souta	Brazil	3:39.437	QS
6	Roman Anoshkin	Russia	3:39.526	QS
7	Dragan Hančovski	Serbia	3:42.431	QS
8	He Long	China	4:01.565	
9	Maksim Serditov	Kyrgyzstan	4:01.909	

==== Heat 3 ====
Rank	Kayaker	Country	Time	Notes
1	Fernando Pimenta	Portugal	3:39.250	QS
2	Jo Sondre Solhaug	Norway	3:40.533	QS
3	Gábor Jakubik	Slovakia	3:43.133	QS
4	Christoph Kornfeind	Austria	3:46.383	QS
5	Tarmo Tootsi	Estonia	3:46.506	QS
6	Darko Savić	Bosnia and Herzegovina	3:49.150	QS
7	Tuan Yen-Yu	Chinese Taipei	3:53.983	QS

==== Heat 4 ====
Rank	Kayaker	Country	Time	Notes
1	Tom Liebscher	Germany	3:37.254	QS
2	Miroslav Kirchev	Bulgaria	3:40.415	QS
3	Martin Nathell	Sweden	3:40.604	QS
4	Magnus Gregory	Great Britain	3:40.698	QS
5	Aldis Arturs Vilde	Latvia	3:41.243	QS
6	Sean Rice	South Africa	3:44.415	QS
7	Mohamed Mrabet	Tunisia	3:53.198	QS
8	Albert Raj Selvaraj	India	3:53.626	

==== Heat 5 ====
Rank	Kayaker	Country	Time	Notes
1	Aleh Yurenia	Belarus	3:36.003	QS
2	Bálint Kopasz	Hungary	3:37.853	QS
3	Murray Stewart	Australia	3:40.514	QS
4	Andri Summermatter	Switzerland	3:42.692	QS
5	Martin Brzeziński	Poland	3:43.442	QS
6	Yasuhiro Suzuki	Japan	3:52.598	QS
7	Marton Apor Urban	United States	4:04.931	QS

=== Semifinals ===
Qualification was as follows:

All first and second-place boats, plus the fastest third-place boat advanced to the A final.
All other third-place boats, all fourth-place boats and the two fastest fifth-place boats advanced to the B final.
All other fifth-place boats, all sixth-place boats and the three fastest remaining boats advanced to the C final.

==== Semifinal 1 ====
Rank	Kayaker	Country	Time	Notes
1	Aleh Yurenia	Belarus	3:33.273	QA
2	René Holten Poulsen	Denmark	3:33.812	QA
3	Miroslav Kirchev	Bulgaria	3:34.212	qA
4	Farzin Asadi	Iran	3:37.801	QB
5	Antun Novaković	Croatia	3:39.684	qB
6	Dragan Hančovski	Serbia	3:42.618	QC
7	Darko Savić	Bosnia and Herzegovina	3:46.456	qC
8	Magnus Gregory	Great Britain	3:47.579	
9	Marton Apor Urban	United States	4:08.912	

==== Semifinal 2 ====
Rank	Kayaker	Country	Time	Notes
1	Josef Dostál	Czech Republic	3:33.755	QA
2	Bálint Kopasz	Hungary	3:34.427	QA
3	Artuur Peters	Belgium	3:34.850	QB
4	Vagner Souta	Brazil	3:37.988	QB
5	Martin Nathell	Sweden	3:40.783	qB
6	Christoph Kornfeind	Austria	3:45.327	QC
7	Yasuhiro Suzuki	Japan	3:47.383	
8	Tuan Yen-Yu	Chinese Taipei	3:53.155	
9	Mohamed Mrabet	Tunisia	3:55.511	

==== Semifinal 3 ====
Rank	Kayaker	Country	Time	Notes
1	Fernando Pimenta	Portugal	3:35.918	QA
2	Agustin Vernice	Argentina	3:36.679	QA
3	Martin Brzeziński	Poland	3:39.529	QB
4	Étienne Hubert	France	3:39.546	QB
5	Gábor Jakubik	Slovakia	3:41.596	QC
6	Andri Summermatter	Switzerland	3:44.018	QC
7	Sean Rice	South Africa	3:44.735	qC
8	Matti Stern	Israel	4:00.313	
9	Roman Anoshkin	Russia	4:35.885	

==== Semifinal 4 ====
Rank	Kayaker	Country	Time	Notes
1	Tom Liebscher	Germany	3:34.843	QA
2	Roi Rodriguez	Spain	3:37.065	QA
3	Murray Stewart	Australia	3:37.759	QB
4	Jo Sondre Solhaug	Norway	3:40.548	QB
5	Aldis Arturs Vilde	Latvia	3:40.865	QC
6	Jošt Zakrajšek	Slovenia	3:42.759	QC
7	Tarmo Tootsi	Estonia	3:44.554	qC
8	Alexandr Yemelyanov	Kazakhstan	3:47.843	
9	Park Juhyeon	South Korea	4:02.604	

=== Finals ===
==== Final C ====
Competitors in this final raced for positions 19 to 27.

Rank	Kayaker	Country	Time
1	Jošt Zakrajšek	Slovenia	3:38.792
2	Gábor Jakubik	Slovakia	3:39.976
3	Dragan Hančovski	Serbia	3:40.376
4	Aldis Arturs Vilde	Latvia	3:41.009
5	Christoph Kornfeind	Austria	3:41.559
6	Andri Summermatter	Switzerland	3:42.170
7	Sean Rice	South Africa	3:44.098
8	Tarmo Tootsi	Estonia	3:47.526
9	Darko Savić	Bosnia and Herzegovina	3:51.515

==== Final B ====
Competitors in this final raced for positions 10 to 18.

Rank	Kayaker	Country	Time
1	Murray Stewart	Australia	3:32.583
2	Artuur Peters	Belgium	3:35.033
3	Étienne Hubert	France	3:35.522
4	Martin Brzeziński	Poland	3:36.195
5	Martin Nathell	Sweden	3:37.350
6	Jo Sondre Solhaug	Norway	3:37.372
7	Vagner Souta	Brazil	3:37.595
8	Antun Novaković	Croatia	3:39.500
9	Farzin Asadi	Iran	3:40.956

==== Final A ====
Competitors in this final raced for positions 1 to 9, with medals going to the top three.

Rank	Kayaker	Country	Time
1st place, gold medalist(s)	Tom Liebscher	Germany	3:27.754
2nd place, silver medalist(s)	Fernando Pimenta	Portugal	3:27.993
3rd place, bronze medalist(s)	Josef Dostál	Czech Republic	3:28.576
4	Aleh Yurenia	Belarus	3:29.593
5	Bálint Kopasz	Hungary	3:29.809
6	Miroslav Kirchev	Bulgaria	3:30.915
7	Agustin Vernice	Argentina	3:31.037
8	René Holten Poulsen	Denmark	3:32.732
9	Roi Rodriguez	Spain	3:33.115
