= 2022 ICF Canoe Sprint World Championships – Men's K-1 1000 metres =

Men's K-1 1000 metres at the 2022 ICF Canoe Sprint World Championships
- Venue: Lake Banook
- Location: Dartmouth, Canada
- Dates: 3–6 August
- Competitors: 30 from 30 nations
- Winning time: 3:38.93

Medalists
gold medal	Bálint Kopasz	Hungary
silver medal	Fernando Pimenta	Portugal
bronze medal	Jacob Schopf	Germany

The men's K-1 1000 metres competition at the 2022 ICF Canoe Sprint World Championships in Dartmouth took place on Lake Banook.

== Schedule ==
The schedule is as follows:

Date	Time	Round
Wednesday 3 August 2022	16:15	Heats
Friday 5 August 2022	12:50	Semifinals
Saturday 6 August 2022	12:55	Final A
Saturday 6 August 2022	15:10	Final B

== Results ==
=== Heats ===
The six fastest boats in each heat, plus the three fastest seventh-place boats advanced to the semifinals.

==== Heat 1 ====
Rank	Canoeist	Country	Time	Notes
1	Fernando Pimenta	Portugal	3:42.03	QS
2	Josef Dostál	Czech Republic	3:42.47	QS
3	Andrejus Olijnikas	Lithuania	3:47.72	QS
4	Jošt Zakrajšek	Slovenia	3:48.68	QS
5	Eetu Kolehmainen	Finland	3:57.68	QS
6	Guang Teo	Singapore	3:57.80	QS
7	Amado Cruz	Belize	4:08.62	qS
	Daniel Ledesma	Mexico	DNF	

==== Heat 2 ====
Rank	Canoeist	Country	Time	Notes
1	Thomas Green	Australia	3:43.91	QS
2	Jacob Schopf	Germany	3:44.19	QS
3	Darius Zaharia	Romania	3:52.65	QS
4	Peter Gelle	Slovakia	3:52.71	QS
5	Samuele Burgo	Italy	3:52.87	QS
6	Brian Malfesi	Canada	3:52.89	QS
7	Eddy Barranco	Puerto Rico	4:17.91	qS

==== Heat 3 ====
Rank	Canoeist	Country	Time	Notes
1	Bálint Kopasz	Hungary	3:41.26	QS
2	Artuur Peters	Belgium	3:42.29	QS
3	Francisco Cubelos	Spain	3:42.34	QS
4	Daniel Johnson	Great Britain	3:45.51	QS
5	Jonas Ecker	United States	3:50.46	QS
6	James Munro	New Zealand	3:53.06	QS
7	Mark Keeling	South Africa	3:54.20	qS
8	Ilya Podpolnyy	Israel	3:56.64	
9	Nicolas Robinson	Trinidad and Tobago	4:35.63	

==== Heat 4 ====
Rank	Canoeist	Country	Time	Notes
1	Agustín Vernice	Argentina	3:49.40	QS
2	Zhang Dong	China	3:49.50	QS
3	Martin Nathell	Sweden	3:49.58	QS
4	René Poulsen	Denmark	3:54.85	QS
5	Albart Flier	Netherlands	3:55.26	QS
6	Saeid Fazloula	ICF	3:55.75	QS

=== Semifinals ===
Qualification in each semi was as follows:

The fastest three boats advanced to the A final.
The next three fastest boats advanced to the B final.

==== Semifinal 1 ====
Rank	Canoeist	Country	Time	Notes
1	Fernando Pimenta	Portugal	3:39.49	QA
2	Jacob Schopf	Germany	3:40.48	QA
3	Artuur Peters	Belgium	3:41.49	QA
4	René Poulsen	Denmark	3:44.24	QB
5	Martin Nathell	Sweden	3:44.83	QB
6	Jonas Ecker	United States	3:48.66	QB
7	Brian Malfesi	Canada	3:52.66	
8	Mark Keeling	Uruguay	3:52.91	
9	Eetu Kolehmainen	Finland	4:01.51	

==== Semifinal 2 ====
Rank	Canoeist	Country	Time	Notes
1	Thomas Green	Australia	3:43.50	QA
2	Zhang Dong	China	3:44.06	QA
3	Francisco Cubelos	Spain	3:45.05	QA
4	Samuele Burgo	Italy	3:45.17	QB
5	Daniel Johnson	Great Britain	3:45.57	QB
6	Andrejus Olijnikas	Lithuania	3:48.49	QB
7	Jošt Zakrajšek	Slovenia	3:49.61	
8	Saeid Fazloula	ICF	3:56.03	
9	Amado Cruz	Belize	4:09.99	

==== Semifinal 3 ====
Rank	Canoeist	Country	Time	Notes
1	Josef Dostál	Czech Republic	3:40.82	QA
2	Bálint Kopasz	Hungary	3:43.08	QA
3	Agustín Vernice	Argentina	3:44.60	QA
4	Peter Gelle	Slovakia	3:50.12	QB
5	James Munro	New Zealand	3:51.39	QB
6	Albart Flier	Netherlands	3:54.65	QB
7	Guang Teo	Singapore	3:58.52	
8	Darius Zaharia	Romania	3:59.03	
9	Eddy Barranco	Puerto Rico	4:23.41	

=== Finals ===
==== Final B ====
Competitors in this final raced for positions 10 to 18.

Rank	Canoeist	Country	Time
1	Martin Nathell	Sweden	3:54.15
2	René Poulsen	Denmark	3:54.82
3	Daniel Johnson	Great Britain	3:55.07
4	Andrejus Olijnikas	Lithuania	3:56.65
5	Jonas Ecker	United States	3:59.06
6	Samuele Burgo	Italy	3:59.98
7	Peter Gelle	Slovakia	4:01.35
8	Albart Flier	Netherlands	4:06.02
9	James Munro	New Zealand	4:15.88

==== Final A ====
Competitors in this final raced for positions 1 to 9, with medals going to the top three.

Rank	Canoeist	Country	Time
1st place, gold medalist(s)	Bálint Kopasz	Hungary	3:38.93
2nd place, silver medalist(s)	Fernando Pimenta	Portugal	3:38.98
3rd place, bronze medalist(s)	Jacob Schopf	Germany	3:40.27
4	Thomas Green	Australia	3:41.49
5	Josef Dostál	Czech Republic	3:41.53
6	Artuur Peters	Belgium	3:41.84
7	Agustín Vernice	Argentina	3:42.04
8	Francisco Cubelos	Spain	3:44.93
9	Zhang Dong	China	3:45.25
