= Canoeing at the 2024 Summer Olympics – Men's K-1 1000 metres =

Men's K-1 1000 metres at the Games of the XXXIII Olympiad
- Venue: National Olympic Nautical Stadium of Île-de-France, Vaires-sur-Marne
- Dates: 7 August 2024 (heats and quarterfinals); 10 August 2024 (semifinals & finals)
- Competitors: 29 from 24 nations
- Winning time: 3:24.07

Medalists
1st place, gold medalist(s)		Josef Dostál	Czech Republic
2nd place, silver medalist(s)		Ádám Varga	Hungary
3rd place, bronze medalist(s)		Bálint Kopasz	Hungary

The men's K-1 1000 metres sprint canoeing event at the 2024 Summer Olympics took place on 7 and 10 August 2024 at the National Olympic Nautical Stadium of Île-de-France in Vaires-sur-Marne.

Josef Dostál won the gold, Ádám Varga took the silver medal, and the defending 2020 Olympic champion Bálint Kopasz took the bronze medal.

== Background ==
This was the 21st appearance of the event after it was introduced at the 1936 Olympics.

== Competition format ==
Sprint canoeing uses a four-round format for events with at least 11 boats, with heats, quarterfinals, semifinals, and finals. The specifics of the progression format depend on the number of boats ultimately entered.

The course is a flatwater course 9 metres wide. The name of the event describes the particular format within sprint canoeing. The "K" format means a kayak, with the canoeist sitting, using a double-bladed paddle to paddle, and steering with a foot-operated rudder (as opposed to a canoe, with a kneeling canoeist, single-bladed paddle, and no rudder). The "1" is the number of canoeists in each boat. The "1000 metres" is the distance of each race.

== Schedule ==
All times are Central European Summer Time (UTC+2)

The event was held over two days, with two rounds per day.

Date	Time	Round
7 August 2024	10:40; 14:10	Heats; Quarterfinals
10 August 2024	11:10; 13:10	Semifinals; Finals

== Results ==
=== Heats ===
Progression System: 1st-2nd to SF, rest to QF.

Heat 1

Rank	Lane	Kayaker	Country	Time	Notes
1	5	Fernando Pimenta	Portugal	3:29.76	SF
2	2	Uladzislau Kravets	Individual Neutral Athletes	3:32.07	SF
3	4	Jonas Ecker	United States	3:37.21	QF
4	3	Saeid Fazloula	Refugee Olympic Team	3:42.80	QF
5	6	Achraf El Aidi	Morocco	3:50.36	QF
6	7	Tuva'a Clifton	Samoa	3:54.49	QF

Heat 2

Rank	Lane	Kayaker	Country	Time	Notes
1	2	Anton Winkelmann	Germany	3:27.80	SF
2	5	Martin Nathell	Sweden	3:28.36	SF
3	6	Francisco Cubelos	Spain	3:28.40	QF
4	4	Zhang Dong	China	3:35.83	QF
5	3	René Holten Poulsen	Denmark	3:40.14	QF
6	7	Aaron Small	United States	3:40.87	QF

Heat 3

Rank	Lane	Kayaker	Country	Time	Notes
1	5	Bálint Kopasz	Hungary	3:26.44	SF
2	4	Agustín Vernice	Argentina	3:27.18	SF
3	7	Hamish Lovemore	South Africa	3:28.19	QF
4	3	Andrej Olijnik	Lithuania	3:38.02	QF
5	6	Matías Otero	Uruguay	3:43.65	QF
6	2	Bekarys Ramatulla	Kazakhstan	3:44.47	QF

Heat 4

Rank	Lane	Kayaker	Country	Time	Notes
1	7	Ádám Varga	Hungary	3:28.56	SF
2	5	Jakob Thordsen	Germany	3:29.88	SF
3	6	Maxime Beaumont	France	3:30.64	QF
4	4	Artuur Peters	Belgium	3:31.55	QF
5	2	Adrián del Río	Spain	3:33.81	QF
6	3	Ali Aghamirzaei	Iran	3:36.58	QF

Heat 5

Rank	Lane	Kayaker	Country	Time	Notes
1	4	Thomas Green	Australia	3:35.99	SF
2	5	Josef Dostál	Czech Republic	3:37.83	SF
3	6	Shakhriyor Makhkamov	Uzbekistan	3:40.25	QF
4	3	Vagner Souta	Brazil	3:46.17	QF
5	7	Andrew Birkett	South Africa	3:53.31	QF

=== Quarterfinals ===
Progression System: 1st-2nd to SF, rest out.

Quarterfinal 1

Rank	Lane	Kayaker	Country	Time	Notes
1	4	Maxime Beaumont	France	3:29.66	SF
2	7	Matías Otero	Uruguay	3:30.81	SF
3	8	Ali Aghamirzaei	Iran	3:33.78	
4	6	Zhang Dong	China	3:37.75	
5	5	Jonas Ecker	United States	3:41.77	
6	3	Vagner Souta	Brazil	3:50.72	
7	2	Tuva'a Clifton	Samoa	3:55.20	

Quarterfinal 2

Rank	Lane	Kayaker	Country	Time	Notes
1	3	René Holten Poulsen	Denmark	3:35.48	SF
2	5	Hamish Lovemore	South Africa	3:36.64	SF
3	7	Andrew Birkett	South Africa	3:38.11	
4	4	Saeid Fazloula	Refugee Olympic Team	3:40.94	
5	2	Bekarys Ramatulla	Kazakhstan	3:45.77	
6	6	Artuur Peters	Belgium	3:51.20	SF

Quarterfinal 3

Rank	Lane	Kayaker	Country	Time	Notes
1	7	Adrián del Río	Spain	3:30.39	SF
2	4	Francisco Cubelos	Spain	3:33.74	SF
3	5	Shakhriyor Makhkamov	Uzbekistan	3:35.43	
4	6	Andrej Olijnik	Lithuania	3:36.72	
5	2	Aaron Small	United States	3:42.05	
6	3	Achraf El Aidi	Morocco	4:02.27	

=== Semifinals ===
Progression: 1st-4th to Final A, rest to Final B.

Semifinal 1

Rank	Lane	Kayaker	Country	Time	Notes
1	4	Bálint Kopasz	Hungary	3:28.76	FA
2	5	Fernando Pimenta	Portugal	3:29.14	FA
3	2	Jakob Thordsen	Germany	3:29.34	FA
4	6	Martin Nathell	Sweden	3:30.14	FA
5	8	Francisco Cubelos	Spain	3:30.52	FB
6	0	Artuur Peters	Belgium	3:32.81	FB
7	3	Thomas Green	Australia	3:33.52	FB
8	7	René Holten Poulsen	Denmark	3:35.50	FB
9	1	Matías Otero	Uruguay	3:48.91	FB

Semifinal 2

Rank	Lane	Kayaker	Country	Time	Notes
1	5	Ádám Varga	Hungary	3:27.92	FA
2	6	Agustín Vernice	Argentina	3:28.18	FA
3	2	Josef Dostál	Czech Republic	3:29.05	FA
4	3	Uladzislau Kravets	Individual Neutral Athletes	3:29.64	FA
5	7	Maxime Beaumont	France	3:30.99	FB
6	8	Adrián del Río	Spain	3:31.07	FB
7	4	Anton Winkelmann	Germany	3:31.51	FB
8	1	Hamish Lovemore	South Africa	3:33.89	FB

=== Finals ===
Final A (For medals)

Rank	Lane	Kayaker	Country	Time	Notes
1st place, gold medalist(s)	1	Josef Dostál	Czech Republic	3:24.07	
2nd place, silver medalist(s)	2	Ádám Varga	Hungary	3:24.76	
3rd place, bronze medalist(s)	3	Bálint Kopasz	Hungary	3:25.68	
4	4	Uladzislau Kravets	Individual Neutral Athletes	3:28.10	
4	5	Agustín Vernice	Argentina	3:28.10	
6	6	Fernando Pimenta	Portugal	3:29.59	
7	7	Martin Nathell	Sweden	3:31.06	
8	8	Jakob Thordsen	Germany	3:36.82	

Final B (non-medal)

Rank	Lane	Kayaker	Country	Time	Notes
9	1	Hamish Lovemore	South Africa	3:27.94	
10	2	Anton Winkelmann	Germany	3:28.04	
11	3	Francisco Cubelos	Spain	3:28.10	
12	4	Adrián del Río	Spain	3:29.42	
13	5	Artuur Peters	Belgium	3:30.29	
14	6	Matías Otero	Uruguay	3:30.48	
15	7	Maxime Beaumont	France	3:31.42	
16	8	René Holten Poulsen	Denmark	3:31.62	
17	8	Thomas Green	Australia	3:32.72	
