= Canoe sprint at the 2019 European Games – Men's K-1 5000 metres =

Men's K-1 5000 metres at the 2019 European Games
- Venue: Zaslavl Regatta Course
- Date: 27 June
- Competitors: 21 from 21 nations
- Winning time: 21:45.255

Medalists
gold medal	Bálint Kopasz	Hungary
silver medal	Fernando Pimenta	Portugal
bronze medal	Max Hoff	Germany

The men's K-1 5000 metres canoe sprint competition at the 2019 European Games in Minsk took place on 27 June at the Zaslavl Regatta Course.

== Schedule ==
The schedule was as follows:

Date	Time	Round
Thursday 27 June 2019	16:30	Final

All times are Further-eastern European Time (UTC+3)

== Results ==
As a long-distance event, it was held as a direct final.

Rank	Kayaker	Country	Time
1st place, gold medalist(s)	Bálint Kopasz	Hungary	21:45.255
2nd place, silver medalist(s)	Fernando Pimenta	Portugal	21:46.554
3rd place, bronze medalist(s)	Max Hoff	Germany	21:49.276
4	Aleh Yurenia	Belarus	21:55.680
5	Eivind Vold	Norway	22:06.806
6	Rafał Rosolski	Poland	22:29.843
7	Francisco Cubelos	Spain	22:31.388
8	Joakim Lindberg	Sweden	22:32.724
9	Jošt Zakrajšek	Slovenia	22:40.323
10	Nicola Ripamonti	Italy	22:44.268
11	Maxim Spesivtsev	Russia	22:56.813
12	Cyrille Carré	France	23:04.841
13	Artuur Peters	Belgium	23:08.947
14	René Holten Poulsen	Denmark	23:10.981
15	Samuel Baláž	Slovakia	23:11.310
16	Ronan Foley	Ireland	23:16.064
17	Oleksandr Syromiatnykov	Ukraine	23:29.990
18	Miika Nykänen	Finland	23:55.279
19	Andri Summermatter	Switzerland	23:58.519
20	Jakub Zavřel	Czech Republic	25:05.791
21	Vladimir Alaverdyan	Armenia	25:36.645
