= 2025 ICF Canoe Sprint World Championships – Men's K-1 1000 metres =

Men's K-1 1000 metres at the 2025 ICF Canoe Sprint World Championships
- Venue: Idroscalo Regatta Course
- Location: Milan, Italy
- Dates: 20–23 August
- Competitors: 45 from 45 nations
- Winning time: 3:25.50

Medalists
gold medal	Bálint Kopasz	Hungary
silver medal	Thomas Green	Australia
bronze medal	Fernando Pimenta	Portugal

The men's K-1 1000 metres competition at the 2025 ICF Canoe Sprint World Championships in Milan took place in Idroscalo Regatta Course.

== Schedule ==
The schedule is as follows:

Date	Time	Round
Wednesday 20 August 2025	13:43	Heats
Friday 22 August 2025	10:10	Semifinal B
Friday 22 August 2025	10:31	Semifinal A
Saturday 23 August 2025	13:50	Final E
Saturday 23 August 2025	13:57	Final D
Saturday 23 August 2025	14:04	Final C
Saturday 23 August 2025	14:11	Final B
Saturday 23 August 2025	14:56	Final A

== Results ==
=== Heats ===
The four fastest boats in each heat (SA) and fastest three remaining boats 5th ranked boats (sA) advanced to the semi final A . Rest boats advanced to the semi final B (SB).

==== Heat 1 ====
Rank	Canoeist	Country	Time	Notes
1	Bálint Kopasz	Hungary	3:31.59	SA
2	Quaid Thompson	New Zealand	3:34.60	SA
3	Jon Amund Vold	Norway	3:37.01	SA
4	Oleksandr Syromiatnykov	Ukraine	3:37.61	SA
5	Mizuki Aoki	Japan	3:38.05	sA
6	Fernandes Ngunza	Angola	4:08.92	SB
	Achraf Elaidi	Morocco	DNS	
	Abdillahi Youssouf Elmi	Djibouti	DNS	

==== Heat 2 ====
Rank	Canoeist	Country	Time	Notes
1	Thomas Green	Australia	3:29.17	SA
2	Josef Dostál	Czech Republic	3:31.65	SA
3	Roi Rodríguez	Spain	3:32.75	SA
4	Hamish Lovemore	South Africa	3:33.47	SA
5	Dmitrii Avdeev	Individual Neutral Athletes	3:33.65	sA
6	Maxime Margely	France	3:35.09	SB
7	Kirill Tubayev	Kazakhstan	3:41.59	SB
8	Eldrik Dailoo	Seychelles	7:41.35	SB

==== Heat 3 ====
Rank	Canoeist	Country	Time	Notes
1	Agustín Vernice	Argentina	3:28.51	SA
2	Samuel Baláž	Slovakia	3:31.65	SA
3	Matías Otero	Uruguay	3:35.87	SA
4	Timon Maurer	Austria	3:39.44	SA
5	Eetu Kolehmainen	Finland	3:42.24	SB
6	Mateo Pérez	Colombia	3:52.46	SB
7	Mohamed Ismail	Egypt	3:53.34	SB
8	Jeyhun Valikhanov	Azerbaijan	3:56.79	SB

==== Heat 4 ====
Rank	Canoeist	Country	Time	Notes
1	Fernando Pimenta	Portugal	3:27.93	SA
2	Thorbjørn Rask	Denmark	3:29.36	SA
3	Uladzislau Kravets	Individual Neutral Athletes	3:30.23	SA
4	Jonas Ecker	United States	3:31.09	SA
5	Miroslav Kirchev	Bulgaria	3:31.56	sA
6	Zhang Dong	China	3:33.07	SB
7	Shokhrukhbek Azamov	Uzbekistan	3:39.63	SB
8	Kristians Lauris	Latvia	3:53.13	SB

==== Heat 5 ====
Rank	Canoeist	Country	Time	Notes
1	Jakob Thordsen	Germany	3:31.67	SA
2	Martin Nathell	Sweden	3:33.24	SA
3	Luca Lauper	Switzerland	3:34.41	SA
4	Jošt Zakrajšek	Slovenia	3:34.94	SA
5	Vincent Jourdenais	Canada	3:42.92	SB
6	Lee Kyeong-hun	South Korea	3:49.01	SB
7	Varinder Singh	India	3:53.06	SB
8	Penh Yu-sheng	Chinese Taipei	3:58.60	SB

==== Heat 6 ====
Rank	Canoeist	Country	Time	Notes
1	Bojan Zdelar	Serbia	3:32.44	SA
2	Artuur Peters	Belgium	3:33.38	SA
3	Andrea Schera	Italy	3:34.24	SA
4	Daniel Johnson	Great Britain	3:34.39	SA
5	Albart Flier	Netherlands	3:38.89	SB
6	Rodion Tuigunov	Kyrgyzstan	3:51.77	SB
7	Jovi Jayden Kalaichelvan	Singapore	3:57.06	SB

=== Semifinals B ===
The fastest three boats in each semi advanced to the D final. The next three fastest boats in each semi advanced to the final E.

==== Semifinal B1 ====
Rank	Canoeist	Country	Time	Notes
1	Maxime Margely	France	3:41.22	FD
2	Vincent Jourdenais	Canada	3:48.57	FD
3	Kristians Lauris	Latvia	3:54.23	FD
4	Lee Kyeong-hun	South Korea	3:54.94	FE
5	Mohamed Ismail	Egypt	3:55.55	FE

==== Semifinal B2 ====
Rank	Canoeist	Country	Time	Notes
1	Kirill Tubayev	Kazakhstan	3:47.42	FD
2	Albart Flier	Netherlands	3:50.01	FD
3	Fernandes Ngunza	Angola	3:55.55	FD
4	Varinder Singh	India	3:55.73	FE
5	Jovi Jayden Kalaichelvan	Singapore	3:57.15	FE
6	Jeyhun Valikhanov	Azerbaijan	4:02.26	FE
7	Zhang Dong	China	4:09.53	

==== Semifinal B3 ====
Rank	Canoeist	Country	Time	Notes
1	Shokhrukhbek Azamov	Uzbekistan	3:40.62	FD
2	Eetu Kolehmainen	Finland	3:42.57	FD
3	Rodion Tuigunov	Kyrgyzstan	3:52.24	FD
4	Mateo Pérez	Colombia	3:56.64	FE
5	Penh Yu-sheng	Chinese Taipei	4:04.93	FE
6	Eldrik Dailoo	Seychelles	5:42.32	FE

=== Semifinals A ===
The fastest three boats in each semi advanced to the A final. The next three fastest boats in each semi advanced to the final B.The rest boats advanced to the C final

==== Semifinal A1 ====
Rank	Canoeist	Country	Time	Notes
1	Thomas Green	Australia	3:30.53	FA
2	Samuel Baláž	Slovakia	3:31.05	FA
3	Uladzislau Kravets	Individual Neutral Athletes	3:31.37	FA
4	Hamish Lovemore	South Africa	3:32.28	FB
5	Jakob Thordsen	Germany	3:35.31	FB
6	Andrea Schera	Italy	3:35.62	FB
7	Jošt Zakrajšek	Slovenia	3:38.20	FC
8	Jon Amund Vold	Norway	3:39.70	FC
9	Mizuki Aoki	Japan	3:40.49	FC

==== Semifinal A2 ====
Rank	Canoeist	Country	Time	Notes
1	Bálint Kopasz	Hungary	3:28.92	FA
2	Fernando Pimenta	Portugal	3:29.45	FA
3	Josef Dostál	Czech Republic	3:30.47	FA
4	Martin Nathell	Sweden	3:31.37	FB
5	Matías Otero	Uruguay	3:31.89	FB
6	Jonas Ecker	United States	3:32.55	FB
7	Artuur Peters	Belgium	3:36.62	FC
8	Oleksandr Syromiatnykov	Ukraine	3:38.74	FC
9	Miroslav Kirchev	Bulgaria	3:42.39	FC

==== Semifinal A3 ====
Rank	Canoeist	Country	Time	Notes
1	Thorbjørn Rask	Denmark	3:31.32	FA
2	Agustín Vernice	Argentina	3:32.05	FA
3	Roi Rodríguez	Spain	3:32.68	FA
4	Bojan Zdelar	Serbia	3:34.74	FB
5	Luca Lauper	Switzerland	3:34.77	FB
6	Quaid Thompson	New Zealand	3:35.00	FB
7	Daniel Johnson	Great Britain	3:35.62	FC
8	Timon Maurer	Austria	3:37.14	FC
9	Dmitrii Avdeev	Individual Neutral Athletes	3:39.38	FC

=== Finals ===
==== Final E ====
Competitors in this final raced for positions 37 to 44

Rank	Canoeist	Country	Time	Notes
1	Lee Kyeong-hun	South Korea	3:48.62	
2	Penh Yu-sheng	Chinese Taipei	3:49.02	
3	Mateo Pérez	Colombia	3:49.38	
4	Varinder Singh	India	3:49.92	
5	Mohamed Ismail	Egypt	3:52.46	
6	Jovi Jayden Kalaichelvan	Singapore	3:56.72	
7	Jeyhun Valikhanov	Azerbaijan	4:06.59	
8	Eldrik Dailoo	Seychelles	5:23.64	

==== Final D ====
Competitors in this final raced for positions 28 to 36

Rank	Canoeist	Country	Time	Notes
1	Maxime Margely	France	3:35.46	
2	Shokhrukhbek Azamov	Uzbekistan	3:36.86	
3	Kirill Tubayev	Kazakhstan	3:40.49	
4	Albart Flier	Netherlands	3:41.89	
5	Eetu Kolehmainen	Finland	3:42.03	
6	Kristians Lauris	Latvia	3:48.37	
7	Rodion Tuigunov	Kyrgyzstan	3:49.07	
8	Vincent Jourdenais	Canada	3:52.93	
9	Fernandes Ngunza	Angola	4:06.53	

==== Final C ====
Competitors in this final raced for positions 19 to 27

Rank	Canoeist	Country	Time	Notes
1	Artuur Peters	Belgium	3:33.96	
2	Daniel Johnson	Great Britain	3:35.34	
3	Miroslav Kirchev	Bulgaria	3:36.61	
4	Timon Maurer	Austria	3:37.52	
5	Jon Amund Vold	Norway	3:37.94	
6	Dmitrii Avdeev	Individual Neutral Athletes	3:38.11	
7	Jošt Zakrajšek	Slovenia	3:39.81	
8	Oleksandr Syromiatnykov	Ukraine	3:41.70	
9	Mizuki Aoki	Japan	3:42.54	

==== Final B ====
Competitors in this final raced for positions 10 to 18.

Rank	Canoeist	Country	Time	Notes
1	Jakob Thordsen	Germany	3:29.19	
2	Hamish Lovemore	South Africa	3:30.90	
3	Jonas Ecker	United States	3:31.85	
4	Martin Nathell	Sweden	3:32.23	
5	Luca Lauper	Switzerland	3:33.94	
6	Quaid Thompson	New Zealand	3:34.27	
7	Bojan Zdelar	Serbia	3:35.98	
8	Andrea Schera	Italy	3:37.27	
9	Matías Otero	Uruguay	3:44.52	

==== Final A ====
Competitors raced for positions 1 to 9, with medals going to the top three.

Rank	Canoeist	Country	Time	Notes
1st place, gold medalist(s)	Bálint Kopasz	Hungary	3:25.50	
2nd place, silver medalist(s)	Thomas Green	Australia	3:25.68	
3rd place, bronze medalist(s)	Fernando Pimenta	Portugal	3:26.16	
4	Josef Dostál	Czech Republic	3:28.49	
5	Agustín Vernice	Argentina	3:28.92	
6	Samuel Baláž	Slovakia	3:29.78	
7	Uladzislau Kravets	Individual Neutral Athletes	3:30.16	
8	Roi Rodríguez	Spain	3:31.09	
9	Thorbjørn Rask	Denmark	3:42.49	
