= 2026 ICF Canoe Sprint World Championships – Men's K-1 1000 metres =

Men's K-1 1000 metres at the 2026 ICF Canoe Sprint World Championships
- Location: Poznań, Poland
- Dates: 26–29 August
- Competitors: 47
- Winning time: 3:24.39

Medalists
gold medal	Fernando Pimenta	Portugal
silver medal	Bálint Kopasz	Hungary
bronze medal	Thomas Green	Australia

The men's K-1 1000 metres competition at the 2026 ICF Canoe Sprint World Championships in Poznań took place between 26 and 28 August 2026.

== Schedule ==
The schedule is as follows:

Date	Time	Round
Wednesday 26 August 2026	15:28	Heats
Friday 28 August 2026	10:43	Semifinals
Friday 28 August 2026	14:40	Final C
Friday 28 August 2026	14:47	Final B
Friday 28 August 2026	15:26	Final A

== Results ==
=== Heats ===
Four heats were held on morning of 26 August 2026.

Qualification rule : First four in each heat (SF) plus three next fastest (qBT) qualify for semi-finals; remainder are eliminated.

==== Heat 1 ====
Rank	Canoeist	Country	Time	Notes
1	Jonas Ecker	United States	3:53.36	QS
2	Tomáš Sobíšek	Czech Republic	3:54.91	QS
3	Daniel Johnson	Great Britain	3:55.38	QS
4	Oleksandr Syromiatnykov	Ukraine	3:56.57	QS
5	Sebastian Alveal	Chile	4:00.70	qBT
6	Mauricio Figueroa	Mexico	4:04.51	
7	Fred Kahu	Estonia	4:05.06	
8	Bu Tunur Saud	Saudi Arabia	4:56.50	

==== Heat 2 ====
Rank	Canoeist	Country	Time	Notes
1	Thomas Green	Australia	3:49.80	QS
2	Hamish Lovemore	South Africa	3:53.04	QS
3	Shakhriyor Makhkamov	Uzbekistan	3:53.86	QS
4	Guillaume Keller	France	3:54.15	QS
5	Diogo Araujo	Cape Verde	4:14.84	QS
6	Mateo Pérez	Colombia	4:15.35	
7	Fernandes Ngunza	Angola	4:41.16	
8	Kron Balidemaj	Kosovo	4:41.82	

==== Heat 3 ====
Rank	Canoeist	Country	Time	Notes
1	Bálint Kopasz	Hungary	3:48.02	QS
2	Tobias Hammer	Germany	3:48.84	QS
3	Martin Nathell	Sweden	3:50.46	QS
4	Matías Otero	Uruguay	3:55.98	QS
5	Danylo Michuda	Latvia	3:58.30	qBT
6	Albart Flier	Netherlands	4:05.73	
7	Panagiotis Antoniou	Greece	4:08.38	
	Indra Hidayat	Indonesia	DNS	

==== Heat 4 ====
Rank	Canoeist	Country	Time	Notes
1	Uladzislau Kravets	Neutral Athlete B	3:55.08	QS
2	Samuel Balaz	Slovakia	3:56.99	QS
3	Quaid Thompson	New Zealand	3:59.46	QS
4	Eetu Kolehmainen	Finland	4:04.19	QS
5	Miroslav Kirchev	Bulgaria	4:07.02	QS
6	Jason Burkholder	Canada	4:08.86	
7	Denis Klenin	Kazakhstan	4:09.73	
8	Naocha Singh Laitonjam	India	4:24.47	

==== Heat 5 ====
Rank	Canoeist	Country	Time	Notes
1	Agustin Vernice	Argentina	3:50.62	QS
2	Thorbjørn Rask	Denmark	3:53.09	QS
3	Francisco Cubellos	Spain	3:53.95	QS
4	Przemyslaw Korsak	Poland	3:54.09	QS
5	Hasan Saraç	Turkey	3:59.24	qBT
6	Daniel Sirotin	Cyprus	4:11.22	
7	Mohamed Ismail	Egypt	4:15.05	
8	Mehdi Berkani	Algeria	4:34.35	

==== Heat 6 ====
Rank	Canoeist	Country	Time	Notes
1	Fernando Pimenta	Portugal	3:51.24	QS
2	Andrea Schera	Italy	3:54.01	QS
3	Amund Vold	Norway	3:55.34	QS
4	Bojan Zdelar	Serbia	4:00.72	QS
5	Li Jinyang	China	4:02.15	
6	Nevo Kleinman	Israel	4:08.47	
7	Slehddine Maknine	Tunisia	4:29.95	

=== Semifinals ===
Three semi finals were held on morning of 27 August 2026.

Qualification rule : First three in each heat to A final (FA) next three in each heat to B final (FB); remainder to C final (FC).

==== Semifinal 1 ====
Rank	Canoeist	Country	Time	Notes
1	Jonas Ecker	United States	3:55.25	FA
2	Uladzislau Kravets	Neutral Athlete B	3:55.25	FA
3	Tobias Hammer	Germany	3:58.18	FA
4	Andrea Schera	Italy	4:00.44	FB
5	Francisco Cubelos	Spain	4:03.92	FB
6	Eetu Kolehmainen	Finland	4:04.01	FB
7	Danylo Michuda	Latvia	4:04.48	FC
8	Oleksandr Syromiatnykov	Ukraine	4:04.49	FC
9	Shakhriyor Makhkamov	Uzbekistan	4:13.38	FC

==== Semifinal 2 ====
Rank	Canoeist	Country	Time	Notes
1	Thomas Green	Australia	3:51.97	FA
2	Martin Nathell	Sweden	3:54.30	FA
3	Samuel Balaz	Slovakia	3:54.59	FA
4	Agustín Vernice	Argentina	3:55.04	FB
5	Tomáš Sobíšek	Czech Republic	3:59.40	FB
6	Guillaume Keller	France	4:00.77	FB
7	Przemyslaw Korsak	Poland	4:01.70	FC
8	Amund Vold	Norway	4:03.86	FC
9	Hasan Saraç	Turkey	4:09.35	FC

==== Semifinal 3 ====
Rank	Canoeist	Country	Time	Notes
1	Fernando Pimenta	Portugal	3:58.59	FA
2	Bálint Kopasz	Hungary	3:58.83	FA
3	Thorbjørn Rask	Denmark	4:00.45	FA
4	Hamish Lovemore	South Africa	4:03.02	FB
5	Matías Otero	Uruguay	4:05.14	FB
6	Quaid Thompson	New Zealand	4:05.80	FB
7	Daniel Johnson	Great Britain	4:07.46	FC
8	Sebastian Alveal	Chile	4:08.36	FC
9	Bojan Zdelar	Serbia	DNS	

=== Finals ===
The finals were held on the afternoon of 29 August.

==== Final C ====
Rank	Canoeist	Country	Time	Notes
1	Przemyslaw Korsak	Poland	3:32.64	
2	Amund Vold	Norway	3:34.49	
3	Oleksandr Syromiatnykov	Ukraine	3:36.12	
4	Daniel Johnson	Great Britain	3:36.82	
5	Sebastian Alveal	Chile	3:36.86	
6	Danylo Michuda	Latvia	3:37.25	
7	Shakhriyor Makhkamov	Uzbekistan	3:37.79	
8	Hasan Saraç	Turkey	3:37.90	

==== Final B ====
Rank	Canoeist	Country	Time	Notes
1	Hamish Lovemore	South Africa	3:30.08	
2	Francisco Cubelos	Spain	3:30.40	
3	Agustín Vernice	Argentina	3:33.64	
4	Andrea Schera	Italy	3:34.34	
5	Tomáš Sobíšek	Czech Republic	3:35.02	
6	Guillaume Keller	France	3:36.86	
7	Quaid Thompson	New Zealand	3:37.00	
8	Matías Otero	Uruguay	3:43.04	
9	Eetu Kolehmainen	Finland	3:44.52	

==== Final A ====
Rank	Canoeist	Country	Time	Notes
1st place, gold medalist(s)	Fernando Pimenta	Portugal	3:24.39	
2nd place, silver medalist(s)	Bálint Kopasz	Hungary	3:24.61	
3rd place, bronze medalist(s)	Thomas Green	Australia	3:25.80	
4	Uladzislau Kravets	Neutral Athlete B	3:25.99	
5	Jonas Ecker	United States	3:27.87	
6	Thorbjørn Rask	Denmark	3:28.92	
7	Samuel Balaz	Slovakia	3:29.90	
8	Martin Nathell	Sweden	3:30.04	
9	Tobias Hammer	Germany	3:34.38	
