= Canoe sprint at the 2019 European Games – Men's K-1 1000 metres =

Men's K-1 1000 metres at the 2019 European Games
- Venue: Zaslavl Regatta Course
- Date: 25–26 June
- Competitors: 25 from 25 nations
- Winning time: 3:30.936

Medalists
gold medal	Bálint Kopasz	Hungary
silver medal	Fernando Pimenta	Portugal
bronze medal	Aleh Yurenia	Belarus

The men's K-1 1000 metres canoe sprint competition at the 2019 European Games in Minsk took place between 25 and 26 June at the Zaslavl Regatta Course.

== Schedule ==
The schedule was as follows:

Date	Time	Round
Tuesday 25 June 2019	09:00	Heats
Tuesday 25 June 2019	15:30	Semifinals
Wednesday 26 June 2019	10:00	Final B
Wednesday 26 June 2019	10:10	Final A

All times are Further-eastern European Time (UTC+3)

== Results ==
=== Heats ===
Heat winners advanced directly to the A final. The next six fastest boats in each heat advanced to the semifinals.

==== Heat 1 ====
Rank	Kayaker	Country	Time	Notes
1	Fernando Pimenta	Portugal	3:30.588	QA
2	Aleh Yurenia	Belarus	3:31.591	QS
3	René Holten Poulsen	Denmark	3:32.508	QS
4	Thomas Lusty	Great Britain	3:32.643	QS
5	Lars Magne Ullvang	Norway	3:34.536	QS
6	Artuur Peters	Belgium	3:34.573	QS
7	Ákos Gacsal	Slovakia	3:39.221	QS
8	Darko Savić	Bosnia and Herzegovina	3:58.566	
9	Vladimir Maleski	North Macedonia	4:09.808	

==== Heat 2 ====
Rank	Kayaker	Country	Time	Notes
1	Bálint Kopasz	Hungary	3:28.628	QA
2	Maxim Spesivtsev	Russia	3:33.393	QS
3	Jakub Špicar	Czech Republic	3:34.928	QS
4	Miroslav Kirchev	Bulgaria	3:35.443	QS
5	Martin Nathell	Sweden	3:36.173	QS
6	Aurélien Le Gall	France	3:40.275	QS
7	Andri Summermatter	Switzerland	3:40.388	QS
8	Miika Nykänen	Finland	3:51.775	

==== Heat 3 ====
Rank	Kayaker	Country	Time	Notes
1	Roi Rodríguez	Spain	3:29.790	QA
2	Rafał Rosolski	Poland	3:29.902	QS
3	Jošt Zakrajšek	Slovenia	3:34.220	QS
4	Antun Novaković	Croatia	3:35.412	QS
5	Giulio Dressino	Italy	3:38.232	QS
6	Tamás Gecsö	Germany	3:40.605	QS
7	Ronan Foley	Ireland	3:42.397	QS
8	Oleh Kukharyk	Ukraine	4:03.837	

=== Semifinals ===
The fastest three boats in each semi advanced to the A final. The next four fastest boats in each semi, plus the fastest remaining boat advanced to the B final.

==== Semifinal 1 ====
Rank	Kayaker	Country	Time	Notes
1	Aleh Yurenia	Belarus	3:26.364	QA
2	Artuur Peters	Belgium	3:27.084	QA
3	Thomas Lusty	Great Britain	3:27.531	QA
4	Jošt Zakrajšek	Slovenia	3:28.086	QB
5	Martin Nathell	Sweden	3:29.436	QB
6	Jakub Špicar	Czech Republic	3:29.766	QB
7	Antun Novaković	Croatia	3:31.059	QB
8	Tamás Gecsö	Germany	3:32.686	
9	Andri Summermatter	Switzerland	3:34.631	

==== Semifinal 2 ====
Rank	Kayaker	Country	Time	Notes
1	Maxim Spesivtsev	Russia	3:25.865	QA
2	Rafał Rosolski	Poland	3:26.615	QA
3	René Holten Poulsen	Denmark	3:26.832	QA
4	Miroslav Kirchev	Bulgaria	3:27.245	QB
5	Giulio Dressino	Italy	3:27.820	QB
6	Ákos Gacsal	Slovakia	3:30.890	QB
7	Lars Magne Ullvang	Norway	3:31.685	QB
8	Aurélien Le Gall	France	3:32.577	qB
9	Ronan Foley	Ireland	3:37.385	

=== Finals ===
==== Final B ====
Competitors in this final raced for positions 10 to 18.

Rank	Kayaker	Country	Time
1	Lars Magne Ullvang	Norway	3:35.754
2	Jošt Zakrajšek	Slovenia	3:38.131
3	Jakub Špicar	Czech Republic	3:38.544
4	Giulio Dressino	Italy	3:38.596
5	Martin Nathell	Sweden	3:39.806
6	Antun Novaković	Croatia	3:42.226
7	Ákos Gacsal	Slovakia	3:45.619
8	Miroslav Kirchev	Bulgaria	3:47.224
9	Aurélien Le Gall	France	3:48.346

==== Final A ====
Competitors in this final raced for positions 1 to 9, with medals going to the top three.

Rank	Kayaker	Country	Time
1st place, gold medalist(s)	Bálint Kopasz	Hungary	3:30.936
2nd place, silver medalist(s)	Fernando Pimenta	Portugal	3:31.048
3rd place, bronze medalist(s)	Aleh Yurenia	Belarus	3:32.291
4	René Holten Poulsen	Denmark	3:34.033
5	Roi Rodríguez	Spain	3:34.778
6	Maxim Spesivtsev	Russia	3:35.978
7	Artuur Peters	Belgium	3:36.323
8	Thomas Lusty	Great Britain	3:36.868
9	Rafał Rosolski	Poland	3:37.311
