= 2022 ICF Canoe Sprint World Championships – Men's K-1 5000 metres =

Men's K-1 5000 metres at the 2022 ICF Canoe Sprint World Championships
- Venue: Lake Banook
- Location: Dartmouth, Canada
- Dates: 7 August
- Competitors: 24 from 24 nations
- Winning time: 21:34.26

Medalists
gold medal	Joakim Lindberg	Sweden
silver medal	Tamás Gecső	Germany
bronze medal	Francisco Cubelos	Spain

The men's K-1 5000 metres competition at the 2022 ICF Canoe Sprint World Championships in Dartmouth took place on Lake Banook.

== Schedule ==
The schedule is as follows:

Date	Time	Round
Sunday 7 August 2022	16:30	Final

== Results ==
As a long-distance event, it was held as a direct final.

Rank	Canoeist	Country	Time
1st place, gold medalist(s)	Joakim Lindberg	Sweden	21:34.26
2nd place, silver medalist(s)	Tamás Gecső	Germany	21:51.39
3rd place, bronze medalist(s)	Francisco Cubelos	Spain	21:54.46
4	Simon McTavish	Canada	22:03.71
5	Jošt Zakrajšek	Slovenia	22:16.34
6	Mark Keeling	South Africa	22:31.04
7	Thorbjorn Rask	Denmark	22:56.14
8	Bálint Noé	Hungary	22:56.68
9	Milan Dörner	Slovakia	22:58.42
10	Nicola Ripamonti	Italy	22:59.33
11	Albart Flier	Netherlands	23:07.09
12	Ričardas Nekriošius	Lithuania	23:22.87
13	Ryuji Matsushiro	Japan	23:46.40
14	Jonas Ecker	United States	24:16.01
15	Jeremy Hakala	Finland	KO
16	James Munro	New Zealand	KO
17	Ilya Podpolnyy	Israel	KO
18	Artuur Peters	Belgium	KO
19	Wei Teo	Singapore	KO
	Jean Westhuyzen	Australia	DNF
	Fernando Pimenta	Portugal	DNF
	Agustín Vernice	Argentina	DNF
	Erick Verdier	Uruguay	DNF
	Daniel Johnson	Great Britain	DNF
