= 2021 ICF Canoe Sprint World Championships – Men's K-1 1000 metres =

Men's K-1 1000 metres at the 2021 ICF Canoe Sprint World Championships
- Venue: Lake Bagsværd
- Location: Copenhagen, Denmark
- Dates: 16–18 September
- Competitors: 24 from 24 nations
- Winning time: 3:25.82

Medalists
gold medal	Fernando Pimenta	Portugal
silver medal	Bálint Kopasz	Hungary
bronze medal	Aleh Yurenia	Belarus

The men's K-1 1000 metres competition at the 2021 ICF Canoe Sprint World Championships in Copenhagen took place on Lake Bagsværd.

== Schedule ==
The schedule was as follows:

Date	Time	Round
Thursday 16 September 2021	10:20	Heats
Thursday 16 September 2021	18:19	Semifinals
Saturday 18 September 2021	09:46	Final B
Saturday 18 September 2021	11:22	Final A

All times are Central European Summer Time (UTC+2)

== Results ==
=== Heats ===
Heat winners advanced directly to the A final.
The next six fastest boats in each heat advanced to the semifinals.

==== Heat 1 ====
Rank	Kayaker	Country	Time	Notes
1	Bálint Kopasz	Hungary	3:46.13	QA
2	Rafał Rosolski	Poland	3:48.67	QS
3	Andrej Olijnik	Lithuania	3:50.03	QS
4	Charles Smith	Great Britain	3:52.33	QS
5	Miroslav Kirchev	Bulgaria	3:52.35	QS
6	Eetu Kolehmainen	Finland	4:03.23	QS
–	Jošt Zakrajšek	Slovenia	DNS	

==== Heat 2 ====
Rank	Kayaker	Country	Time	Notes
1	Fernando Pimenta	Portugal	3:38.52	QA
2	Martin Hiller	Germany	3:39.74	QS
3	René Holten Poulsen	Denmark	3:44.86	QS
4	Peter Gelle	Slovakia	3:45.06	QS
5	Quaid Thompson	New Zealand	3:45.14	QS
6	Jakub Zavřel	Czech Republic	3:46.37	QS
7	Simon McTavish	Canada	3:46.99	QS
8	Antun Novaković	Croatia	3:48.47	
9	Nicholas Robinson	Trinidad and Tobago	4:36.85	

==== Heat 3 ====
Rank	Kayaker	Country	Time	Notes
1	Aleh Yurenia	Belarus	3:45.45	QA
2	Bojan Zdelar	Serbia	3:48.70	QS
3	Roi Rodríguez	Spain	3:48.97	QS
4	Andrea Schera	Italy	3:50.40	QS
5	Oleg Siniavin	RCF	3:52.17	QS
6	Bram Brandjes	Netherlands	3:53.12	QS
7	Juan Rodríguez	Mexico	4:15.10	QS
–	Mohamed Mrabet	Tunisia	DNS	

=== Semifinals ===
Qualification was as follows:

The fastest three boats in each semi advanced to the A final.
The next four fastest boats in each semi, plus the fastest remaining boat advanced to the B final.

==== Semifinal 1 ====
Rank	Kayaker	Country	Time	Notes
1	Andrea Schera	Italy	3:38.72	QA
2	René Holten Poulsen	Denmark	3:39.85	QA
3	Charles Smith	Great Britain	3:40.54	QA
4	Simon McTavish	Canada	3:43.09	QB
5	Rafał Rosolski	Poland	3:43.29	QB
6	Quaid Thompson	New Zealand	3:43.52	QB
7	Bram Brandjes	Netherlands	3:44.84	QB
8	Roi Rodríguez	Spain	3:46.30	qB
9	Eetu Kolehmainen	Finland	3:46.32	

==== Semifinal 2 ====
Rank	Kayaker	Country	Time	Notes
1	Martin Hiller	Germany	3:39.78	QA
2	Andrej Olijnik	Lithuania	3:41.68	QA
3	Bojan Zdelar	Serbia	3:42.04	QA
4	Oleg Siniavin	RCF	3:42.83	QB
5	Miroslav Kirchev	Bulgaria	3:43.87	QB
6	Peter Gelle	Slovakia	3:52.61	QB
7	Jakub Zavřel	Czech Republic	4:12.83	QB
8	Juan Rodríguez	Mexico	4:30.45	

=== Finals ===
==== Final B ====
Competitors in this final raced for positions 10 to 18.

Rank	Kayaker	Country	Time
1	Roi Rodríguez	Spain	3:35.31
2	Quaid Thompson	New Zealand	3:36.13
3	Simon McTavish	Canada	3:36.49
4	Jakub Zavřel	Czech Republic	3:36.61
5	Rafał Rosolski	Poland	3:38.12
6	Oleg Siniavin	RCF	3:41.14
7	Peter Gelle	Slovakia	3:43.63
8	Bram Brandjes	Netherlands	3:45.86
9	Miroslav Kirchev	Bulgaria	3:50.98

==== Final A ====
Competitors raced for positions 1 to 9, with medals going to the top three.

Rank	Kayaker	Country	Time
1st place, gold medalist(s)	Fernando Pimenta	Portugal	3:25.82
2nd place, silver medalist(s)	Bálint Kopasz	Hungary	3:26.49
3rd place, bronze medalist(s)	Aleh Yurenia	Belarus	3:30.47
4	Andrea Schera	Italy	3:31.26
5	Martin Hiller	Germany	3:32.62
6	Andrej Olijnik	Lithuania	3:33.05
7	René Holten Poulsen	Denmark	3:35.20
8	Charles Smith	Great Britain	3:35.63
9	Bojan Zdelar	Serbia	3:36.05
