= 2023 ICF Canoe Sprint World Championships – Men's K-1 5000 metres =

Men's K-1 5000 metres at the 2023 ICF Canoe Sprint World Championships
- Venue: Sportpark Duisburg
- Location: Duisburg, Germany
- Dates: 27 August
- Competitors: 34 from 34 nations
- Winning time: 19:55.467

Medalists
gold medal	Mads Pedersen	Denmark
silver medal	Fernando Pimenta	Portugal
bronze medal	Nico Paufler	Germany

The men's K-1 5000 metres competition at the 2023 ICF Canoe Sprint World Championships in Duisburg took place in Sportpark Duisburg.

== Schedule ==
The schedule is as follows:

Date	Time	Round
Sunday 27 August 2023	16:05	Final

== Results ==
As a long-distance event, it was held as a direct final.

Rank	Canoeist	Country	Time
1st place, gold medalist(s)	Mads Pedersen	Denmark	19:55.467
2nd place, silver medalist(s)	Fernando Pimenta	Portugal	20:09.974
3rd place, bronze medalist(s)	Nico Paufler	Germany	20:36.042
4	Simon McTavish	Canada	20:36.456
5	Joakim Lindberg	Sweden	20:50.945
6	Eivind Vold	Norway	21:10.519
7	Quaid Thompson	New Zealand	21:13.363
8	Francisco Cubelos	Spain	21:14.450
9	Bálint Noé	Hungary	21:18.861
10	Rafał Rosolski	Poland	21:22.738
11	Jošt Zakrajšek	Slovenia	21:36.600
12	Agustín Rodríguez	Argentina	21:46.769
13	Albart Flier	Netherlands	21:53.489
14	Tomáš Sobíšek	Czech Republic	22:06.595
15	Nicola Ripamonti	Italy	22:07.403
16	Milan Dörner	Slovakia	22:12.814
17	Sulaiman Al-Samarraie	Iraq	22:19.906
18	Leocadio Pinto	Colombia	22:25.138
19	Quilian Koch	France	22:53.300
20	Jaakko Hippeläinen	Finland	22:54.591
21	Peyman Ghavidel Siah Sofiani	Iran	23:04.949
22	Callam Davis	South Africa	23:05.740
23	Rodion Tuigunov	Kyrgyzstan	23:13.874
24	Stefan Kleanthous	Cyprus	23:18.478
25	Oleksandr Syromiatnykov	Ukraine	23:20.266
26	Naocha Laitonjam	India	23:22.384
27	Aron Faber	Estonia	23:35.534
28	Zach Alva	United States	24:39.665
	Park Ju-hyeon	South Korea	DSQ
	Lin Yong-bo	Chinese Taipei	DSQ
	Simao Camazaulo	Angola	DSQ
	Ahmed Mohammed	Egypt	DSQ
	Slehddine Maknine	Tunisia	DSQ
	Ousmane Mbaye	Senegal	DSQ
	Ayoub Haidra	Algeria	DNS
	Ilya Podpolnyy	Israel	DNS
	Ray Acuna	Venezuela	DNS
