= 2024 ICF Canoe Sprint World Championships – Men's K-1 5000 metres =

Men's K-1 5000 metres at the 2024 ICF Canoe Sprint World Championships
- Venue: Rowing and Canoeing Race Course in Samarkand
- Location: Samarkand, Uzbekistan
- Dates: 25 August
- Competitors: 25 from 25 nations
- Winning time: 22:39.488

Medalists
gold medal	Mads Pedersen	Denmark
silver medal	Fernando Pimenta	Portugal
bronze medal	Joakim Lindberg	Sweden

The men's K-1 5000 metres competition at the 2024 ICF Canoe Sprint World Championships in Samarkand took place in Rowing and Canoeing Race Course in Samarkand.

== Schedule ==
The schedule is as follows:

Date	Time	Round
Sunday 25 August 2024	17:39	Final

== Results ==
As a long-distance event, it was held as a direct final.

Rank	Canoeist	Country	Time
1st place, gold medalist(s)	Mads Pedersen	Denmark	22:39.488
2nd place, silver medalist(s)	Fernando Pimenta	Portugal	22:55.097
3rd place, bronze medalist(s)	Joakim Lindberg	Sweden	22:59.119
4	Csaba Erdőssy	Hungary	23:32.419
5	Nico Paufler	Germany	23:45.016
6	Adrián Martín	Spain	23:48.710
7	Jon Amund Vold	Norway	24:04.871
8	Jakub Zavřel	Czech Republic	24:10.867
9	Jošt Zakrajšek	Slovenia	24:22.655
10	Kyle Friedenstein	South Africa	24:40.108
11	Oleksandr Syromiatnykov	Ukraine	25:21.106
12	Denis Klenin	Kazakhstan	25:23.716
13	Yaroslav Slavgorodskiy	Uzbekistan	26:06.341
	Sulaiman Al-Samarraie	Iraq	DNF
	Park Juhyeon	South Korea	DNF
	Nekruz Zuhurov	Tajikistan	DNF
	Nathan Humberston	United States	DNF
	Aleh Yurenia	Authorised Neutral Athletes	DNF
	Samuel Baláž	Slovakia	DNF
	Altynbek Baktyiarov	Kyrgyzstan	DNF
	Daniel Roman	Venezuela	DNF
	Zhang Yueping	China	DNF
	Jérémy Leray	France	DSQ
	Mateo Pérez	Colombia	DNS
	Seiji Komatsu	Japan	DSQ
