= Canoeing at the 2013 Summer Universiade – Men's K1 1000 metres =

The men's 1000m one man kayak race was held between July 13–14.

== Medalists ==
Gold	Silver	Bronze
Fernando Pimenta; Portugal	Aleh Yurenia; Belarus	Rafal Rosolski; Poland

== Results ==
=== Preliminary rounds ===
The winner of each heat advances to the finals, the others go to the semifinals.

==== Heat 1 ====
Rank	Name	Nationality	Time	Notes
1	Aleh Yurenia	Belarus	3:46.971	QF
2	Aron Schenk	Hungary	3:30.951	QS
3	Michel Ferreira	Brazil	3:53.694	QS
4	Filippo Vincenzi	Italy	3:57.563	QS
5	Jeonghyun Cho	South Korea	3:58.945	QS
6	Aaron Murphy	Australia	4:02.56	QS
7	Yusake Miyata	Japan	4:03.270	QS

==== Heat 2 ====
Rank	Name	Nationality	Time	Notes
1	Fernando Pimenta	Portugal	3:39.194	QF
2	Alexey Mochalov	Uzbekistan	3:39.851	QS
3	Dmitrii Ekimov	Russia	3:42.925	QS
4	Jakub Adam	Czech Republic	3:45.760	QS
5	Jesus Valdez Gonzalez	Mexico	3:53.332	QS
6	Ilya Golendov	Kazakhstan	3:54.474	QS
7	Calven Clack	South Africa	4:25.072	QS

==== Heat 3 ====
Rank	Name	Nationality	Time	Notes
1	Rafal Rosolski	Poland	3:44.299	QF
2	Lovro Leban	Slovenia	3:47.025	QS
3	Mindaugas Maldonis	Lithuania	3:48.085	QS
4	Andreas Deamantis	Cyprus	4:05.754	QS
5	Andrejs Birjukovs	Latvia	4:14.525	QS
6	Timothy Chia	Singapore	4:33.318	QS

=== Semi-finals ===
==== Semi Final 1 ====
The top three finishers in each semifinal advance to the finals, the others are eliminated.

Rank	Name	Nationality	Time	Notes
1	Dmitrii Ekimov	Russia	3:51.544	QF
2	Aron Schenk	Hungary	3:54.038	QF
3	Mindaugas Maldonis	Lithuania	3:55.399	QF
4	Jesus Valdez Gonzalez	Mexico	3:57.262	x
5	Andreas Diamantis	Cyprus	3:58.222	x
6	Filippo Vincenzi	Italy	4:01.699	x
7	Aaron Murphy	Australia	4:02.442	x
8	Calven Clark	South Africa	4:39.191	x
9	Timothy Chia	Singapore	4:41.587	x

==== Semi Final 2 ====
Rank	Name	Nationality	Time	Notes
1	Alexey Mochalov	Uzbekistan	3:52.298	QF
2	Lovro Leban	Slovenia	3:54.396	QF
3	Jakub Adam	Czech Republic	3:56.345	QF
4	Michel Ferreira	Brazil	4:01.164	x
5	Ilya Golendov	Kazakhstan	4:02.139	x
6	Jeonghyun Cho	South Korea	4:03.162	x
7	Yusuke Miyata	Japan	4:18.285	x
8	Andrejs Birjukovs	Latvia	4:26.236	x

=== Finals ===
Rank	Name	Nationality	Time	Notes
1st place, gold medalist(s)	Fernando Pimenta	Portugal	3:48.135	
2nd place, silver medalist(s)	Aleh Yurenia	Belarus	3:49.814	
3rd place, bronze medalist(s)	Rafal Rosolski	Poland	3:50.325	
4	Dmitrii Ekimov	Russia	3:52.242	
5	Aron Schenk	Hungary	3:55.699	
6	Lovro Leban	Slovenia	3:55.839	
7	Alexey Mochalov	Uzbekistan	3:58.129	
8	Jakub Adam	Czech Republic	4:00.678	
9	Mindaugas Maldonis	Lithuania	4:00.892	
