= 2023 ICF Canoe Sprint World Championships – Men's K-1 500 metres =

Men's K-1 500 metres at the 2023 ICF Canoe Sprint World Championships
- Venue: Sportpark Duisburg
- Location: Duisburg, Germany
- Dates: 23–25 August
- Competitors: 48 from 48 nations
- Winning time: 1:36.262

Medalists
gold medal	Bálint Kopasz	Hungary
silver medal	Jean van der Westhuyzen	Australia
bronze medal	Fernando Pimenta	Portugal

The men's K-1 500 metres competition at the 2023 ICF Canoe Sprint World Championships in Duisburg took place in Sportpark Duisburg.

== Schedule ==
The schedule is as follows:

Date	Time	Round
Wednesday 23 August 2023	09:45	Heats
Friday 25 August 2023	11:35	Semifinals
Friday 25 August 2023	16:34	Final A
Friday 25 August 2023	18:58	Final C
Friday 25 August 2023	19:03	Final B

== Results ==
=== Heats ===
The fastest four boats in each heat, plus the fastest three remaining boats, advanced to the semifinal.

==== Heat 1 ====
Rank	Canoeist	Country	Time	Notes
1	Fernando Pimenta	Portugal	1:38.804	QS
2	Íñigo Peña	Spain	1:39.466	QS
3	Ashton Reiser	New Zealand	1:40.558	QS
4	Yusuke Miyata	Japan	1:41.870	QS
5	Ahmed Sameer Jumaah Faris	Iraq	1:43.711	qS
6	Ayoub Haidra	Algeria	1:49.511	
7	Cheung Tsz Chun	Hong Kong	1:54.916	
8	Rodrigo González	Puerto Rico	1:58.611	
	Amosse Daimane	Mozambique	DNS	

==== Heat 2 ====
Rank	Canoeist	Country	Time	Notes
1	René Holten Poulsen	Denmark	1:39.275	QS
2	Francis Mouget	France	1:40.155	QS
3	Dennis Kernen	Sweden	1:40.446	QS
4	Rok Šmit	Slovenia	1:42.474	QS
5	Aron Faber	Estonia	1:45.169	
6	Rodion Tuigunov	Kyrgyzstan	1:46.102	
7	Tuva'a Clifton	Samoa	1:54.627	
8	Geovany Bofila	Angola	1:55.573	
	Naocha Laitonjam	India	DNS	

==== Heat 3 ====
Rank	Canoeist	Country	Time	Notes
1	Moritz Florstedt	Germany	1:37.742	QS
2	Bálint Kopasz	Hungary	1:38.087	QS
3	Saeid Fazloula	ICF	1:41.059	QS
4	Vemund Jensen	Norway	1:41.259	QS
5	Stefan Kleanthous	Cyprus	1:42.373	qS
6	Milan Dörner	Slovakia	1:42.977	
7	Achraf Elaidi	Morocco	1:51.481	
	Ray Acuna	Venezuela	DNS	

==== Heat 4 ====
Rank	Canoeist	Country	Time	Notes
1	Josef Dostál	Czech Republic	1:40.385	QS
2	Thomas Lusty	Great Britain	1:41.199	QS
3	Vladyslav Voloshin	Ukraine	1:41.486	QS
4	Aaron Small	United States	1:41.803	QS
5	Brandon Wei Cheng Ooi	Singapore	1:42.780	qS
6	Nicholas Weeks	South Africa	1:44.152	
7	Slehddine Maknine	Tunisia	1:51.073	
8	Nicholas Robinson	Trinidad and Tobago	1:55.168	
9	Pita Taufatofua	Tonga	2:21.420	

==== Heat 5 ====
Rank	Canoeist	Country	Time	Notes
1	Timon Maurer	Austria	1:39.153	QS
2	Tommaso Freschi	Italy	1:40.386	QS
3	Taha Usta	Turkey	1:45.665	QS
4	Juan Arbeláez	Colombia	1:47.879	QS
5	Park Ju-hyeon	South Korea	1:48.035	
6	Amado Cruz	Belize	1:50.278	
7	Milan Gajdobranski	United Arab Emirates	1:53.087	
8	Andre Tutaka-George	Cook Islands	1:56.244	

==== Heat 6 ====
Rank	Canoeist	Country	Time	Notes
1	Jean van der Westhuyzen	Australia	1:39.876	QS
2	Branko Lagundžić	Serbia	1:40.698	QS
3	Matias Otero	Uruguay	1:42.051	QS
4	Lin Yung-chieh	Chinese Taipei	1:43.346	QS
5	Brian Malfesi	Canada	1:44.167	
6	Rafik Saputra	Indonesia	1:48.065	
7	Nikola Maleski	North Macedonia	2:04.314	
8	Ousmane Mbaye	Senegal	2:07.149	

=== Semifinal ===
The fastest three boats in each semi advanced to the A final. The next three fastest boats in each semi advanced to the final B. The remaining boats advanced to the C final.

==== Semifinal 1 ====
Rank	Canoeist	Country	Time	Notes
1	Bálint Kopasz	Hungary	1:37.268	QA
2	Fernando Pimenta	Portugal	1:38.032	QA
3	Josef Dostál	Czech Republic	1:38.086	QA
4	Dennis Kernen	Sweden	1:38.509	QB
5	Branko Lagundžić	Serbia	1:38.568	QB
6	Yusuke Miyata	Japan	1:41.207	QB
7	Stefan Kleanthous	Cyprus	1:42.630	QC
8	Aaron Small	United States	1:44.136	QC
9	Taha Usta	Turkey	1:45.283	QC

==== Semifinal 2 ====
Rank	Canoeist	Country	Time	Notes
1	Timon Maurer	Austria	1:39.329	QA
2	Íñigo Peña	Spain	1:40.141	QA
3	René Holten Poulsen	Denmark	1:40.591	QA
4	Thomas Lusty	Great Britain	1:42.033	QB
5	Saeid Fazloula	ICF	1:43.519	QB
6	Rok Šmit	Slovenia	1:44.139	QB
7	Matias Otero	Uruguay	1:45.788	QC
8	Juan Arbeláez	Colombia	1:49.902	QC
	Brandon Wei Cheng Ooi	Singapore	DNS	

==== Semifinal 3 ====
Rank	Canoeist	Country	Time	Notes
1	Moritz Florstedt	Germany	1:38.992	QA
2	Jean van der Westhuyzen	Australia	1:39.152	QA
3	Tommaso Freschi	Italy	1:41.141	QA
4	Francis Mouget	France	1:41.991	QB
5	Ashton Reiser	New Zealand	1:42.070	QB
6	Vladyslav Voloshin	Ukraine	1:44.326	QB
7	Vemund Jensen	Norway	1:44.389	QC
8	Ahmed Sameer Jumaah Faris	Iraq	1:46.658	QC
9	Lin Yung-chieh	Chinese Taipei	1:50.649	QC

=== Finals ===
==== Final C ====
Competitors in this final raced for positions 19 to 27.

Rank	Canoeist	Country	Time
1	Matias Otero	Uruguay	1:40.515
2	Vemund Jensen	Norway	1:42.270
3	Aaron Small	United States	1:42.814
4	Ahmed Sameer Jumaah Faris	Iraq	1:44.333
5	Stefan Kleanthous	Cyprus	1:44.818
6	Lin Yung-chieh	Chinese Taipei	1:45.592
7	Taha Usta	Turkey	1:47.132
8	Juan Arbeláez	Colombia	1:48.979

==== Final B ====
Competitors in this final raced for positions 10 to 18.

Rank	Canoeist	Country	Time
1	Francis Mouget	France	1:40.044
2	Ashton Reiser	New Zealand	1:41.252
3	Thomas Lusty	Great Britain	1:41.367
4	Branko Lagundžić	Serbia	1:41.449
5	Dennis Kernen	Sweden	1:41.641
6	Yusuke Miyata	Japan	1:42.017
7	Saeid Fazloula	ICF	1:42.341
8	Rok Šmit	Slovenia	1:42.515
9	Vladyslav Voloshin	Ukraine	1:42.999

==== Final A ====
Competitors raced for positions 1 to 9, with medals going to the top three.

Rank	Canoeist	Country	Time
1st place, gold medalist(s)	Bálint Kopasz	Hungary	1:36.262
2nd place, silver medalist(s)	Jean van der Westhuyzen	Australia	1:36.632
3rd place, bronze medalist(s)	Fernando Pimenta	Portugal	1:36.908
4	Josef Dostál	Czech Republic	1:37.220
5	Moritz Florstedt	Germany	1:37.493
6	Timon Maurer	Austria	1:37.971
7	René Holten Poulsen	Denmark	1:38.321
8	Íñigo Peña	Spain	1:38.642
9	Tommaso Freschi	Italy	1:39.311
