= Tom Liebscher =

German canoeist (born 1993)

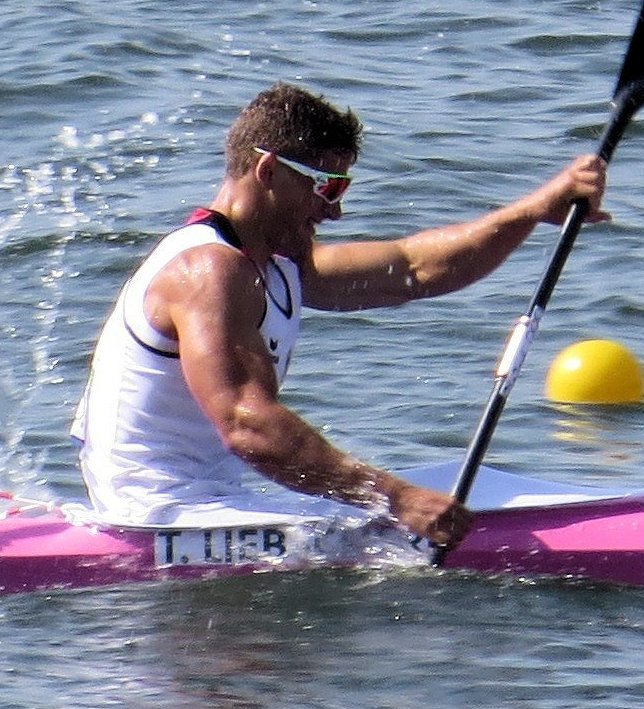
- Liebscher in 2016

Personal information
- Full name: Tom Liebscher-Lucz
- Born: 3 August 1993 (age 33) Dresden, Germany
- Height: 1.89 m (6 ft 2 in)
- Weight: 96 kg (212 lb)
- Spouse: Dora Lucz (m. 2022)

Sport
- Country: Germany
- Sport: Sprint kayak
- Events: K-1 200 m, K-1 500 m, K-1 1000 m, K-2 200 m, K-4 500 m, K-4 1000 m
- Club: Kanu Club Dresden
Medal record
Men's canoe sprint
Representing Germany
Olympic Games
Gold medal – first place	2016 Rio de Janeiro	K-4 1000 m
Gold medal – first place	2020 Tokyo	K-4 500 m
Gold medal – first place	2024 Paris	K-4 500 m
World Championships
Gold medal – first place	2013 Duisburg	K-1 500 m
Gold medal – first place	2017 Račice	K-1 1000 m
Gold medal – first place	2017 Račice	K-4 500 m
Gold medal – first place	2018 Montemor-o-Velho	K-4 500 m
Gold medal – first place	2019 Szeged	K-1 500 m
Gold medal – first place	2019 Szeged	K-4 500 m
Gold medal – first place	2023 Duisburg	K-4 500 m
Gold medal – first place	2026 Poznań	K-4 500 m
Silver medal – second place	2014 Moscow	K-2 200 m
Silver medal – second place	2015 Milan	K-1 500 m
Silver medal – second place	2018 Montemor-o-Velho	K-1 500 m
Silver medal – second place	2022 Dartmouth	K-4 500 m
European Championships
Gold medal – first place	2014 Brandenburg	K-1 500 m
Gold medal – first place	2014 Brandenburg	K-2 200 m
Gold medal – first place	2015 Račice	K-2 200 m
Gold medal – first place	2016 Moscow	K-1 500 m
Gold medal – first place	2021 Poznań	K-4 500 m
Gold medal – first place	2022 Munich	K-4 500 m
Gold medal – first place	2022 Munich	K-4 1000 m
Silver medal – second place	2015 Račice	K-1 500 m
Silver medal – second place	2018 Belgrade	K-4 500 m
Silver medal – second place	2026 Montemor-o-Velho	K-4 500 m
Bronze medal – third place	2013 Montemor-o-Velho	K-1 200 m
Bronze medal – third place	2016 Moscow	K-2 200 m
European Games
Silver medal – second place	2015 Baku	K-2 200 m
Silver medal – second place	2019 Minsk	K-4 500 m

Tom Liebscher-Lucz (born 3 August 1993) is a German Olympic canoeist. He represented his country at the 2016 Summer Olympics and won a gold medal in men's K-4 1000 m event with Max Rendschmidt, Max Hoff and Marcus Gross. He also earned gold medals with the German teams in the men's K-4 500 m events at the 2020 Summer Olympics and 2024 Summer Olympics.

Liebscher won gold in the men's K-1 500 m event at the 2013 ICF Canoe Sprint World Championships and 2019 World Championships and in the men's K-1 1000 m event at the 2017 World Championships.

He married Hungarian canoeist Dora Lucz in 2022.

== Major results ==
=== Olympics ===
Year	K-2 200	K-2 500	K-4 500	K-4 1000
2016	5	—N/a	—N/a	1st place, gold medalist(s)
2020	—N/a		1st place, gold medalist(s)	—N/a
2024	—N/a	5	1st place, gold medalist(s)	—N/a

=== World championships ===
Year	K-1 200	K-1 500	K-1 1000	K-2 200	K-4 500	K-1 4x200
2011					—N/a	4
2013	2 FB	1st place, gold medalist(s)			—N/a	8
2014				2nd place, silver medalist(s)	—N/a	5
2015		2nd place, silver medalist(s)		6	—N/a	—N/a
2017			1st place, gold medalist(s)		1st place, gold medalist(s)	—N/a
2018		2nd place, silver medalist(s)			1st place, gold medalist(s)	—N/a
2019		1st place, gold medalist(s)			1st place, gold medalist(s)	—N/a
2022				—N/a	2nd place, silver medalist(s)	—N/a
2023				—N/a	1st place, gold medalist(s)	—N/a
2025		5		—N/a		—N/a
2026		7		—N/a	1st place, gold medalist(s)	—N/a
