= Fernando Pimenta =

Portuguese canoeist (born 1989)

Fernando Pimenta GOIH ComM
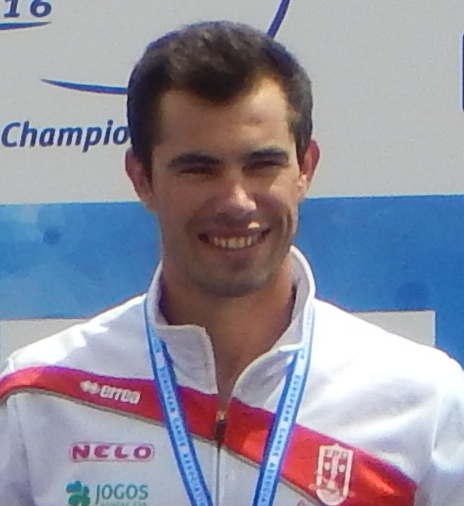
- Pimenta being awarded the K-1 1000 m gold medal at the 2016 European Championships

Personal information
- Full name: Fernando Ismael Fernandes Pimenta
- Born: 13 August 1989 (age 37) Ponte de Lima, Portugal
- Height: 1.79 m (5 ft 10 in)
- Weight: 81 kg (179 lb)
- Website: fernandopimenta.com

Sport
- Country: Portugal
- Sport: Sprint kayak
- Club: Benfica
- Coached by: Hélio Lucas
Medal record
Representing Portugal
Men's canoe sprint
Olympic Games
Silver medal – second place	2012 London	K-2 1000 m
Bronze medal – third place	2020 Tokyo	K-1 1000 m
World Championships
Gold medal – first place	2017 Račice	K-1 5000 m
Gold medal – first place	2018 Montemor-o-Velho	K-1 1000 m
Gold medal – first place	2018 Montemor-o-Velho	K-1 5000 m
Gold medal – first place	2021 Copenhagen	K-1 1000 m
Gold medal – first place	2023 Duisburg	K-1 1000 m
Gold medal – first place	2026 Poznań	K-1 1000 m
Gold medal – first place	2026 Poznań	K-1 5000 m
Silver medal – second place	2010 Poznań	K-2 500 m
Silver medal – second place	2014 Moscow	K-4 1000 m
Silver medal – second place	2017 Račice	K-1 1000 m
Silver medal – second place	2021 Copenhagen	K-1 5000 m
Silver medal – second place	2022 Dartmouth	K-1 1000 m
Silver medal – second place	2022 Dartmouth	K-2 Mix 500 m
Silver medal – second place	2023 Duisburg	K-1 5000 m
Silver medal – second place	2024 Samarkand	K-1 500 m
Silver medal – second place	2024 Samarkand	K-1 5000 m
Bronze medal – third place	2015 Milan	K-1 1000 m
Bronze medal – third place	2019 Szeged	K-1 1000 m
Bronze medal – third place	2019 Szeged	K-1 5000 m
Bronze medal – third place	2022 Dartmouth	K-1 500 m
Bronze medal – third place	2023 Duisburg	K-1 500 m
Bronze medal – third place	2025 Milan	K-1 1000 m
European Championships
Gold medal – first place	2011 Belgrade	K-4 1000 m
Gold medal – first place	2016 Moscow	K-1 1000 m
Gold medal – first place	2016 Moscow	K-1 5000 m
Gold medal – first place	2017 Plovdiv	K-1 1000 m
Gold medal – first place	2018 Belgrade	K-1 1000 m
Gold medal – first place	2022 Munich	K-1 5000 m
Gold medal – first place	2024 Szeged	K-1 5000 m
Gold medal – first place	2025 Račice	K-1 1000 m
Gold medal – first place	2025 Račice	K-1 5000 m
Gold medal – first place	2026 Montemor-o-Velho	K-1 5000 m
Silver medal – second place	2013 Montemor-o-Velho	K-4 1000 m
Silver medal – second place	2013 Montemor-o-Velho	K-1 5000 m
Silver medal – second place	2015 Račice	K-4 1000 m
Silver medal – second place	2017 Plovdiv	K-1 5000 m
Silver medal – second place	2018 Belgrade	K-1 5000 m
Silver medal – second place	2021 Poznań	K-1 1000 m
Silver medal – second place	2022 Munich	K-1 1000 m
Silver medal – second place	2024 Szeged	K-1 500 m
Bronze medal – third place	2010 Trasona	K-2 500 m
Bronze medal – third place	2011 Belgrade	K-1 1000 m
Bronze medal – third place	2014 Brandenburg	K-1 5000 m
Bronze medal – third place	2014 Brandenburg	K-4 1000 m
Bronze medal – third place	2015 Račice	K-1 1000 m
Bronze medal – third place	2018 Belgrade	K-1 500 m
Bronze medal – third place	2021 Poznań	K-1 5000 m
Bronze medal – third place	2022 Munich	K-1 500 m
Bronze medal – third place	2024 Szeged	K-1 1000 m
Bronze medal – third place	2026 Montemor-o-Velho	K-1 1000 m
European Games
Silver medal – second place	2015 Baku	K-1 1000 m
Silver medal – second place	2015 Baku	K-1 5000 m
Silver medal – second place	2019 Minsk	K-1 1000 m
Silver medal – second place	2019 Minsk	K-1 5000 m
Silver medal – second place	2023 Kraków-Małopolska	K-1 500 m
Mediterranean Games
Silver medal – second place	2018 Taragona	K-1 500 m
Universiade
Gold medal – first place	2013 Kazan	K-1 500 m
Gold medal – first place	2013 Kazan	K-1 1000 m
Men's canoe marathon
World Championships
Gold medal – first place	2022 Ponte de Lima	K-1 short race
Gold medal – first place	2022 Ponte de Lima	K-2
Gold medal – first place	2023 Vejen	K-1 short race
Gold medal – first place	2023 Vejen	K-2
Gold medal – first place	2024 Metković	K-2
Gold medal – first place	2025 Győr	K-1 short race
Gold medal – first place	2025 Győr	K-2
Bronze medal – third place	2012 Rome	K-1
European Championships
Gold medal – first place	2025 Ponte de Lima	K-1 short race
Gold medal – first place	2025 Ponte de Lima	K-2

Fernando Ismael Fernandes Pimenta GOIH ComM (Portuguese pronunciation: [fɨɾˈnɐ̃du piˈmẽtɐ], born 13 August 1989) is a Portuguese sprint canoeist who has won multiple medals at the Olympic Games, World and European championships. At club level, he represents Benfica.

== Career ==
Pimenta has competed since the late 2000s. His first major result came at the 2010 World Championships in Poznań, Poland, when he won the K-2 500 metres silver medal together with João Ribeiro. One year later, he contributed to the Portuguese K-4 1000 metres gold medal at the European Championships in Belgrade, Serbia, and claimed a bronze in the K-1 1000 metres. Together with Emanuel Silva, he won the silver medal in the K-2 1000 metres event at the 2012 Summer Olympics in London, which was Portugal's only medal at these Games.

In 2013, Pimenta won multiple medals in international events, namely two silvers (K-1 5000 metres and K-4 1000 metres) at the European Championships, held in Portugal's Montemor-o-Velho racing course, and two golds (K-1 500 and 1000 metres) at the Summer Universiade in Kazan. The following year, he secured his second world championship medal in Moscow, after a runner-up finish in the K-4 1000 metres event. At the European Championships in Brandenburg, Germany, Pimenta finished again in the top-three places of the K-1 5000 and K-4 1000 metres, taking a bronze medal in both events.

Pimenta participated in the inaugural edition of the European Games, in Baku, Azerbaijan, where he became the first Portuguese sprint canoeist to win a medal in this competition, after finishing second in the K-1 1000 metres event; a day later, he added another silver medal in the K-1 5000 metres. At the World Championships in Milan, Pimenta won the K-1 1000 metres bronze medal – his third medal at this level – and secured his country's qualification for this event at the 2016 Summer Olympics in Rio de Janeiro.

In 2016, Pimenta won his first individual continental titles after taking the K-1 1000 and 5000 metres gold medals at the European Championships in Moscow. At the Olympics, he missed the medal places, finishing 5th and 6th in the K-1 1000 metres and K-4 1000 metres finals, respectively. The following year in July, he defended his European K-1 1000 metres title in Plovdiv, but lost the K-1 5000 metres crown to his German rival Max Hoff. However, the following month, Pimenta would beat Hoff in a sprint finish for the K-1 5000 metres gold medal at the World Championships in Račice, to win his first individual world title. On 5 March 2018, he moved from Clube Náutico de Ponte de Lima to S.L. Benfica.

At the 2020 Tokyo Olympics, Pimenta won his heat, earning direct access to the semi-final which he also won with an Olympic Record. During the 3 August 2021 final, Pimenta won the bronze medal with faster time than in the previous round.

== Major results ==
=== Olympics ===
Year	K-1 1000	K-2 200	K-2 1000	K-4 1000
2012		DNS H	2nd place, silver medalist(s)	
2016	5			6
2020	3rd place, bronze medalist(s)	—N/a		—N/a
2024	6	—N/a	—N/a	—N/a

=== World championships ===
Year	K-1 500	K-1 1000	K-1 5000	K-2 500	K-2 1000	K-4 1000	XK-2 500	XK-4 500	K–1 4 × 200
2010				2nd place, silver medalist(s)	7		—N/a	—N/a	4 H
2011		8	7			2 FB	—N/a	—N/a	
2014		1 FB				2nd place, silver medalist(s)	—N/a	—N/a	
2015		3rd place, bronze medalist(s)				5	—N/a	—N/a	—N/a
2017		2nd place, silver medalist(s)	1st place, gold medalist(s)				—N/a	—N/a	—N/a
2018		1st place, gold medalist(s)	1st place, gold medalist(s)				—N/a	—N/a	—N/a
2019	6 H	3rd place, bronze medalist(s)	3rd place, bronze medalist(s)				—N/a	—N/a	—N/a
2021		1st place, gold medalist(s)	2nd place, silver medalist(s)			—N/a	—N/a	—N/a	—N/a
2022	3rd place, bronze medalist(s)	2nd place, silver medalist(s)	DNF			—N/a	2nd place, silver medalist(s)	—N/a	—N/a
2023	3rd place, bronze medalist(s)	1st place, gold medalist(s)	2nd place, silver medalist(s)			—N/a		—N/a	—N/a
2024	2nd place, silver medalist(s)	—N/a	2nd place, silver medalist(s)	—N/a		—N/a		DSQ	—N/a
2025	4	3rd place, bronze medalist(s)	6		—N/a	—N/a	—N/a	—N/a	—N/a
2026		1st place, gold medalist(s)	1st place, gold medalist(s)		—N/a	—N/a	—N/a	—N/a	—N/a

== Orders ==
- Grand Officer of the Order of Prince Henry
- Commander of the Order of Merit
