= Joakim Lindberg =

Swedish canoeist (born 1993)

Personal information
- Born: 21 August 1993 (age 33) Finspång, Sweden

Sport
- Country: Sweden
- Sport: Sprint kayak
- Events: K-1 5000 m, K-2 1000 m
- Club: Finspångs Kanotklubb
Medal record
Men's canoe sprint
Representing Sweden
World Championships
Gold medal – first place	2022 Dartmouth	K-1 5000 m
Silver medal – second place	2024 Samarkand	K-2 1000 m
Bronze medal – third place	2024 Samarkand	K-1 5000 m

Joakim Lindberg (born 21 August 1993) is a Swedish canoeist. He is the 2022 ICF Canoe Sprint World Championships gold medalist in the K-1 5000 metres.

== Career ==
Lindberg represented Sweden at the 2019 European Games. He competed at the 2022 ICF Canoe Sprint World Championships and won a gold medal in the K-1 5000 metres event with a time of 21:34.26.

He represented Sweden at the 2023 European Games and finished in ninth place in the K-2 500 metres and K-4 500 metres events.

He competed at the 2024 ICF Canoe Sprint World Championships and won a silver medal in the K-2 1000 metres event with Martin Nathell. They had the fastest time during the heats.

== Major results ==
=== World championships ===
Year	K-1 1000	K-1 5000	K-2 500	K-2 1000	K-4 1000
2015		DNF		1 FC	8 SF
2019	6 FB	4			
2022		1st place, gold medalist(s)			—N/a
2023		5	4 FB		—N/a
2024	—N/a	3rd place, bronze medalist(s)		2nd place, silver medalist(s)	—N/a
2025		DNS		—N/a	—N/a
