= Yusuke Miyata =

Japanese canoeist

Personal information
- Nationality: Japanese
- Born: 21 May 1991 (age 34)

Sport
- Sport: Canoe sprint

Yusuke Miyata (宮田 悠佑, Miyata Yūsuke, born 21 May 1991) is a Japanese canoeist. He competed in the men's K-4 500 metres event at the 2020 Summer Olympics.
