= Bálint Kopasz =

Hungarian canoeist (born 1997)

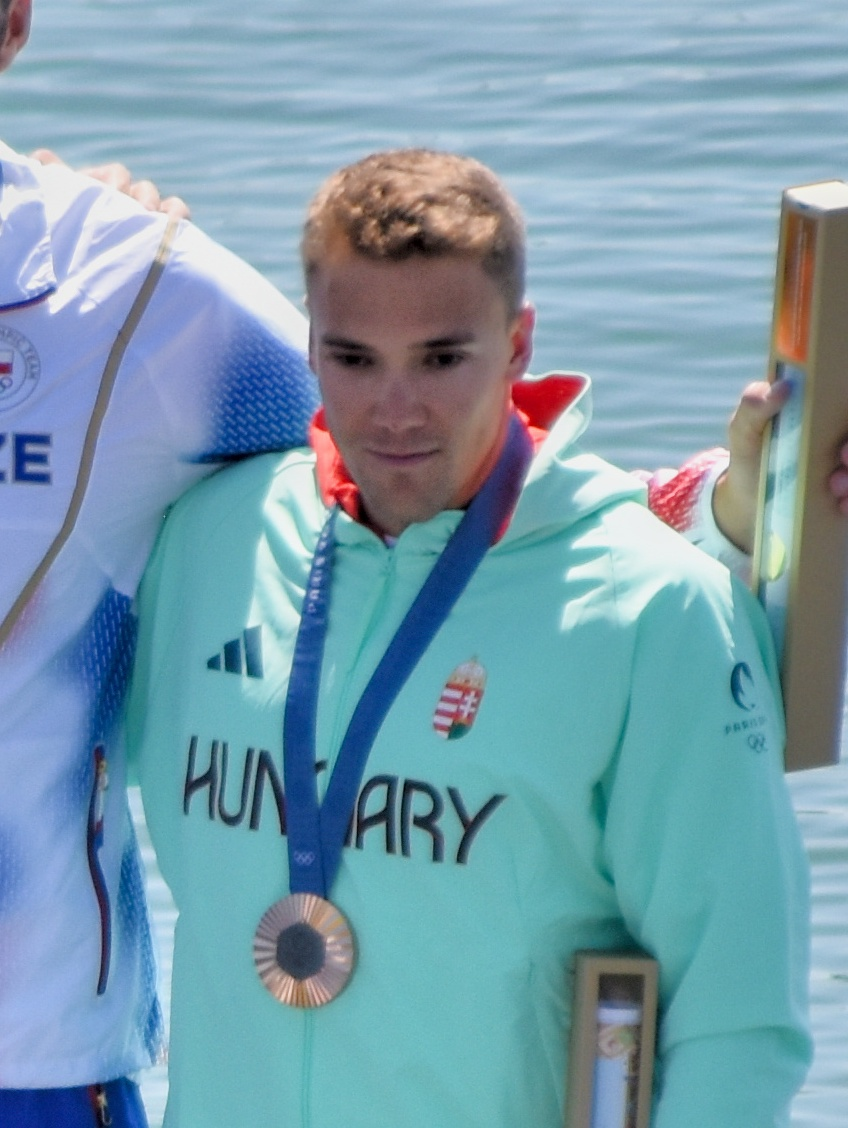
- Kopasz in 2024

Personal information
- Nationality: Hungarian
- Born: 20 June 1997 (age 29) Szeged, Hungary
- Height: 1.81 m (5 ft 11 in)
- Weight: 72 kg (159 lb)

Sport
- Country: Hungary
- Sport: Sprint kayak
- Club: Algyői VE; Győri VSE
Medal record
Men's sprint kayak
Representing Hungary
Olympic Games
Gold medal – first place	2020 Tokyo	K-1 1000 m
Bronze medal – third place	2024 Paris	K-1 1000 m
World Championships
Gold medal – first place	2019 Szeged	K-1 1000 m
Gold medal – first place	2022 Dartmouth	K-1 1000 m
Gold medal – first place	2022 Dartmouth	K-2 500 m
Gold medal – first place	2023 Duisburg	K-1 500 m
Gold medal – first place	2025 Milan	K-1 1000 m
Silver medal – second place	2021 Copenhagen	K-1 1000 m
Silver medal – second place	2023 Duisburg	K-2 500 m
Silver medal – second place	2026 Poznań	K-1 1000 m
European Championships
Gold medal – first place	2021 Poznań	K-1 500 m
Gold medal – first place	2021 Poznań	K-1 1000 m
Gold medal – first place	2022 Munich	K-1 1000 m
Gold medal – first place	2022 Munich	K-2 500m
Silver medal – second place	2018 Belgrade	K-1 1000 m
Silver medal – second place	2024 Szeged	K-1 1000 m
Silver medal – second place	2026 Montemor-o-Velho	K-1 1000 m
Bronze medal – third place	2016 Moscow	K-1 1000 m
Bronze medal – third place	2017 Plovdiv	K-1 500 m
Bronze medal – third place	2017 Plovdiv	K-1 1000 m
Bronze medal – third place	2025 Racice	K-1 1000 m
European Games
Gold medal – first place	2019 Minsk	K-1 1000 m
Gold medal – first place	2019 Minsk	K-1 5000 m

Bálint Kopasz (born 20 June 1997) is a Hungarian sprint canoeist. He competed in the men's K-1 1000 metres event at the 2016 Summer Olympics. He won the same event in the 2020 Summer Olympics and later claimed bronze at the 2024 Summer Olympics.

== Major results ==
=== Olympics ===
Year	K-1 1000	K-2 500	K-2 1000
2016	2 FB	—N/a	
2020	1st place, gold medalist(s)	—N/a	4
2024	3rd place, bronze medalist(s)	7 FB	—N/a

=== World championships ===
Year	K-1 500	K-1 1000	K-2 500	K-4 500
2017	1 FB	5		
2018		4		
2019		1st place, gold medalist(s)		
2021		2nd place, silver medalist(s)	4	9
2022		1st place, gold medalist(s)	1st place, gold medalist(s)	
2023	1st place, gold medalist(s)		2nd place, silver medalist(s)	
2025	1st place, gold medalist(s)			
2026		2nd place, silver medalist(s)		
