= Thomas Green (canoeist) =

Australian canoeist (born 1999)

Thomas Green OAM
Personal information
- Full name: Thomas Anthony Green
- Born: 3 June 1999 (age 27) Queensland, Australia
- Height: 1.92 m (6 ft 4 in)
Medal record
Men's canoe sprint
Representing Australia
Olympic Games
Gold medal – first place	2020 Tokyo	K-2 1000m
Bronze medal – third place	2024 Paris	K-2 500 m
World Championships
Gold medal – first place	2026 Poznań	K-1 500 m
Silver medal – second place	2025 Milan	K-1 1000 m
Bronze medal – third place	2022 Dartmouth	K-2 500 m
Bronze medal – third place	2026 Poznań	K-1 1000 m

Thomas Anthony Green OAM (born 3 June 1999) is an Australian sprint canoeist. He won a gold medal in the K2 1000 metres event at the 2020 Summer Olympics, competing alongside Jean van der Westhuyzen. He also competed in the K1 1000 metres, finishing in seventh place.

== Career ==
In 2018, he won the K2 1000m with Joel McKitterick at the World Under 23 Championships in Plovdiv, Bulgaria and followed it up with wins in the 2019 Championships in Pitesti, Romania in the Under 23 K1 1000m and K4 500m events.

Green was only 10 years old when he started kayaking at the Currumbin Creek Canoe Club. He was encouraged to concentrate on flat-water paddling. He competed at the Australian Canoe Sprint Championships, winning eleven medals, three of which were gold medals.

In the 2022 Australia Day Honours Green was awarded the Medal of the Order of Australia.
