= Andrea Schera =

Italian canoeist

Personal information
- Born: 1 September 1997 (age 29) Palermo, Italy

Sport
- Sport: Canoe
- Event: Canoe sprint
- Club: G.S. Fiamme Gialle
- Coached by: Antonio Scaduto
Medal record
Canoe sprint
Representing Italy
Event	1st	2nd	3rd
World Championships	0	1	0
European Championships	0	0	1
Total	0	1	1
World Championships
Silver medal – second place	2022 Halifax	K2 1000 m
European Championships
Gold medal – first place	2024 Szeged	K-2 1000 m
Bronze medal – third place	2022 Munich	K2 1000 m

Andrea Schera (born 1 September 1997) is an Italian sprint canoeist who won medals at senior level between World Championships and European Championships.
