= Samuele Burgo =

Italian canoeist (born 1998)

Personal information
- Nationality: Italian
- Born: 20 March 1998 (age 28) Syracuse, Italy

Sport
- Sport: Canoe sprint
Medal record
World Championships
Silver medal – second place	2022 Dartmouth	K-2 1000 m
European Championships
Gold medal – first place	2024 Szeged	K-2 1000 m
Bronze medal – third place	2022 Munich	K-2 1000 m
Bronze medal – third place	2025 Racice	K-2 500 m

Samuele Burgo (born 20 March 1998) is an Italian canoeist. He competed in the men's K-1 1000 metres event at the 2020 Summer Olympics.
