= Aleh Yurenia =

Belarusian canoeist

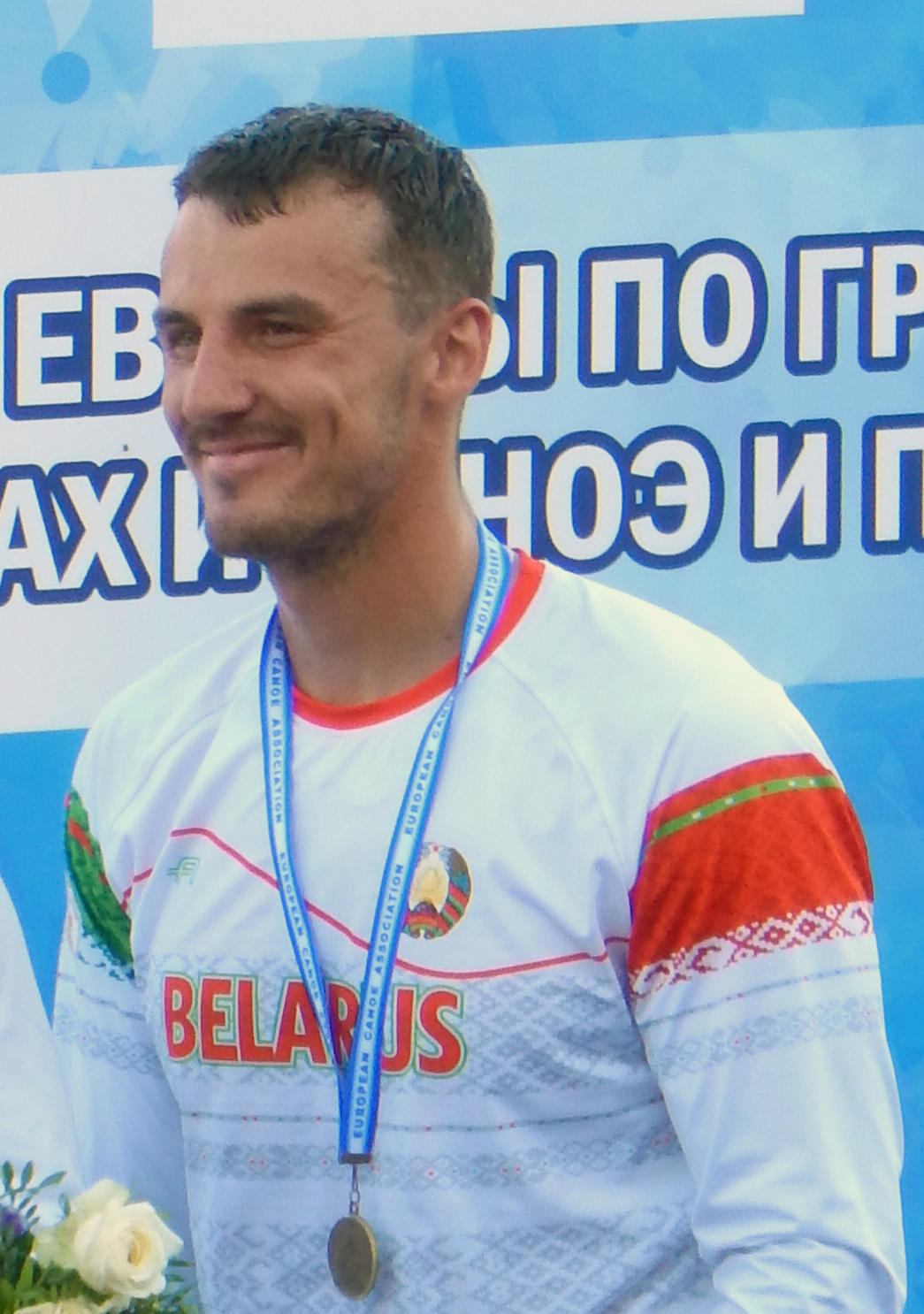
- Yurenia in 2016

Personal information
- Full name: Aleh Alehavich Yurenia
- Nationality: Belarusian
- Born: 21 May 1990 (age 36) Slonim, Belarus
- Height: 1.88 m (6 ft 2 in)
- Weight: 90 kg (198 lb)

Sport
- Country: Belarus
- Sport: Sprint kayak
- Club: Dinamo Sports Club
Medal record
Men's sprint kayak
Representing Belarus
World Championships
| Gold medal – first place | 2019 Szeged | K-1 5000 m |
| Gold medal – first place | 2024 Samarkand | K-2 1000 m |
| Silver medal – second place | 2011 Szeged | K-1 5000 m |
| Silver medal – second place | 2013 Duisburg | K-2 1000 m |
| Bronze medal – third place | 2010 Poznań | K-1 1000 m |
| Bronze medal – third place | 2015 Milan | K-1 5000 m |
| Bronze medal – third place | 2017 Račice | K-1 5000 m |
| Bronze medal – third place | 2021 Copenhagen | K-1 1000 m |
European Games
| Bronze medal – third place | 2015 Baku | K-4 1000 m |
| Bronze medal – third place | 2019 Minsk | K-1 1000 m |
European Championships
| Gold medal – first place | 2010 Trasona | K-1 5000 m |
| Gold medal – first place | 2011 Belgrade | K-1 5000 m |
| Gold medal – first place | 2012 Zagreb | K-1 5000 m |
| Gold medal – first place | 2014 Brandenburg | K-1 1000 m |
| Gold medal – first place | 2024 Szeged | K-1 1000 m |
| Silver medal – second place | 2010 Trasona | K-1 1000 m |
| Silver medal – second place | 2011 Belgrade | K-1 1000 m |
| Silver medal – second place | 2021 Poznań | K-1 5000 m |
| Bronze medal – third place | 2015 Račice | K-1 5000 m |
| Bronze medal – third place | 2016 Moscow | K-1 5000 m |
| Bronze medal – third place | 2016 Moscow | K-2 1000 m |
Representing ANA
World Championships
| Gold medal – first place | 2024 Samarkand | K-2 1000 m |
European Championships
| Gold medal – first place | 2024 Szeged | K-1 1000 m |

Aleh Alehavich Yurenia (Belarusian: Алег Алегавіч Юрэня; born 21 May 1990) is a Belarusian sprint canoeist who has competed since the late 2000s.

== Career ==
He has won eight World Championships medals, including two gold medals in 2019 and 2024

In June 2015, he competed in the inaugural European Games, for Belarus in canoe sprint, in the Men's K-4 1000m with Raman Piatrushenka, Pavel Miadzvedzeu, and Vitaliy Bialko. He earned a bronze medal.

== Major results ==
=== Olympics ===
| Year | K-1 1000 | K-2 1000 |
|---|---|---|
| 2012 | 6 | |
| 2020 | 4 FB | 7 |

=== World championships ===
| Year | K-1 500 | K-1 1000 | K-1 5000 | K-2 1000 | K-4 1000 |
|---|---|---|---|---|---|
| 2010 | 8 | 3rd place, bronze medalist(s) | 4 | | |
| 2011 | | 5 | 2nd place, silver medalist(s) | | |
| 2013 | | | 6 | 2nd place, silver medalist(s) | 6 |
| 2014 | | | | 8 | 7 |
| 2015 | | 5 | 3rd place, bronze medalist(s) | | |
| 2017 | | 4 | 3rd place, bronze medalist(s) | | |
| 2018 | | | DSQ | 8 | 5 |
| 2019 | | 6 | 1st place, gold medalist(s) | | |
| 2021 | | 3rd place, bronze medalist(s) | 4 | | —N/a |
| 2024 | | —N/a | DNF | 1st place, gold medalist(s) | —N/a |
| 2025 | | | 8 | —N/a | —N/a |
