= Francisco Cubelos =

Spanish canoeist (born 1992)

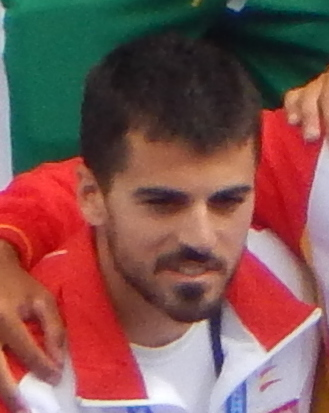

Personal information
- Full name: Francisco Cubelos Sánchez
- Nationality: Spanish
- Born: 8 October 1992 (age 33) Talavera de la Reina, Spain
- Height: 1.70 m (5 ft 7 in)
- Weight: 71 kg (157 lb)

Sport
- Country: Spain
- Sport: Sprint kayak
- Events: K-2 1000 m, K-4 1000 m
- Club: Talavera Talak
Medal record
Men's canoe sprint
Representing Spain
World Championships
Silver medal – second place	2018 Montemor-o-Velho	K-2 1000 m
Silver medal – second place	2019 Szeged	K-2 1000 m
Bronze medal – third place	2018 Montemor-o-Velho	K-4 1000 m
Bronze medal – third place	2022 Dartmouth	K-1 5000 m
European Championships
Gold medal – first place	2017 Plovdiv	K-4 1000 m
Silver medal – second place	2022 Munich	K-2 1000 m
Silver medal – second place	2022 Munich	K-4 1000 m
Bronze medal – third place	2012 Zagreb	K-1 1000 m
Bronze medal – third place	2016 Moscow	K-4 500 m
Bronze medal – third place	2017 Plovdiv	K-2 1000 m
Bronze medal – third place	2018 Belgrade	K-2 1000 m

Francisco Cubelos Sánchez (Note: In this Spanish name, the first or paternal surname is Cubelos and the second or maternal family name is Sánchez.) (born 8 October 1992) is a Spanish sprint canoeist. At the 2012 Summer Olympics, he competed in the Men's K-1 1000 metres. He finished in 7th place in the final.
