= Miroslav Kirchev =

Bulgarian canoeist (born 1990)

Personal information
- Born: 12 June 1990 (age 36) Ruse, Bulgaria
Medal record
Men's canoe sprint
Representing Bulgaria
World Championships
Silver medal – second place	2014 Moscow	K-1 1000 m
European Championships
Bronze medal – third place	2014 Brandenburg	K-1 500 m

Miroslav Kirchev (born 12 June 1990) is a Bulgarian sprint canoeist. At the 2012 Summer Olympics, he competed in the Men's K-1 1000 metres, finishing in 11th place. He competed in the same event at the 2016 Olympics, finishing in 19th place.
