= Martin Nathell =

Swedish canoeist (born 1995)

Personal information
- Born: 18 January 1995 (age 31) Ängelholm, Sweden

Sport
- Country: Sweden
- Sport: Sprint kayak
- Events: K-1 1000 m, K-2 1000 m
- Club: Ängelholms Rowing and Canoeing Club
Medal record
Men's canoe sprint
Representing Sweden
World Championships
Gold medal – first place	2021 Copenhagen	K-2 1000 m
Silver medal – second place	2024 Samarkand	K-2 1000 m
European Championships
Silver medal – second place	2025 Racice	K-1 1000 m

Martin Nathell (born 18 January 1995) is a Swedish canoeist. He represented Sweden at the 2024 Summer Olympics.

== Career ==
Nathell competed at the 2021 ICF Canoe Sprint World Championships and won a gold medal in the K-2 1000 metres event. He competed at the 2023 ICF Canoe Sprint World Championships in the K-1 1000 metres event and finished in eighth place. As a result, he qualified for the 2024 Summer Olympics.

He competed at the 2024 ICF Canoe Sprint World Championships and won a silver medal in the K-2 1000 metres event with Joakim Lindberg. They had the fastest time during the heats.

== Major results ==
=== Olympic Games ===
Year	K-1 1000
2024	7

=== World championships ===
Year	K-1 500	K-1 1000	K-1 5000	K-2 500	K-2 1000	K-4 500	K-4 1000	XK-2 500	XK-4 500
2013				8 SF	8 SF	—N/a		—N/a	—N/a
2015		2 FC				—N/a	8 SF	—N/a	—N/a
2017	7 FB	5 FB	12					—N/a	—N/a
2018		5 FB	13		2 FB			—N/a	—N/a
2019					6 FB	7 SF		—N/a	—N/a
2021			12	9	1st place, gold medalist(s)		—N/a	—N/a	—N/a
2022		1 FB		7 SF			—N/a		—N/a
2023		8		4 FB			—N/a		—N/a
2024		—N/a		—N/a	2nd place, silver medalist(s)	—N/a	—N/a	8	9
2025		4 FB			—N/a		—N/a	—N/a	—N/a
2026		8	9	7 FB	—N/a		—N/a	—N/a	—N/a
