= Agustín Vernice =

Argentine canoeist (born 1995)

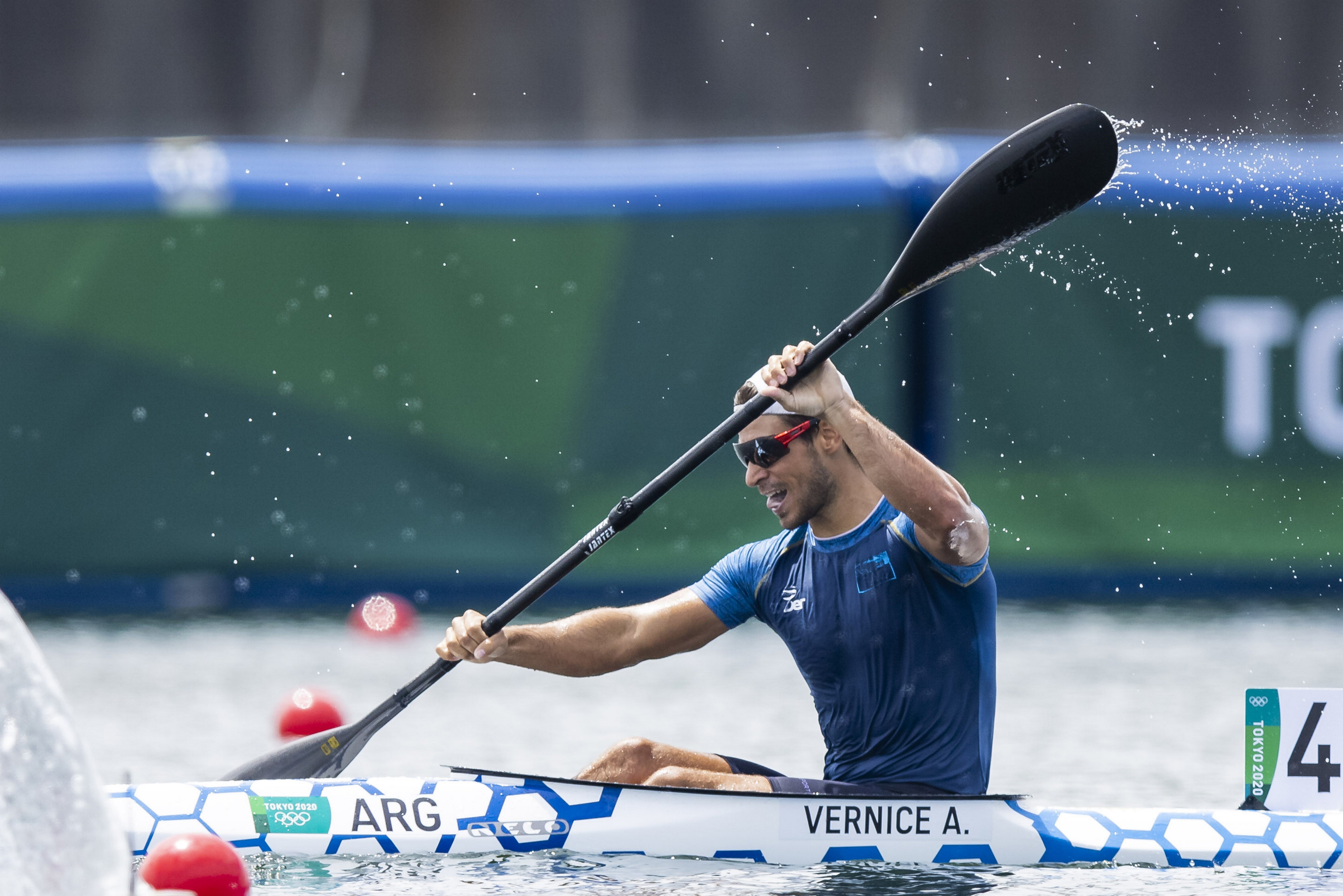
- Vernice in the K-1 1000 m at the 2020 Summer Olympics

Personal information
- Born: 3 July 1995 (age 31) Bahia Blanca
Medal record
Men's canoe sprint
Representing Argentina
Pan American Games
Gold medal – first place	2019 Lima	K–1 1000 m
Gold medal – first place	2019 Lima	K–2 1000 m
Gold medal – first place	2023 Santiago	K-1 1000 m
Gold medal – first place	2023 Santiago	K-4 500 m
Silver medal – second place	2023 Santiago	K-2 500 m
South American Games
Gold medal – first place	2026 Santa Fe	K-1 1000 m
Gold medal – first place	2026 Santa Fe	K-2 500 m
Gold medal – first place	2026 Santa Fe	K-4 500 m
Gold medal – first place	2026 Santa Fe	Mixed K-2 500 m

Agustín Vernice (born 3 July 1995 in Bahia Blanca) is an Argentine sprint canoeist. He qualified to compete for Argentina at the 2020 Summer Olympics in the men's K-1 1000 metres event.
