= Artuur Peters =

Belgian canoeist (born 1996)

Personal information
- Nationality: Belgian
- Born: 26 October 1996 (age 29) Hechtel-Eksel, Limburg, Belgium

Sport
- Country: Belgium
- Sport: Canoe sprint
- Events: K-1 500m, K-1 1000m
Medal record
European Championships
Bronze medal – third place	2021 Poznań	K-1 1000 m
Bronze medal – third place	2022 Munich	K-1 1000 m
World U23 Championships
Gold medal – first place	2016 Minsk	K-1 1000 m
Silver medal – second place	2017 Pitești	K-1 500 m
Silver medal – second place	2017 Pitești	K-1 1000 m
European U23 Championships
Gold medal – first place	2019 Račice	K-2 1000 m
Gold medal – first place	2018 Auronzo Lake	K-1 1000 m
Gold medal – first place	2015 Pitești	K-1 1000 m
Silver medal – second place	2018 Auronzo Lake	K-1 500 m
World Junior Championships
Gold medal – first place	2014 Szeged	K-1 1000 m
European Junior Championships
Silver medal – second place	2014 Mantes-en-Yvelines	K-1 500 m
Bronze medal – third place	2014 Mantes-en-Yvelines	K-1 1000 m

Artuur Peters (born 26 October 1996) is a Belgian canoeist. He competed in the men's K-1 1000 metres event at the 2016, 2020 and 2024 Summer Olympics .

His older sister is Hermien Peters who also competed in the canoeing competitions at the same Summer Olympics.

== Career ==
Peters is a former K1 1000 metres junior and U23 world champion, winning the gold medal at the 2014 ICF World Junior Canoe Sprint Championships in Szeged, Hungary, resp. the 2016 ICF World U23 Canoe Sprint Championships in Minsk, Belarus.

Peters is a former K1 1000 metres double U23 European champion, winning the gold medal at the 2015 European U23 Canoe Sprint Championships in Pitești, Romania, and again at the 2018 European Junior and U23 Canoe Sprint Championships in Auronzo di Cadore, Italy.

Peters is also a former K2 1000 metres U23 European champion. having teamed up with Bram Sikkens winning the gold medal at the 2019 European U23 Canoe Sprint Championships in Račice, Czech Republic.
