= René Holten Poulsen =

Danish canoeist (born 1988)

René Poulsen
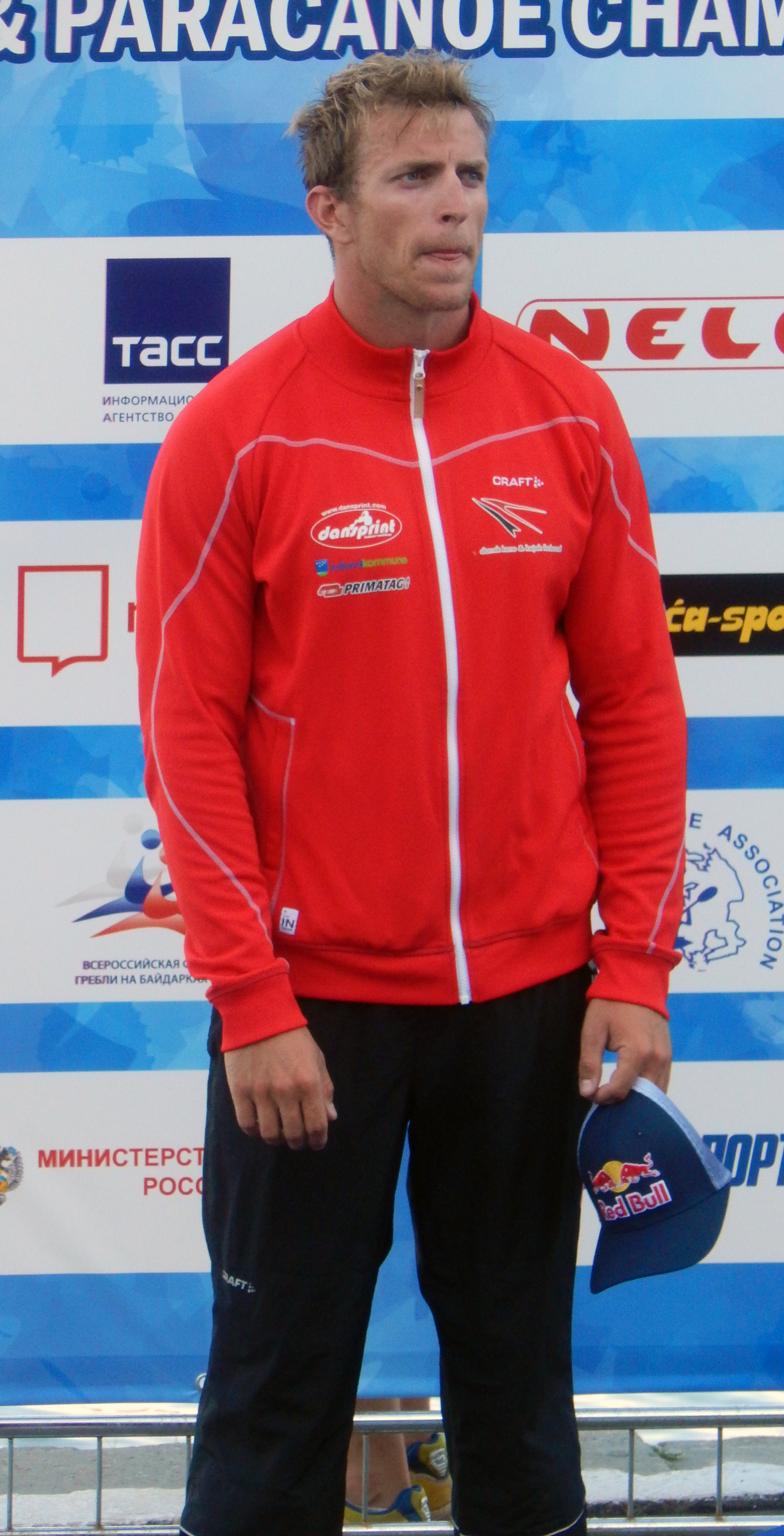
- Poulsen at the 2016 European Championships

Personal information
- Full name: René Holten Poulsen
- Nationality: Danish
- Born: 28 November 1988 (age 37) Sakskøbing, Denmark
- Height: 1.88 m (6 ft 2 in)
- Weight: 92 kg (203 lb)

Sport
- Sport: Kayaking
- Events: K-1 1,000m, K-1 500m, K-2 1,000m
- Club: Maribo Kajakklub
Medal record
Event	1st	2nd	3rd
Olympic Games	0	1	0
World Championships	3	3	1
European Championships	6	9	5
European Games	0	0	1
Total	9	13	7
Men's canoe sprint
Representing Denmark
Olympic Games
Silver medal – second place	2008 Beijing	K-2 1000 m
World Championships
Gold medal – first place	2014 Moscow	K–1 500 m
Gold medal – first place	2015 Milan	K–1 1000 m
Gold medal – first place	2015 Milan	K–1 500 m
Silver medal – second place	2013 Duisburg	K–1 500 m
Silver medal – second place	2017 Račice	K-1 500 m
Silver medal – second place	2018 Montemor-o-Velho	K-1 5000 m
Bronze medal – third place	2014 Moscow	K–1 1000 m
European Championships
Gold medal – first place	2008 Milan	K-2 1000 m
Gold medal – first place	2012 Zagreb	K-4 1000 m
Gold medal – first place	2013 Montemor-o-Velho	K-1 500 m
Gold medal – first place	2013 Montemor-o-Velho	K-1 1000 m
Gold medal – first place	2015 Racice	K-1 500 m
Gold medal – first place	2015 Racice	K-1 5000 m
Silver medal – second place	2012 Zagreb	K-1 1000 m
Silver medal – second place	2014 Brandenburg	K-1 500 m
Silver medal – second place	2014 Brandenburg	K-1 1000 m
Silver medal – second place	2014 Brandenburg	K-1 5000 m
Silver medal – second place	2015 Racice	K-1 1000 m
Silver medal – second place	2016 Moscow	K-1 500 m
Silver medal – second place	2016 Moscow	K-1 1000 m
Silver medal – second place	2016 Moscow	K-1 5000 m
Silver medal – second place	2017 Plovdiv	K-1 1000 m
Bronze medal – third place	2009 Brandenburg	K-1 1000 m
Bronze medal – third place	2010 Trasona	K-1 1000 m
Bronze medal – third place	2011 Belgrade	K-1 5000 m
Bronze medal – third place	2013 Montemor-o-Velho	K-1 5000 m
Bronze medal – third place	2017 Plovdiv	K-1 500 m
European Games
Bronze medal – third place	2015 Baku	K-1 1000 m

René Holten Poulsen (born 28 November 1988) is a Danish sprint canoeist, who has won medals at the Olympics, World Championships and European Championships. He won a silver medal in the men's K-2 1000 metres at the 2008 Summer Olympics.

He made his international debut in 2005, having begun paddling at the age of 12.

The Dane has won medals in various sprint events, but has primarily focused on the K-1 since 2009. He has won 5 world championships medals and was crowned double world champion in 2015 in Milan, winning both the K-1 1.000 meter and K-1 500 meter, only the sixth time this double has been won. He has one medal from the Olympic Games and 15 from European championships. In June 2015, he competed in the inaugural European Games, for Denmark in canoe sprint, more specifically, Men's K-1 1000m. He earned a bronze medal. He was also an ambassador for the 2015 European Games.

For his 2015 achievements, he has been nominated for both the World Paddle Awards 2015 and as the Sportsperson of the Year 2015 in Denmark. He won both awards.

== Major results ==
=== Olympics ===
Year	K-1 1000	K-2 500	K-2 1000	K-4 1000
2008		5	2nd place, silver medalist(s)	
2012	4	—N/a		5
2016	6	—N/a		
2024	8 FB		—N/a	—N/a

=== World championships ===
Year	K-1 500	K-1 1000	K-1 5000	K-2 500	K-2 1000	K-4 1000
2007			—N/a		2 FB	
2009	8	9	—N/a			
2010		4				
2011		1 FB	19			9
2013	2nd place, silver medalist(s)	5				
2014	1st place, gold medalist(s)	3rd place, bronze medalist(s)				
2015	1st place, gold medalist(s)	1st place, gold medalist(s)	4		DSQ	
2017	2nd place, silver medalist(s)	8	16	8		
2018		8	2nd place, silver medalist(s)		5	
2019		4 FC	21		1 FB	
2021		7		7		—N/a
2022		2 FB		2 FB		—N/a
2023		1 FB				—N/a
