= Jošt Zakrajšek =

Slovenian canoeist

Personal information
- Nationality: Slovenian
- Born: 26 June 1983 (age 43) Kranj, Slovenia

Sport
- Sport: Canoeing
- Events: Canoe sprint; Canoe slalom; Canoe marathon; Wildwater canoeing

Jošt Zakrajšek (born 26 June 1983) is a Slovenian male canoeist who won a Wildwater Canoeing World Cup in C1.

== Biography ==
In addition to having won a World Cup in wildwater, he has participated in the world or European championships in all four disciplines of canoeing (winning medals in three of these), slalom and wildwater in whitewater and sprint and marathon in flatwater, in addition to competing with both canoe, Canadian and kayak.

== Achievements ==
Year	Competition	Venue	Position	Event	Time	Notes
Canoe slalom
2004	European Championships	(North Macedonia) Skopje	3rd	C1 team	234.86 pts	
Wildwater canoeing
2002	World Championships	(Italy) Valsesia	3rd	C1 classic team	9:46.38	
2008	World Championships	(Italy) Ivrea	2nd	C1 sprint	2:13.71	
2009	European Championships	(Italy) Valtellina	3rd	C1 classic	14:50.08	
2010	World Championships	(Spain) Noguera River	3rd	C1 classic	20:42.86	
Canoe sprint
2013	Mediterranean Games	(Turkey) Mersin	2nd	K1 1000 m	3:32.247	
2013	European Championships	(Portugal) Montemor	4th	K1 1000 m	3:29.475	
2019	World Championships	(Hungary) Szeged	5th	K1 5000 m	20:21.46	
Canoe marathon
2016	World Championships	(Germany) Brandenburg	28th	K1 29,800 m	2:31:25.890	
