= 2017 ICF Canoe Sprint World Championships – Men's K-4 500 metres =

Men's K-4 500 metres at the 2017 ICF Canoe Sprint World Championships
- Venue: Sportcentrum Račice
- Location: Račice, Czech Republic
- Dates: 25–27 August
- Competitors: 116 from 29 nations
- Winning time: 1:17.734 WB

Medalists
gold medal	Tom Liebscher; Ronald Rauhe; Max Rendschmidt; Max Lemke	Germany
silver medal	Rodrigo Germade; Cristian Toro; Carlos Garrote; Marcus Walz	Spain
bronze medal	Daniel Havel; Jan Štěrba; Jakub Špicar; Radek Šlouf	Czech Republic

The men's K-4 500 metres competition at the 2017 ICF Canoe Sprint World Championships in Račice took place at the Sportcentrum Račice.

== Schedule ==
The schedule was as follows:

Date	Time	Round
Friday 25 August 2017	11:50	Heats
Saturday 26 August 2017	16:49	Semifinals
Sunday 27 August 2017	09:37	Final B
Sunday 27 August 2017	11:53	Final A

All times are Central European Summer Time (UTC+2)

== Results ==
=== Heats ===
The six fastest boats in each heat, plus the three fastest remaining boats advanced to the semifinals.

==== Heat 1 ====
Rank	Kayakers	Country	Time	Notes
1	Tom Liebscher; Ronald Rauhe; Max Rendschmidt; Max Lemke	Germany	1:20.355	QS
2	Raman Piatrushenka; Dzmitry Tratsiakou; Mikita Borykau; Vitaliy Bialko	Belarus	1:21.510	QS
3	Maxence Beauchesne; Ryan Cochrane; Marshall Hughes; Pierre-Luc Poulin	Canada	1:21.644	QS
4	Aurimas Lankas; Mindaugas Maldonis; Edvinas Ramanauskas; Simonas Maldonis	Lithuania	1:21.860	QS
5	Omar de Andrés; Juan Ignacio Cáceres; Pablo de Torres; Manuel Lascano	Argentina	1:21.872	QS
6	Deniss Volkovs; Kaspars Tiklenieks; Roberts Akmens; Aldis Arturs Vilde	Latvia	1:22.505	QS
7	Ali Aghamirzaei; Ahmad Reza Talebian; Babak Darban; Peyman Ghavidel Siah Sofiani	Iran	1:24.227	qS
8	Emil Noe; Orion Pilo; Troels Lund; Mads Brandt Petersen	Denmark	1:26.305	qS

==== Heat 2 ====
Rank	Kayakers	Country	Time	Notes
1	Daniel Havel; Jan Štěrba; Jakub Špicar; Radek Šlouf	Czech Republic	1:19.921	QS
2	Yury Postrigay; Vitaly Ershov; Oleg Gusev; Vladislav Blintcov	Russia	1:19.971	QS
3	Denis Myšák; Erik Vlček; Juraj Tarr; Tibor Linka	Slovakia	1:20.010	QS
4	Sébastien Jouve; Guillaume Le Floch Decorchemont; Maxime Beaumont; Étienne Hubert	France	1:21.021	QS
5	Alessandro Gnecchi; Mauro Pra Floriani; Alberto Ricchetti; Mauro Crenna	Italy	1:21.271	QS
6	Martin Brzeziński; Bartosz Stabno; Rafał Rosolski; Dawid Putto	Poland	1:21.849	QS
7	Joel Elenius; David Kopp; Jhonny Blixt; Henrik Strand	Sweden	1:23.893	qS

==== Heat 3 ====
Rank	Kayakers	Country	Time	Notes
1	Dejan Pajić; Ervin Holpert; Stefan Vekić; Vladimir Torubarov	Serbia	1:20.761	QS
2	Bence Nádas; Sándor Tótka; Péter Molnár; Milán Mozgi	Hungary	1:21.344	QS
3	Cosmin Lulciuc; Aurelian Ciocan; Razvan Albisoru; Sorin Cical	Romania	1:21.994	QS
4	Emanuel Silva; João Ribeiro; David Fernandes; David Varela	Portugal	1:22.761	QS
5	Per Christian Wessel; Hakeem Teland; Lars Hjemdal; Fridtjof Falch	Norway	1:23.294	QS
6	Yavuz Selim Balci; Fahri Ayvaz; Mustafa Özmen; Engin Erkan	Turkey	1:25.399	QS
7	Choi Min-kyu; Song Kuong-ho; Park Juhyeon; Kim Ji-won	South Korea	1:29.972	

==== Heat 4 ====
Rank	Kayakers	Country	Time	Notes
1	Rodrigo Germade; Cristian Toro; Carlos Garrote; Marcus Walz	Spain	1:22.708	QS
2	Ivan Semykin; Kyrylo Cernomorov; Denys Lakmanov; Roman Skoryk	Ukraine	1:23.269	QS
3	Seiji Komatsu; Keiji Mizumoto; Momotaro Matsushita; Koyo Niioka	Japan	1:23.897	QS
4	Joseph Beevers; Lewis Fletcher; Stelian Naftanaila; Matthew Robinson	Great Britain	1:26.819	QS
5	Maksim Bondar; Kirill Bondar; Igor Dorofeev; Maksim Serditov	Kyrgyzstan	1:27.969	QS
6	Maizir Riyondra; Andri Sugiarto; Sutrisno Sutrisno; Tri Wahyu Buwono	Indonesia	1:29.803	QS
7	Zhang Yu; Li Fu; Yang Junling; Wu Minzhe	China	1:31.236	

=== Semifinals ===
Qualification in each semi was as follows:

The fastest three boats advanced to the A final.
The next three fastest boats advanced to the B final.

==== Semifinal 1 ====
Rank	Kayakers	Country	Time	Notes
1	Rodrigo Germade; Cristian Toro; Carlos Garrote; Marcus Walz	Spain	1:20.694	QA
2	Raman Piatrushenka; Dzmitry Tratsiakou; Mikita Borykau; Vitaliy Bialko	Belarus	1:21.200	QA
3	Daniel Havel; Jan Štěrba; Jakub Špicar; Radek Šlouf	Czech Republic	1:21.383	QA
4	Emanuel Silva; João Ribeiro; David Fernandes; David Varela	Portugal	1:21.433	QB
5	Cosmin Lulciuc; Aurelian Ciocan; Razvan Albisoru; Sorin Cical	Romania	1:22.216	QB
6	Martin Brzeziński; Bartosz Stabno; Rafał Rosolski; Dawid Putto	Poland	1:22.289	QB
7	Deniss Volkovs; Kaspars Tiklenieks; Roberts Akmens; Aldis Arturs Vilde	Latvia	1:22.416	
8	Joel Elenius; David Kopp; Jhonny Blixt; Henrik Strand	Sweden	1:23.855	
9	Maksim Bondar; Kirill Bondar; Igor Dorofeev; Maksim Serditov	Kyrgyzstan	1:29.172	

==== Semifinal 2 ====
Rank	Kayakers	Country	Time	Notes
1	Sébastien Jouve; Guillaume Le Floch Decorchemont; Maxime Beaumont; Étienne Hubert	France	1:20.842	QA
2	Dejan Pajić; Ervin Holpert; Stefan Vekić; Vladimir Torubarov	Serbia	1:20.865	QA
3	Denis Myšák; Erik Vlček; Juraj Tarr; Tibor Linka	Slovakia	1:20.981	QA
4	Maxence Beauchesne; Ryan Cochrane; Marshall Hughes; Pierre-Luc Poulin	Canada	1:21.954	QB
5	Omar de Andrés; Juan Ignacio Cáceres; Pablo de Torres; Manuel Lascano	Argentina	1:22.787	QB
6	Ivan Semykin; Kyrylo Cernomorov; Denys Lakmanov; Roman Skoryk	Ukraine	1:23.170	QB
7	Joseph Beevers; Lewis Fletcher; Stelian Naftanaila; Matthew Robinson	Great Britain	1:25.004	
8	Ali Aghamirzaei; Ahmad Reza Talebian; Babak Darban; Peyman Ghavidel Siah Sofiani	Iran	1:25.431	
9	Yavuz Selim Balci; Fahri Ayvaz; Mustafa Özmen; Engin Erkan	Turkey	1:26.942	

==== Semifinal 3 ====
Rank	Kayakers	Country	Time	Notes
1	Tom Liebscher; Ronald Rauhe; Max Rendschmidt; Max Lemke	Germany	1:19.823	QA
2	Yury Postrigay; Vitaly Ershov; Oleg Gusev; Vladislav Blintcov	Russia	1:20.612	QA
3	Aurimas Lankas; Mindaugas Maldonis; Edvinas Ramanauskas; Simonas Maldonis	Lithuania	1:21.556	QA
4	Alessandro Gnecchi; Mauro Pra Floriani; Alberto Ricchetti; Mauro Crenna	Italy	1:21.934	QB
5	Bence Nádas; Sándor Tótka; Péter Molnár; Milán Mozgi	Hungary	1:22.201	QB
6	Per Christian Wessel; Hakeem Teland; Lars Hjemdal; Fridtjof Falch	Norway	1:24.029	QB
7	Seiji Komatsu; Keiji Mizumoto; Momotaro Matsushita; Koyo Niioka	Japan	1:24.918	
8	Emil Noe; Orion Pilo; Troels Lund; Mads Brandt Petersen	Denmark	1:27.706	
9	Maizir Riyondra; Andri Sugiarto; Sutrisno Sutrisno; Tri Wahyu Buwono	Indonesia	1:30.062	

=== Finals ===
==== Final B ====
Competitors in this final raced for positions 10 to 18.

Rank	Kayakers	Country	Time
1	Maxence Beauchesne; Ryan Cochrane; Marshall Hughes; Pierre-Luc Poulin	Canada	1:20.738
2	Alessandro Gnecchi; Mauro Pra Floriani; Alberto Ricchetti; Mauro Crenna	Italy	1:21.049
3	Martin Brzeziński; Bartosz Stabno; Rafał Rosolski; Dawid Putto	Poland	1:21.482
4	Ivan Semykin; Kyrylo Cernomorov; Denys Lakmanov; Roman Skoryk	Ukraine	1:21.588
5	Cosmin Lulciuc; Aurelian Ciocan; Razvan Albisoru; Sorin Cical	Romania	1:21.649
6	Bence Nádas; Sándor Tótka; Péter Molnár; Milán Mozgi	Hungary	1:21.932
7	Omar de Andrés; Juan Ignacio Cáceres; Pablo de Torres; Manuel Lascano	Argentina	1:22.015
8	Emanuel Silva; João Ribeiro; David Fernandes; David Varela	Portugal	1:22.210
9	Per Christian Wessel; Hakeem Teland; Lars Hjemdal; Fridtjof Falch	Norway	1:23.321

==== Final A ====
Competitors in this final raced for positions 1 to 9, with medals going to the top three.

Rank	Kayakers	Country	Time	Notes
1st place, gold medalist(s)	Tom Liebscher; Ronald Rauhe; Max Rendschmidt; Max Lemke	Germany	1:17.734	WB
2nd place, silver medalist(s)	Rodrigo Germade; Cristian Toro; Carlos Garrote; Marcus Walz	Spain	1:18.371	
3rd place, bronze medalist(s)	Daniel Havel; Jan Štěrba; Jakub Špicar; Radek Šlouf	Czech Republic	1:18.729	
4	Yury Postrigay; Vitaly Ershov; Oleg Gusev; Vladislav Blintcov	Russia	1:19.039	
5	Denis Myšák; Erik Vlček; Juraj Tarr; Tibor Linka	Slovakia	1:19.471	
6	Dejan Pajić; Ervin Holpert; Stefan Vekić; Vladimir Torubarov	Serbia	1:19.666	
7	Sébastien Jouve; Guillaume Le Floch Decorchemont; Maxime Beaumont; Étienne Hubert	France	1:19.766	
8	Raman Piatrushenka; Dzmitry Tratsiakou; Mikita Borykau; Vitaliy Bialko	Belarus	1:19.887	
9	Aurimas Lankas; Mindaugas Maldonis; Edvinas Ramanauskas; Simonas Maldonis	Lithuania	1:20.176	
