= Slovakia at the 2016 Summer Olympics =

- IOC code: SVK
- NOC: Slovak Olympic and Sports Committee
- Website: www.olympic.sk (in Slovak)

in Rio de Janeiro
- Competitors: 51 in 12 sports
- Flag bearers: Danka Barteková (opening); Erik Vlček (closing)
- Medals Ranked 37th: Gold 2 Silver 2 Bronze 0 Total 4

Summer Olympics appearances (overview)
- 1996; 2000; 2004; 2008; 2012; 2016; 2020; 2024; 2028

Other related appearances
- Hungary (1896–1912); Czechoslovakia (1924–1992)

Slovakia competed at the 2016 Summer Olympics in Rio de Janeiro, Brazil, from 5 to 21 August 2016. This was the nation's sixth consecutive appearance at the Summer Olympics after gaining its independence from the former Czechoslovakia.

The Slovak Olympic Committee fielded a team of 51 athletes, 32 men and 19 women, across 12 sports at the Games. Although its full roster was larger by four athletes than in London 2012, this was still one of Slovakia's smallest delegations sent to the Summer Olympics. Slovakia made its Olympic debut in archery, as well as its return to synchronized swimming and table tennis after nearly a decade.

The Slovak team featured 17 returning Olympians, including skeet shooter Danka Barteková, who won the bronze in London four years earlier, 2015 world champion Matej Tóth, who entered his fourth consecutive Games as a top medal favorite in the 50 km race walk, and sprint kayaker and two-time medalist Erik Vlček, who joined the slalom canoe legend Michal Martikán as the only Slovaks participating in five Olympics. The only medalist returning from the previous Games to compete in Rio de Janeiro, Barteková was nominated by the committee to carry the Slovak flag at the opening ceremony. Other notable Slovak athletes included pro mountain biker Peter Sagan, twins Dana and Jana Velďáková in both long and triple jump, slalom canoe duo and cousins Ladislav and Peter Škantár, and world-ranked triathlete Richard Varga.

Slovakia left Rio de Janeiro with four medals (two gold and two silver), matching its overall tally from the 2012 Summer Olympics in London. Among the medalists were Tóth, who walked away with Slovakia's first ever track and field gold in his event, and the Škantár cousins, who succeeded the Hochschorner twins Pavol and Peter to win the Olympic title in the slalom canoe double.

== Medalists ==
Medal	Name	Sport	Event	Date
Gold	Ladislav Škantár; Peter Škantár	Canoeing	Men's slalom C-2	11 August
Gold	Matej Tóth	Athletics	Men's 50 km walk	19 August
Silver	Matej Beňuš	Canoeing	Men's slalom C-1	9 August
Silver	Tibor Linka; Denis Myšák; Juraj Tarr; Erik Vlček	Canoeing	Men's K-4 1000 m	20 August

Medals by sport
Sport	1st place, gold medalist(s)	2nd place, silver medalist(s)	3rd place, bronze medalist(s)	Total
Canoeing	1	2	0	3
Athletics	1	0	0	1
Total	2	2	0	4

== Competitors ==
The following is the list of number of competitors participating in the Games and selected biographies.

Sport	Men	Women	Total
Archery	1	1	2
Athletics	8	8	16
Canoeing	10	2	12
Cycling	2	0	2
Gymnastics	0	1	1
Shooting	4	1	5
Swimming	2	1	3
Synchronized swimming	—	2	2
Table tennis	1	2	3
Tennis	2	1	3
Triathlon	1	0	1
Weightlifting	1	0	1
Total	32	19	51

Medals by date
Day	Date	1st place, gold medalist(s)	2nd place, silver medalist(s)	3rd place, bronze medalist(s)	Total
Day 1	6 August	0	0	0	0
Day 2	7 August	0	0	0	0
Day 3	8 August	0	0	0	0
Day 4	9 August	0	1	0	1
Day 5	10 August	0	0	0	0
Day 6	11 August	1	0	0	1
Day 7	12 August	0	0	0	0
Day 8	13 August	0	0	0	0
Day 9	14 August	0	0	0	0
Day 10	15 August	0	0	0	0
Day 11	16 August	0	0	0	0
Day 12	17 August	0	0	0	0
Day 13	18 August	0	0	0	0
Day 14	19 August	1	0	0	1
Day 15	20 August	0	1	0	1
Day 16	21 August	0	0	0	0
Total		2	2	0	4

== Archery ==
One Slovak archer has qualified for the women's individual recurve at the Olympics by securing one of three available Olympic spots at the 2016 European Championships in Nottingham, Great Britain, signifying the nation's Olympic debut in the sport. Meanwhile, another Slovak archer was added to the squad by virtue of a top five national finish in the men's individual recurve at the 2016 Archery World Cup meet in Antalya, Turkey.

Athlete	Event	Ranking round		Round of 64	Round of 32	Round of 16	Quarterfinals	Semifinals	Final / BM	
Athlete	Event	Score	Seed	Opposition Score	Opposition Score	Opposition Score	Opposition Score	Opposition Score	Opposition Score	Rank
Boris Baláž	Men's individual	631	59	Ku B-c (KOR); L 0–6	did not advance					
Alexandra Longová	Women's individual	640	22	Majhi (IND); W 7–1	Qi Yh (CHN); L 0–6	did not advance				

== Athletics ==
Slovak athletes have so far achieved qualifying standards in the following athletics events (up to a maximum of 3 athletes in each event):

Key

- Note–Ranks given for track events are within the athlete's heat only
- Q = Qualified for the next round
- q = Qualified for the next round as a fastest loser or, in field events, by position without achieving the qualifying target
- NR = National record
- N/A = Round not applicable for the event
- Bye = Athlete not required to compete in round
- NM = No mark

Track & road events
Men

Athlete	Event	Heat		Semifinal		Final	
Athlete	Event	Result	Rank	Result	Rank	Result	Rank
Jozef Repčík	800 m	1:49.95	6	did not advance			
Martin Kučera	400 m hurdles	51.47	7	did not advance			
Anton Kučmín	20 km walk	—N/a				1:23:17	32
Dušan Majdán	50 km walk	—N/a				3:58:25	26
Martin Tišťan	50 km walk	—N/a				DSQ	
Matej Tóth	50 km walk	—N/a				3:40:58	1st place, gold medalist(s)

Women

Athlete	Event	Heat		Semifinal		Final	
Athlete	Event	Result	Rank	Result	Rank	Result	Rank
Iveta Putálová	400 m	52.82	5	did not advance			
Lucia Hrivnák Klocová	800 m	2:00.57	4	did not advance			
Katarína Berešová	Marathon	—N/a				2:50:54	107
Mária Czaková	20 km walk	—N/a				1:38:29	48
Mária Gáliková	20 km walk	—N/a				1:40:35	55

Field events

Athlete	Event	Qualification		Final	
Athlete	Event	Distance	Position	Distance	Position
Matúš Bubeník	Men's high jump	2.17	=35	did not advance	
Marcel Lomnický	Men's hammer throw	74.16	10 q	75.97	5
Jana Velďáková	Women's long jump	6.48	15	did not advance	
Dana Velďáková	Women's triple jump	13.98	17	did not advance	
Martina Hrašnová	Women's hammer throw	67.63	19	did not advance	

== Canoeing ==
=== Slalom ===
Slovak canoeists have qualified a maximum of one boat in each of the following classes through the 2015 ICF Canoe Slalom World Championships. Matej Beňuš became the first canoeist to be named to the Slovak team based on his performance at two ICF World Cup meets each in La Seu d'Urgell and Pau, and at the World Championships in London. Meanwhile, the remaining canoeists (Grigar, Dukátová, and Škantár cousins) rounded out the internal selection at the 2016 European Championships in Liptovský Mikuláš.

Athlete	Event	Preliminary						Semifinal		Final	
Athlete	Event	Run 1	Rank	Run 2	Rank	Best	Rank	Time	Rank	Time	Rank
Matej Beňuš	Men's C-1	95.05	2	96.78	5	95.05	6 Q	100.68	8 Q	95.02	2nd place, silver medalist(s)
Ladislav Škantár; Peter Škantár	Men's C-2	100.89	1	106.00	3	100.89	1 Q	110.42	6 Q	101.58	1st place, gold medalist(s)
Jakub Grigar	Men's K-1	89.16	6	87.85	3	87.85	4 Q	88.84	1 Q	89.43	5
Jana Dukátová	Women's K-1	102.25	4	105.87	7	102.25	6 Q	106.59	6 Q	103.86	4

=== Sprint ===
Slovak canoeists have qualified three boats in each of the following distances for the Games through the 2015 ICF Canoe Sprint World Championships. Meanwhile, two additional boats (women's K-1 200 & 500 m) were awarded to the Slovak squad by virtue of a top two national finish at the 2016 European Qualification Regatta in Duisburg, Germany.

Men

Athlete	Event	Heats		Semifinals		Final	
Athlete	Event	Time	Rank	Time	Rank	Time	Rank
Vincent Farkaš	C-1 1000 m	4:12.295	5 Q	4:19.084	5 FB	4:04.013	10
Peter Gelle	K-1 1000 m	3:36.342	2 Q	3:36.193	3 FA	3:40.691	8
Juraj Tarr; Erik Vlček	K-2 1000 m	3:24.728	2 Q	3:19.372	3 FA	3:15.916	8
Tibor Linka; Denis Myšák; Juraj Tarr; Erik Vlček	K-4 1000 m	2:55.628	2 Q	2:59.362	1 FA	3:05.044	2nd place, silver medalist(s)

Women

Athlete	Event	Heats		Semifinals		Final	
Athlete	Event	Time	Rank	Time	Rank	Time	Rank
Martina Kohlová	K-1 200 m	41.231	2 Q	41.286	4 FB	41.787	10
Martina Kohlová	K-1 500 m	1:53.167	4 Q	1:57.801	5 FB	1:58.211	13

Qualification Legend: FA = Qualify to final (medal); FB = Qualify to final B (non-medal)

== Cycling ==
=== Road ===
Slovakia has qualified one rider in the men's Olympic road race by virtue of his best ranking among the top 100 individuals in the 2015 UCI World Tour.

Athlete	Event	Time	Rank
Patrik Tybor	Men's road race	6:30:05	45

=== Mountain biking ===
Slovakia has qualified one mountain biker for the men's Olympic cross-country race, as a result of his nation's fifteenth-place finish in the UCI Olympic Ranking List of May 25, 2016.

Athlete	Event	Time	Rank
Peter Sagan	Men's cross-country	LAP (1 lap)	35

== Gymnastics ==
=== Artistic ===
Slovakia has entered one artistic gymnast into the Olympic competition. Barbora Mokošová had claimed her Olympic spot in the women's apparatus and all-around events at the Olympic Test Event in Rio de Janeiro.

Women

Athlete	Event	Qualification						Final					
Athlete	Event	Apparatus				Total	Rank	Apparatus				Total	Rank
Athlete	Event	V	UB	BB	F	Total	Rank	V	UB	BB	F	Total	Rank
Barbora Mokošová	All-around	13.933	13.800	12.033	13.033	52.799	45	did not advance					

== Shooting ==
Slovak shooters have achieved quota places for the following events by virtue of their best finishes at the 2014 and 2015 ISSF World Championships, the 2015 ISSF World Cup series, and European Championships or Games, as long as they obtained a minimum qualifying score (MQS) by March 31, 2016.

Athlete	Event	Qualification		Semifinal		Final	
Athlete	Event	Points	Rank	Points	Rank	Points	Rank
Pavol Kopp	Men's 10 m air pistol	569	38	—N/a		did not advance	
Pavol Kopp	Men's 50 m pistol	556	7 Q	—N/a		91.4	7
Marián Kovačócy	Men's trap	114	18	did not advance			
Juraj Tužinský	Men's 10 m air pistol	582	3 Q	—N/a		159.4	4
Juraj Tužinský	Men's 50 m pistol	541	33	—N/a		did not advance	
Erik Varga	Men's trap	114	21	did not advance			
Danka Barteková	Women's skeet	64	16	did not advance			

Qualification Legend: Q = Qualify for the next round; q = Qualify for the bronze medal (shotgun)

== Swimming ==
Slovak swimmers have so far achieved qualifying standards in the following events (up to a maximum of 2 swimmers in each event at the Olympic Qualifying Time (OQT), and potentially 1 at the Olympic Selection Time (OST)):

Athlete	Event	Heat		Semifinal		Final	
Athlete	Event	Time	Rank	Time	Rank	Time	Rank
Tomáš Klobučník	Men's 100 m breaststroke	1:02.93	42	did not advance			
Richárd Nagy	Men's 1500 m freestyle	15:26.48	34	—N/a		did not advance	
Richárd Nagy	Men's 400 m individual medley	4:13.87 NR	9	—N/a		did not advance	
Richárd Nagy	Men's 10 km open water	—N/a				1:53:35.4	20
Katarína Listopadová	Women's 100 m backstroke	1:01.43	22	did not advance			
Katarína Listopadová	Women's 100 m butterfly	59.57	29	did not advance			

== Synchronized swimming ==
Slovakia has fielded a squad of two synchronized swimmers to compete only in the women's duet by picking up one of four spare berths freed by the continental selection for being the next highest ranking nation at the FINA Olympic test event in Rio de Janeiro, signifying their nation's Olympic comeback to the sport since 2004.

Athlete	Event	Technical routine		Free routine (preliminary)			Free routine (final)		
Athlete	Event	Points	Rank	Points	Total (technical + free)	Rank	Points	Total (technical + free)	Rank
Naďa Daabousová; Jana Labáthová	Duet	78.3607	22	77.7000	156.0607	22	did not advance		

== Table tennis ==
Slovakia has entered three athletes into the table tennis competition at the Games, signifying the nation's Olympic return to the sport after an eight-year hiatus. Chinese-born Wang Yang and Barbora Balážová were automatically selected among the top 22 eligible players each in their respective singles events based on the ITTF Olympic Rankings. Meanwhile, Beijing 2008 Olympian Eva Ódorová granted an invitation from ITTF to compete in the women's singles as one of the next seven highest-ranked eligible players, not yet qualified, on the Olympic Ranking List.

Athlete	Event	Preliminary	Round 1	Round 2	Round 3	Round of 16	Quarterfinals	Semifinals	Final / BM	
Athlete	Event	Opposition Result	Opposition Result	Opposition Result	Opposition Result	Opposition Result	Opposition Result	Opposition Result	Opposition Result	Rank
Wang Yang	Men's singles	Bye	Madrid (MEX); W 4–1	Aruna (NGR); L 1–4	did not advance					
Barbora Balážová	Women's singles	Bye	Silva (MEX); W 4–0	Li F (SWE); L 3–4	did not advance					
Eva Ódorová	Women's singles	Bye	Wu (USA); L 1–4	did not advance						

== Tennis ==
Slovakia has entered three tennis players into the Olympic tournament. Martin Kližan (world no. 51), Dominika Cibulková (world no. 21), and Anna Karolína Schmiedlová (world no. 40) qualified directly among the top 56 eligible players for their respective singles events based on the ATP and WTA World Rankings as of June 6, 2016. Having been directly entered to the singles, Kližan also opted to play with his rookie partner Andrej Martin in the men's doubles.

On July 27, 2016, Kližan pulled out from the Games due to his concerns about the Zika virus. Thereby, Martin replaced him in the men's singles and was subsequently set to play with Igor Zelenay in the men's doubles. Almost a week later, Cibulková withdrew from the Games due to a heel injury, leaving Schmiedlová as the lone female competitor.

Athlete	Event	Round of 64	Round of 32	Round of 16	Quarterfinals	Semifinals	Final / BM	
Athlete	Event	Opposition Score	Opposition Score	Opposition Score	Opposition Score	Opposition Score	Opposition Score	Rank
Andrej Martin	Men's singles	Kudla (USA); W 6–0, 6–3	Kohlschreiber (GER); W WO	Nishikori (JPN); L 2–6, 2–6	did not advance			
Andrej Martin; Igor Zelenay	Men's doubles	—N/a	Elias / Sousa (POR); L 4–6, 2–6	did not advance				
Anna Karolína Schmiedlová	Women's singles	Vinci (ITA); W 7–5, 6–4	Makarova (RUS); L 6–3, 4–6, 2–6	did not advance				

== Triathlon ==
Slovakia has entered one triathlete to compete at the Games. London 2012 Olympian Richard Varga was ranked among the top 40 eligible triathletes in the men's event based on the ITU Olympic Qualification List as of May 15, 2016.

Athlete	Event	Swim (1.5 km)	Trans 1	Bike (40 km)	Trans 2	Run (10 km)	Total Time	Rank
Richard Varga	Men's	17:18	0:49	55:10	0:34	34:06	1:47:17	11

== Weightlifting ==
Slovakia has qualified one male weightlifter for the Rio Olympics by virtue of a top seven national finish at the 2016 European Championships. The team must allocate this place by June 20, 2016.

Athlete	Event	Snatch		Clean & Jerk		Total	Rank
Athlete	Event	Result	Rank	Result	Rank	Total	Rank
Ondrej Kružel	Men's +105 kg	165	=21	206	18	371	18

== See also ==
- Slovakia at the 2016 Summer Paralympics
