= 2017 ICF Canoe Sprint World Championships – Men's K-2 500 metres =

Men's K-2 500 metres at the 2017 ICF Canoe Sprint World Championships
- Venue: Sportcentrum Račice
- Location: Račice, Czech Republic
- Dates: 24–26 August
- Competitors: 44 from 22 nations
- Winning time: 1:27.979

Medalists
gold medal	Rodrigo Germade; Marcus Walz	Spain
silver medal	Bence Nádas; Sándor Tótka	Hungary
bronze medal	Raman Piatrushenka; Vitaliy Bialko	Belarus

The men's K-2 500 metres competition at the 2017 ICF Canoe Sprint World Championships in Račice took place at the Sportcentrum Račice.

== Schedule ==
The schedule was as follows:

Date	Time	Round
Thursday 24 August 2017	11:02	Heats
Thursday 24 August 2017	17:20	Semifinals
Saturday 26 August 2017	10:10	Final B
Saturday 26 August 2017	11:41	Final A

All times are Central European Summer Time (UTC+2)

== Results ==
=== Heats ===
Heat winners advanced directly to the A final. The next six fastest boats in each heat advanced to the semifinals.

==== Heat 1 ====
Rank	Kayakers	Country	Time	Notes
1	Sébastien Jouve; Guillaume Le Floch Decorchemont	France	1:31.028	QA
2	Maximilian Zaremba; Kostja Stroinski	Germany	1:31.284	QS
3	Simo Boltić; Dragan Hančovski	Serbia	1:35.401	QS
4	René Holten Poulsen; Nils Jensen Boe	Denmark	1:38.101	QS
5	Jayden Ellis; Simon McTavish	Australia	1:38.367	QS
6	Yevgeniy Alexeyev; Alexey Dergunov	Kazakhstan	1:40.828	QS
7	Li Zhuang; Yan Jiahao	China	1:47.334	QS

==== Heat 2 ====
Rank	Kayakers	Country	Time	Notes
1	Rodrigo Germade; Marcus Walz	Spain	1:30.976	QA
2	Erik Vlček; Tibor Linka	Slovakia	1:33.593	QS
3	Ezequiel Di Giacomo; Gonzalo Carreras	Argentina	1:33.682	QS
4	Viliyan Buchvarov; Hristo Rekov	Bulgaria	1:34.587	QS
5	Vitaliy Bialko; Raman Piatrushenka	Belarus	1:38.043	QS
6	Maksim Bondar; Igor Dorofeev	Kyrgyzstan	1:38.576	QS
7	Maks Franceskin; Vid Debeljak	Slovenia	1:43.643	QS
8	Arambam Gyanjit Singh; Albert Raj Selvaraj	India	1:46.432	

==== Heat 3 ====
Rank	Kayakers	Country	Time	Notes
1	Bence Nádas; Sándor Tótka	Hungary	1:30.343	QA
2	Oleg Gusev; Vladislav Blintcov	Russia	1:31.143	QS
3	Radek Šlouf; Jan Štěrba	Czech Republic	1:31.288	QS
4	Kaspar Sula; Kaarel Alupere	Estonia	1:33.699	QS
5	Dorian Kliczkowski; Norbert Kuczyński	Poland	1:35.193	QS
6	David Kopp; Jhonny Blixt	Sweden	1:35.982	QS
7	Maizir Riyondra; Tri Wahyu Buwono	Indonesia	1:38.955	QS

=== Semifinals ===
Qualification was as follows:

The fastest three boats in each semi advanced to the A final.
The next four fastest boats in each semi, plus the fastest remaining boat advanced to the B final.

==== Semifinal 1 ====
Rank	Kayakers	Country	Time	Notes
1	Radek Šlouf; Jan Štěrba	Czech Republic	1:30.454	QA
2	René Holten Poulsen; Nils Jensen Boe	Denmark	1:30.476	QA
3	Vitaliy Bialko; Raman Piatrushenka	Belarus	1:31.493	QA
4	Ezequiel Di Giacomo; Gonzalo Carreras	Argentina	1:31.531	QB
5	Maximilian Zaremba; Kostja Stroinski	Germany	1:33.165	QB
6	Yevgeniy Alexeyev; Alexey Dergunov	Kazakhstan	1:33.193	QB
7	David Kopp; Jhonny Blixt	Sweden	1:34.126	QB
8	Kaspar Sula; Kaarel Alupere	Estonia	1:34.304	qB
9	Maks Franceskin; Vid Debeljak	Slovenia	2:00.798	

==== Semifinal 2 ====
Rank	Kayakers	Country	Time	Notes
1	Erik Vlček; Tibor Linka	Slovakia	1:30.305	QA
2	Oleg Gusev; Vladislav Blintcov	Russia	1:31.399	QA
3	Jayden Ellis; Simon McTavish	Australia	1:32.633	QA
4	Viliyan Buchvarov; Hristo Rekov	Bulgaria	1:32.821	QB
5	Dorian Kliczkowski; Norbert Kuczyński	Poland	1:32.977	QB
6	Simo Boltić; Dragan Hančovski	Serbia	1:35.371	QB
7	Maizir Riyondra; Tri Wahyu Buwono	Indonesia	1:36.405	QB
8	Maksim Bondar; Igor Dorofeev	Kyrgyzstan	1:37.894	
9	Li Zhuang; Yan Jiahao	China	1:45.827	

=== Finals ===
==== Final B ====
Competitors in this final raced for positions 10 to 18.

Rank	Kayakers	Country	Time
1	Ezequiel Di Giacomo; Gonzalo Carreras	Argentina	1:30.061
2	Maximilian Zaremba; Kostja Stroinski	Germany	1:30.322
3	Viliyan Buchvarov; Hristo Rekov	Bulgaria	1:30.377
4	Kaspar Sula; Kaarel Alupere	Estonia	1:30.900
5	Yevgeniy Alexeyev; Alexey Dergunov	Kazakhstan	1:31.150
6	David Kopp; Jhonny Blixt	Sweden	1:31.533
7	Dorian Kliczkowski; Norbert Kuczyński	Poland	1:31.750
8	Simo Boltić; Dragan Hančovski	Serbia	1:32.833
9	Maizir Riyondra; Tri Wahyu Buwono	Indonesia	1:40.300

==== Final A ====
Competitors in this final raced for positions 1 to 9, with medals going to the top three.

Rank	Kayakers	Country	Time
1st place, gold medalist(s)	Rodrigo Germade; Marcus Walz	Spain	1:27.979
2nd place, silver medalist(s)	Bence Nádas; Sándor Tótka	Hungary	1:29.107
3rd place, bronze medalist(s)	Vitaliy Bialko; Raman Piatrushenka	Belarus	1:29.518
4	Erik Vlček; Tibor Linka	Slovakia	1:29.868
5	Sébastien Jouve; Guillaume Le Floch Decorchemont	France	1:29.963
6	Oleg Gusev; Vladislav Blintcov	Russia	1:30.191
7	Radek Šlouf; Jan Štěrba	Czech Republic	1:30.563
8	René Holten Poulsen; Nils Jensen Boe	Denmark	1:31.213
9	Jayden Ellis; Simon McTavish	Australia	1:33.841
