= 2016 Canoe Sprint European Championships =

International canoeing and kayaking event

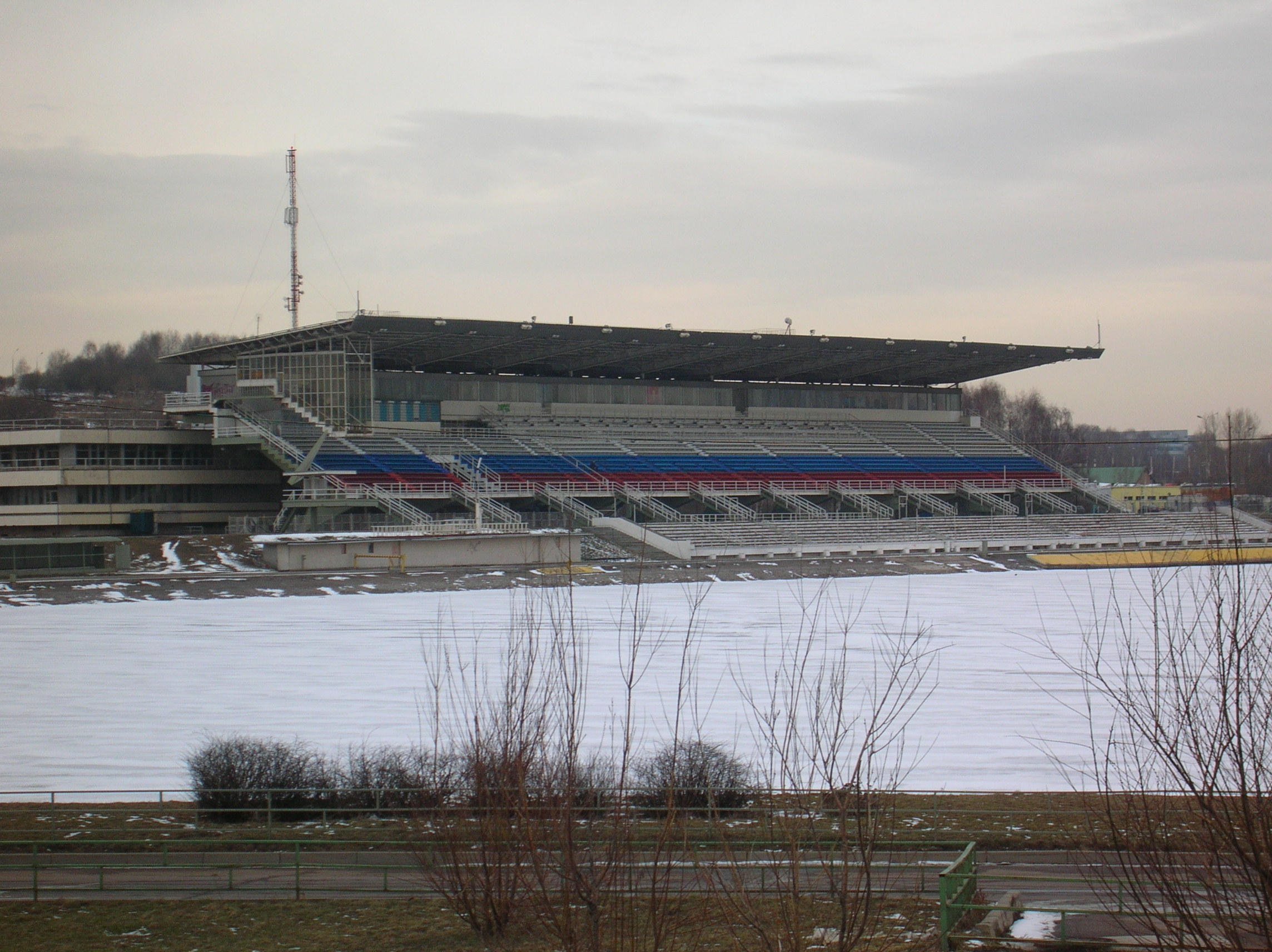
- Venue: Moscow Canoeing and Rowing Basin
- Location: Moscow, Russia
- Start date: 24 June
- End date: 26 June

The 2016 Canoe Sprint European Championships (Russian: Чемпионат Европы по гребле на байдарках и каноэ 2016) was the 28th edition of the Canoe Sprint European Championships, an international sprint canoe/kayak and paracanoe event organised by the European Canoe Association, held in Moscow, Russia, between 24 and 26 June 2016.

== Canoe sprint ==
=== Medal table ===
* Host nation

Rank	Nation	Gold	Silver	Bronze	Total
1	Hungary (HUN)	5	5	4	14
2	Russia (RUS)*	5	4	3	12
3	Germany (GER)	4	4	3	11
4	Belarus (BLR)	3	2	5	10
5	Serbia (SRB)	3	0	1	4
6	Slovakia (SVK)	2	1	1	4
7	Portugal (POR)	2	0	0	2
8	Great Britain (GBR)	1	1	0	2
9	Czech Republic (CZE)	1	0	1	2
10	Turkey (TUR)	1	0	0	1
11	Denmark (DEN)	0	3	1	4
12	Romania (ROU)	0	1	3	4
13	Lithuania (LTU)	0	1	1	2
13	Moldova (MLD)	0	1	1	2
13	Spain (ESP)	0	1	1	2
13	Ukraine (UKR)	0	1	1	2
17	Bulgaria (BUL)	0	1	0	1
17	Sweden (SWE)	0	1	0	1
19	Poland (POL)	0	0	2	2
20	Latvia (LAT)	0	0	1	1
Totals (20 entries)		27	27	29	83

=== Men ===
Event	Gold	Time	Silver	Time	Bronze	Time
C-1 200 m	Andrey Kraitor (RUS)	0:39.080	Henrikas Žustautas (LTU)	0:39.432	Artsem Kozyr (BLR)	0:39.440
C-1 500 m	Martin Fuksa (CZE)	1:48.520	Mikhail Pavlov (RUS)	1:50.548	Oleg Tarnovschi (MDA)	1:50.832
C-1 1000 m	Sebastian Brendel (GER)	3:51.248	Serghei Tarnovschi (MDA)	3:52.164	Martin Fuksa (CZE)	3:52.688
C-1 5000 m	Tamás Kiss (HUN)	22:15.350	Ronald Verch (GER)	22:19.180	Mateusz Kaminski (POL)	22:48.500
C-2 200 m	Belarus; Hleb Saladukha; Aliaksandr Vauchetski	0:36:996	Germany; Stefan Kiraj; Stefan Holtz	0:37:216	Russia; Alexander Kovalenko; Andrey Kraitor	0:37:464
C-2 500 m	Russia; Viktor Melantyev; Ivan Shtyl	1:41:216	Romania; Josif Chirilă; Victor Mihalachi	1:42.796	Ukraine; Vitaliy Verheles; Denys Kamerylov	1:43.520
C-2 1000 m	Russia; Alexey Korovashkov; Ilya Pervukhin	3:37.804	Belarus; Andrei Bahdanovich; Aliaksandr Bahdanovich	3:40.212	Hungary; Henrik Vasbányai; Róbert Mike	3:40.532
C-4 1000 m	Russia; Kirill Shamshurin; Viktor Melantyev; Rasul Ishmukhamedov; Vladislav Chebotar	3:25.044	Ukraine; Denys Kovalenko; Vitaliy Verheles; Denys Kamerylov; Eduard Shemetylo	3:26.736	Romania; Josif Chirilă; Adi-Aurelian Grozuta; Petre Condrat; Simion Cosmin	3:26.884
K-1 200 m	Liam Heath (GBR)	0:34.412	Petter Menning (SWE)	0:34.872	Aleksejs Rumjancevs (LAT) Ignas Navakauskas (LTU)	0:35.072 0:35.072
K-1 500 m	Tom Liebscher (GER)	1:37.684	René Holten Poulsen (DEN)	1:39.184	Bence Nádas (HUN)	1:39.192
K-1 1000 m	Fernando Pimenta (POR)	3:29.040	René Holten Poulsen (DEN)	3:32.296	Bálint Kopasz (HUN)	3:32.656
K-1 5000 m	Fernando Pimenta (POR)	20:09.690	René Holten Poulsen (DEN)	20:11.870	Aleh Yurenia (BLR)	20:12.420
K-2 200 m	Serbia; Nebojša Grujić; Marko Novaković	0:31.284	Hungary; Bence Horváth; Máte Szomolányi	0:31.332	Germany; Ronald Rauhe; Tom Liebscher	0:31.384
K-2 500 m	Slovakia; Martin Jankovec; Gábor Jakubík	1:29.712	Spain; Gabriel Campo; Ruben Millan	1:29.984	Belarus; Vitaliy Bialko; Raman Piatrushenka	1:30.816
K-2 1000 m (Note: Tibor Hufnágel and Bence Dombvári of Hungary, who originally clocked 3:13.008 for silver, were disqualified after it emerged Dombvári tested positive for stanozolol a few weeks after the race.)	Germany; Max Hoff; Marcus Gross	3:12.732	Serbia; Marko Tomićević; Milenko Zorić	3:13.832	Belarus; Pavel Miadzvedzeu; Aleh Yurenia	3:13.840
K-4 500 m	Hungary; Bence Nádas; Péter Molnár; Sándor Tótka; Tamás Somorácz	1:19.760	Slovakia; Denis Myšák; Juraj Tarr; Erik Vlček; Tibor Linka	1:20.560	Spain; Francisco Cubelos; Albert Marti; Roi Rodriguez; Diego Cosgaya Russia; Artem Kuzakhmetov; Oleg Gusev; Aleksandr Sergeev; Vladislav Blintcov	1:21.228 1:21.228
K-4 1000 m	Slovakia; Denis Myšák; Juraj Tarr; Erik Vlcek; Tibor Linka	2:51.640	Russia; Kirill Lyapunov; Roman Anoshkin; Vasily Pogreban; Oleg Zhestkov	2:52.156	Poland; Martin Brzezinski; Rafal Rosolski; Bartosz Stabno; Norbert Kuczynski	2:53.440

=== Women ===
Event	Gold	Time	Silver	Time	Bronze	Time
C-1 200 m	Olesia Romasenko (RUS)	0:47.616	Staniliya Stamenova (BUL)	0:48.712	Paula Postaru (ROU)	0:49.116
C-2 500 m	Belarus; Nadzeya Makarchanka; Alena Nazdrova	2:02.672	Russia; Irina Andreeva; Olesia Romasenko	2:03.752	Hungary; Virág Balla; Kincső Takács	2:04.816
K-1 200 m	Lasma Liepa (TUR)	0:40.792	Jess Walker (GBR)	0:40.940	Ivana Kmetova (SVK)	0:41.000
K-1 500 m	Danuta Kozák (HUN)	1:48.600	Franziska Weber (GER)	1:49.324	Emma Jørgensen (DEN)	1:49.576
K-1 1000 m	Kristina Bedeč (SRB)	4:00.840	Tamara Takács (HUN)	4:00.988	Conny Wassmuth (GER)	4:03.128
K-1 5000 m	Maryna Litvinchuk (BLR)	22:23.450	Dóra Bodonyi (HUN)	22:24.550	Yuliana Salakhova (RUS)	22:25.750
K-2 200 m	Germany; Franziska Weber; Tina Dietze	0:37.548	Russia; Elena Terekhova; Anastasia Nevskaya	0:38.296	Belarus; Marharyta Makhneva; Maryna Litvinchuk	0:38.448
K-2 500 m	Hungary; Gabriella Szabó; Danuta Kozák	1:41.316	Germany; Sabrina Hering; Steffi Kriegerstein	1:42.556	Belarus; Nadzeya Liapeshka; Maryna Litvinchuk	1:43.564
K-2 1000 m	Serbia; Milica Starović; Dalma Ružičić-Benedek	3:38.564	Hungary; Tamara Takács; Erika Medveczky	3:40.444	Romania; Ciuta Florida; Iulia Taran	3:43.840
K-4 500 m	Hungary; Gabriella Szabó; Tamara Csipes; Danuta Kozák; Krisztina Fazekas-Zur	1:30.940	Belarus; Marharyta Makhneva; Volha Khudzenka; Nadzeya Liapeshka; Maryna Litvinchuk	1:31.380	Germany; Franziska Weber; Steffi Kriegerstein; Sabrina Hering; Tina Dietze	1:32.280

== Paracanoe ==
=== Medal table ===
* Host nation

Rank	Nation	Gold	Silver	Bronze	Total
1	Russia (RUS)*	5	3	1	9
2	Germany (GER)	2	1	0	3
3	Hungary (HUN)	2	0	1	3
4	Austria (AUT)	1	0	0	1
4	Sweden (SWE)	1	0	0	1
6	Italy (ITA)	0	3	1	4
7	France (FRA)	0	2	1	3
8	Spain (ESP)	0	2	0	2
9	Belarus (BLR)	0	0	1	1
9	Israel (ISR)	0	0	1	1
9	Poland (POL)	0	0	1	1
9	Romania (ROU)	0	0	1	1
9	Slovenia (SLO)	0	0	1	1
Totals (13 entries)		11	11	9	31

=== Medal events ===
Non-Paralympic classes

Event	Gold		Silver		Bronze	
Men's KL1	Hungary; Róbert Suba	51.228	France; Rémy Boullé	52.004	Belarus; Andrei Tkachuk	53.628
Men's KL2	Austria; Markus Swoboda	41.920	Italy; Federico Mancarella	44.540	Slovenia; Dejan Fabčič	45.416
Men's KL3	Russia; Leonid Krylov	40.028	Germany; Tom Kierey	40.224	France; Martin Farineaux	41.764
Men's VL1	Hungary; Róbert Suba	58.584	Russia; Pavel Gromov	1:01.052	No bronze medalist: only two competitors	
Men's VL2	Germany; Ivo Kilian	52.992	Spain; Javier Reja Muñoz	53.408	Italy; Giuseppe di Lelio	53.856
Men's VL3	Russia; Victor Potanin	51.072	Italy; Pier Buccoliero	51.172	Russia; Aleksei Egorov	52.172
Women's KL1	Germany; Edina Müller	54.956	Russia; Alexandra Dupik	56.900	Poland; Kamila Kubas	59.356
Women's KL2	Russia; Nadezda Andreeva	54.904	Russia; Rimma Egorkina	55.424	Israel; Pascale Bercovitch	1:00.472
Women's KL3	Sweden; Helene Ripa	51.432	France; Cindy Moreau	51.576	Romania; Mihaela Lulea	52.032
Women's VL1+2	Russia; Nadezda Andreeva (VL2)	1:02.836	Italy; Veronica Biglia (VL2)	1:09.700	Hungary; Julianna Tóth (VL2)	1:13.844
Women's VL3	Russia; Larisa Volik	1:02.980	Spain; Maria Calvo	1:10.048	No bronze medalist: only two competitors	
