= 2015 ICF Canoe Sprint World Championships =

41st edition of the World Championships

- Venue: Idroscalo
- Location: Milan, Italy
- Start date: 19 August
- End date: 23 August

The 2015 ICF Canoe Sprint World Championships, the 41st edition of the World Championships, were held from 19–23 August 2015 in Milan, Italy.

== Explanation of events ==
Canoe sprint competitions are broken up into Canadian canoe (C), an open canoe with a single-blade paddle, or in kayaks (K), a closed canoe with a double-bladed paddle. Each canoe or kayak can hold one person (1), two people (2), or four people (4). For each of the specific canoes or kayaks, such as a K-1 (kayak single), the competition distances can be 200 metres (660 ft), 500 metres (1,600 ft), or 1,000 metres (3,300 ft) long. When a competition is listed as a C-2 500 m event as an example, it means two people are in a canoe competing at a 500 metres (1,600 ft) distance.

== Medal summary ==
=== Medal table ===
Rank	Nation	Gold	Silver	Bronze	Total
1	Belarus	5	2	3	10
2	Germany	4	2	4	10
3	Hungary	3	6	4	13
4	Russia	2	1	1	4
5	Australia	2	1	0	3
6	Denmark	2	0	0	2
6	New Zealand	2	0	0	2
8	Czech Republic	1	2	1	4
9	Brazil	1	0	1	2
9	Canada	1	0	1	2
11	Bulgaria	1	0	0	1
11	Romania	1	0	0	1
11	Slovakia	1	0	0	1
14	Serbia	0	3	1	4
15	Poland	0	2	2	4
16	Spain	0	2	1	3
17	China	0	1	1	2
17	France	0	1	1	2
17	Moldova	0	1	1	2
17	Ukraine	0	1	1	2
21	Great Britain	0	1	0	1
22	Portugal	0	0	1	1
22	Sweden	0	0	1	1
22	United States	0	0	1	1
Totals (24 entries)		26	26	26	78

=== Men ===
Non-Olympic classes

==== Canoe ====
Event	Gold		Silver		Bronze	
C–1 200 m	Belarus; Artsem Kozyr	38.605	China; Li Qiang	38.815	Brazil; Isaquias Queiroz	38.915
C–1 500 m	Czech Republic; Martin Fuksa	1:51.004	Moldova; Oleg Tarnovschi	1:51.670	Belarus; Maksim Piatrou	1:53.130
C–1 1000 m	Germany; Sebastian Brendel	3:48.956	Czech Republic; Martin Fuksa	3:48.973	Moldova; Serghei Tarnovschi	3:51.583
C–1 5000 m	Germany; Sebastian Brendel	23:03.32	Spain; Manuel Antonio Campos	23:04.30	Poland; Mateusz Kamiński	23:05.54
C–2 200 m	Russia; Alexey Korovashkov; Ivan Shtyl	36.347	Belarus; Hleb Saladhuka; Dzianis Makhlai	37.516	Germany; Stefan Holtz; Robert Nuck	37.750
C–2 500 m	Russia; Pavel Petrov; Mikhail Pavlov	1:42.035	Poland; Wiktor Głazunow; Vincent Słomiński	1:42.575	Ukraine; Dmytro Ianchuk; Taras Mishchuk	1:42.759
C–2 1000 m	Brazil; Erlon Silva; Isaquias Queiroz	3:38.508	Hungary; Henrik Vasbányai; Róbert Mike	3:38.836	Poland; Piotr Kuleta; Marcin Grzybowski	3:39.305
C–4 1000 m	Romania; Leonid Carp; Petre Condrat; Josif Chirilă; Stefan Strat	3:23.202	Ukraine; Denys Kovalenko; Denys Kamerylov; Vitaliy Vergeles; Eduard Shemetylo	3:23.882	Hungary; Pál Sarudi; Tamás Kiss; András Vass; Dávid Varga	3:24.442

==== Kayak ====
Event	Gold		Silver		Bronze	
K–1 200 m	Canada; Mark de Jonge	34.801	France; Maxime Beaumont	34.993	Sweden; Petter Menning	35.002
K–1 500 m	Denmark; René Holten Poulsen	1:39.407	Germany; Tom Liebscher	1:39.893	Russia; Roman Anoshkin	1:40.770
K–1 1000 m	Denmark; René Holten Poulsen	3:25.815	Czech Republic; Josef Dostál	3:26.298	Portugal; Fernando Pimenta	3:26.535
K–1 5000 m	Australia; Ken Wallace	19:54.46	Germany; Max Hoff	19:57.57	Belarus; Aleh Yurenia	20:11.91
K–2 200 m	Hungary; Sándor Tótka; Péter Molnár	30.935	Serbia; Nebojša Grujić; Marko Novaković	31.046	France; Sebastien Jouve; Maxime Beaumont	31.175
K–2 500 m	Australia; Ken Wallace; Lachlan Tame	1:29.216	Spain; Marcus Walz; Diego Cosgaya	1:30.004	Hungary; Dávid Hérics; Tamás Somorácz	1:30.524
K–2 1000 m	Germany; Max Rendschmidt; Marcus Gross	3:10.175	Australia; Ken Wallace; Lachlan Tame	3:11.132	Serbia; Marko Tomićević; Milenko Zorić	3:11.502
K–4 1000 m	Slovakia; Denis Myšák; Erik Vlček; Juraj Tarr; Tibor Linka	2:56.102	Hungary; Zoltán Kammerer; Dávid Tóth; Tamás Kulifai; Dániel Pauman	2:56.902	Czech Republic; Daniel Havel; Lukáš Trefil; Josef Dostál; Jan Štěrba	2:58.139

=== Women ===
Non-Olympic classes

==== Canoe ====
Event	Gold		Silver		Bronze	
C–1 200 m	Bulgaria; Staniliya Stamenova	48.717	Hungary; Kincső Takács	48.817	Belarus; Kamila Bobr	49.225
C–2 500 m	Belarus; Daryna Kastsiuchenka; Kamila Bobr	2:00.675	Russia; Maria Kazakova; Olesia Romasenko	2:01.798	Hungary; Kincsö Takács; Zsanett Lakatos	2:02.798

==== Kayak ====
Event	Gold		Silver		Bronze	
K–1 200 m	New Zealand; Lisa Carrington	40.060	Poland; Marta Walczykiewicz	40.700	Spain; Teresa Portela	41.248
K–1 500 m	New Zealand; Lisa Carrington	1:49.398	Hungary; Anna Kárász	1:51.125	China; Zhou Yu	1:51.478
K–1 1000 m	Hungary; Erika Medveczky	4:04.037	Serbia; Kristina Bedeč	4:06.397	United States; Margaret Hogan	4:07.414
K–1 5000 m	Belarus; Maryna Litvinchuk	22:36.06	Great Britain; Lani Belcher	22:40.02	Canada; Émilie Fournel	22:43.59
K–2 200 m	Belarus; Marharyta Tsishkevich; Maryna Litvinchuk	38.477	Hungary; Luca Homonnai; Natasa Dusev-Janics	38.659	Germany; Sabrina Hering; Steffi Kriegerstein	39.488
K–2 500 m	Hungary; Gabriella Szabó; Danuta Kozák	1:39.865	Serbia; Milica Starović; Dalma Ružičić-Benedek	1:41.075	Germany; Franziska Weber; Tina Dietze	1:41.335
K–2 1000 m	Germany; Sabrina Hering; Steffi Kriegerstein	3:37.646	Belarus; Sofiya Yurchanka; Aleksandra Grishina	3:38:699	Hungary; Alíz Sarudi; Dóra Bodonyi	3:41:089
K–4 500 m	Belarus; Marharyta Tsishkevich; Nadzeya Liapeshka; Volha Khudzenka; Maryna Litvinchuk	1:33.953	Hungary; Gabriella Szabó; Danuta Kozák; Krisztina Fazekas Zur; Anna Kárász	1:34.267	Germany; Franziska Weber; Conny Waßmuth; Verena Hantl; Tina Dietze	1:34.890

=== Paracanoe ===
==== Medal table ====
Rank	Nation	Gold	Silver	Bronze	Total
1	Australia	3	1	1	5
2	Brazil	3	0	4	7
3	Great Britain	2	5	0	7
4	Poland	1	2	0	3
5	Germany	1	1	1	3
6	United States	1	1	0	2
7	Austria	1	0	0	1
8	Russia	0	1	1	2
9	Spain	0	1	0	1
10	Hungary	0	0	2	2
11	France	0	0	1	1
11	Ukraine	0	0	1	1
Totals (12 entries)		12	12	11	35

Non-Paralympic classes

Event	Gold		Silver		Bronze	
Men's K–1 200 m KL1	Luis Carlos Cardoso da Silva (BRA)	50.863	Jakub Tokarz (POL)	52.533	Fernando Fernandes de Padua (BRA)	52.970
Men's K–1 200 m KL2	Markus Swoboda (AUT)	42.542	Curtis McGrath (AUS)	43.185	Fernando Rufino de Paulo (BRA)	43.415
Men's K–1 200 m KL3	Tom Kierey (GER)	39.270	Robert Oliver (GBR)	39.739	Leonid Krylov (RUS)	39.784
Men's V–1 200 m VL1	Luis Carlos Cardoso da Silva (BRA)	57.912	Jakub Tokarz (POL)	58.639	Robert Suba (HUN)	1:02.919
Men's V–1 200 m VL2	Curtis McGrath (AUS)	49.489	Javier Reja Muñoz (ESP)	52.205	Ivo Kilian (GER)	53.985
Men's V–1 200 m VL3	Caio Ribeiro de Carvalho (BRA)	50.656	Jonathan Young (GBR)	51.058	Daniel Geri (HUN)	52.311
Women's K–1 200 m KL1	Jeanette Chippington (GBR)	56.865	Edina Müller (GER)	57.513	Svitlana Kupriianova (UKR)	59.365
Women's K–1 200 m KL2	Emma Wiggs (GBR)	53.023	Nicola Paterson (GBR)	54.521	Susan Seipel (AUS)	55.616
Women's K–1 200 m KL3	Amanda Reynolds (AUS)	50.501	Anne Dickins (GBR)	50.521	Cindy Moreau (FRA)	50.951
Women's V–1 200 m VL1	Katarzyna Leskiewicz (POL)	1:15.299	Ann Yoshida (USA)	1:18.539	none awarded	
Women's V–1 200 m VL2	Susan Seipel (AUS)	59.916	Nadezda Andreeva (RUS)	1:04.289	Débora Benivides (BRA)	1:05.536
Women's V–1 200 m VL3	Anja Pierce (USA)	1:02.536	Frances Bateman (GBR)	1:03.208	Aline Souza Lopes (BRA)	1:05.432
