= 2017 Canoe Sprint European Championships =

International canoeing and kayaking event

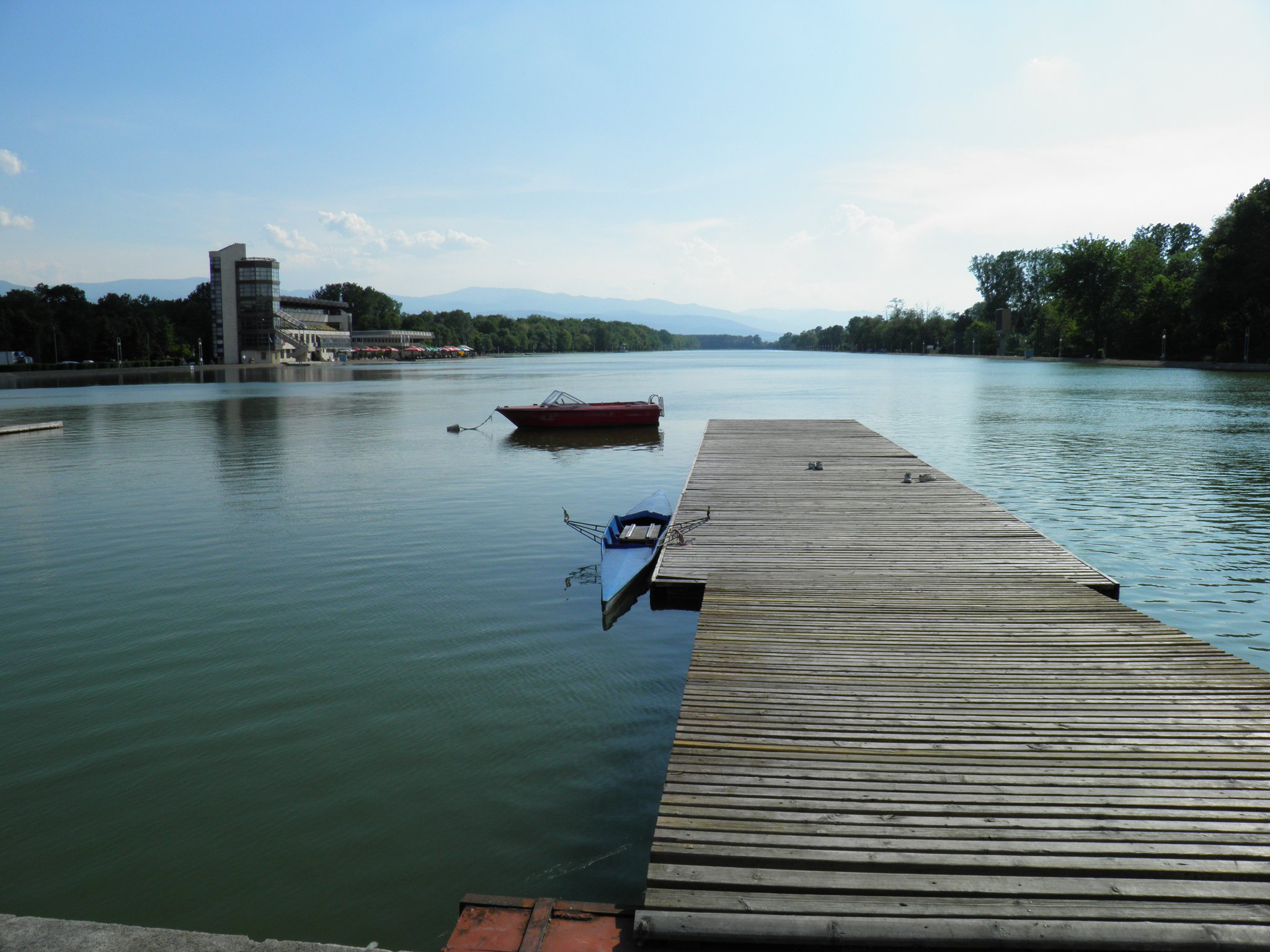
- Venue: Plovdiv regatta venue
- Location: Plovdiv, Bulgaria
- Start date: 14 July
- End date: 16 July

The 2017 Canoe Sprint European Championships is the 29th edition of the Canoe Sprint European Championships, an international sprint canoe/kayak and paracanoe event organised by the European Canoe Association, held in Plovdiv, Bulgaria, between 14 and 16 July 2017.

== Canoe sprint ==
=== Medal table ===
Rank	Nation	Gold	Silver	Bronze	Total
1	Hungary (HUN)	10	2	3	15
2	Germany (GER)	6	1	3	10
3	Russia (RUS)	3	3	5	11
4	Czech Republic (CZE)	2	1	0	3
5	Poland (POL)	1	4	4	9
6	Portugal (POR)	1	2	0	3
7	Spain (ESP)	1	1	2	4
8	Ukraine (UKR)	1	0	2	3
9	Great Britain (GBR)	1	0	1	2
10	Lithuania (LTU)	1	0	0	1
11	Belarus (BLR)	0	4	2	6
12	Serbia (SRB)	0	3	0	3
13	Denmark (DEN)	0	2	1	3
14	Slovakia (SVK)	0	1	1	2
14	Slovenia (SLO)	0	1	1	2
16	Moldova (MDA)	0	1	0	1
16	Romania (ROU)	0	1	0	1
18	France (FRA)	0	0	1	1
18	Georgia (GEO)	0	0	1	1
18	Italy (ITA)	0	0	1	1
18	Norway (NOR)	0	0	1	1
Totals (21 entries)		27	27	29	83

=== Men ===
Event	Gold	Time	Silver	Time	Bronze	Time
C-1 200 m	Henrikas Žustautas (LTU)	00:38.112	Alexey Korovashkov (RUS)	00:38.157	Zaza Nadiradze (GEO)	00:38.342
C-1 500 m	Martin Fuksa (CZE)	01:44.884 WB	Oleg Tarnovschi (MDA)	01:46.792	Tomasz Kaczor (POL)	01:47.148
C-1 1000 m	Sebastian Brendel (GER)	03:51.671	Martin Fuksa (CZE)	03:53.667	Kirill Shamshurin (RUS)	03:55.171
C-1 5000 m	Sebastian Brendel (GER)	21:45.710	David Varga (HUN)	21:49.320	Mateusz Kamiński (POL)	22:16.99
C-2 200 m	Russia; Aleksandr Kovalenko; Ivan Shtyl	00:35.627	Belarus; Andrei Bahdanovich; Dzianis Makhlai	00:36.137	Hungary; Jonatán Hajdu; Ádám Fekete	00:36.330
C-2 500 m	Russia; Viktor Melantyev; Ivan Shtyl	01:36.264	Romania; Leonid Carp; Victor Mihalachi	01:37.368	Ukraine; Dmytro Ianchuk; Taras Mishchuk	01:38.956
C-2 1000 m	Germany; Yul Oeltze; Peter Kretschmer	03:36.232	Russia; Viktor Melantyev; Vladislav Chebotar	03:37.300	Italy; Nicolae Craciun; Sergiu Craciun	03:38.312
C-4 1000 m	Poland; Wiktor Głazunow; Piotr Kuleta; Tomasz Barniak; Marcin Grzybowski	03:20.536	Germany; Conrad Scheibner; Sebastian Brendel; Stefan Kiraj; Jan Vandrey	03:21.848	Russia; Kirill Shamshurin; Ilia Shtokalov; Rasul Ishmukhamedov; Ilya Pervukhin	03:21.904
K-1 200 m (Note: Bence Horváth of Hungary, who originally clocked 33.455 for silver, was disqualified on 25 March 2018 after it emerged he tested positive for EPO on 12 June 2017.)	Liam Heath (GBR)	00:33.380 WB	Marko Dragosavljević (SRB)	00:33.947	Carlos Garrote (ESP) Maxime Beaumont (FRA)	00:34.057
K-1 500 m	Jakub Zavrel (CZE)	01:35.156 WB	Mikita Borykau (BLR)	01:35.252	Bálint Kopasz (HUN) René Poulsen (DEN)	01:35.432
K-1 1000 m	Fernando Pimenta (POR)	03:29.032	René Poulsen (DEN)	03:30.112	Bálint Kopasz (HUN)	03:30.336
K-1 5000 m	Max Hoff (GER)	19:21.220	Fernando Pimenta (POR)	19:22.640	Eivind Vold (NOR)	19:29.540
K-2 200 m	Hungary; Márk Balaska; Balázs Birkás	00:30.740	Russia; Kirill Lyapunov; Alexander Dyachenko	00:31.200	Germany; Ronald Rauhe; Max Lemke	00:31.365
K-2 500 m (Note: Igor Trunov of Ukraine was disqualified on 8 November 2017.)	Hungary; Bence Nádas; Sándor Tótka	01:26.500 WB	Serbia; Dejan Pajić; Ervin Holpert	01:27.616	Russia; Oleg Gusev; Vladislav Blintsov	01:29.200
K-2 1000 m	Germany; Max Hoff; Marcus Gross	03:12.724	Serbia; Marko Tomićević; Milenko Zorić	03:13.780	Spain; Francisco Cubelos; Íñigo Peña	03:14.056
K-4 500 m	Hungary; Bence Nádas; Péter Molnár; Sándor Tótka; Milán Mozgi	01:18.556	Slovakia; Denis Myšák; Juraj Tarr; Tibor Linka; Erik Vlček	01:18.640	Belarus; Raman Piatrushenka; Mikita Borykau; Dzmitry Tratsiakou; Vitaliy Bialko	01:19.112
K-4 1000 m	Spain; Francisco Cubelos; Javier Cabañín; Marcus Walz; Íñigo Peña	02:54.374	Poland; Martin Brzeziński; Rafał Rosolski; Bartosz Stabno; Norbert Kuczyński	02:54.658	Slovakia; Denis Myšák; Juraj Tarr; Tibor Linka; Erik Vlček	02:54.666

=== Women ===
Event	Gold	Time	Silver	Time	Bronze	Time
C-1 200 m	Olesia Romasenko (RUS)	00:45.804	Kincső Takács (HUN)	00:46.416	Alena Nazdrova (BLR)	00:47.080
C-2 500 m	Hungary; Virág Balla; Kincső Takács	02:00.224	Belarus; Alena Nazdrova; Kamila Bobr	02:01.364	Russia; Irina Andreeva; Olesia Romasenko	02:03.928
K-1 200 m	Dóra Lucz (HUN)	00:39.317	Emma Jørgensen (DEN)	00:39.357	Špela Ponomarenko (SLO)	00:39.697
K-1 500 m	Tamara Takács (HUN)	01:47.264	Volha Khudzenka (BLR)	01:47.844	Elena Anyshina (RUS)	01:47.908
K-1 1000 m	Dóra Bodonyi (HUN)	03:57.984	Beata Mikołajczyk (POL)	03:59.744	Rachel Cawthorn (GBR)	04:00.264
K-1 5000 m	Dóra Bodonyi (HUN)	21:40.570	Eva Barrios (ESP)	21:41.110	Tabea Medert (GER)	21:41.230
K-2 200 m	Ukraine; Mariia Kichasova; Anastasiya Horlova	00:36.527	Portugal; Joana Vasconcelos; Francisca Laia	00:36.777	Poland; Dominika Włodarczyk; Katarzyna Kołodziejczyk	00:37.117
K-2 500 m	Germany; Franziska Weber; Tina Dietze	01:38.604	Slovenia; Špela Ponomarenko; Anja Osterman	01:38.996	Poland; Beata Mikołajczyk; Anna Puławska	01:40.632
K-2 1000 m	Hungary; Réka Hagymási; Ramóna Farkasdi	03:43.048	Poland; Karolina Markiewicz; Julia Lis	03:44.888	Germany; Tabea Medert; Melanie Gebhardt	03:45.652
K-4 500 m	Hungary; Dóra Lucz; Tamara Takács; Erika Medveczky; Ninetta Vad	01:30.724	Poland; Dominika Włodarczyk; Beata Mikołajczyk; Anna Puławska; Katarzyna Kołodziejczyk	01:31.596	Ukraine; Mariia Kichasova; Anastasiia Todorova; Mariya Povkh; Inna Hryshchun	01:31.624

== Paracanoe ==
=== Medal table ===
Rank	Nation	Gold	Silver	Bronze	Total
1	Great Britain (GBR)	3	3	1	7
2	Ukraine (UKR)	2	1	0	3
3	Austria (AUT)	2	0	0	2
4	Hungary (HUN)	1	0	1	2
4	Italy (ITA)	1	0	1	2
6	France (FRA)	1	0	0	1
7	Russia (RUS)	0	4	5	9
8	Germany (GER)	0	1	1	2
9	Romania (ROU)	0	1	0	1
10	Sweden (SWE)	0	0	1	1
Totals (10 entries)		10	10	10	30

=== Medal events ===
Non-Paralympic classes

Event	Gold		Silver		Bronze	
Men's KL1	Italy; Esteban Farias	48.520	Great Britain; Ian Marsden	48.904	Hungary; Róbert Suba	49.760
Men's KL2	Austria; Marcus Swoboda	41.316	Ukraine; Mykola Syniuk	42.180	Great Britain; Nick Beighton	42.956
Men's KL3	Ukraine; Serhii Yemelianov	38.100	Great Britain; Robert Oliver	38.572	Russia; Leonid Krylov	38.644
Men's VL1	Hungary; Róbert Suba	1:03.928	Russia; Pavel Gromov	1:05.816	Russia; Artur Chuprov	1:14.764
Men's VL2	Austria; Marcus Swoboda	55.820	Germany; Ivo Kilian	55.976	Italy; Giuseppe di Lelio	56.216
Men's VL3	Great Britain; Jonathan Young	49.336	Russia; Victor Potanin	52.192	Russia; Aleksei Egorov	53.840
Women's KL1	Great Britain; Jeanette Chippington	58.584	Russia; Alexandra Dupik	1:00.072	Germany; Edina Müller	1:01.908
Women's KL2	Great Britain; Emma Wiggs	51.292	Great Britain; Charlotte Henshaw	54.092	Russia; Nadezda Andreeva	54.172
Women's KL3	France; Cindy Moreau	53.184	Romania; Mihaela Lulea	53.284	Sweden; Helene Ripa	54.940
Women's VL1	No entries					
Women's VL2	Ukraine; Nataliia Lagutenko	1:05.580	Russia; Maria Nikiforova	1:05.940	Russia; Nadezda Andreeva	1:08.212
Women's VL3	No entries					
