= Canoeing at the 2016 Summer Olympics – Men's K-4 1000 metres =

Men's canoe sprint K-4 1,000 metres at the Games of the XXXI Olympiad
- Venue: Lagoa Stadium
- Date: 19–20 August 2016
- Competitors: 56 from 14 nations
- Winning time: 3:02.143

Medalists
| 1st place, gold medalist(s) | | Max Rendschmidt; Tom Liebscher; Max Hoff; Marcus Gross | Germany |
| 2nd place, silver medalist(s) | | Denis Myšák; Erik Vlček; Juraj Tarr; Tibor Linka | Slovakia |
| 3rd place, bronze medalist(s) | | Daniel Havel; Lukáš Trefil; Josef Dostál; Jan Štěrba | Czech Republic |

The men's canoe sprint K-4 1,000 metres at the 2016 Olympic Games in Rio de Janeiro took place between 19 and 20 August at Lagoa Stadium.

The medals were presented by Danka Barteková, IOC member, Slovakia and Donald McKenzie, Board Member of the ICF.

It was the last appearance of the men's K-4 1000 metres. A shorter race, the men's K-4 500 metres, was held at Tokyo 2020.

== Competition format ==
The competition comprises heats, semifinals, and a final round. Heat winners advanced to the "A" final, with all other boats getting a second chance in the semifinals. The top three from each semifinal also advanced to the "A" final, and competed for medals. "B" final was held for the other semifinalists.

== Schedule ==
All times are Brasilia Time (UTC-03:00)

| Date | Time | Round |
|---|---|---|
| Friday, 19 August 2016 | 9:51; 10:51 | Heats; Semifinals |
| Saturday, 20 August 2016 | 10:04 | Finals |

== Results ==
=== Heats ===
The fastest boat qualified for the final, remainder to a semi-final.

==== Heat 1 ====
| Rank | Canoer | Country | Time | Notes |
|---|---|---|---|---|
| 1 | Max Rendschmidt; Tom Liebscher; Max Hoff; Marcus Gross | Germany | 2:52.836 | Q |
| 2 | Denis Myšák; Erik Vlček; Juraj Tarr; Tibor Linka | Slovakia | 2:55.628 | |
| 3 | Ken Wallace; Riley Fitzsimmons; Jacob Clear; Jordan Wood | Australia | 2:55.666 | |
| 4 | Fernando Pimenta; Emanuel Silva; João Ribeiro; David Fernandes | Portugal | 3:01.498 | |
| 5 | Arnaud Hybois; Étienne Hubert; Sébastien Jouve; Cyrille Carré | France | 3:02.376 | |
| 6 | Roberto Maehler; Vagner Souta; Celso Oliveira; Gilvan Ribeiro | Brazil | 3:04.804 | |
| 7 | Ilya Golendov; Andrey Yerguchyov; Sergii Tokarnytskyi; Alexandr Yemelyanov | Kazakhstan | 3:04.883 | |

==== Heat 2 ====
| Rank | Canoer | Country | Time | Notes |
|---|---|---|---|---|
| 1 | Daniel Havel; Lukáš Trefil; Josef Dostál; Jan Štěrba | Czech Republic | 2:52.027 | Q |
| 2 | Daniel Dal Bo; Juan Ignacio Cáceres; Gonzalo Carreras; Pablo de Torres | Argentina | 2:55.103 | |
| 3 | Javier Hernanz; Rodrigo Germade; Óscar Carrera; Íñigo Peña | Spain | 2:55.514 | |
| 4 | Kirill Lyapunov; Vasily Pogreban; Roman Anoshkin; Oleg Zhestkov | Russia | 2:56.662 | |
| 5 | Tibor Hufnágel; Benjámin Ceiner; Attila Kugler; Tamás Somorácz | Hungary | 3:00.369 | |
| 6 | Marko Tomićević; Milenko Zorić; Dejan Pajić; Vladimir Torubarov | Serbia | 3:05.272 | |
| 7 | Nicola Ripamonti; Giulio Dressino; Alberto Ricchetti; Mauro Crenna | Italy | 3:10.266 | |

=== Semifinals ===
Three fastest boats in each semifinal qualified for the 'A' final, remainder for the 'B' final

==== Semifinal 1 ====
| Rank | Canoer | Country | Time | Notes |
|---|---|---|---|---|
| 1 | Ken Wallace; Riley Fitzsimmons; Jacob Clear; Jordan Wood | Australia | 2:58.222 | FA |
| 2 | Fernando Pimenta; Emanuel Silva; João Ribeiro; David Fernandes | Portugal | 2:58.233 | FA |
| 3 | Marko Tomićević; Milenko Zorić; Dejan Pajić; Vladimir Torubarov | Serbia | 2:59.636 | FA |
| 4 | Ilya Golendov; Andrey Yerguchyov; Sergii Tokarnytskyi; Alexandr Yemelyanov | Kazakhstan | 3:00.592 | FB |
| 5 | Tibor Hufnágel; Benjámin Ceiner; Attila Kugler; Tamás Somorácz | Hungary | 3:00.645 | FB |
| 6 | Daniel Dal Bo; Juan Ignacio Cáceres; Gonzalo Carreras; Pablo de Torres | Argentina | 3:00.952 | FB |

==== Semifinal 2 ====
| Rank | Canoer | Country | Time | Notes |
|---|---|---|---|---|
| 1 | Denis Myšák; Erik Vlček; Juraj Tarr; Tibor Linka | Slovakia | 2:59.362 | FA |
| 2 | Javier Hernanz; Rodrigo Germade; Óscar Carrera; Íñigo Peña | Spain | 3:00.237 | FA |
| 3 | Arnaud Hybois; Étienne Hubert; Sébastien Jouve; Cyrille Carré | France | 3:00.896 | FA |
| 4 | Kirill Lyapunov; Vasily Pogreban; Roman Anoshkin; Oleg Zhestkov | Russia | 3:01.065 | FB |
| 5 | Nicola Ripamonti; Giulio Dressino; Alberto Ricchetti; Mauro Crenna | Italy | 3:03.868 | FB |
| 6 | Roberto Maehler; Vagner Souta; Celso Oliveira; Gilvan Ribeiro | Brazil | 3:09.220 | FB |

=== Finals ===
==== Final B ====
| Rank | Canoer | Country | Time | Notes |
|---|---|---|---|---|
| 1 | Kirill Lyapunov; Vasily Pogreban; Roman Anoshkin; Oleg Zhestkov | Russia | 3:06.825 | |
| 2 | Ilya Golendov; Andrey Yerguchyov; Sergii Tokarnytskyi; Alexandr Yemelyanov | Kazakhstan | 3:08.715 | |
| 3 | Tibor Hufnágel; Benjámin Ceiner; Attila Kugler; Tamás Somorácz | Hungary | 3:10.388 | |
| 4 | Daniel Dal Bo; Juan Ignacio Cáceres; Gonzalo Carreras; Pablo de Torres | Argentina | 3:12.621 | |
| 5 | Roberto Maehler; Vagner Souta; Celso Oliveira; Gilvan Ribeiro | Brazil | 3:13.337 | |
| 6 | Nicola Ripamonti; Giulio Dressino; Alberto Ricchetti; Mauro Crenna | Italy | 3:14.399 | |

==== Final A ====
| Rank | Canoer | Country | Time | Notes |
|---|---|---|---|---|
| 1st place, gold medalist(s) | Max Rendschmidt; Tom Liebscher; Max Hoff; Marcus Gross | Germany | 3:02.143 | |
| 2nd place, silver medalist(s) | Denis Myšák; Erik Vlček; Juraj Tarr; Tibor Linka | Slovakia | 3:05.044 | |
| 3rd place, bronze medalist(s) | Daniel Havel; Lukáš Trefil; Josef Dostál; Jan Štěrba | Czech Republic | 3:05.176 | |
| 4 | Ken Wallace; Riley Fitzsimmons; Jacob Clear; Jordan Wood | Australia | 3:06.731 | |
| 5 | Javier Hernanz; Rodrigo Germade; Óscar Carrera; Íñigo Peña | Spain | 3:06.768 | |
| 6 | Fernando Pimenta; Emanuel Silva; João Ribeiro; David Fernandes | Portugal | 3:07.482 | |
| 7 | Arnaud Hybois; Étienne Hubert; Sébastien Jouve; Cyrille Carré | France | 3:07.488 | |
| 8 | Marko Tomićević; Milenko Zorić; Dejan Pajić; Vladimir Torubarov | Serbia | 3:10.241 | |
