= Oleg Zhestkov =

Russian canoeist

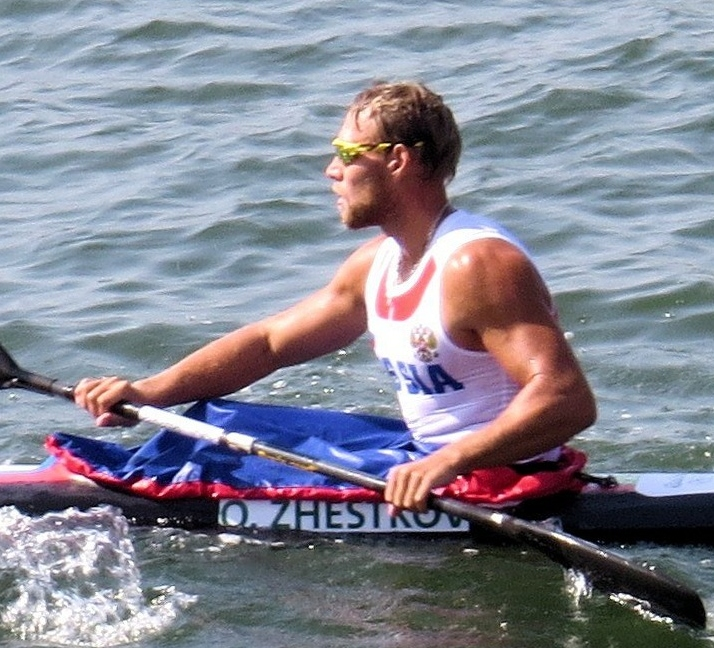
- Zhestkov at the 2016 Olympics

Personal information
- Full name: Oleg Aleksandrovich Zhestkov
- Born: 20 January 1987 (age 39) Omsk, Russian SFSR, Soviet Union
- Height: 188 cm (6 ft 2 in)
- Weight: 98 kg (216 lb)

Sport
- Country: Russia
- Sport: Canoe sprint
- Club: Dynamo
- Coached by: Alexander Shishkin; V.S. Mikhailovsky; Alexander Zhdanov (national)
Medal record
Representing Russia
World Championships
Bronze medal – third place	2011 Szeged	K–4 1000 m
Gold medal – first place	2013 Duisburg	K–4 1000 m
European Championships
Silver medal – second place	2016 Moscow	K–4 1000 m
Summer Universiade
Gold medal – first place	2013 Kazan	K–4 500 m
Gold medal – first place	2013 Kazan	K–4 1000 m

Oleg Aleksandrovich Zhestkov (Russian: Олег Александрвоич Жестков; born 20 January 1987) is a Russian sprint canoeist who competes in the four-man K-4 1000 m event. He won the world title in 2013, placing third in 2011, and had a silver medal at the 2016 European Championships. His teams finished seventh at the 2012 and ninth at the 2016 Olympics.

In March 2019 Zhestkov tested positive for the banned substance EPO, receiving a four-year ban.

Zhestkov was born in Omsk, but later moved to Krasnodar. He took up kayaking following his two brothers, his mother and his cousin.
