= Óscar Carrera =

Spanish canoeist

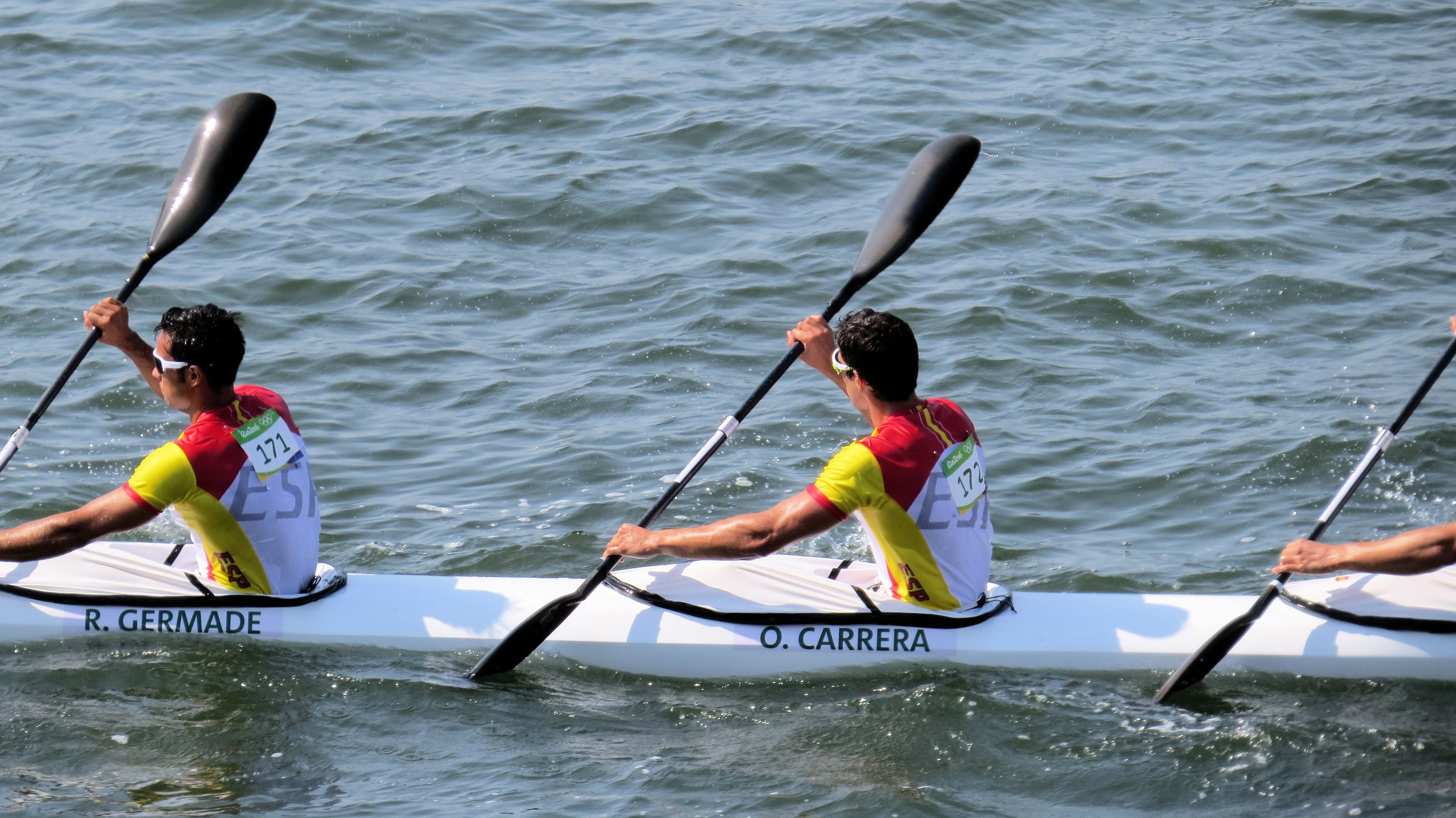
- Carrera (right) in 2016

Personal information
- Nationality: Spanish
- Born: 9 May 1991 (age 35)

Sport
- Sport: Canoeing

Óscar Carrera (born 9 May 1991) is a Spanish sprint canoer.

He competed at the 2016 Summer Olympics in Rio de Janeiro, in the men's K-4 1000 metres.
