= Denys Kamerylov =

Ukrainian canoeist

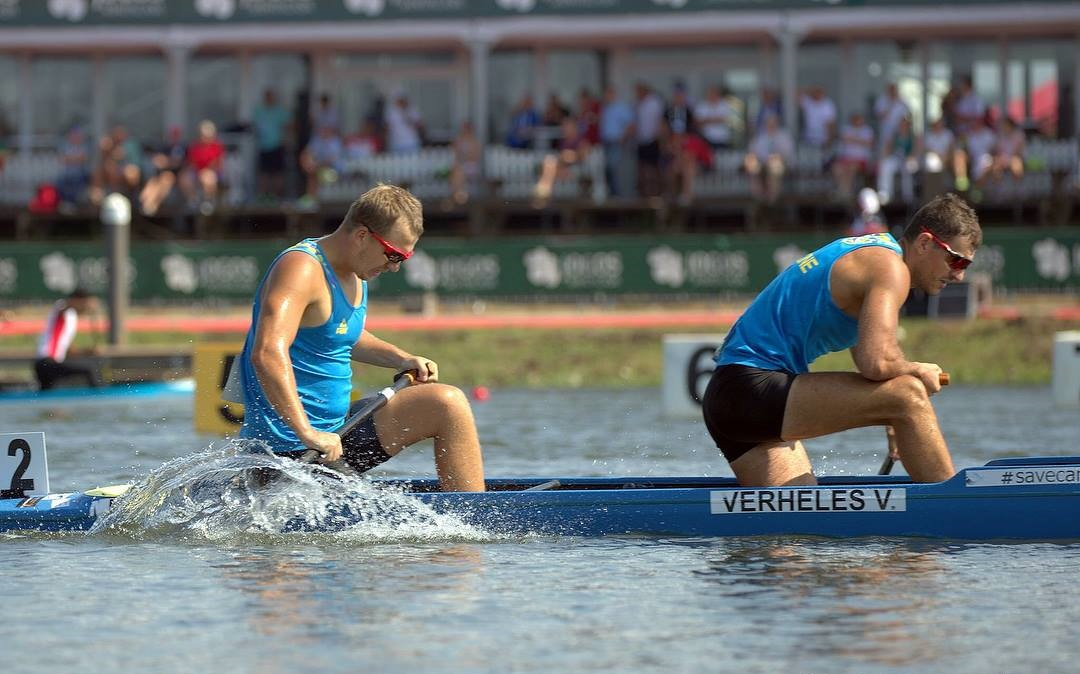
- 2016 European Championships

Personal information
- Born: 24 July 1989 (age 36) Poltava, Ukraine
- Height: 181 cm (5 ft 11 in)
- Weight: 82 kg (181 lb)
Medal record
Men's canoe sprint
Representing Ukraine
World Championships
Silver medal – second place	2015 Milan	C-2 500 m
Bronze medal – third place	2017 Račice	C-4 1000 m
European Championships
Silver medal – second place	2016 Moscow	C-4 1000 m
Bronze medal – third place	2012 Zagreb	C-2 500 m
Bronze medal – third place	2013 Montemor-o-Velho	C-4 1000 m
Bronze medal – third place	2016 Moscow	C-2 500 m
Universiade
Gold medal – first place	2013 Kazan	C-4 1000 m
Silver medal – second place	2013 Kazan	C-4 500 m
European Youth Olympic Festival
Gold medal – first place	2005 Lignano Sabbiadoro	C-2 500 m
Bronze medal – third place	2005 Lignano Sabbiadoro	C-2 1000 m

Denys Kamerylov (Ukrainian: Денис Олегович Камерилов; born 24 June 1989) is a Ukrainian sprint canoer. He is a silver medalists of the World Championships and medalist of the European Championships.
