= Kirill Lyapunov =

Russian canoeist

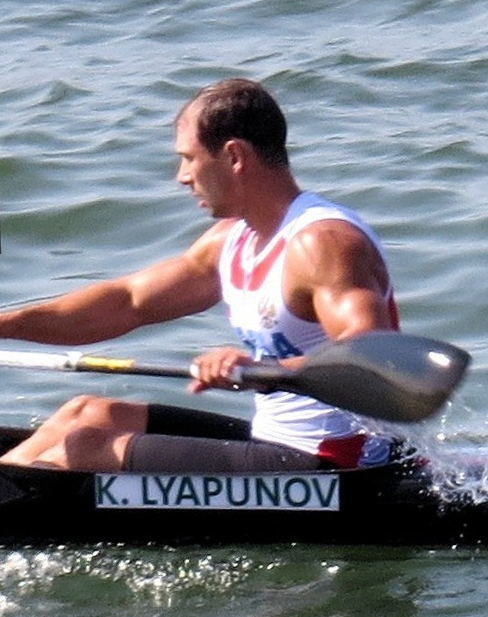
- Lyapunov at the 2016 Olympics

Personal information
- Born: 24 March 1986 (age 40) Moscow, Russian SFSR, Soviet Union
- Education: Russian State University of Physical Education, Sport, Youth and Tourism
- Height: 180 cm (5 ft 11 in)
- Weight: 81 kg (179 lb)

Sport
- Sport: Canoe sprint
- Club: CSKA
- Coached by: V. N. Korneyev; A. S. Samokhotsky; Alexander Zhdanov (national)
Medal record
Representing Russia
European Championships
Silver medal – second place	2016 Moscow	K-4 1000 m
Silver medal – second place	2017 Plovdiv	K-2 200 m

Kirill Igorevich Lyapunov (Russian: Кирилл Игоревич Ляпунов, born 24 March 1986) is a Russian canoeist. Competing in the four-man K-4 1000 m event he won a silver medal at the 2016 European Championships and placed ninth at the Rio Olympics.
