= Tamás Somorácz =

Hungarian canoeist

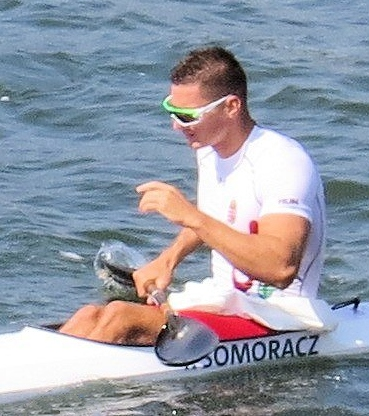
- Somorácz at the 2016 Olympics

Personal information
- Born: 11 April 1992 (age 34) Szekszárd, Hungary
- Height: 195 cm (6 ft 5 in)
- Weight: 92 kg (203 lb)

Sport
- Sport: Canoe sprint
- Club: Atomeromu Sportegyesulet
- Coached by: Krisztian Tokar (club); Botond Storcz (national)
Medal record
Representing Hungary
World Championships
Bronze medal – third place	2015 Milan	K-2 500 m
European Championships
Gold medal – first place	2016 Moscow	K-4 500 m

Tamás Somorácz (born 11 April 1992) is a Hungarian canoeist. He won the 2016 European title in the K-4 500 m and a bronze medal at the 2015 World Championships in the K-2 500 m event. His team finished 11th in the K-4 1000 metres event at the 2016 Summer Olympics.

Somorácz began paddling aged eight in Paks, following his father and brother. They did canoeing, but it did not work with Tamás, and he changed to kayak.
