= Irina Andreeva =

Russian sprint canoeist (born 1994)

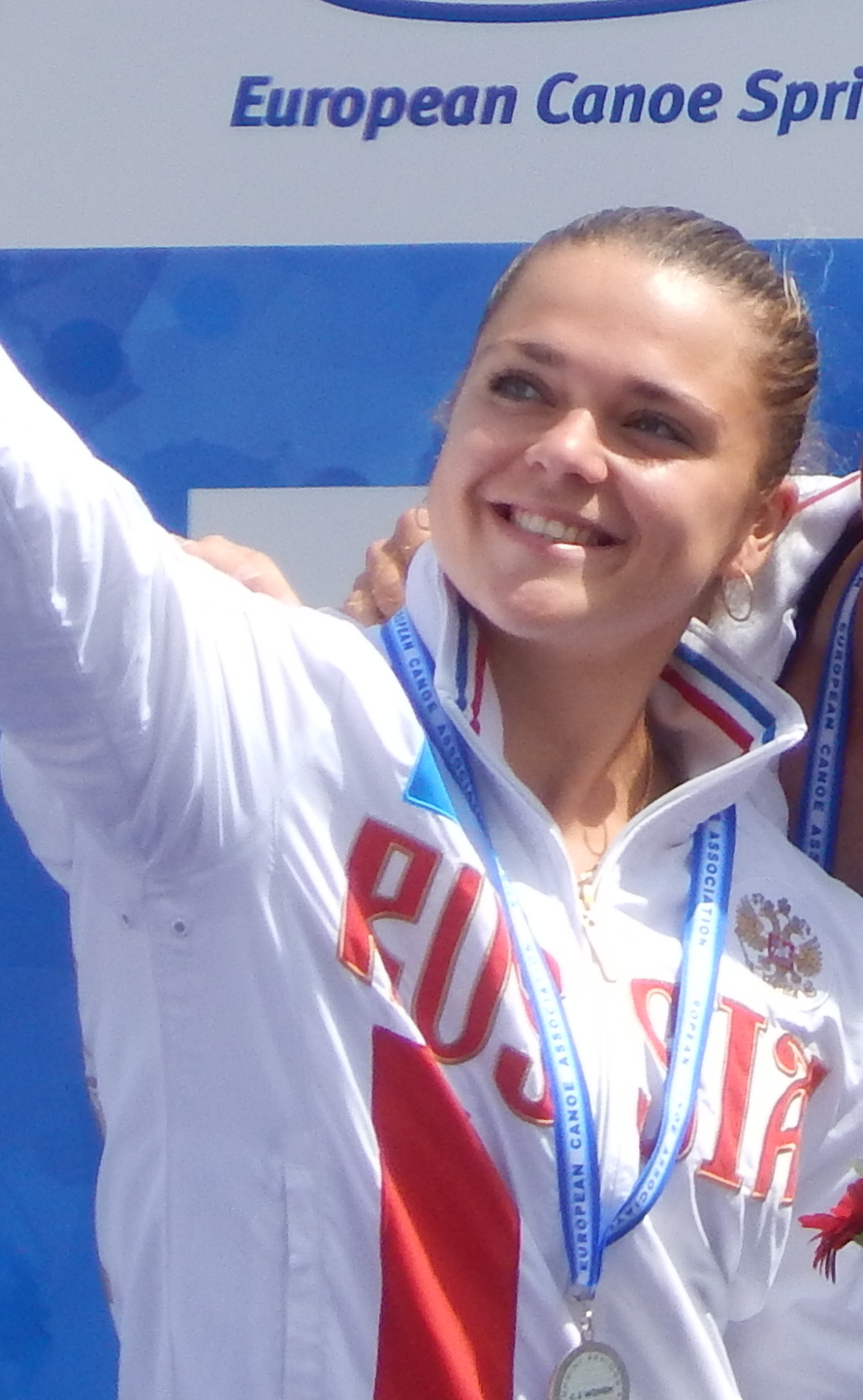
- Andreeva in Moscow, 2016

Personal information
- Nationality: Russian
- Born: 26 September 1994 (age 31) Moscow, Russia

Sport
- Country: Russia
- Sport: Canoe sprint
Medal record
Women's canoe sprint
Representing Russia
World Championships
| Gold medal – first place | 2021 Copenhagen | C-2 Mix 200 m |
| Silver medal – second place | 2017 Račice | C-2 500 m |
European Championships
| Gold medal – first place | 2021 Poznań | C-2 200 m |
| Silver medal – second place | 2016 Moscow | C-2 500 m |
| Bronze medal – third place | 2014 Brandenburg | C-1 200 m |
| Bronze medal – third place | 2015 Račice | C-1 200 m |
| Bronze medal – third place | 2015 Račice | C-2 500 m |
| Bronze medal – third place | 2017 Plovdiv | C-2 500 m |
| Bronze medal – third place | 2018 Belgrade | C-2 200 m |
| Bronze medal – third place | 2018 Belgrade | C-2 500 m |

Irina Alexandrovna Andreeva (Russian: Ирина Александровна Андреева; born 26 September 1994) is a Russian sprint canoeist.

She won a silver medal at the 2017 ICF Canoe Sprint World Championships and eight medals at the Canoe Sprint European Championships between 2014 and 2021. She also competed in two events at the 2020 Summer Olympics, held in Tokyo.
