= David Fernandes =

Portuguese sprint canoer

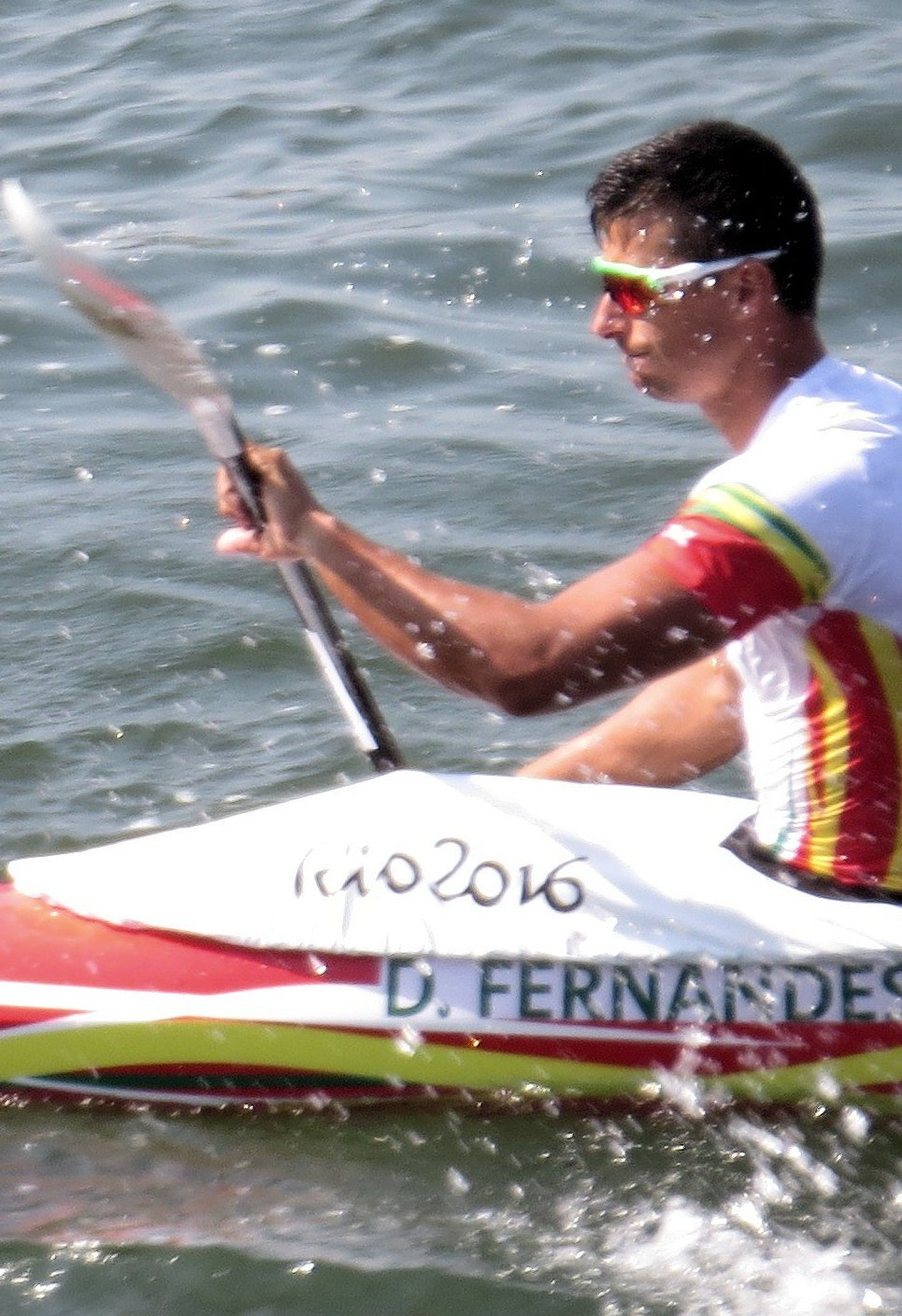
- Fernandes at the 2016 Summer Olympics

Personal information
- Nationality: Portuguese
- Born: 8 September 1983 (age 42)

Sport
- Sport: Canoeing

David Fernandes (born 8 September 1983) is a Portuguese sprint canoer.

He competed at the 2016 Summer Olympics in Rio de Janeiro, in the men's K-4 1000 metres.
