= Rafał Rosolski =

Polish canoeist (born 1991)

Personal information
- Born: 27 May 1991 (age 35) Gorzów Wielkopolski, Poland

Sport
- Sport: Canoe sprint
Medal record
Men's canoe sprint
Representing Poland
European Championships
Silver medal – second place	2017 Plovdiv	K-4 1000 m
Bronze medal – third place	2016 Moscow	K-4 1000 m
Bronze medal – third place	2022 Munich	K-1 5000 m

Rafał Rosolski (born 27 May 1991) is a Polish canoeist. He competed in the men's K-1 1000 metres event at the 2016 Summer Olympics.
