= Sabrina Hering =

German canoeist (born 1992)

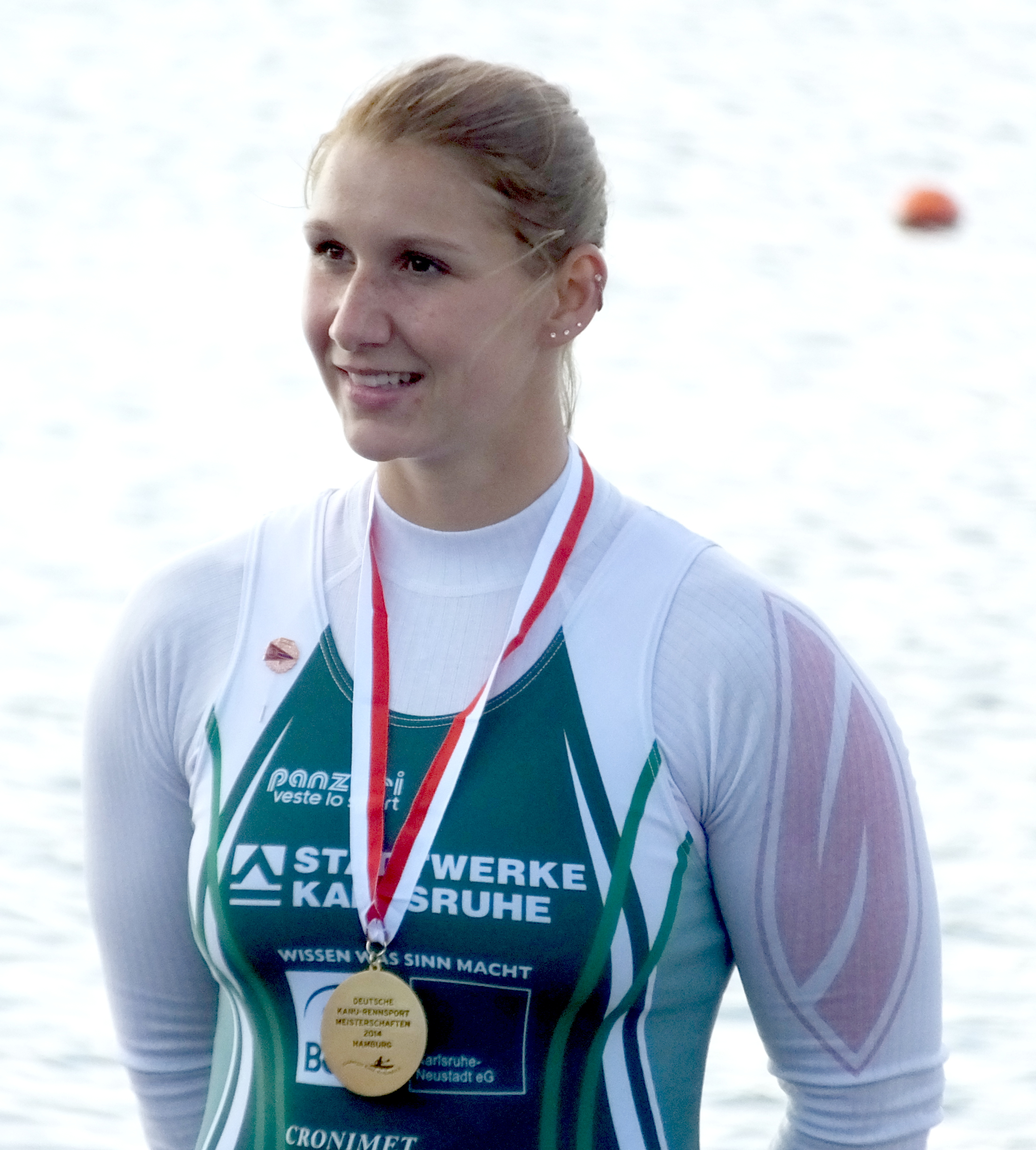
- Sabrina Hering in 2014

Personal information
- Nationality: German
- Born: 16 February 1992 (age 34)
- Height: 167 cm (5 ft 6 in)
- Weight: 70 kg (154 lb)

Sport
- Sport: Canoe sprint
Medal record
Women's canoe sprint
Representing Germany
Olympic Games
Silver medal – second place	2016 Rio de Janeiro	K-4 500 m
World Championships
Silver medal – second place	2017 Račice	K-4 500 m

Sabrina Hering (born 16 February 1992) is a German canoeist. She competed in the women's K-4 500 metres event at the 2016 Summer Olympics where the team won a silver medal. She qualified for the 2020 Summer Olympics, in the Women's K-4 500 metres.

== Career ==
In 2008, she was European Junior Champion in the K-2 500 meters, and in 2009 she was Junior World Champion in the K-2 500 meters. She competed in 2014 European Championships in Brandenburg an der Havel, where she won bronze in the K-2 1000 meters, together with Steffi Kriegerstein. At the 2014 World Championships in Moscow, she finished fifth in the K-2 500 meters, and sixth place in the K-4 200 meters. A year later, she won the 2015 World Championships in Milan together with Steffi Kriegerstein in the K-2 1000 meters, and K-2 200 meters, winning the bronze medal.

She competed at the 2016 European Championships in Moscow, in K-2 500 meters, taking second place, behind Gabriella Szabó and Danuta Kozák. In the 2016 Summer Olympics in the K-4 500 meters together with Tina Dietze, Steffi Kriegerstein and Franziska Weber, she won a silver medal. She was awarded the Silver Laurel Leaf, on 1 November 2016.

At the 2017 World Championships in Račice u Štětí, she won silver in the K-4 500 meters. Sabrina Hering also competed in the K-1 500 meters and finished fourth.
