= Sándor Tótka =

Hungarian canoeist (born 1994)

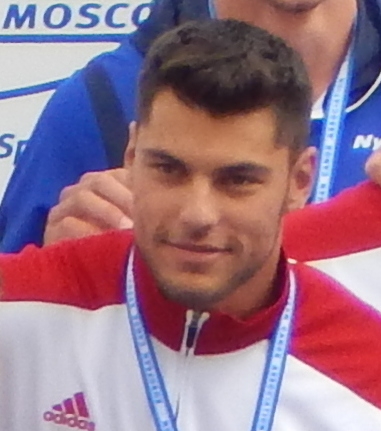
- Totka at ECH 2016

Personal information
- Born: 27 July 1994 (age 32) Mezőtúr, Hungary
- Height: 188 cm (6 ft 2 in)
- Weight: 84 kg (185 lb)

Sport
- Country: Hungary
- Sport: Canoe sprint
- Club: Újpesti TE
Medal record
Men's canoe sprint
Representing Hungary
Olympic Games
Gold medal – first place	2020 Tokyo	K-1 200 m
Silver medal – second place	2024 Paris	K-2 500 m
World Championships
Gold medal – first place	2014 Moscow	K-1 200 m relay
Gold medal – first place	2015 Milan	K-2 200 m
Silver medal – second place	2017 Račice	K-2 500 m
Silver medal – second place	2023 Duisburg	K-4 500 m
Bronze medal – third place	2013 Duisburg	K-1 200 m relay
Bronze medal – third place	2018 Montemor-o-Velho	K-4 500 m
European Championships
Gold medal – first place	2016 Moscow	K-4 500 m
Gold medal – first place	2017 Plovdiv	K-2 500 m
Gold medal – first place	2017 Plovdiv	K-4 500 m
Gold medal – first place	2021 Poznań	K-1 200 m
Gold medal – first place	2024 Szeged	K-2 500 m
Gold medal – first place	2026 Montemor-o-Velho	K-4 500 m
Bronze medal – third place	2018 Belgrade	K-1 200 m relay
European Games
Bronze medal – third place	2015 Baku	K-2 200 m
Youth Olympic Games
Gold medal – first place	2010 Singapore	K1 sprint

Sándor Tótka (born 27 July 1994) is a Hungarian canoeist, Olympic champion in men's K-1 200m at the 2020 Summer Olympics, and silver medalist in men's K-2 500m at the 2024 Summer Olympics. He competed in the men's K-2 200 metres event at the 2016 Summer Olympics.

== See also ==
- List of Youth Olympic Games gold medalists who won Olympic gold medals
