= Jan Štěrba =

Czech canoeist

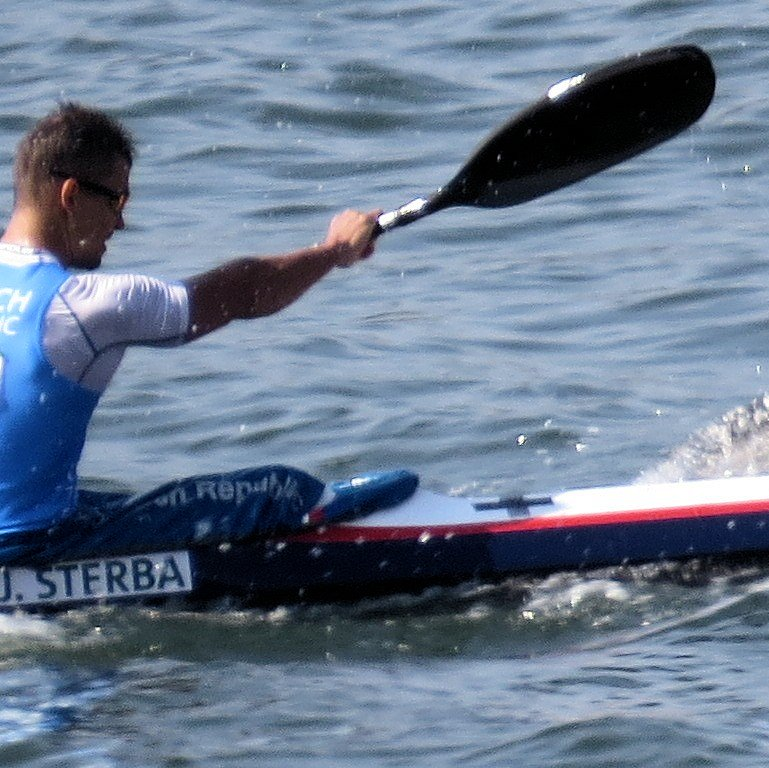
- Štěrba in Rio de Janeiro, 2016

Personal information
- Born: 1 June 1981 (age 45) Prague
Medal record
Men's sprint canoeing
Representing Czech Republic
Olympic Games
Bronze medal – third place	2012 London	K-4 1000 m
Bronze medal – third place	2016 Rio de Janeiro	K-4 1000 m
World Championships
Gold medal – first place	2014 Moscow	K-4 1000 m
Silver medal – second place	2013 Duisburg	K-4 1000 m
Bronze medal – third place	2010 Poznań	K-4 1000 m
Bronze medal – third place	2015 Milan	K-4 1000 m
Bronze medal – third place	2017 Račice	K-4 500 m
European Championships
Gold medal – first place	2015 Račice	K-4 1000 m
Gold medal – first place	2013 Montemor-o-Velho	K-4 1000 m
Gold medal – first place	2014 Brandenburg	K-4 1000 m
Bronze medal – third place	2015 Račice	K-2 1000 m
Bronze medal – third place	2013 Montemor-o-Velho	K-2 1000 m

Jan Štĕrba (Czech pronunciation: [ˈjan ˈʃcɛrba]; born 1 June 1981 in Prague) is a Czech sprint canoeist who has competed since the late 2000s. He won the bronze medal in the K-4 1000 m event at the 2010 ICF Canoe Sprint World Championships in Poznań.
