= Diego Cosgaya =

Spanish sprint canoer

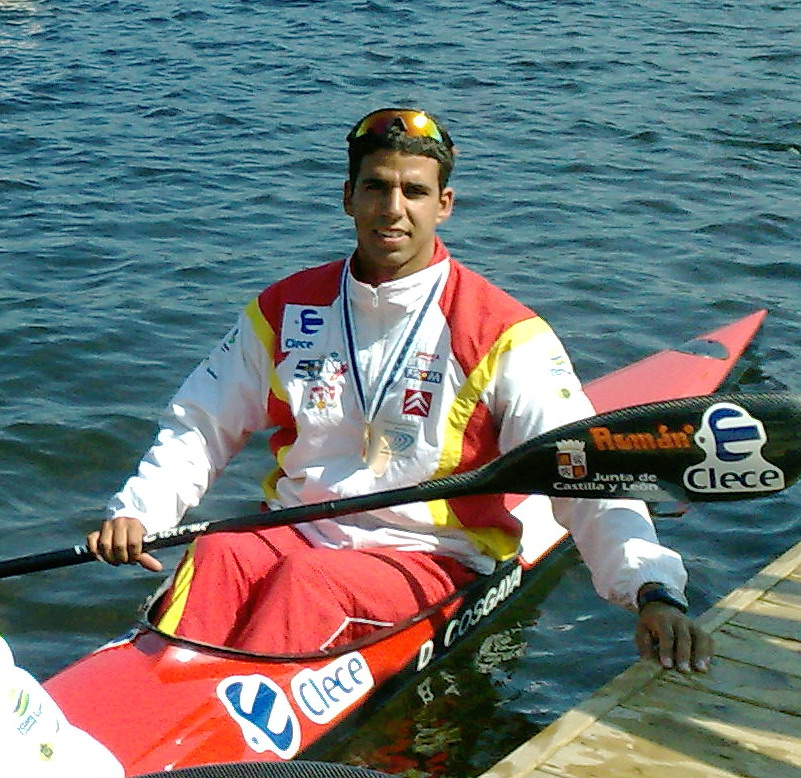
- Cosgaya at the 2009 championships

Personal information
- Nationality: Spanish
- Born: 27 January 1987 (age 39) Palencia, Spain
Medal record
World Championships
Gold medal – first place	2009 Dartmouth	K-2 1000 m
Silver medal – second place	2015 Milan	K-2 500 m
Mediterranean Games
Bronze medal – third place	2013 Mersin	K-2 1000 m

Diego Cosgaya (born 27 January 1987) is a Spanish sprint canoer who has competed since the late 2000s. He won a gold medal in the K-2 1000 m event at the 2009 ICF Canoe Sprint World Championships in Dartmouth, Nova Scotia.
