= Denis Myšák =

Slovak canoeist

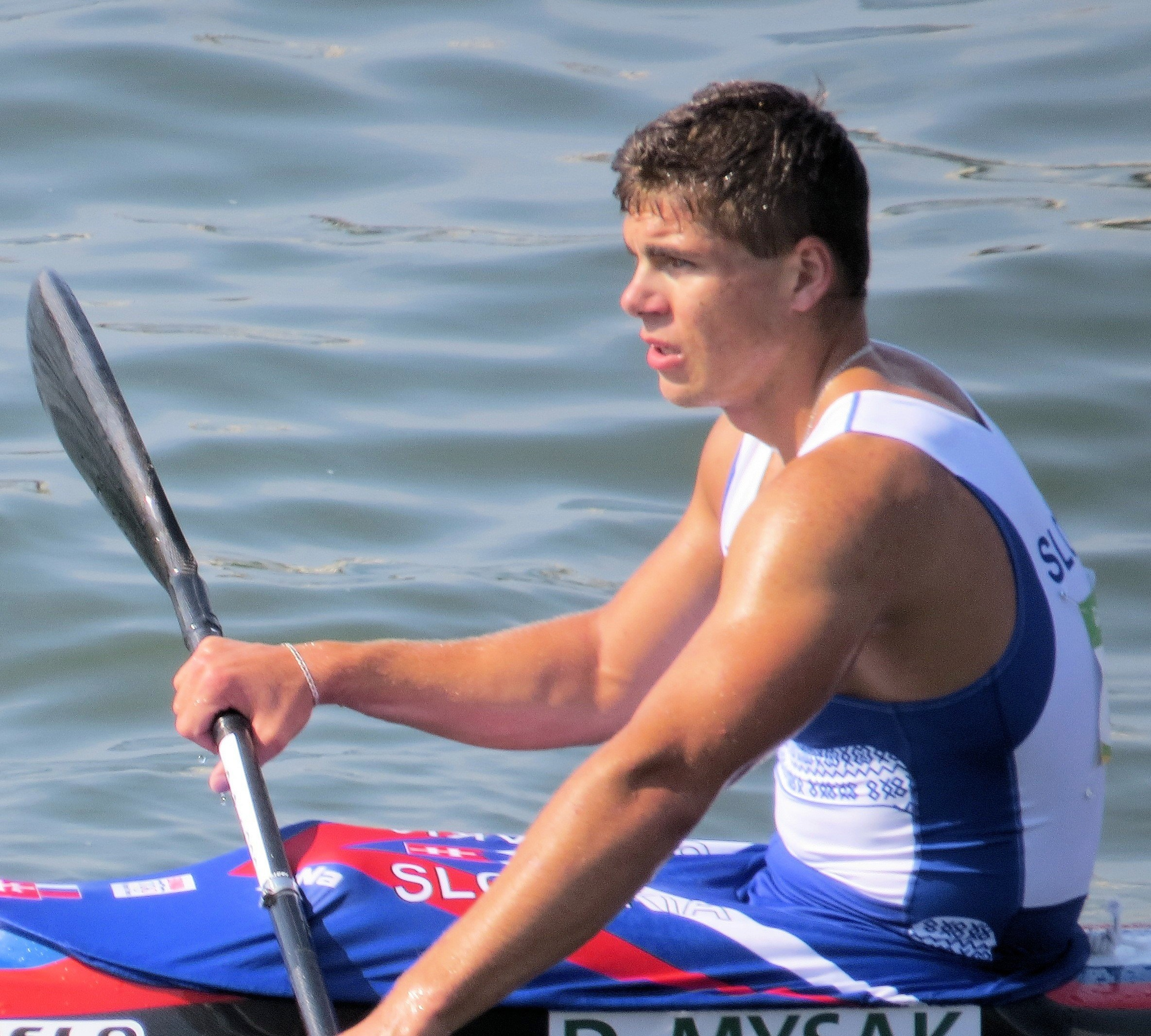
- Myšák at the 2016 Summer Olympics

Personal information
- Nationality: Slovak
- Born: 30 November 1995 (age 30) Bojnice, Slovakia
- Height: 1.89 m (6 ft 2 in)
- Weight: 92 kg (203 lb)

Sport
- Country: Slovakia
- Sport: Sprint kayak
- Club: SKP Bratislava; KRK Novaky
- Coached by: Andrej Wiebauer
Medal record
Event	1st	2nd	3rd
Olympic Games	0	1	1
World Championships	1	1	2
European Championships	1	4	1
Total	2	6	4
Men's sprint kayak
Representing Slovakia
Olympic Games
Silver medal – second place	2016 Rio de Janeiro	K-4 1000 m
Bronze medal – third place	2020 Tokyo	K-4 500 m
World Championships
Gold medal – first place	2015 Milan	K-4 1000 m
Silver medal – second place	2021 Copenhagen	K-4 500 m
Bronze medal – third place	2019 Szeged	K-4 1000 m
Bronze medal – third place	2021 Copenhagen	K-2 500 m
European Championships
Gold medal – first place	2016 Moscow	K-4 1000 m
Silver medal – second place	2016 Moscow	K-4 500 m
Silver medal – second place	2017 Plovdiv	K-4 500 m
Silver medal – second place	2021 Poznań	K-4 500 m
Silver medal – second place	2022 Munich	K-4 500 m
Bronze medal – third place	2017 Plovdiv	K-4 1000 m

Denis Myšák (born 30 November 1995) is a Slovak sprint canoeist. He competes in K-4 events and won a gold medal at the 2015 World Championships and a silver medal at the 2016 Summer Olympics.

== Career ==
He took up the sport at age eight. Because of his successes in junior category, he was named Slovak Junior Kayaker of the Year in 2012 and 2013. At the 2013 European Junior and U23 Championships he won a gold medal in K-2 500 metres junior race with Tibor Linka. Next year, again with Linka, they finished second in the U23 race. In 2015 he became part of Slovak K-4 team, which had won many medals at the Olympic Games, World and European Championships. With Erik Vlček, Juraj Tarr and Tibor Linka, they won K-4 1000 metres race at the 2015 World Championships. In 2016, the same team won one gold and one silver medal at the 2016 European Championships, showing good form before the main objective of the season, the Olympic Games, where they competed in the K-4 1000 m category as the reigning World Champions and won the silver medal.

== Other activities ==
Denis Myšák is representing the Slovak Republic in the 2021 Mister Globe Pageant on 20 June 2021.
