= Oleg Gusev (canoeist) =

Russian canoeist (born 1996)

Personal information
- Nationality: Russian
- Born: 24 April 1996 (age 30) Ryazan, Russia

Sport
- Sport: Canoe sprint
Medal record
Men's canoe sprint
Representing Russia
European Games
Gold medal – first place	2019 Minsk	K-4 500 m
European Championships
Bronze medal – third place	2016 Moscow	K-4 500 m
Bronze medal – third place	2017 Plovdiv	K-2 500 m
Bronze medal – third place	2021 Poznań	K-4 500 m
Bronze medal – third place	2021 Poznań	K-4 1000 m

Oleg Vladimirovich Gusev (Russian: Олег Владимирович Гусев; born 24 April 1996) is a Russian canoeist. He competed in the men's K-1 200 metres event at the 2020 Summer Olympics.
