= Dejan Pajić =

Serbian canoeist (born 1989)

Personal information
- Born: 15 August 1989 (age 36) Šabac, SR Serbia, Yugoslavia
Medal record
Men's canoe sprint
Representing Serbia
World Championships
Bronze medal – third place	2010 Poznań	K-2 500 m
European Championships
Silver medal – second place	2012 Zagreb	K-2 500 m
Bronze medal – third place	2015 Račice	K-1 500 m
Bronze medal – third place	2017 Plovdiv	K-2 500 m
Mediterranean Games
Bronze medal – third place	2009 Pescara	K-2 1000 m
European U23 Championships
Silver medal – second place	2012 Montemor-o-Velho	K-2 1000 m
Silver medal – second place	2012 Montemor-o-Velho	K-2 500 m

Dejan Pajić (Serbian Cyrillic: Дејан Пајић, born 15 August 1989) is a Serbian sprint canoer who has competed since the late 2000s. He won a bronze medal in the K-2 500 m event at the 2010 ICF Canoe Sprint World Championships in Poznań.
