= Vladislav Blintsov =

Russian canoeist (born 1996)

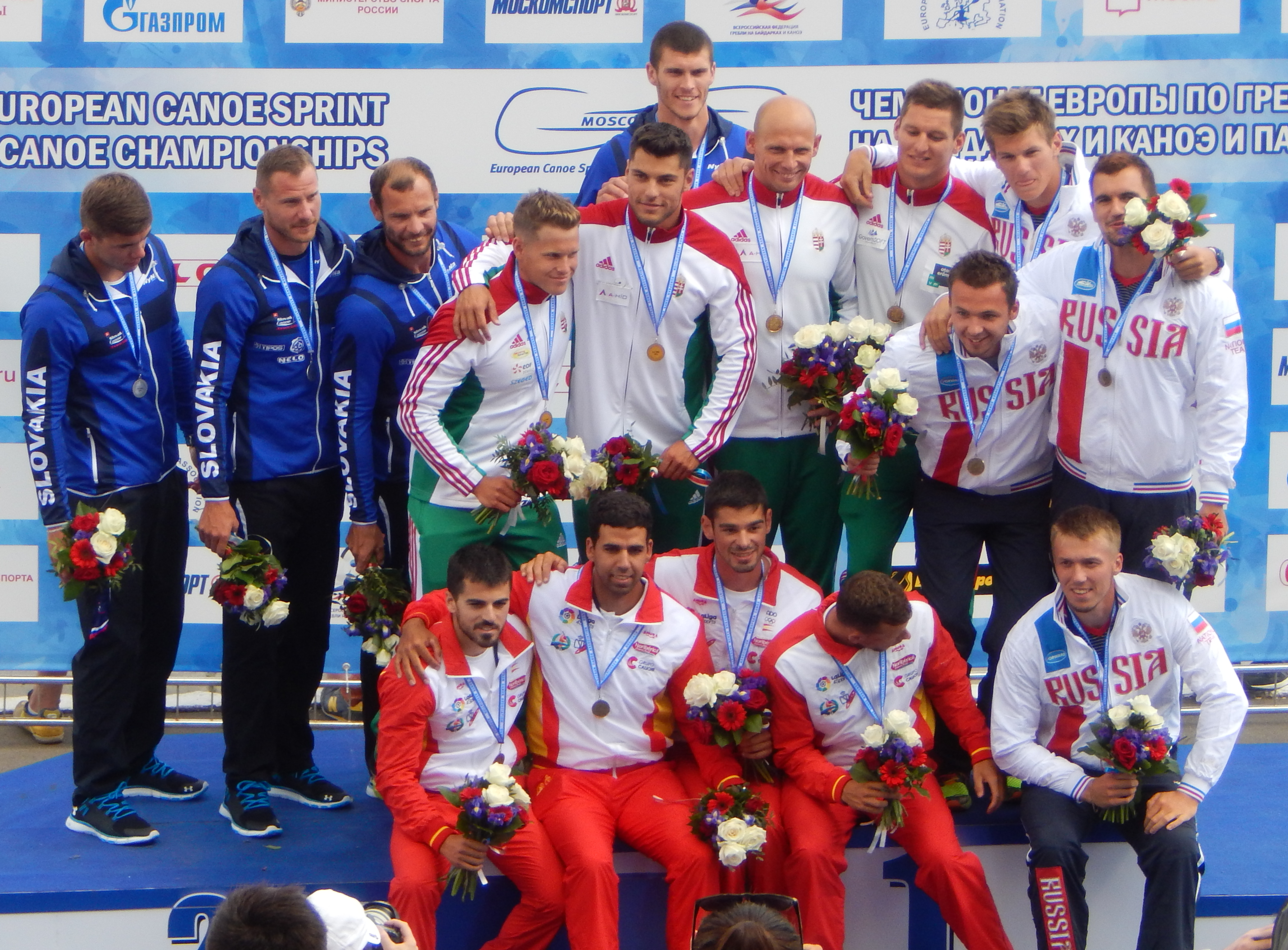

Personal information
- Nationality: Russian
- Born: 5 April 1996 (age 30)
- Height: 1.82 m (6 ft 0 in)
- Weight: 92 kg (203 lb)

Sport
- Country: Russia
- Sport: Canoe sprint
- Event: Kayaking
Medal record
World Championships
Gold medal – first place	2018 Montemor-o-Velho	K-2 500 m
European Games
Silver medal – second place	2015 Baku	K-4 1000 m
European Championships
Bronze medal – third place	2016 Moscow	K-4 500 m
Bronze medal – third place	2017 Plovdiv	K-2 500 m

Vladislav Aleksandrovich Blintsov (Russian: Владислав Александрович Блинцов; born 5 April 1996) is a Russian sprint canoeist.

He participated at the 2018 ICF Canoe Sprint World Championships.
