= Steffi Kriegerstein =

German canoeist (born 1992)

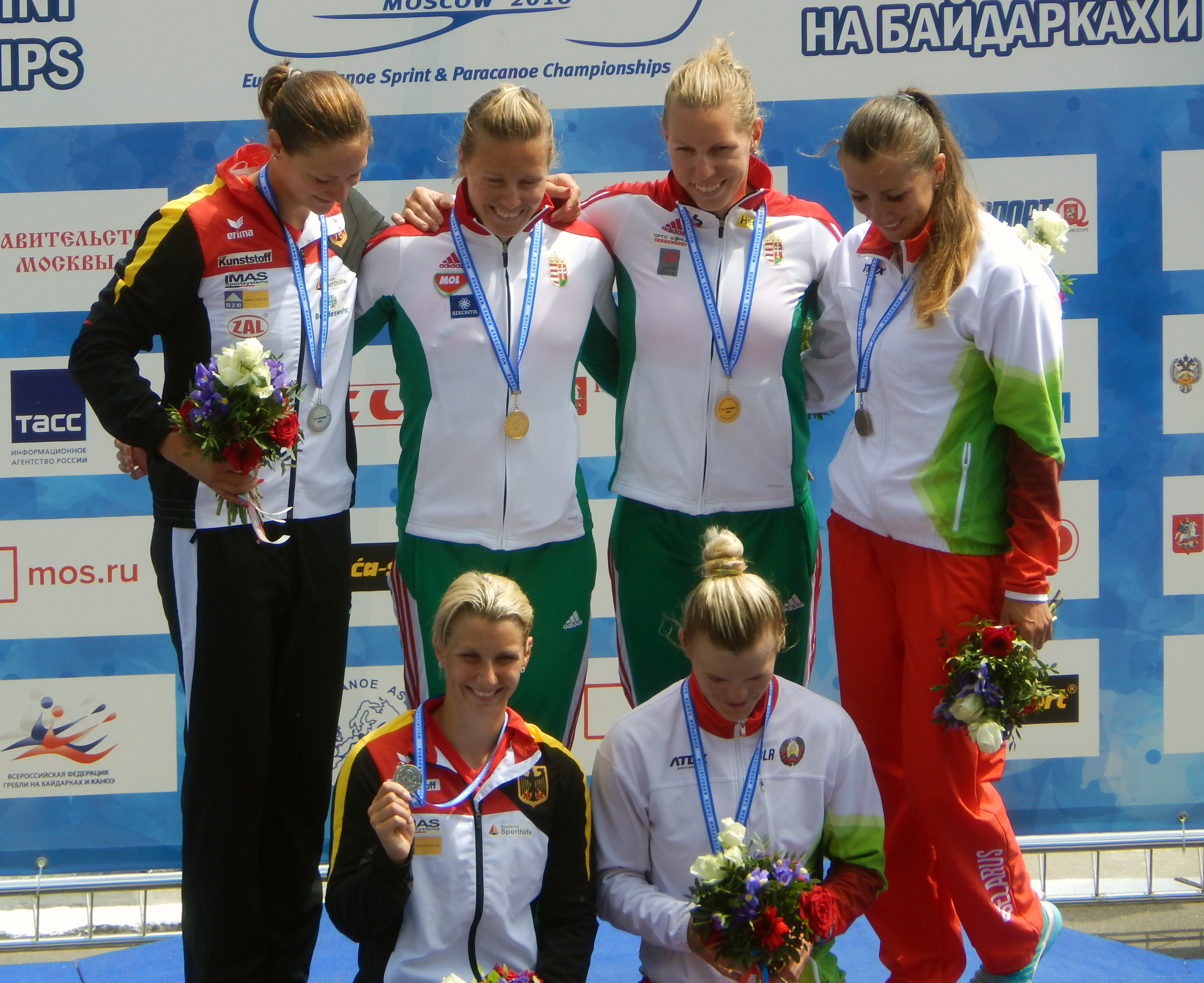

Personal information
- Nationality: German
- Born: 3 November 1992 (age 33) Dresden, Germany
- Height: 1.78 m (5 ft 10 in)
- Weight: 70 kg (154 lb)

Sport
- Sport: Canoe sprint
- Club: Kanu Club Dresden
Medal record
Women's canoe sprint
Representing Germany
Olympic Games
Silver medal – second place	2016 Rio de Janeiro	K-4 500 m
World Championships
Silver medal – second place	2017 Račice	K-4 500 m
Bronze medal – third place	2018 Montemor-o-Velho	K-2 500 m

Steffi Kriegerstein (born 3 November 1992) is a German canoeist. She competed in the women's K-4 500 metres event at the 2016 Summer Olympics where the team won a silver medal.

In 2015 she was world champion in the K2 1000 meters in Milan, and won silver and bronze in the K4 2017 and 2018 World Cup.

She missed the 2020 Summer Olympics because of a COVID-19 infection, and retired in 2022, age 29, due to the effects of Long COVID.
