= Tibor Linka =

Slovak sprint canoer

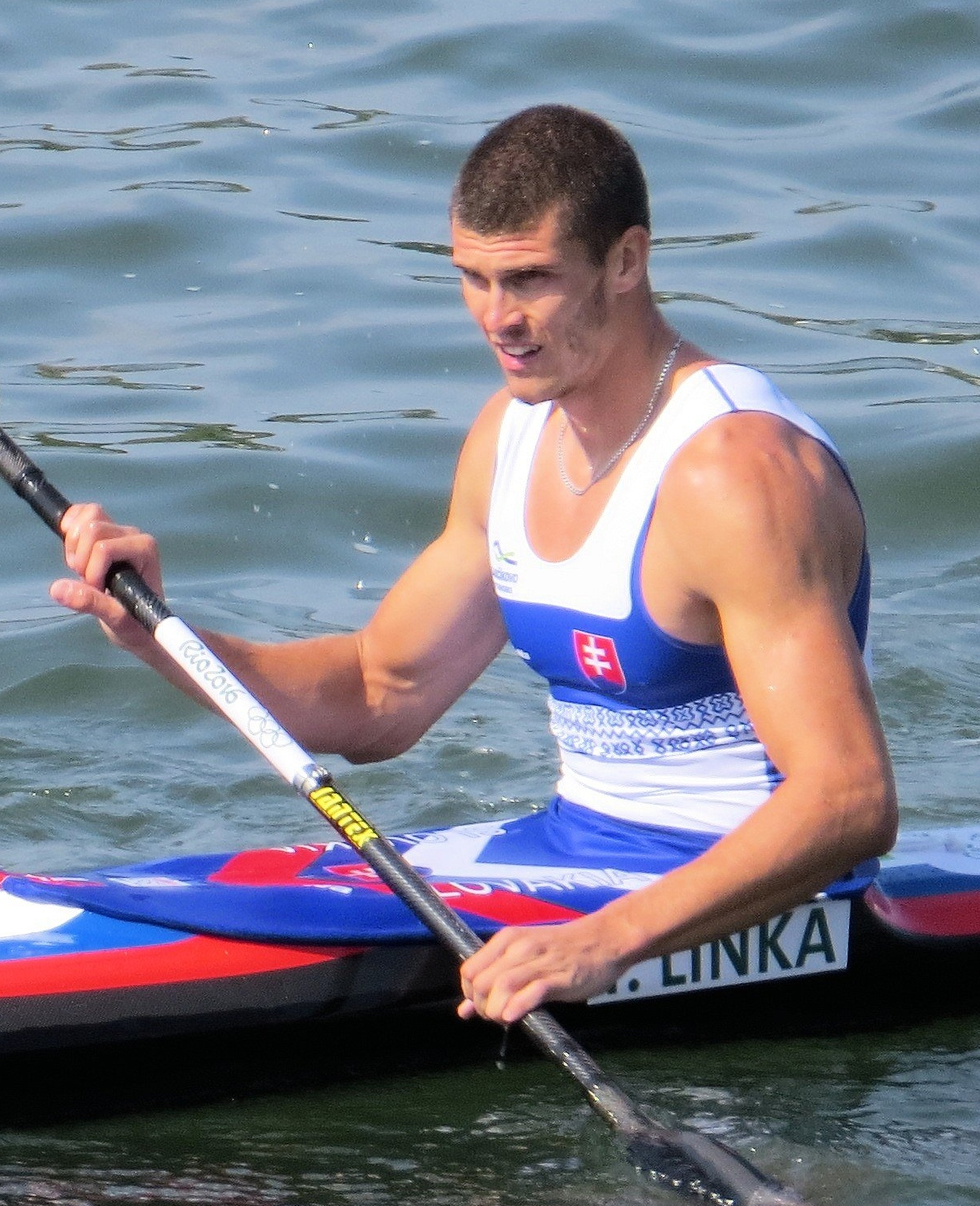
- Linka at the 2016 Summer Olympics

Personal information
- Nationality: Slovak
- Born: 13 February 1995 (age 31) Šamorín, Slovakia
- Height: 199 cm (6 ft 6 in)
- Weight: 105 kg (231 lb)

Sport
- Club: Kajak Canoe Klub Samorin
- Coached by: Marian Tesarik
Medal record
Representing Slovakia
Olympic Games
Silver medal – second place	2016 Rio de Janeiro	K-4 1000 m
World Championships
Gold medal – first place	2015 Milan	K-4 1000 m
European Championships
Gold medal – first place	2016 Moscow	K-4 1000 m
Silver medal – second place	2016 Moscow	K-4 500 m

Tibor Linka (Hungarian: Linka Tibor, born 13 February 1995) is a Slovak sprint canoer who competes in the four-man (K-4) events. He won a gold medal at the 2015 World Championships and a silver medal at the 2016 Olympics. Earlier in 2014 he was named Athlete of the Year in his native town of Šamorín. He is of Hungarian ethnicity.

== Career ==
At the 2013 European Junior and U23 Championships he won a gold medal in K-2 500 metres junior race with Denis Myšák. Next year, again with Myšák, they finished second in the U23 race. In 2015 he became part of Slovak K-4 team, which had won many medals at the Olympic Games, World and European Championships. With Erik Vlček, Juraj Tarr and Denis Myšák, they won K-4 1000 metres race at the 2015 World Championships. In 2016, the same team won one gold and one silver medal at the 2016 European Championships, showing good form before the main objective of the season, the Olympic Games, where they competed in the K-4 1000 m category as the reigning World Champions and managed to win the silver medal.
