= Juraj Tarr =

Slovak flatwater sprint canoeist (born 1979)

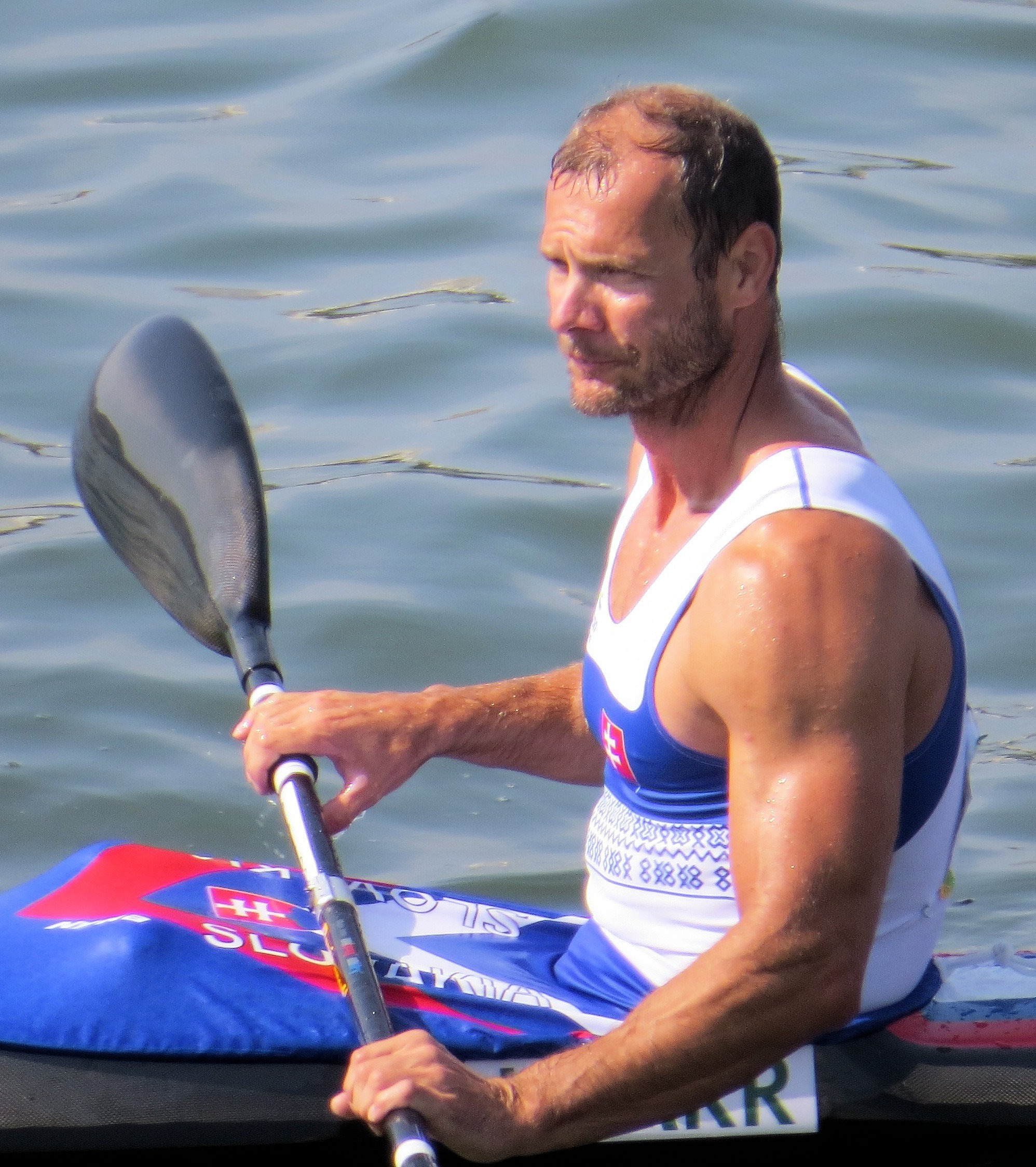
- Tarr at the 2016 Olympics

Personal information
- Nationality: Slovakian
- Born: 18 February 1979 (age 47) Komárno, Slovakia
- Height: 186 cm (6 ft 1 in)
- Weight: 87 kg (192 lb)

Sport
- Country: Slovakia
- Sport: Sprint kayak
- Events: K-2 500 m, K-2 1000 m, K-4 500 m, K-4 1000 m
- Club: SKP Bratislava
- Coached by: Peter Liker
Medal record
Men's canoe sprint
Representing Slovakia
Olympic Games
Silver medal – second place	2008 Beijing	K-4 1000 m
Silver medal – second place	2016 Rio de Janeiro	K-4 1000 m
World Championships
Gold medal – first place	2007 Duisburg	K-4 500 m
Gold medal – first place	2014 Moscow	K-2 500 m
Gold medal – first place	2014 Moscow	K-2 1000 m
Gold medal – first place	2015 Milan	K-4 1000 m
Silver medal – second place	2005 Zagreb	K-4 500 m
Silver medal – second place	2009 Dartmouth	K-4 200 m
Silver medal – second place	2018 Montemor-o-Velho	K-4 1000 m
Bronze medal – third place	2007 Duisburg	K-4 1000 m
Bronze medal – third place	2009 Dartmouth	K-4 1000 m
Bronze medal – third place	2019 Szeged	K-4 1000 m
European Championships
Gold medal – first place	2007 Pontevedra	K-4 500 m
Gold medal – first place	2007 Pontevedra	K-4 1000 m
Gold medal – first place	2008 Milan	K-4 500 m
Gold medal – first place	2008 Milan	K-4 1000 m
Gold medal – first place	2016 Moscow	K-4 1000 m
Silver medal – second place	2000 Poznań	K-4 500 m
Silver medal – second place	2005 Poznań	K-4 500 m
Silver medal – second place	2009 Brandenburg	K-4 1000 m
Silver medal – second place	2015 Račice	K-2 500 m
Silver medal – second place	2016 Moscow	K-4 500 m
Silver medal – second place	2017 Plovdiv	K-4 500 m
Bronze medal – third place	2014 Brandenburg	K-2 1000 m
Bronze medal – third place	2017 Plovdiv	K-4 1000 m

Juraj Tarr (born 18 February 1979) is a Slovak flatwater sprint canoeist who competes in two-man (K-2) and four-man (K-4) events. He participated in four Olympics in the K-4 1000 m event and won silver medals in 2008 and 2016, placing fourth in 2000 and sixth in 2012. He also won eight medals at the ICF Canoe Sprint World Championships in 2005–2015, including four gold medals.

Tarr belongs to the Hungarian minority in Slovakia. He took up canoeing aged eight, following his father Juraj Tarr Sr., who competed internationally for Czechoslovakia. He was named Slovak Kayaker of the Year in 2014 (together with Erik Vlček) and in 2015. Earlier in 1997 he was diagnosed with thyroid cancer and semi-retired from sport for three years to undergo intensive treatment.
