= 2019 ICF Canoe Sprint World Championships – Men's K-1 1000 metres =

Men's K-1 1000 metres at the 2019 ICF Canoe Sprint World Championships
- Venue: Olympic Centre of Szeged
- Location: Szeged, Hungary
- Dates: 22–24 August
- Competitors: 53 from 53 nations
- Winning time: 3:36.07

Medalists
gold medal	Bálint Kopasz	Hungary
silver medal	Josef Dostál	Czech Republic
bronze medal	Fernando Pimenta	Portugal

The men's K-1 1000 metres competition at the 2019 ICF Canoe Sprint World Championships in Szeged took place at the Olympic Centre of Szeged.

== Schedule ==
The schedule was as follows:

Date	Time	Round
Thursday 22 August 2019	09:28	Heats
Friday 23 August 2019	18:07	Semifinals
Saturday 24 August 2019	10:37	Final C
Saturday 24 August 2019	10:44	Final B
Saturday 24 August 2019	12:14	Final A

All times are Central European Summer Time (UTC+2)

== Results ==
=== Heats ===
The four fastest boats in each heat, plus the three fastest fifth-place boats advanced to the semifinals.

==== Heat 1 ====
Rank	Kayaker	Country	Time	Notes
1	Fernando Pimenta	Portugal	3:29.87	QS
2	Lars Magne Ullvang	Norway	3:30.91	QS
3	Jean van der Westhuyzen	Australia	3:31.77	QS
4	Andrea Schera	Italy	3:32.53	QS
5	Louis Hattingh	South Africa	3:35.77	
6	Andri Summermatter	Switzerland	3:35.80	
7	Abdusattor Gafurov	Tajikistan	3:50.20	
–	Jimmy Jonas	Palau	DNS	
–	Edwin Amaya	Colombia	DNS	

==== Heat 2 ====
Rank	Kayaker	Country	Time	Notes
1	Josef Dostál	Czech Republic	3:26.78	QS
2	Jošt Zakrajšek	Slovenia	3:27.58	QS
3	Artuur Peters	Belgium	3:27.84	QS
4	Bojan Zdelar	Serbia	3:28.11	QS
5	Quaid Thompson	New Zealand	3:32.52	qS
6	Vitaliy Tsurkan	Ukraine	3:34.04	
7	Joaquim Manhique	Mozambique	4:10.04	
8	Nicholas Robinson	Trinidad and Tobago	4:15.98	
–	Nikola Maleski	North Macedonia	DNS	

==== Heat 3 ====
Rank	Kayaker	Country	Time	Notes
1	Aleh Yurenia	Belarus	3:28.84	QS
2	René Holten Poulsen	Denmark	3:30.10	QS
3	Joakim Lindberg	Sweden	3:30.45	QS
4	Antun Novaković	Croatia	3:32.05	QS
5	Barry Watkins	Ireland	3:33.16	qS
6	Bram Brandjes	Netherlands	3:37.76	
7	Darko Savić	Bosnia and Herzegovina	3:47.60	
8	Ali Hassan	Egypt	3:59.05	
9	Saphan Swaleh	Pakistan	4:22.53	

==== Heat 4 ====
Rank	Kayaker	Country	Time	Notes
1	Bálint Kopasz	Hungary	3:26.11	QS
2	Miroslav Kirchev	Bulgaria	3:27.44	QS
3	Peter Gelle	Slovakia	3:27.45	QS
4	Tamás Gecső	Germany	3:30.35	QS
5	Wang Chi	China	3:35.59	qS
6	Constantin Mironescu	Romania	3:50.45	
7	Rodion Tuigunov	Kyrgyzstan	3:50.50	
8	Amado Cruz	Belize	3:51.12	
9	Cheung Tsz Chun	Hong Kong	3:52.35	

==== Heat 5 ====
Rank	Kayaker	Country	Time	Notes
1	Étienne Hubert	France	3:29.30	QS
2	Maxim Spesivtsev	Russia	3:30.34	QS
3	Roi Rodríguez	Spain	3:38.53	QS
4	Ilya Podpolnyy	Israel	3:39.66	QS
5	Jesse Lishchuk	United States	3:43.06	
6	Lin Yong-bo	Chinese Taipei	3:43.35	
7	Edvards Ceipe	Latvia	4:03.01	
8	Ayoub Haidra	Algeria	4:03.41	
9	Khairul Naim Zainal	Malaysia	4:04.50	

==== Heat 6 ====
Rank	Kayaker	Country	Time	Notes
1	Agustín Vernice	Argentina	3:30.10	QS
2	Rafał Rosolski	Poland	3:31.42	QS
3	Thomas Lusty	Great Britain	3:31.51	QS
4	Mohamed Mrabet	Tunisia	3:33.76	QS
5	Aleksey Mochalov	Uzbekistan	3:36.55	
6	Vagner Souta	Brazil	3:36.64	
7	Cristian Canache	Venezuela	3:55.53	
–	Eddy Barranco	Puerto Rico	DNS	

=== Semifinals ===
Qualification in each semi was as follows:

The fastest three boats advanced to the A final.
The next three fastest boats advanced to the B final.
The seventh, eighth and ninth-place boats advanced to the C final.

==== Semifinal 1 ====
Rank	Kayaker	Country	Time	Notes
1	Josef Dostál	Czech Republic	3:25.45	QA
2	Peter Gelle	Slovakia	3:25.67	QA
3	Étienne Hubert	France	3:26.61	QA
4	Jean van der Westhuyzen	Australia	3:27.63	QB
5	Thomas Lusty	Great Britain	3:29.78	QB
6	Bojan Zdelar	Serbia	3:31.65	QB
7	Wang Chi	China	3:37.65	QC
8	Ilya Podpolnyy	Israel	3:46.39	QC
9	René Holten Poulsen	Denmark	3:48.16	QC

==== Semifinal 2 ====
Rank	Kayaker	Country	Time	Notes
1	Fernando Pimenta	Portugal	3:25.03	QA
2	Bálint Kopasz	Hungary	3:25.09	QA
3	Maxim Spesivtsev	Russia	3:27.83	QA
4	Rafał Rosolski	Poland	3:28.32	QB
5	Joakim Lindberg	Sweden	3:29.10	QB
6	Jošt Zakrajšek	Slovenia	3:30.29	QB
7	Andrea Schera	Italy	3:30.46	QC
8	Tamás Gecső	Germany	3:31.32	QC
9	Quaid Thompson	New Zealand	3:31.49	QC

==== Semifinal 3 ====
Rank	Kayaker	Country	Time	Notes
1	Aleh Yurenia	Belarus	3:26.50	QA
2	Agustín Vernice	Argentina	3:27.01	QA
3	Roi Rodríguez	Spain	3:27.34	QA
4	Artuur Peters	Belgium	3:27.47	QB
5	Lars Magne Ullvang	Norway	3:28.07	QB
6	Barry Watkins	Ireland	3:30.89	QB
7	Miroslav Kirchev	Bulgaria	3:31.29	QC
8	Antun Novaković	Croatia	3:31.91	QC
9	Mohamed Mrabet	Tunisia	3:33.29	QC

=== Finals ===
==== Final C ====
Competitors in this final raced for positions 19 to 27.

Rank	Kayaker	Country	Time
1	Tamás Gecső	Germany	3:42.36
2	Miroslav Kirchev	Bulgaria	3:42.67
3	Andrea Schera	Italy	3:44.41
4	René Holten Poulsen	Denmark	3:44.88
5	Antun Novaković	Croatia	3:46.40
6	Wang Chi	China	3:46.84
7	Quaid Thompson	New Zealand	3:49.05
8	Mohamed Mrabet	Tunisia	3:50.82
9	Ilya Podpolnyy	Israel	3:50.94

==== Final B ====
Competitors in this final raced for positions 10 to 18.

Rank	Kayaker	Country	Time
1	Jean van der Westhuyzen	Australia	3:40.82
2	Bojan Zdelar	Serbia	3:41.37
3	Rafał Rosolski	Poland	3:42.39
4	Jošt Zakrajšek	Slovenia	3:42.81
5	Thomas Lusty	Great Britain	3:43.16
6	Joakim Lindberg	Sweden	3:43.24
7	Artuur Peters	Belgium	3:46.39
8	Lars Magne Ullvang	Norway	3:46.57
9	Barry Watkins	Ireland	3:47.24

==== Final A ====
Competitors in this final raced for positions 1 to 9, with medals going to the top three.

Rank	Kayaker	Country	Time
1st place, gold medalist(s)	Bálint Kopasz	Hungary	3:36.07
2nd place, silver medalist(s)	Josef Dostál	Czech Republic	3:37.31
3rd place, bronze medalist(s)	Fernando Pimenta	Portugal	3:37.63
4	Peter Gelle	Slovakia	3:39.99
5	Maxim Spesivtsev	Russia	3:40.04
6	Aleh Yurenia	Belarus	3:40.35
7	Étienne Hubert	France	3:40.44
8	Roi Rodríguez	Spain	3:42.22
9	Agustín Vernice	Argentina	3:44.81
