= Canoeing at the 2020 Summer Olympics – Men's K-1 1000 metres =

Olympic canoeing event

Men's K-1 1000 metres at the Games of the XXXII Olympiad
- Canoeing pictogram
- Venue: Sea Forest Waterway
- Dates: 2 August 2021 (heats and quarterfinal); 3 August 2021 (semifinal & final)
- Competitors: 27 from 23 nations
- Winning time: 3:20.643

Medalists
1st place, gold medalist(s)		Bálint Kopasz	Hungary
2nd place, silver medalist(s)		Ádám Varga	Hungary
3rd place, bronze medalist(s)		Fernando Pimenta	Portugal

The men's K-1 1000 metres sprint canoeing event at the 2020 Summer Olympics took place on 2 and 3 August 2021 at the Sea Forest Waterway. At least 15 canoeists from at least 15 nations competed.

== Background ==
This was the 20th appearance of the event, one of four events to have appeared every Summer Games since the introduction of canoeing in 1936.

The reigning World Champion is Bálint Kopasz of Hungary. The reigning Olympic champion is Marcus Walz of Spain, who will not defend his title; he is not among the 6 men's kayakers on Spain's team for 2020.

== Qualification ==
A National Olympic Committee (NOC) could qualify one place in the event, though could enter up to 2 boats if it earned enough quota places through other women's kayak events. A total of 13 qualification places were available, initially allocated as follows:

- 1 place for the host nation, provided it qualified no other men's kayak places
- 5 places awarded through the 2019 ICF Canoe Sprint World Championships
- 6 places awarded through continental tournaments, 1 per continent except 2 places for Europe
- 1 place awarded through the 2021 Canoe Sprint World Cup Stage 2.

Qualifying places were awarded to the NOC, not to the individual canoeist who earned the place. Two additional spots were added: a Tripartite Commission invitation (for Amado Cruz of Belize) and a Refugee Olympic Team invitation for Saeid Fazloula.

The World Championships quota places were allocated as follows:

Rank	Kayaker	Nation	Qualification	Selected competitor
1	Bálint Kopasz	Hungary	6 places from K-4 and K-2	Could enter via K-1 500, K-2, or K-4
2	Josef Dostál	Czech Republic	Earned quota in K-2 1000 m	Could enter via K-1 500, K-2, or K-4
3	Fernando Pimenta	Portugal	Quota #1 in K-1 1000m	
4	Peter Gelle	Slovakia	Quota #2 in K-1 1000m	
5	Maxim Spesivtsev	ROC	Quota #3 in K-1 1000m	
6	Aleh Yurenia	Belarus	Quota #4 in K-1 1000m	
7	Étienne Hubert	France	Earned quota in K-2 1000 m	Could enter via K-1 500, K-2, or K-4
8	Roi Rodríguez	Spain	6 places from K-4 and K-2	Could enter via K-1 500, K-2, or K-4
9	Agustín Vernice	Argentina	Quota #5 in K-1 1000m	
10	Jean van der Westhuyzen	Australia	6 places from K-4 and K-2	Could enter via K-1 500, K-2, or K-4
11	Bojan Zdelar	Serbia	Reallocated host quota in K-1 1000m	

Continental, World Cup, and other places:

Nation	Qualification	Selected competitor
Tunisia	Africa quota in K-1 1000 m	
Brazil	Americas quota in K-1 1000 m	
Iran	Asia quota in K-1 1000 m	Ali Aghamirzaei
Belgium	Europe quota #1 in K-1 1000 m	
Norway	Europe quota #2 in K-1 1000 m	
Cook Islands	Oceania quota in K-1 1000 m	
China	World Cup quota in K-1 1000 m	
Belize	Tripartite Invitation	Amado Cruz
Refugee Olympic Team	Refugee Team Invitation	Saeid Fazloula

Nations with men's kayak quota spots from the K-1 200 metres, K-2 1000 metres, or K-4 500 metres could enter (additional) boats as well.

== Competition format ==
Sprint canoeing uses a four-round format for events with at least 11 boats, with heats, quarterfinals, semifinals, and finals. The specifics of the progression format depend on the number of boats ultimately entered.

The course is a flatwater course 9 metres wide. The name of the event describes the particular format within sprint canoeing. The "K" format means a kayak, with the canoeist sitting, using a double-bladed paddle to paddle, and steering with a foot-operated rudder (as opposed to a canoe, with a kneeling canoeist, single-bladed paddle, and no rudder). The "1" is the number of canoeists in each boat. The "1000 metres" is the distance of each race.

== Schedule ==
The event was held over two consecutive days, with two rounds per day. All sessions started at 9:30 a.m. local time, though there are multiple events with races in each session.

Legend
H	Heats	¼	Quarter-finals	½	Semi-finals	F	Final

Sprint
Event↓/Date →	Mon 2		Tue 3		Wed 4	Thu 5	Fri 6	Sat 7
Men's K-1 1000 m	H	¼	½	F				

== Results ==
=== Heats ===
Progression System: 1st-2nd to SF, rest to QF.

==== Heat 1 ====
Rank	Lane	Canoer	Country	Time	Notes
1	5	Josef Dostál	Czech Republic	3:37.342	SF
2	7	Thomas Green	Australia	3:39.492	SF
3	4	Artuur Peters	Belgium	3:41.967	QF
4	3	Maxim Spesivtsev	ROC	3:42.888	QF
5	6	Simon McTavish	Canada	3:43.512	QF
6	2	Kohl Horton	Cook Islands	4:24.679	QF

==== Heat 2 ====
Rank	Lane	Canoer	Country	Time	Notes
1	5	Bálint Kopasz	Hungary	3:39.084	SF
2	4	Agustín Vernice	Argentina	3:40.430	SF
3	6	Samuele Burgo	Italy	3:43.746	QF
4	3	Étienne Hubert	France	3:45.072	QF
5	2	Ali Aghamirzaei	Iran	3:48.609	QF
6	7	Roman Anoshkin	ROC	3:50.580	QF

==== Heat 3 ====
Rank	Lane	Canoer	Country	Time	Notes
1	5	Fernando Pimenta	Portugal	3:40.323	SF
2	4	Peter Gelle	Slovakia	3:42.131	SF
3	3	Jean van der Westhuyzen	Australia	3:46.186	QF
4	2	Guillaume Burger	France	3:53.241	QF
5	6	Vagner Souta	Brazil	3:57.178	QF

==== Heat 4 ====
Rank	Lane	Canoer	Country	Time	Notes
1	5	Aleh Yurenia	Belarus	3:43.444	SF
2	4	Bojan Zdelar	Serbia	3:45.074	SF
3	3	Lars Magne Ullvang	Norway	3:47.253	QF
4	2	Tuva'a Clifton	Samoa	4:11.029	QF
5	6	Amado Cruz	Belize	4:13.080	QF

==== Heat 5 ====
Rank	Lane	Canoer	Country	Time	Notes
1	4	Jacob Schopf	Germany	3:39.504	SF
2	2	Ádám Varga	Hungary	3:39.650	SF
3	5	Zhang Dong	China	3:40.955	QF
4	3	Saeid Fazloula	Refugee Olympic Team	3:52.631	QF
5	6	Mohamed Mrabet	Tunisia	4:02.148	QF

=== Quarterfinals ===
Progression: 1st-2nd to SF, rest out.

==== Quarterfinal 1 ====
Rank	Lane	Canoer	Country	Time	Notes
1	3	Maxim Spesivtsev	ROC	3:44.136	SF
2	5	Zhang Dong	China	3:44.269	SF
3	2	Vagner Souta	Brazil	3:52.402	
4	6	Ali Aghamirzaei	Iran	3:52.834	
5	4	Tuva'a Clifton	Samoa	4:21.301	
6	7	Kohl Horton	Cook Islands	4:39.138	

==== Quarterfinal 2 ====
Rank	Lane	Canoer	Country	Time	Notes
1	4	Artuur Peters	Belgium	3:45.712	SF
2	5	Samuele Burgo	Italy	3:45.993	SF
3	2	Roman Anoshkin	ROC	3:46.576	
4	6	Simon McTavish	Canada	3:52.467	
5	3	Guillaume Burger	France	3:52.817	
6	7	Amado Cruz	Belize	4:15.262	

==== Quarterfinal 3 ====
Rank	Lane	Canoer	Country	Time	Notes
1	4	Jean van der Westhuyzen	Australia	3:46.104	SF
2	5	Étienne Hubert	France	3:46.274	SF
3	3	Lars Magne Ullvang	Norway	3:49.830	
4	2	Saeid Fazloula	Refugee Olympic Team	3:52.614	
5	6	Mohamed Mrabet	Tunisia	3:56.325	

=== Semifinals ===
Progression System: 1st-4th to Final A, rest to Final B.

==== Semifinal 1 ====
Rank	Lane	Canoer	Country	Time	Notes
1	5	Bálint Kopasz	Hungary	3:24.558	OB, FA
2	4	Josef Dostál	Czech Republic	3:25.387	FA
3	3	Jacob Schopf	Germany	3:25.586	FA
4	1	Zhang Dong	China	3:26.246	FA
5	7	Artuur Peters	Belgium	3:26.773	FB
6	8	Étienne Hubert	France	3:27.319	FB
7	2	Peter Gelle	Slovakia	3:28.255	FB
8	6	Bojan Zdelar	Serbia	3:29.525	FB

==== Semifinal 2 ====
Rank	Lane	Canoer	Country	Time	Notes
1	5	Fernando Pimenta	Portugal	3:22.942	FA, OB
2	2	Ádám Varga	Hungary	3:23.634	FA
3	3	Thomas Green	Australia	3:24.612	FA
4	6	Agustín Vernice	Argentina	3:24.734	FA
5	8	Samuele Burgo	Italy	3:25.673	FB
6	4	Aleh Yurenia	Belarus	3:27.323	FB
7	7	Maxim Spesivtsev	ROC	3:27.372	FB
8	1	Jean van der Westhuyzen	Australia	3:28.287	FB

=== Finals ===
==== Final A ====
Rank	Lane	Canoer	Country	Time	Notes
1st place, gold medalist(s)	5	Bálint Kopasz	Hungary	3:20.643	OB
2nd place, silver medalist(s)	6	Ádám Varga	Hungary	3:22.431	
3rd place, bronze medalist(s)	4	Fernando Pimenta	Portugal	3:22.478	
4	7	Jacob Schopf	Germany	3:22.554	
5	3	Josef Dostál	Czech Republic	3:26.610	
6	1	Zhang Dong	China	3:28.103	
7	2	Thomas Green	Australia	3:28.360	
8	8	Agustín Vernice	Argentina	3:28.503	

==== Final B ====
Rank	Lane	Canoer	Country	Time	Notes
9	4	Samuele Burgo	Italy	3:26.169	
10	5	Artuur Peters	Belgium	3:26.781	
11	8	Jean van der Westhuyzen	Australia	3:26.955	
12	6	Aleh Yurenia	Belarus	3:27.190	
13	2	Maxim Spesivtsev	ROC	3:27.909	
14	7	Peter Gelle	Slovakia	3:28.240	
15	3	Étienne Hubert	France	3:31.553	
16	1	Bojan Zdelar	Serbia	3:31.689	
