= 2017 ICF Canoe Sprint World Championships – Men's K-1 500 metres =

Men's K-1 500 metres at the 2017 ICF Canoe Sprint World Championships
- Venue: Sportcentrum Račice
- Location: Račice, Czech Republic
- Dates: 25–27 August
- Competitors: 33 from 33 nations
- Winning time: 1:36.520

Medalists
gold medal	Josef Dostál	Czech Republic
silver medal	René Holten Poulsen	Denmark
bronze medal	Oleh Kukharyk	Ukraine

The men's K-1 500 metres competition at the 2017 ICF Canoe Sprint World Championships in Račice took place at the Sportcentrum Račice.

== Schedule ==
The schedule was as follows:

Date	Time	Round
Friday 25 August 2017	11:26	Heats
Friday 25 August 2017	16:42	Semifinals
Sunday 27 August 2017	09:49	Final B
Sunday 27 August 2017	11:27	Final A

All times are Central European Summer Time (UTC+2)

== Results ==
=== Heats ===
The six fastest boats in each heat, plus the three fastest remaining boats advanced to the semifinals.

==== Heat 1 ====
Rank	Kayaker	Country	Time	Notes
1	René Holten Poulsen	Denmark	1:36.967	QS
2	Josef Dostál	Czech Republic	1:37.151	QS
3	Oleh Kukharyk	Ukraine	1:38.301	QS
4	Dzmitry Natynchyk	Belarus	1:38.701	QS
5	Peter Gelle	Slovakia	1:39.334	QS
6	Aurélien Le Gall	France	1:40.251	QS
7	Marton Apor Urban	United States	1:51.767	
8	Ahmed Sameer Jumaah	Iraq	1:52.767	
9	Abdelmajid Jabbour	Morocco	2:04.684	

==== Heat 2 ====
Rank	Kayaker	Country	Time	Notes
1	Bálint Kopasz	Hungary	1:39.024	QS
2	Marcus Gross	Germany	1:39.691	QS
3	Antun Novaković	Croatia	1:40.063	QS
4	Sergii Tokarnytskyi	Kazakhstan	1:40.724	QS
5	Jarett Kenke	Canada	1:42.008	QS
6	Thomas Lusty	Great Britain	1:43.213	QS
7	Andri Summermatter	Switzerland	1:44.069	qS
8	Mohamed Mrabet	Tunisia	1:45.308	qS
9	He Long	China	1:49.758	

==== Heat 3 ====
Rank	Kayaker	Country	Time	Notes
1	Roman Anoshkin	Russia	1:40.337	QS
2	Mirnazim Javadov	Azerbaijan	1:41.165	QS
3	Miroslav Kirchev	Bulgaria	1:42.237	QS
4	Martin Nathell	Sweden	1:42.670	QS
5	Billy Bain	Australia	1:43.509	QS
6	Joona Mäntynen	Finland	1:44.165	QS
7	Tarmo Tootsi	Estonia	1:44.737	qS
8	Muhammad Syaheenul Aiman	Singapore	1:49.170	

==== Heat 4 ====
Rank	Kayaker	Country	Time	Notes
1	Lars Magne Ullvang	Norway	1:41.362	QS
2	Roi Rodriguez	Spain	1:42.273	QS
3	Vagner Souta	Brazil	1:43.757	QS
4	Yusuke Miyata	Japan	1:44.207	QS
5	Stuart Bristow	South Africa	1:45.601	QS
6	Patryk Switalski	Poland	1:45.657	QS
7	Juan Pablo Lopez	Puerto Rico	1:49.979	

=== Semifinals ===
Qualification in each semi was as follows:

The fastest three boats advanced to the A final.
The next three fastest boats advanced to the B final.

==== Semifinal 1 ====
Rank	Kayaker	Country	Time	Notes
1	René Holten Poulsen	Denmark	1:39.519	QA
2	Peter Gelle	Slovakia	1:40.153	QA
3	Marcus Gross	Germany	1:40.175	QA
4	Billy Bain	Australia	1:41.058	QB
5	Thomas Lusty	Great Britain	1:41.392	QB
6	Vagner Souta	Brazil	1:42.825	QB
7	Andri Summermatter	Switzerland	1:43.808	
8	Yusuke Miyata	Japan	1:43.919	
9	Mirnazim Javadov	Azerbaijan	1:43.947	

==== Semifinal 2 ====
Rank	Kayaker	Country	Time	Notes
1	Oleh Kukharyk	Ukraine	1:37.184	QA
2	Roi Rodriguez	Spain	1:37.801	QA
3	Dzmitry Natynchyk	Belarus	1:37.856	QA
4	Bálint Kopasz	Hungary	1:38.123	QB
5	Jarett Kenke	Canada	1:40.545	QB
6	Martin Nathell	Sweden	1:42.234	QB
7	Tarmo Tootsi	Estonia	1:42.501	
8	Miroslav Kirchev	Bulgaria	1:47.251	
9	Patryk Switalski	Poland	1:48.884	

==== Semifinal 3 ====
Rank	Kayaker	Country	Time	Notes
1	Josef Dostál	Czech Republic	1:39.374	QA
2	Roman Anoshkin	Russia	1:40.118	QA
3	Antun Novaković	Croatia	1:40.685	QA
4	Lars Magne Ullvang	Norway	1:40.929	QB
5	Sergii Tokarnytskyi	Kazakhstan	1:41.063	QB
6	Aurélien Le Gall	France	1:44.129	QB
7	Joona Mäntynen	Finland	1:44.741	
8	Stuart Bristow	South Africa	1:46.152	
9	Mohamed Mrabet	Tunisia	1:46.402	

=== Finals ===
==== Final B ====
Competitors in this final raced for positions 10 to 18.

Rank	Kayaker	Country	Time
1	Bálint Kopasz	Hungary	1:38.335
2	Lars Magne Ullvang	Norway	1:39.785
3	Thomas Lusty	Great Britain	1:41.030
4	Billy Bain	Australia	1:41.058
5	Aurélien Le Gall	France	1:41.463
6	Jarett Kenke	Canada	1:41.647
7	Martin Nathell	Sweden	1:42.235
8	Vagner Souta	Brazil	1:43.780
9	Sergii Tokarnytskyi	Kazakhstan	1:48.669

==== Final A ====
Competitors in this final raced for positions 1 to 9, with medals going to the top three.

Rank	Kayaker	Country	Time
1st place, gold medalist(s)	Josef Dostál	Czech Republic	1:36.520
2nd place, silver medalist(s)	René Holten Poulsen	Denmark	1:38.267
3rd place, bronze medalist(s)	Oleh Kukharyk	Ukraine	1:38.483
4	Roi Rodriguez	Spain	1:38.515
5	Dzmitry Natynchyk	Belarus	1:38.562
6	Roman Anoshkin	Russia	1:38.752
7	Marcus Gross	Germany	1:39.962
8	Peter Gelle	Slovakia	1:40.125
9	Antun Novaković	Croatia	1:41.025
