= 2018 ICF Canoe Sprint World Championships – Men's K-1 500 metres =

Men's K-1 500 metres at the 2018 ICF Canoe Sprint World Championships
- Venue: Centro de Alto Rendimento de Montemor-o-Velho
- Location: Montemor-o-Velho, Portugal
- Dates: 23–24 August
- Competitors: 31 from 31 nations
- Winning time: 1:37.905

Medalists
gold medal	Josef Dostál	Czech Republic
silver medal	Tom Liebscher	Germany
bronze medal	Bence Nádas	Hungary

The men's K-1 500 metres competition at the 2018 ICF Canoe Sprint World Championships in Montemor-o-Velho took place at the Centro de Alto Rendimento de Montemor-o-Velho.

== Schedule ==
The schedule was as follows:

Date	Time	Round
Thursday 23 August 2018	10:59	Heats
Friday 24 August 2018	11:02	Semifinals
Friday 24 August 2018	16:39	Final A
Friday 24 August 2018	17:05	Final B

All times are Western European Summer Time (UTC+1)

== Results ==
=== Heats ===
The six fastest boats in each heat, plus the three fastest remaining boats advanced to the semifinals.

==== Heat 1 ====
Rank	Kayaker	Country	Time	Notes
1	Josef Dostál	Czech Republic	1:38.238	QS
2	Bence Nádas	Hungary	1:38.603	QS
3	Artuur Peters	Belgium	1:41.523	QS
4	Bojan Zdelar	Serbia	1:42.578	QS
5	Joona Mäntynen	Finland	1:43.053	QS
6	Bram Brandjes	Netherlands	1:43.103	QS
7	Mathew Bowley	Great Britain	1:44.078	qS
8	Roberts Altmanis	Latvia	1:46.958	qS

==== Heat 2 ====
Rank	Kayaker	Country	Time	Notes
1	Oleh Kukharyk	Ukraine	1:40.034	QS
2	Thomas Green	Australia	1:40.204	QS
3	Antun Novaković	Croatia	1:43.234	QS
4	Ilya Podpolnyy	Israel	1:46.119	QS
5	Tom Brennan	Ireland	1:52.540	QS
6	Joaquim Manhique	Mozambique	1:57.045	QS
7	Ossama Bousserra	Morocco	2:01.080	
8	Vladimir Veljanoski	Macedonia	2:02.600	

==== Heat 3 ====
Rank	Kayaker	Country	Time	Notes
1	Tom Liebscher	Germany	1:39.554	QS
2	João Ribeiro	Portugal	1:40.109	QS
3	Étienne Hubert	France	1:40.149	QS
4	Chrisjan Coetzee	South Africa	1:42.210	QS
5	Enrique Adán	Spain	1:44.105	QS
6	Sebastián Delgado	Uruguay	1:45.085	QS
7	Karim Abdelsamie	Egypt	1:45.385	qS

==== Heat 4 ====
Rank	Kayaker	Country	Time	Notes
1	Mirnazim Javadov	Azerbaijan	1:42.922	QS
2	Roman Anoshkin	Russia	1:42.972	QS
3	Miroslav Kirchev	Bulgaria	1:44.117	QS
4	Mikita Borykau	Belarus	1:45.072	QS
5	Giulio Dressino	Italy	1:45.133	QS
6	Henrik Strand	Sweden	1:46.758	QS
7	Stanton Collins	United States	1:47.623	
8	Juan Calderon	Colombia	1:50.848	

=== Semifinals ===
Qualification in each semi was as follows:

The fastest three boats advanced to the A final.
The next three fastest boats advanced to the B final.

==== Semifinal 1 ====
Rank	Kayaker	Country	Time	Notes
1	Bence Nádas	Hungary	1:40.981	QA
2	Oleh Kukharyk	Ukraine	1:41.146	QA
3	Étienne Hubert	France	1:41.391	QA
4	Chrisjan Coetzee	South Africa	1:42.741	QB
5	Mirnazim Javadov	Azerbaijan	1:43.106	QB
6	Bram Brandjes	Netherlands	1:44.392	QB
7	Mathew Bowley	Great Britain	1:45.382	
8	Giulio Dressino	Italy	1:45.902	
9	Joaquim Manhique	Mozambique	1:58.847	

==== Semifinal 2 ====
Rank	Kayaker	Country	Time	Notes
1	Mikita Borykau	Belarus	1:39.736	QA
2	Roman Anoshkin	Russia	1:40.106	QA
3	Tom Liebscher	Germany	1:40.236	QA
4	Artuur Peters	Belgium	1:40.306	QB
5	Antun Novaković	Croatia	1:42.186	QB
6	Ilya Podpolnyy	Israel	1:42.741	QB
7	Joona Mäntynen	Finland	1:43.091	
8	Sebastián Delgado	Uruguay	1:44.396	
9	Karim Abdelsamie	Egypt	1:46.896	

==== Semifinal 3 ====
Rank	Kayaker	Country	Time	Notes
1	Josef Dostál	Czech Republic	1:40.853	QA
2	João Ribeiro	Portugal	1:40.873	QA
3	Thomas Green	Australia	1:40.968	QA
4	Enrique Adán	Spain	1:44.713	QB
5	Miroslav Kirchev	Bulgaria	1:45.313	QB
6	Tom Brennan	Ireland	1:45.708	QB
7	Bojan Zdelar	Serbia	1:46.658	
8	Henrik Strand	Sweden	1:49.478	
9	Roberts Altmanis	Latvia	1:51.063	

=== Finals ===
==== Final B ====
Competitors in this final raced for positions 10 to 18.

Rank	Kayaker	Country	Time
1	Artuur Peters	Belgium	1:40.796
2	Chrisjan Coetzee	South Africa	1:40.996
3	Antun Novaković	Croatia	1:42.183
4	Enrique Adán	Spain	1:43.583
5	Ilya Podpolnyy	Israel	1:43.606
6	Bram Brandjes	Netherlands	1:44.436
7	Mirnazim Javadov	Azerbaijan	1:44.930
8	Tom Brennan	Ireland	1:46.537
9	Miroslav Kirchev	Bulgaria	1:51.190

==== Final A ====
Competitors in this final raced for positions 1 to 9, with medals going to the top three.

Rank	Kayaker	Country	Time
1st place, gold medalist(s)	Josef Dostál	Czech Republic	1:37.905
2nd place, silver medalist(s)	Tom Liebscher	Germany	1:38.912
3rd place, bronze medalist(s)	Bence Nádas	Hungary	1:39.516
4	João Ribeiro	Portugal	1:39.739
5	Oleh Kukharyk	Ukraine	1:40.659
6	Roman Anoshkin	Russia	1:41.306
7	Étienne Hubert	France	1:41.592
8	Thomas Green	Australia	1:42.116
9	Mikita Borykau	Belarus	1:44.376
