= 2026 ICF Canoe Sprint World Championships – Men's K-1 500 metres =

Men's K-1 500 metres at the 2026 ICF Canoe Sprint World Championships
- Venue: Lake Malta
- Location: Poznań, Poland
- Dates: 26–30 August
- Competitors: 48 from 48 nations
- Winning time: 1:37.66

Medalists
gold medal	Thomas Green	Australia
silver medal	Adam Varga	Hungary
bronze medal	Alex Borucki	Poland

The men's K-1 500 metres competition at the 2026 ICF Canoe Sprint World Championships in Poznań took place at Lake Malta.

== Schedule ==
The schedule is as follows:

Date	Time	Round
Thursday 27 August 2026		Heats
Saturday 29 August 2026		Semifinals
Sunday 30 August 2026		Final B
Sunday 30 August 2026		Final A

== Record ==
The best performance previously in this discipline was:

World Best	1:35.04	Tom Liebscher-Lucz (GER)	(Hungary) Szeged

== Results ==
=== Heats ===
The result of the round of six heats was as follows:

Qualification rule: First four in each heat (SF) plus three best by time (qBT) to semi finals; remainder eliminated.

Heat 1

Rank	Lane	Name(s)	Nation	Time	Gap	Notes
1	5	Josef Dostal	Czech Republic	1:46.59		SF
2	4	Uladzislau Kravets	Neutral Athletes A	1:47.17	0.58	SF
3	6	Oleh Kukharyk	Ukraine	1:47.36	0.77	SF
4	3	Chenhao Li	China	1:52.11	5.52	SF
5	7	Hugo Lagerstam	Sweden	1:52.27	5.68	
6	1	Sulaiman Ahmed Saeed Al-Samarraie	Iraq	1:56.02	9.43	
7	2	Ther Tristan Loo	Singapore	1:57.79	11.20	
8	8	Bu Tunur Saud	Saudi Arabia	2:10.63	24.04	

Heat 2

Rank	Lane	Name(s)	Nation	Time	Gap	Notes
1	5	Thomas Green	Australia	1:47.66		SF
2	4	Guillaume Keller	France	1:49.14	1.48	SF
3	6	Eetu Kolehmainen	Finland	1:52.09	4.43	SF
4	7	Mohamed Ismail	Egypt	1:53.40	5.74	SF
5	8	Lev Lunin	Moldova	1:53.91	6.25	
6	2	Slehddine Maknine	Tunisia	1:58.76	11.10	
7	1	Mehdi Berkani	Algeria	1:58.92	11.26	
8	3	Fernandes Ngunza	Angola	2:10.24	22.58	

Heat 3

Rank	Lane	Name(s)	Nation	Time	Gap	Notes
1	4	Alex Borucki	Poland	1:45.99		SF
2	5	Andrea Domenico Di Liberto	Italy	1:48.69	2.70	SF
3	6	Viktor Gavrilenko	Neutral Athletes B	1:49.59	3.60	SF
4	7	Laurent Lavigne	Canada	1:50.12	4.13	SF
5	1	Dmitriy Kholmogorov	Kazakhstan	1:51.93	5.94	qBT
6	3	Milan Dekker	Netherlands	1:56.16	10.17	
7	8	Dairon Ardila	Colombia	1:59.44	13.45	
-	2	Subhi Subhi	Indonesia	DNS		

Heat 4

Rank	Lane	Name(s)	Nation	Time	Gap	Notes
1	4	Timon Maurer	Austria	1:46.84		SF
2	5	Alex Graneri	Spain	1:46.85	0.01	SF
3	6	Luca Lauper	Switzerland	1:47.23	0.39	SF
4	3	Sebastian Alveal	Chile	1:48.08	1.24	SF
5	7	Danylo Michuda	Latvia	1:48.19	1.35	qBT
6	2	Daniel Ledesma Alarcon	Mexico	1:51.52	4.68	
7	8	Kron Balidemaj	Kosovo	2:12.00	25.16	
8	1	Petar Jocovic	Montenegro	2:25.07	38.23	

Heat 5

Rank	Lane	Name(s)	Nation	Time	Gap	Notes
1	5	Thorbjorn Rask	Denmark	1:47.00		SF
2	4	Branko Lagundzic	Serbia	1:48.90	1.90	SF
3	6	Shakhriyor Makhkamov	Uzbekistan	1:49.57	2.57	SF
4	3	Martin Gorriti Monterroso	Uruguay	1:51.78	4.78	SF
5	8	Agustin Sanchez	Argentina	1:51.99	4.99	
6	2	Cole Jones	United States	1:52.22	5.22	
7	7	Varinder Singh	India	2:00.18	13.18	
8	1	Diogo Araujo	Cape Verde	2:02.71	15.71	

Heat 6

Rank	Lane	Name(s)	Nation	Time	Gap	Notes
1	5	Adam Varga	Hungary	1:45.33		SF
2	4	Tom Liebscher-Lucz	Germany	1:47.11	1.78	SF
3	6	Denis Mysak	Slovakia	1:47.96	2.63	SF
4	7	Rahmi Kaan Karahan	Turkey	1:48.76	3.43	SF
5	3	Taishi Tanada	Japan	1:49.99	4.66	qBT
6	2	Preslav Simeonov	Bulgaria	1:51.60	6.27	
7	8	Daniel Sirotin	Cyprus	1:54.55	9.22	
8	1	Fred Kahu	Estonia	1:56.28	10.95	

=== Semi finals ===
The result of the semi finals were as follows:

Qualification rule: First three in each semifinal to A final; next three in each semifinal to B final; remainder to C final.

Semi final 1

Rank	Lane	Name(s)	Nation	Time	Gap	Notes
1	5	Thomas Green	Australia	1:37.19		FA
2	4	Thorbjorn Rask	Denmark	1:37.66	0.47	FA
3	7	Luca Lauper	Switzerland	1:38.31	1.12	FA
4	3	Oleh Kukharyk	Ukraine	1:38.79	1.60	FB
5	6	Andrea Domenico Di Liberto	Italy	1:39.31	2.12	FB
6	2	Denis Mysak	Slovakia	1:39.99	2.80	FB
7	1	Dmitriy Kholmogorov	Kazakhstan	1:42.06	4.87	FC
8	9	Martin Gorriti Monterroso	Uruguay	1:42.45	5.26	FC
9	8	Mohamad Ismail	Egypt	1:45.73	8.54	FC

Semi final 2

Rank	Lane	Name(s)	Nation	Time	Gap	Notes
1	4	Timon Maurer	Austria	1:37.89		FA
2	5	Josef Dostal	Czech Republic	1:38.20	0.31	FA
3	7	Tom Liebscher-Lucz	Germany	1:38.35	0.46	FA
4	3	Branko Lagundzic	Serbia	1:38.68	0.79	FB
5	2	Viktor Gavrilenko	Neutral Athletes A	1:38.89	1.00	FB
6	6	Guillaume Keller	France	1:39.88	1.99	FB
7	8	Chenhao Li	China	1:40.00	2.11	FC
8	9	Sebastian Alveal	Chile	1:40.26	2.37	FC
9	1	Danylo Michuda	Latvia	1:42.47	4.58	FC

Semi final 3

Rank	Lane	Name(s)	Nation	Time	Gap	Notes
1	6	Adam Varga	Hungary	1:37.43		FA
2	5	Alex Borucki	Poland	1:37.93	0.50	FA
3	4	Uladzislau Kravets	Neutral Athletes B	1:38.55	1.12	FA
4	3	Alex Graneri	Spain	1:38.85	1.42	FB
5	2	Shakhriyor Makhkamov	Uzbekistan	1:40.80	3.37	FB
6	9	Rahmi Kaan Karahan	Turkey	1:41.01	3.58	FB
7	1	Taishi Tanada	Japan	1:42.25	4.82	FC
8	8	Laurent Lavigne	Canada	1:42.25	4.82	FC
9	7	Eetu Kolehmainen	Finland	1:47.45	10.02	FC

=== Finals ===
The result of the final races were follows:

C Final

Rank	Lane	Name(s)	Nation	Time	Gap	Notes
1	7	Sebastian Alveal	Chile	1:42.77		
2	6	Taishi Tanada	Japan	1:42.99	0.22	
3	4	Chenhao Li	China	1:43.11	0.34	
4	2	Laurent Lavigne	Canada	1:43.71	0.94	
5	1	Danylo Michuda	Latvia	1:44.22	1.45	
6	9	Eetu Kolehmainen	Finland	1:44.36	1.59	
7	3	Martin Gorriti Monterroso	Uruguay	1:44.84	2.07	
8	5	Dmitriy Kholmogorov	Kazakhstan	1:46.27	3.50	
9	8	Mohamed Ismail	Egypt	1:47.63	4.86	

B Final

Rank	Lane	Name(s)	Nation	Time	Gap	Notes
1	4	Alex Graneri	Spain	1:40.65		
2	7	Andrea Domenico Di Liberto	Italy	1:41.08	0.43	
3	6	Branko Lagundzic	Serbia	1:41.39	0.74	
4	3	Viktor Gavrilenko	Neutral Athletes A	1:42.15	1.50	
5	8	Shakhriyor Makhkamov	Uzbekistan	1:42.36	1.71	
6	1	Guillaume Keller	France	1:42.38	1.73	
7	9	Rahmi Kaan Karahan	Turkey	1:42.57	1.92	
8	2	Denis Mysak	Slovakia	1:43.78	3.13	
9	5	Oleh Kukharyk	Ukraine	1:47.85	7.20	

A Final

Rank	Lane	Name(s)	Nation	Time	Gap	Notes
1st place, gold medalist(s)	5	Thomas Green	Australia	1:37.66		
2nd place, silver medalist(s)	6	Adam Varga	Hungary	1:38.07	0.41	
3rd place, bronze medalist(s)	2	Alex Borucki	Poland	1:38.95	1.29	
4	7	Josef Dostal	Czech Republic	1:39.41	1.75	
5	9	Uladzislau Kravets	Neutral Athletes B	1:40.01	2.35	
6	3	Thorbjorn Rask	Denmark	1:40.11	2.45	
7	1	Tom Liebscher-Lucz	Germany	1:40.33	2.67	
8	8	Luca Lauper	Switzerland	1:41.51	3.85	
9	4	Timon Maurer	Austria	1:41.95	4.29	
