= Canoe sprint at the 2019 European Games – Men's K-2 1000 metres =

Men's K-2 1000 metres at the 2019 European Games
- Venue: Zaslavl Regatta Course
- Date: 25–26 June
- Competitors: 32 from 16 nations
- Winning time: 3:18.175

Medalists
| gold medal | Max Hoff; Jacob Schopf | Germany |
| silver medal | Oleh Kukharyk; Oleksandr Syromiatnykov | Ukraine |
| bronze medal | Roman Anoshkin; Vladislav Litovka | Russia |

The men's K-2 1000 metres canoe sprint competition at the 2019 European Games in Minsk took place between 25 and 26 June at the Zaslavl Regatta Course.

== Schedule ==
The schedule was as follows:

| Date | Time | Round |
|---|---|---|
| Tuesday 25 June 2019 | 10:03 | Heats |
| Tuesday 25 June 2019 | 16:30 | Semifinal |
| Wednesday 26 June 2019 | 11:15 | Final |

All times are Further-eastern European Time (UTC+3)

== Results ==
=== Heats ===
The fastest three boats in each heat advanced directly to the final. The next four fastest boats in each heat, plus the fastest remaining boat advanced to the semifinal.

==== Heat 1 ====
| Rank | Kayakers | Country | Time | Notes |
|---|---|---|---|---|
| 1 | Peter Gelle; Adam Botek | Slovakia | 3:08.032 | QF |
| 2 | Samuele Burgo; Luca Beccaro | Italy | 3:09.070 | QF |
| 3 | Vitaliy Bialko; Raman Piatrushenka | Belarus | 3:10.280 | QF |
| 4 | Jon Amund Vold; Eivind Vold | Norway | 3:11.120 | QS |
| 5 | Zoltán Kammerer; Péter Gál | Hungary | 3:11.382 | QS |
| 6 | Martin Brzeziński; Bartosz Stabno | Poland | 3:13.872 | QS |
| 7 | Martin Nathell; Albert Petersson | Sweden | 3:14.897 | QS |
| 8 | Stefan Vekić; Milenko Zorić | Serbia | 3:17.727 | qS |
| 9 | Panagiotis Antoniou; Kostas Efthimiadis | Greece | 3:30.192 | |

==== Heat 2 ====
| Rank | Kayakers | Country | Time | Notes |
|---|---|---|---|---|
| 1 | Max Hoff; Jacob Schopf | Germany | 3:07.591 | QF |
| 2 | Francisco Cubelos; Iñigo Peña | Spain | 3:08.093 | QF |
| 3 | Vladislav Litovka; Roman Anoshkin | Russia | 3:08.251 | QF |
| 4 | Oleksandr Syromiatnykov; Oleh Kukharyk | Ukraine | 3:10.923 | QS |
| 5 | Ričardas Nekriošius; Andrejus Olijnikas | Lithuania | 3:16.998 | QS |
| 6 | Cyrille Carré; Étienne Hubert | France | 3:17.598 | QS |
| 7 | René Holten Poulsen; Nils Boe | Denmark | 3:22.551 | QS |

=== Semifinal ===
The fastest three boats advanced to the final.

| Rank | Kayakers | Country | Time | Notes |
|---|---|---|---|---|
| 1 | Oleksandr Syromiatnykov; Oleh Kukharyk | Ukraine | 3:12.910 | QF |
| 2 | Cyrille Carré; Étienne Hubert | France | 3:13.015 | QF |
| 3 | Ričardas Nekriošius; Andrejus Olijnikas | Lithuania | 3:13.427 | QF |
| 4 | Jon Amund Vold; Eivind Vold | Norway | 3:13.735 | |
| 5 | Zoltán Kammerer; Péter Gál | Hungary | 3:15.442 | |
| 6 | Martin Brzeziński; Bartosz Stabno | Poland | 3:15.682 | |
| 7 | René Holten Poulsen; Nils Boe | Denmark | 3:15.772 | |
| 8 | Stefan Vekić; Milenko Zorić | Serbia | 3:16.017 | |
| 9 | Martin Nathell; Albert Petersson | Sweden | 3:16.965 | |

=== Final ===
Competitors in this final raced for positions 1 to 9, with medals going to the top three.

| Rank | Kayakers | Country | Time |
|---|---|---|---|
| 1st place, gold medalist(s) | Max Hoff; Jacob Schopf | Germany | 3:18.175 |
| 2nd place, silver medalist(s) | Oleksandr Syromiatnykov; Oleh Kukharyk | Ukraine | 3:18.865 |
| 3rd place, bronze medalist(s) | Vladislav Litovka; Roman Anoshkin | Russia | 3:19.023 |
| 4 | Ričardas Nekriošius; Andrejus Olijnikas | Lithuania | 3:19.045 |
| 5 | Peter Gelle; Adam Botek | Slovakia | 3:19.338 |
| 6 | Francisco Cubelos; Iñigo Peña | Spain | 3:20.215 |
| 7 | Samuele Burgo; Luca Beccaro | Italy | 3:20.298 |
| 8 | Vitaliy Bialko; Raman Piatrushenka | Belarus | 3:20.670 |
| 9 | Cyrille Carré; Étienne Hubert | France | 3:27.273 |
