= 2021 ICF Canoe Sprint World Championships – Men's K-1 500 metres =

Men's K-1 500 metres at the 2021 ICF Canoe Sprint World Championships
- Venue: Lake Bagsværd
- Location: Copenhagen, Denmark
- Dates: 17–19 September
- Competitors: 30 from 30 nations
- Winning time: 1:38.87

Medalists
gold medal	Mikita Borykau	Belarus
silver medal	João Ribeiro	Portugal
bronze medal	Moritz Florstedt	Germany

The men's K-1 500 metres competition at the 2021 ICF Canoe Sprint World Championships in Copenhagen took place on Lake Bagsværd.

== Schedule ==
The schedule was as follows:

Date	Time	Round
Friday 17 September 2021	11:20	Heats
Saturday 18 September 2021	14:06	Semifinals
Sunday 19 September 2021	10:42	Final B
Sunday 19 September 2021	12:30	Final A

All times are Central European Summer Time (UTC+2)

== Results ==
=== Heats ===
The six fastest boats in each heat, plus the three fastest remaining boats advanced to the semifinals.

==== Heat 1 ====
Rank	Kayaker	Country	Time	Notes
1	Tommaso Freschi	Italy	1:43.34	QS
2	Pelayo Roza	Spain	1:43.48	QS
3	Antun Novaković	Croatia	1:44.60	QS
4	Jakub Sliwa	Poland	1:45.22	QS
5	Juan Ignacio Cáceres	Argentina	1:46.22	QS
6	Miroslav Kirchev	Bulgaria	1:49.23	QS
7	Ioannis Odysseos	Cyprus	1:52.20	qS

==== Heat 2 ====
Rank	Kayaker	Country	Time	Notes
1	Moritz Florstedt	Germany	1:43.51	QS
2	Nicolai Winther	Denmark	1:44.31	QS
3	Vitaly Ershov	RCF	1:44.40	QS
4	Ilya Podpolnyy	Israel	1:46.40	QS
5	Brandon Ooi	Singapore	1:46.50	QS
6	Ričardas Nekriošius	Lithuania	1:46.64	QS
7	Nicholas Robinson	Trinidad and Tobago	2:04.16	
–	Mohamed Mrabet	Tunisia	DNS	

==== Heat 3 ====
Rank	Kayaker	Country	Time	Notes
1	Bojan Zdelar	Serbia	1:42.12	QS
2	João Ribeiro	Portugal	1:43.18	QS
3	Daniel Johnson	Great Britain	1:43.55	QS
4	Francis Mouget	France	1:43.72	QS
5	Lars Magne Ullvang	Norway	1:43.80	QS
6	Chrisjan Coetzee	South Africa	1:44.74	QS
7	Bram Brandjes	Netherlands	1:46.99	qS
8	Juan Rodríguez	Mexico	1:59.82	

==== Heat 4 ====
Rank	Kayaker	Country	Time	Notes
1	Jakub Zavřel	Czech Republic	1:43.60	QS
2	Péter István Gál	Hungary	1:43.86	QS
3	Mikita Borykau	Belarus	1:45.83	QS
4	Theodor Orban	Sweden	1:46.92	QS
5	Alex Scott	Canada	1:49.76	QS
6	Eetu Kolehmainen	Finland	1:55.10	QS
7	Konstantinos Benetos	Greece	2:01.65	qS

=== Semifinals ===
Qualification in each semi was as follows:

The fastest three boats advanced to the A final.
The next three fastest boats advanced to the B final.

==== Semifinal 1 ====
Rank	Kayaker	Country	Time	Notes
1	Moritz Florstedt	Germany	1:39.96	QA
2	Jakub Zavřel	Czech Republic	1:40.96	QA
3	Pelayo Roza	Spain	1:41.27	QA
4	Francis Mouget	France	1:41.39	QB
5	Daniel Johnson	Great Britain	1:41.42	QB
6	Bram Brandjes	Netherlands	1:43.04	QB
7	Ričardas Nekriošius	Lithuania	1:44.26	
8	Miroslav Kirchev	Bulgaria	1:45.39	
9	Alex Scott	Canada	1:49.20	

==== Semifinal 2 ====
Rank	Kayaker	Country	Time	Notes
1	Bojan Zdelar	Serbia	1:40.75	QA
2	Chrisjan Coetzee	South Africa	1:42.11	QA
3	Péter István Gál	Hungary	1:42.50	QA
4	Vitaly Ershov	RCF	1:43.00	QB
5	Juan Ignacio Cáceres	Argentina	1:43.12	QB
6	Antun Novaković	Croatia	1:43.13	QB
7	Ilya Podpolnyy	Israel	1:43.68	
8	Theodor Orban	Sweden	1:44.60	
9	Ioannis Odysseos	Cyprus	1:49.43	

==== Semifinal 3 ====
Rank	Kayaker	Country	Time	Notes
1	Mikita Borykau	Belarus	1:40.96	QA
2	João Ribeiro	Portugal	1:41.08	QA
3	Lars Magne Ullvang	Norway	1:41.34	QA
4	Tommaso Freschi	Italy	1:41.41	QB
5	Nicolai Winther	Denmark	1:42.89	QB
6	Jakub Sliwa	Poland	1:43.24	QB
7	Brandon Ooi	Singapore	1:45.21	
8	Eetu Kolehmainen	Finland	1:45.54	
9	Konstantinos Benetos	Greece	1:56.22	

=== Finals ===
==== Final B ====
Competitors in this final raced for positions 10 to 18.

Rank	Kayaker	Country	Time
1	Tommaso Freschi	Italy	1:41.28
2	Francis Mouget	France	1:41.31
3	Daniel Johnson	Great Britain	1:41.93
4	Nicolai Winther	Denmark	1:42.49
5	Vitaly Ershov	RCF	1:43.35
6	Jakub Sliwa	Poland	1:43.71
7	Juan Ignacio Cáceres	Argentina	1:43.72
8	Bram Brandjes	Netherlands	1:44.34
9	Antun Novaković	Croatia	1:44.38

==== Final A ====
Competitors in this final raced for positions 1 to 9, with medals going to the top three.

Rank	Kayaker	Country	Time
1st place, gold medalist(s)	Mikita Borykau	Belarus	1:38.87
2nd place, silver medalist(s)	João Ribeiro	Portugal	1:39.88
3rd place, bronze medalist(s)	Moritz Florstedt	Germany	1:40.04
4	Bojan Zdelar	Serbia	1:40.25
5	Pelayo Roza	Spain	1:41.45
6	Lars Magne Ullvang	Norway	1:41.63
7	Péter István Gál	Hungary	1:42.05
8	Chrisjan Coetzee	South Africa	1:45.77
9	Jakub Zavřel	Czech Republic	2:12.75
