= Czech Republic at the 2016 Summer Olympics =

- IOC code: CZE
- NOC: Czech Olympic Committee
- Website: www.olympic.cz (in Czech and English)

in Rio de Janeiro
- Competitors: 105 in 20 sports
- Flag bearers: Lukáš Krpálek (opening); Josef Dostál (closing)
- Medals Ranked 43rd: Gold 1 Silver 2 Bronze 7 Total 10

Summer Olympics appearances (overview)
- 1996; 2000; 2004; 2008; 2012; 2016; 2020; 2024; 2028

Other related appearances
- Bohemia (1900–1912); Czechoslovakia (1924–1992)

The Czech Republic competed at the 2016 Summer Olympics in Rio de Janeiro, Brazil, from 5 to 21 August 2016. This was the nation's sixth consecutive appearance at the Summer Olympics after splitting from the former Czechoslovakia. The Czech team consisted of 105 athletes, 63 men and 42 women, across twenty sports.

Czech Republic returned home from Rio de Janeiro with a total of 10 medals (1 gold, 2 silver, and 7 bronze), marking the country's second-most successful Olympics, behind tallies of 11 achieved at Atlanta 1996 and London 2012. Three of the medals were awarded to the Czech squad in canoeing and tennis, while the rest to the competitors in judo, track and field, mountain biking, and rowing.

Among the medalists were 2014 world judo champion Lukáš Krpálek, who captured the country's only gold medal in the men's half-heavyweight division (100 kg), and rower Ondřej Synek, who managed to add a bronze to his Olympic career treasury of two silvers in the men's single sculls. Flatwater canoeist and two-time world champion Josef Dostál contributed two of the country's medals, picking up a silver in the K-1 1000 m, and a bronze as a member of the Czech crew in the kayak four, his second consecutive medal in that event. Despite witnessing her three-peat bid come to an end with a bronze at the Games, double Olympic champion Barbora Špotáková cemented her place in history as the first woman to score three medals in the javelin throw. Mountain biker Jaroslav Kulhavý closed out the nation's Olympic campaign by taking home the silver medal in the men's cross-country race, losing his title defense to Switzerland's Nino Schurter.

Despite achieving total of 10 medals, for the first time since 1980 Summer Olympics Czech Republic / Czechoslovakia didn't win any medal in shooting competitions.

== Medalists ==
The following Czech competitors won medals at the Games. In the by discipline sections below, medalists' names are bolded.

Medal	Name	Sport	Event	Date
Gold	Lukáš Krpálek	Judo	Men's 100 kg	11 August
Silver	Josef Dostál	Canoeing	Men's K-1 1000 m	16 August
Silver	Jaroslav Kulhavý	Cycling	Men's cross-country	21 August
Bronze	Jiří Prskavec	Canoeing	Men's K-1	10 August
Bronze	Ondřej Synek	Rowing	Men's single sculls	13 August
Bronze	Petra Kvitová	Tennis	Women's singles	13 August
Bronze	Lucie Šafářová; Barbora Strýcová	Tennis	Women's doubles	13 August
Bronze	Lucie Hradecká; Radek Štěpánek	Tennis	Mixed doubles	14 August
Bronze	Barbora Špotáková	Athletics	Women's javelin throw	18 August
Bronze	Josef Dostál; Daniel Havel; Jan Štěrba; Lukáš Trefil	Canoeing	Men's K-4 1000 m	20 August

**Medals by sport**
**Sport**	1st place, gold medalist(s)	2nd place, silver medalist(s)	3rd place, bronze medalist(s)	Total
Athletics	0	0	1	1
Canoeing	0	1	2	3
Cycling	0	1	0	1
Judo	1	0	0	1
Rowing	0	0	1	1
Tennis	0	0	3	3
**Total**	1	2	7	10

**Medals by day**
**Day**	**Date**	1st place, gold medalist(s)	2nd place, silver medalist(s)	3rd place, bronze medalist(s)	Total
5	August 10	0	0	1	1
6	August 11	1	0	0	1
8	August 13	0	0	3	3
9	August 14	0	0	1	1
11	August 16	0	1	0	1
13	August 18	0	0	1	1
15	August 20	0	0	1	1
16	August 21	0	1	0	1
**Total**		**1**	**2**	**7**	**10**

**Medals by gender**
**Gender**	1st place, gold medalist(s)	2nd place, silver medalist(s)	3rd place, bronze medalist(s)	**Total**	**Percentage**
Male	1	2	3	**6**	60.00%
Female	0	0	3	**3**	30.00%
Mixed	0	0	1	**1**	10.00%
**Total**	**1**	**2**	**7**	**10**	**100%**

Multiple medalists
**Name**	**Sport**	1st place, gold medalist(s)	2nd place, silver medalist(s)	3rd place, bronze medalist(s)	**Total**
Josef Dostál	Canoeing	0	1	1	**2**

== Competitors ==
Czech Olympic Committee fielded a roster of 105 athletes, 63 men and 42 women, to compete across twenty sports at these Games; it was the nation's smallest delegation sent to the Olympics since the breakup of the former Czechoslovakia. Moreover, Czech Republic did not send teams in any of the collective sports for the first time in the nation's Olympic history.

Of the 105 participants, sixty of them attended at least a single Olympiad, with the rest making their debut in Rio de Janeiro. Track and field accounted for the largest number of athletes on the team with 25 entries. Golf, artistic gymnastics, triathlon, weightlifting, and wrestling all had a single competitor.

Thirteen of the nation's past Olympic medalists returned, including four defending champions from London 2012: javelin thrower Barbora Špotáková, modern pentathlete David Svoboda, single sculls rower Miroslava Knapková, and mountain biker Jaroslav Kulhavý. 2008 trap shooting champion David Kostelecký, synchronized swimmer Soňa Bernardová, and former cross-country skier Kateřina Nash in mountain biking headed the full roster of Czech athletes by participating in their fifth Olympics as the most experienced competitors. They were followed by Knapková, Špotakova, Kulhavý, long-distance and open water swimmer Jana Pechanová, double rowing medalist Ondřej Synek in the men's single sculls, and high jumper and 2004 bronze medalist Jaroslav Bába, all of whom vied for their fourth straight Games.

Other notable athletes on the Czech roster included reigning silver medalists Andrea Hlaváčková and Lucie Hradecká in the women's tennis doubles, 2012 bronze medalist and double world champion Zuzana Hejnová in the women's 400 m hurdles, and 2014 world judo champion Lukáš Krpálek, who was selected to be the country's flag bearer in the opening ceremony.

Rifle shooting rookie Filip Nepejchal and freestyle swimming teen Barbora Seemanová, both of whom competing under 18, were Czech Republic's youngest competitors, with Kostelecký rounding out the field as the oldest member (aged 41). Double canoeing champion Martin Doktor served as the team's chef de mission for the Games.

The following is the list of number of competitors participating in the Games:

Sport	Men	Women	Total
Athletics	14	11	25
Badminton	1	1	2
Canoeing	12	1	13
Cycling	9	1	10
Fencing	2	0	2
Golf	0	1	1
Gymnastics	1	0	1
Judo	3	0	3
Modern pentathlon	2	1	3
Rowing	7	3	10
Sailing	2	1	3
Shooting	2	3	5
Swimming	2	6	8
Synchronized swimming	—	2	2
Table tennis	2	2	4
Tennis	3	5	8
Triathlon	0	1	1
Volleyball	0	2	2
Weightlifting	1	0	1
Wrestling	0	1	1
Total	63	42	105

== Athletics ==
Czech athletes have so far achieved qualifying standards in the following athletics events (up to a maximum of 3 athletes in each event):

Key

- Note–Ranks given for track events are within the athlete's heat only
- Q = Qualified for the next round
- q = Qualified for the next round as a fastest loser or, in field events, by position without achieving the qualifying target
- NR = National record
- N/A = Round not applicable for the event
- Bye = Athlete not required to compete in round
- NM = No mark

=== Track & road events ===
Men

Athlete	Event	Heat		Semifinal		Final	
Athlete	Event	Result	Rank	Result	Rank	Result	Rank
Lukáš Gdula	50 km walk	—N/a				DSQ	
Jakub Holuša	1500 m	3:38.31	1 Q	3:40.83	9	did not advance	
Pavel Maslák	400 m	45.54	5 q	45.06	3	did not advance	
Petr Svoboda	110 m hurdles	13.65	6 q	13.67	8	did not advance	

Women

Athlete	Event	Heat		Semifinal		Final	
Athlete	Event	Result	Rank	Result	Rank	Result	Rank
Anežka Drahotová	20 km walk	—N/a				1:30:43	10
Zuzana Hejnová	400 m hurdles	55.54	2 Q	54.55	1 Q	53.92	4
Denisa Rosolová	400 m hurdles	56.36	4 q	57.39	8	did not advance	
Eva Vrabcová-Nývltová	Marathon	—N/a				2:33.51	26

=== Field events ===
Men

Athlete	Event	Qualification		Final	
Athlete	Event	Distance	Position	Distance	Position
Jaroslav Bába	High jump	2.26	=12 q	2.20	14
Michal Balner	Pole vault	5.60	=10 q	5.50	=7
Petr Frydrych	Javelin throw	83.60	5 Q	79.12	12
Radek Juška	Long jump	7.84	13	did not advance	
Jan Kudlička	Pole vault	5.70	=7 q	5.75	=4
Lukáš Melich	Hammer throw	73.14	15	did not advance	
Tomáš Staněk	Shot put	19.76	20	did not advance	
Jakub Vadlejch	Javelin throw	83.27	7 Q	82.42	8
Vítězslav Veselý	Javelin throw	82.85	10 q	82.51	7

Women

Athlete	Event	Qualification		Final	
Athlete	Event	Distance	Position	Distance	Position
Michaela Hrubá	High jump	1.92	18	did not advance	
Romana Maláčová	Pole vault	4.30	=24	did not advance	
Kateřina Šafránková	Hammer throw	68.33	17	did not advance	
Barbora Špotáková	Javelin throw	64.65	2 Q	64.80	3rd place, bronze medalist(s)
Jiřina Svobodová	Pole vault	4.45	=19	did not advance	

=== Combined events ===
Men's decathlon

Athlete	Event	100 m	LJ	SP	HJ	400 m	110H	DT	PV	JT	1500 m	Final	Rank
Adam Helcelet	Result	11.06	7.35	15.11	2.04	49.51	14.37	44.13	4.70	68.20	4:34.41	8291	12
Adam Helcelet	Points	847	898	796	840	837	927	749	819	862	716	8291	12
Jiří Sýkora	Result	11.15	7.00	13.45	1.98	49.88	15.02	44.49	NM	56.99	DNF	6237	25
Jiří Sýkora	Points	827	814	695	785	820	847	756	0	693	0	6237	25

Women's heptathlon

Athlete	Event	100H	HJ	SP	200 m	LJ	JT	800 m	Final	Rank
Kateřina Cachová	Result	13.19	1.77	12.38	24.32	5.91	37.77	2:18.95	5958	24
Kateřina Cachová	Points	1096	941	686	950	822	625	838	5958	24
Eliška Klučinová	Result	14.07	1.80	14.41	25.37	6.08	46.73	2:22.81	6077	22
Eliška Klučinová	Points	968	978	821	853	874	797	786	6077	22

== Badminton ==
The Czech Republic has qualified two badminton players for each of the following events into the Olympic tournament. Remarkably going to their third Olympics, Kristína Gavnholt was selected among the top 34 individual shuttlers in the women's singles based on the BWF World Rankings as of 5 May 2016, while her counterpart Petr Koukal picked up one of the spare athlete berths from the doubles as the next highest-ranked eligible player in the men's singles.

Athlete	Event	Group Stage			Elimination	Quarterfinal	Semifinal	Final / BM	
Athlete	Event	Opposition Score	Opposition Score	Rank	Opposition Score	Opposition Score	Opposition Score	Opposition Score	Rank
Petr Koukal	Men's singles	Ouseph (GBR); L (14–21, 18–21)	Sasaki (JPN); L (10–21, 21–16, 12–21)	3	did not advance				
Kristína Gavnholt	Women's singles	Yamaguchi (JPN); L (22–20, 12–21, 15–21)	Tee J Y (MAS); L (20–22, 21–15)	3	did not advance				

== Canoeing ==
=== Slalom ===
Czech canoeists have qualified a maximum of one boat in each of the following classes through the 2015 ICF Canoe Slalom World Championships. The roster of Czech slalom canoeists will be announced on 15 May 2016 as a result of their top performances at three selection meets of the Olympic Trials: two domestic races in Veltrusy ( 16 to 17 April) and Prague ( 23 to 24 April) and the European Championships ( 13 to 15 May) in Liptovský Mikuláš, Slovakia.

Athlete	Event	Preliminary						Semifinal		Final	
Athlete	Event	Run 1	Rank	Run 2	Rank	Best	Rank	Time	Rank	Time	Rank
Vítězslav Gebas	Men's C-1	109.92	14	102.78	12	102.78	14 Q	98.77	5 Q	97.57	4
Jonáš Kašpar; Marek Šindler	Men's C-2	106.32	6	103.43	2	103.43	4 Q	108.09	2 Q	108.35	8
Jiří Prskavec	Men's K-1	88.71	3	101.18	17	88.71	7 Q	90.62	2 Q	88.99	3rd place, bronze medalist(s)
Kateřina Kudějová	Women's K-1	102.06	3	106.10	8	102.06	5 Q	103.78	4 Q	108.76	10

=== Sprint ===
Czech canoeists have qualified a total of four boats in each of the following distances for the Games through the 2015 ICF Canoe Sprint World Championships. Meanwhile, one additional boat was awarded to the Czech squad in men's C-2 1000 m by virtue of a top two national finish at the 2016 European Qualification Regatta in Duisburg, Germany.

The sprint canoeing team, led by London 2012 bronze medalist Josef Dostál in the men's kayak four, was named to the Olympic roster on 7 June 2016.

Men

Athlete	Event	Heats		Semifinals		Final	
Athlete	Event	Time	Rank	Time	Rank	Time	Rank
Josef Dostál	K-1 1000 m	3:35.342	1 Q	3:36.384	4 FA	3:32.145	2nd place, silver medalist(s)
Martin Fuksa	C-1 200 m	40.311	3 Q	40.311	4 FB	39.760	9
Martin Fuksa	C-1 1000 m	4:01.492	2 Q	4:01.793	1 FA	4:03.322	5
Filip Šváb	K-1 200 m	35.567	7	did not advance			
Filip Dvořák; Jaroslav Radoň	C-2 1000 m	3:36.818	4 Q	3:42.166	2 FA	3:49.352	7
Daniel Havel; Jan Štěrba	K-2 1000 m	3:53.907	6 Q	3:21.569	4 FB	3:25.966	12
Josef Dostál; Daniel Havel; Jan Štěrba; Lukáš Trefil	K-4 1000 m	2:52.027	1 FA	Bye		3:05.176	3rd place, bronze medalist(s)

Qualification Legend: FA = Qualify to final (medal); FB = Qualify to final B (non-medal)

== Cycling ==
=== Road ===
Czech riders qualified for a maximum of four quota places in the men's Olympic road race by virtue of their top 15 final national ranking in the 2015 UCI World and Europe Tour. The men's road cycling team was named to the Olympic roster on 23 June 2016.

Athlete	Event	Time	Rank
Jan Bárta	Men's road race	did not finish	
Jan Bárta	Men's time trial	1:15:56.91	15
Leopold König	Men's road race	did not finish	
Leopold König	Men's time trial	1:15:23.64	11
Zdeněk Štybar	Men's road race	did not finish	
Petr Vakoč	Men's road race	6:30:05	58

=== Track ===
Following the completion of the 2016 UCI Track Cycling World Championships, Czech riders failed to win a quota place in the men's team sprint, but they did manage to accumulate a single berth in the men's keirin and two in the men's sprint, by virtue of their final individual UCI Olympic rankings in those events.

Sprint

Athlete	Event	Qualification		Round 1	Repechage 1	Round 2	Repechage 2	Quarterfinals	Semifinals	Final	
Athlete	Event	Time Speed (km/h)	Rank	Opposition Time Speed (km/h)	Opposition Time Speed (km/h)	Opposition Time Speed (km/h)	Opposition Time Speed (km/h)	Opposition Time Speed (km/h)	Opposition Time Speed (km/h)	Opposition Time Speed (km/h)	Rank
Pavel Kelemen	Men's sprint	9.969; 72.223	14 Q	Bauge (FRA); L	Constable (AUS); Zieliński (POL); L	did not advance					

Keirin

Athlete	Event	1st Round	Repechage	2nd Round	Final
Athlete	Event	Rank	Rank	Rank	Rank
Pavel Kelemen	Men's keirin	6 R	4	did not advance	

=== Mountain biking ===
Czech mountain bikers qualified for three men's quota places into the Olympic cross-country race, as a result of the nation's fourth-place finish in the UCI Olympic Ranking List of 25 May 2016. Due to the lack of eligible NOCs for Africa on the list, the unused berth was added to the Czech mountain biking team as the next highest-ranked nation, not yet qualified, in the women's cross-country race. The mountain biking team, highlighted by reigning Olympic men's cross-country champion Jaroslav Kulhavý, was announced on 24 May 2016.

Athlete	Event	Time	Rank
Ondřej Cink	Men's cross-country	1:38:18	14
Jaroslav Kulhavý	Men's cross-country	1:34:18	2nd place, silver medalist(s)
Jan Škarnitzl	Men's cross-country	1:41:11	22
Kateřina Nash	Women's cross-country	1:32:25	5

== Fencing ==
The Czech Republic has entered two fencers into the Olympic competition. 2010 Youth Olympian Alexander Choupenitch secured a spot in the men's foil as one of the two highest-ranked fencers coming from the European zone in the FIE Adjusted Official Rankings. Meanwhile, Jiří Beran rounded out the Czech fencing roster as the sole winner of the men's épée at the European Zonal Qualifier in Prague.

Athlete	Event	Round of 64	Round of 32	Round of 16	Quarterfinal	Semifinal	Final / BM	
Athlete	Event	Opposition Score	Opposition Score	Opposition Score	Opposition Score	Opposition Score	Opposition Score	Rank
Jiří Beran	Men's épée	Schwantes (BRA); L 6–8	did not advance					
Alexander Choupenitch	Men's foil	Bye	Abouelkassem (EGY); L 8–15	did not advance				

== Golf ==
Czech Republic has entered one golfer into the Olympic tournament. Klára Spilková (world no. 279) qualified directly among the top 60 eligible players for the women's event based on the IGF World Rankings as of 11 July 2016.

Athlete	Event	Round 1	Round 2	Round 3	Round 4	Total		
Athlete	Event	Score	Score	Score	Score	Score	Par	Rank
Klára Spilková	Women's	77	73	71	74	295	+11	=48

== Gymnastics ==
=== Artistic ===
The Czech Republic has entered one artistic gymnast into the Olympic competition. David Jessen, son of 1988 Olympian Hana Říčná, claimed his Olympic spot in the men's apparatus and all-around events at the Olympic Test Event in Rio de Janeiro.

Men

Athlete	Event	Qualification								Final							
Athlete	Event	Apparatus						Total	Rank	Apparatus						Total	Rank
Athlete	Event	F	PH	R	V	PB	HB	Total	Rank	F	PH	R	V	PB	HB	Total	Rank
David Jessen	Individual	12.233	12.166	13.336	14.500	13.100	14.316	79.681	47	did not advance							

== Judo ==
The Czech Republic has qualified three judokas for each of the following weight classes at the Games. London 2012 Olympian Lukáš Krpálek and returnee Pavel Petřikov were ranked among the top 22 eligible judokas for men in the IJF World Ranking List of 30 May 2016, while Jaromír Ježek at men's lightweight (73 kg) earned a continental quota spot from the European region as the Czech Republic's top-ranked judoka outside of direct qualifying position.

Athlete	Event	Round of 64	Round of 32	Round of 16	Quarterfinals	Semifinals	Repechage	Final / BM	
Athlete	Event	Opposition Result	Opposition Result	Opposition Result	Opposition Result	Opposition Result	Opposition Result	Opposition Result	Rank
Pavel Petřikov	Men's −60 kg	Bye	Mogopa (BOT); W 110–000	Takato (JPN); L 000–100	did not advance				
Jaromír Ježek	Men's −73 kg	Estrada (CUB); L 002–010	did not advance						
Lukáš Krpálek	Men's −100 kg	Bye	Fonseca (POR); W 010–001	Rakov (KAZ); W 000–000 S	Haga (JPN); W 000–000 S	Maret (FRA); W 100–000	Bye	Gasimov (AZE); W 100–000	1st place, gold medalist(s)

== Modern pentathlon ==
Czech athletes have qualified for the following spots to compete in modern pentathlon. Defending Olympic champion David Svoboda and rookie Jan Kuf secured a selection in the men's event by gaining two of the eight Olympic slots reserved for their team from the 2015 European Championships. Meanwhile, Barbora Kodedová granted an invitation from UIPM to compete in the women's event, as one of the next highest-ranked eligible modern pentathletes, not yet qualified, in the World Rankings as of 1 June 2016.

Athlete	Event	Fencing (épée one touch)				Swimming (200 m freestyle)			Riding (show jumping)			Combined: shooting/running (10 m air pistol)/(3200 m)			Total points	Final rank
Athlete	Event	RR	BR	Rank	MP points	Time	Rank	MP points	Penalties	Rank	MP points	Time	Rank	MP Points	Total points	Final rank
Jan Kuf	Men's	19–16	1	15	215	2:05.84	26	323	EL	=33	0	12:15.62	34	565	1103	36
David Svoboda	Men's	21–14	0	7	226	2:05.59	23	324	18	19	282	11:20.92	10	620	1452	9
Barbora Kodedová	Women's	20–15	0	10	220	2:24.70	34	266	51	28	249	13:25.36	29	495	1230	26

== Rowing ==
The Czech Republic has qualified a total of five boats for each of the following rowing classes into the Olympic regatta. Three rowing crews confirmed Olympic places for their boats each in both the men's and women's single sculls, and men's lightweight four at the 2015 FISA World Championships in Lac d'Aiguebelette, France, while the rowers competing in the men's pair and women's double sculls were added to the Czech roster with their top two finish at the 2016 European & Final Qualification Regatta in Lucerne, Switzerland.

Men

Athlete	Event	Heats		Repechage		Quarterfinals		Semifinals		Final	
Athlete	Event	Time	Rank	Time	Rank	Time	Rank	Time	Rank	Time	Rank
Ondřej Synek	Single sculls	7:21.90	1 QF	Bye		6:50.51	2 SA/B	6:58.56	1 FA	6:44.10	3rd place, bronze medalist(s)
Lukáš Helešic; Jakub Podrazil	Pair	6:42.71	3 SA/B	Bye		—N/a		6:32.85	6 FB	7:00.04	7
Jiří Kopáč; Jan Vetešník; Ondřej Vetešník; Miroslav Vraštil Jr.	Lightweight four	6:39.95	5 R	6:04.30	3 SA/B	—N/a		6:33.43	6 FB	6:43.52	12

Women

Athlete	Event	Heats		Repechage		Quarterfinals		Semifinals		Final	
Athlete	Event	Time	Rank	Time	Rank	Time	Rank	Time	Rank	Time	Rank
Miroslava Knapková	Single sculls	8:28.90	2 QF	Bye		7:37.04	2 SA/B	7:47.53	4 FB	7:22.86	7
Lenka Antošová; Kristýna Fleissnerová	Double sculls	7:35.85	4 R	7:03.68	3 SA/B	—N/a		7:03.79	6 FB	7:43.77	10

Qualification Legend: FA=Final A (medal); FB=Final B (non-medal); FC=Final C (non-medal); FD=Final D (non-medal); FE=Final E (non-medal); FF=Final F (non-medal); SA/B=Semifinals A/B; SC/D=Semifinals C/D; SE/F=Semifinals E/F; QF=Quarterfinals; R=Repechage

== Sailing ==
Czech sailors have qualified one boat in each of the following classes through the 2014 ISAF Sailing World Championships, the individual fleet Worlds, and European qualifying regattas.

Athlete	Event	Race													Net points	Final rank
Athlete	Event	1	2	3	4	5	6	7	8	9	10	11	12	M*	Net points	Final rank
Karel Lavický	Men's RS:X	26	30	30	30	~~DNF~~	26	24	DNF	29	DNF	25	31	EL	324	31
Viktor Teplý	Men's Laser	29	18	30	19	13	23	29	29	32	~~34~~	—N/a		EL	222	28
Veronika Fenclová	Women's Laser Radial	11	7	11	16	9	16	8	~~22~~	17	19	—N/a		EL	113	12

M = Medal race; EL = Eliminated – did not advance into the medal race

== Shooting ==
Czech shooters have achieved quota places for the following events by virtue of their best finishes at the 2014 and 2015 ISSF World Championships, the 2015 ISSF World Cup series, and European Championships or Games, as long as they obtained a minimum qualifying score (MQS) by 31 March 2016.

Athlete	Event	Qualification		Semifinal		Final	
Athlete	Event	Points	Rank	Points	Rank	Points	Rank
David Kostelecký	Men's trap	118	5 Q	13	3 q	9	4
Filip Nepejchal	Men's 10 m air rifle	619.9	35	—N/a		did not advance	
Filip Nepejchal	Men's 50 m rifle prone	620.5	33	—N/a		did not advance	
Filip Nepejchal	Men's 50 m rifle 3 positions	1169	21	—N/a		did not advance	
Adéla Bruns	Women's 10 m air rifle	411.8	32	—N/a		did not advance	
Adéla Bruns	Women's 50 m rifle 3 positions	582	8 Q	—N/a		404.3	7
Libuše Jahodová	Women's skeet	58	20	did not advance			
Nikola Mazurová	Women's 10 m air rifle	414.4	18	—N/a		did not advance	
Nikola Mazurová	Women's 50 m rifle 3 positions	575	25	—N/a		did not advance	

Qualification Legend: Q = Qualify for the next round; q = Qualify for the bronze medal (shotgun)

== Swimming ==
Czech swimmers have so far achieved qualifying standards in the following events (up to a maximum of 2 swimmers in each event at the Olympic Qualifying Time (OQT), and potentially 1 at the Olympic Selection Time (OST)):

Men

Athlete	Event	Heat		Final	
Athlete	Event	Time	Rank	Time	Rank
Pavel Janeček	400 m individual medley	4:22.09	24	did not advance	
Jan Micka	400 m freestyle	3:49.97	29	did not advance	
Jan Micka	1500 m freestyle	14:58.69	12	did not advance	

Women

Athlete	Event	Heat		Semifinal		Final	
Athlete	Event	Time	Rank	Time	Rank	Time	Rank
Simona Baumrtová	100 m backstroke	1:01.08	17	did not advance			
Simona Baumrtová	200 m backstroke	2:13.26	23	did not advance			
Simona Baumrtová	200 m individual medley	2:17.21	36	did not advance			
Martina Moravčíková	100 m breaststroke	1:08.50	26	did not advance			
Martina Moravčíková	200 m breaststroke	2:27.51	18	did not advance			
Jana Pechanová	10 km open water	—N/a				1:59:07.7	19
Barbora Seemanová	200 m freestyle	2:00.26	31	did not advance			
Lucie Svěcená	100 m butterfly	59.45	27	did not advance			
Barbora Závadová	200 m individual medley	2:14.45	21	did not advance			
Barbora Závadová	400 m individual medley	4:38.53	14	—N/a		did not advance	
Simona Baumrtová; Martina Moravčíková; Barbora Seemanová; Lucie Svěcená	4 × 100 m medley relay	DSQ		—N/a		did not advance	

== Synchronized swimming ==
The Czech Republic has fielded a squad of two synchronized swimmers to compete only in the women's duet by virtue of their ninth-place finish at the FINA Olympic test event in Rio de Janeiro.

Athlete	Event	Technical routine		Free routine (preliminary)			Free routine (final)		
Athlete	Event	Points	Rank	Points	Total (technical + free)	Rank	Points	Total (technical + free)	Rank
Soňa Bernardová; Alžběta Dufková	Duet	80.0640	18	80.5333	160.5973	18	did not advance		

== Table tennis ==
The Czech Republic has entered four athletes into the table tennis competition at the Games. London 2012 Olympian Iveta Vacenovská was automatically selected among the top 22 eligible players in the women's singles based on the ITTF Olympic Rankings. Meanwhile, Lubomír Jančařík, Dmitrij Prokopcov, and Hana Matelová granted their invitations from ITTF to compete in each of their respective singles events as one of the next seven highest-ranked eligible players, not yet qualified, on the Olympic Ranking List.

Athlete	Event	Preliminary	Round 1	Round 2	Round 3	Round of 16	Quarterfinals	Semifinals	Final / BM	
Athlete	Event	Opposition Result	Opposition Result	Opposition Result	Opposition Result	Opposition Result	Opposition Result	Opposition Result	Opposition Result	Rank
Lubomír Jančařík	Men's singles	Bye	Kenjaev (UZB); L 2–4	did not advance						
Dmitrij Prokopcov	Men's singles	Bye	Toriola (NGR); L 2–4	did not advance						
Hana Matelová	Women's singles	Bye	Zhang (CAN); L 3–4	did not advance						
Iveta Vacenovská	Women's singles	Bye	Ruano (COL); W 4–0	Bilenko (UKR); L 0–4	did not advance					

== Tennis ==
The Czech Republic has entered eight tennis players (two men and six women) into the Olympic tournament. Tomáš Berdych (world no. 8) and Jiří Veselý (world no. 67) qualified directly for the men's singles as two of the top 56 eligible players in the ATP World Rankings, while Petra Kvitová (world no. 11), Karolína Plíšková (world no. 17), Lucie Šafářová (world no. 29), and Barbora Strýcová (world no. 30) did so for the women's singles based on their WTA World Rankings as of 6 June 2016.

Having been directly entered to the singles, Berdych and Veselý also opted to play with their partners Radek Štěpánek and Lukáš Rosol, respectively, in the men's doubles. Meanwhile, reigning silver medalists Andrea Hlaváčková and Lucie Hradecká teamed up together for their second Olympic stint in the women's doubles by virtue of the latter's top-10 WTA ranking.

On 16 July 2016, Berdych and Plíšková announced that both of them withdrew from the Games due to personal and family concerns on Zika virus. Instead, Rosol (world no. 71) took over Berdych's place in the men's singles and doubles. On 27 July 2016, Veselý joined them as one of the Czech tennis players to be pulled out from the Games, citing chest pains.

Men

Athlete	Event	Round of 64	Round of 32	Round of 16	Quarterfinals	Semifinals	Final / BM	
Athlete	Event	Opposition Score	Opposition Score	Opposition Score	Opposition Score	Opposition Score	Opposition Score	Rank
Lukáš Rosol	Singles	Paire (FRA); L 6–3, 3–6, 4–6	did not advance					
Lukáš Rosol; Radek Štěpánek	Doubles	—N/a	Ferrer / Bautista Agut (ESP); L 1–6, 4–6	did not advance				

Women

Athlete	Event	Round of 64	Round of 32	Round of 16	Quarterfinals	Semifinals	Final / BM	
Athlete	Event	Opposition Score	Opposition Score	Opposition Score	Opposition Score	Opposition Score	Opposition Score	Rank
Lucie Hradecká	Singles	Wozniacki (DEN); L 2–6, 2–6	did not advance					
Petra Kvitová	Singles	Babos (HUN); W 6–1, 6–2	Wozniacki (DEN); W 6–2, 6–4	Makarova (RUS); W 4–6, 6–4, 6–4	Svitolina (UKR); W 6–2, 6–0	Puig (PUR); L 4–6, 6–1, 3–6	Keys (USA); W 7–5, 2–6, 6–2	3rd place, bronze medalist(s)
Lucie Šafářová	Singles	Knapp (ITA); W 4–6, 6–1, 6–1	Flipkens (BEL); L 2–6, ret	did not advance				
Barbora Strýcová	Singles	Wickmayer (BEL); W 7–6^{(8–6)}, 6–1	Errani (ITA); L 2–6, 2–6	did not advance				
Andrea Hlaváčková; Lucie Hradecká	Doubles	—N/a	Savchuk / Svitolina (UKR); W 7–6^{(7–1)}, 1–6, 6–4	Peng S / Zhang S (CHN); W 6–4, 6–4	Kasatkina / Kuznetsova (RUS); W 6–1, 4–6, 7–5	Bacsinszky / Hingis (SUI); L 7–5, 6–7^{(3–7)}, 2–6	Šafářová / Strýcová (CZE); L 5–7, 1–6	4
Lucie Šafářová; Barbora Strýcová	Doubles	—N/a	S Williams / V Williams (USA); W 6–3, 6–4	Bourchard / Dabrowski (CAN); W 6–7^{(4–7)}, 6–2, 6–4	Errani / Vinci (ITA); W 4–6, 6–4, 6–4	Makarova / Vesnina (RUS); L 6–7^{(7–9)}, 4–6	Hlaváčková / Hradecká (CZE); W 7–5, 6–1	3rd place, bronze medalist(s)

Mixed

Athlete	Event	Round of 16	Quarterfinals	Semifinals	Final / BM	
Athlete	Event	Opposition Score	Opposition Score	Opposition Score	Opposition Score	Rank
Lucie Hradecká; Radek Štěpánek	Doubles	Muguruza / Nadal (ESP); W WO	Begu / Tecău (ROU); W 6–4, 7–5	Mattek-Sands / Sock (USA); L 4–6, 6–7^{(3–6)}	Mirza / Bopanna (IND); W 6–1, 7–5	3rd place, bronze medalist(s)

== Triathlon ==
The Czech Republic has entered one triathlete to compete at the Games. Two-time Olympian Vendula Frintová was ranked among the top 40 eligible triathletes in the women's event based on the ITU Olympic Qualification List as of 15 May 2016.

Athlete	Event	Swim (1.5 km)	Trans 1	Bike (40 km)	Trans 2	Run (10 km)	Total Time	Rank
Vendula Frintová	Women's	19:21	0:56	1:04:27	0:36	36:29	2:01:49	27

== Volleyball ==
=== Beach ===
The Czech Republic women's beach volleyball team qualified directly for the Olympics by virtue of their top two national finish at the 2016 FIVB Continental Cup in Sochi, Russia. The place was awarded to London 2012 Olympian Markéta Sluková and her rookie partner Barbora Hermannová.

Athlete	Event	Preliminary round				Lucky Loser	Round of 16	Quarterfinals	Semifinals	Final / BM	
Athlete	Event	Opposition Score	Opposition Score	Opposition Score	Rank	Opposition Score	Opposition Score	Opposition Score	Opposition Score	Opposition Score	Rank
Barbora Hermannová; Markéta Sluková	Women's	Bednarczuk / Seixas (BRA); L 1–2 (21–19, 17–21, 11–15)	Baquerizo / Fernández (ESP); L 0–2 (15–21, 19–21)	Gallay / Klug (ARG); W 2–1 (13–21, 21–19, 15–8)	3	Birlova / Ukolova (RUS); L 1–2 (19–21, 21–12, 10–15)	did not advance				

== Weightlifting ==
The Czech Republic has qualified one male weightlifter for the Rio Olympics by virtue of a top seven national finish at the 2016 European Championships. The team must allocate this place by 20 June 2016.

Athlete	Event	Snatch		Clean & Jerk		Total	Rank
Athlete	Event	Result	Rank	Result	Rank	Total	Rank
Jiří Orság	Men's +105 kg	185	14	240	=6	425	8

== Wrestling ==
The Czech Republic has received a spare host berth freed up by Brazil as the next highest-ranked eligible nation, not yet qualified, to send a wrestler competing in the women's freestyle 63 kg to the Olympics, based on the results from the World Championships.

Key:
- VT – Victory by Fall.
- PP – Decision by Points – the loser with technical points.
- PO – Decision by Points – the loser without technical points.
- ST – Technical superiority – the loser without technical points and a margin of victory of at least 8 (Greco-Roman) or 10 (freestyle) points.

Women's freestyle

Athlete	Event	Qualification	Round of 16	Quarterfinal	Semifinal	Repechage 1	Repechage 2	Final / BM	
Athlete	Event	Opposition Result	Opposition Result	Opposition Result	Opposition Result	Opposition Result	Opposition Result	Opposition Result	Rank
Adéla Hanzlíčková	−63 kg	Bye	Johansson (SWE); L 0–4 ^{ST}	did not advance					20

== See also ==
- Czech Republic at the 2016 Summer Paralympics
