= 2024 ICF Canoe Sprint World Championships – Men's K-1 500 metres =

Men's K-1 500 metres at the 2024 ICF Canoe Sprint World Championships
- Venue: Rowing and Canoeing Race Course in Samarkand
- Location: Samarkand, Uzbekistan
- Dates: 23–25 August
- Competitors: 30 from 30 nations
- Winning time: 1:37.309

Medalists
gold medal	Josef Dostál	Czech Republic
silver medal	Fernando Pimenta	Portugal
bronze medal	Uladzislau Kravets	Authorised Neutral Athletes

The men's K-1 500 metres competition at the 2024 ICF Canoe Sprint World Championships in Samarkand took place in Rowing and Canoeing Race Course in Samarkand.

== Schedule ==
The schedule is as follows:

Date	Time	Round
Friday 23 August 2024	15:36	Heats
Friday 23 August 2024	17:12	Semifinals
Sunday 25 August 2024	11:54	Final B
Sunday 25 August 2024	12:18	Final A

== Results ==
=== Heats ===
The fastest six fastest boats (QS) in each heat plus the fastest three remaining boats (qs), advanced to the semi-finals.

==== Heat 1 ====
Rank	Canoeist	Country	Time	Notes
1	Timon Maurer	Austria	1:43.415	QS
2	Samuel Baláž	Slovakia	1:43.934	QS
3	Gonzalo Lo Moro	Argentina	1:45.845	QS
4	Thomas MacGibbon	New Zealand	1:49.479	QS
5	Gunnar Nydal Eide	Norway	1:53.208	QS
6	Himanshu Tandan	India	1:58.762	QS
7	Kohei Fukuda	Japan	2:03.123	
	Nekruz Zuhurov	Tajikistan	DNS	

==== Heat 2 ====
Rank	Canoeist	Country	Time	Notes
1	Fernando Pimenta	Portugal	1:43.773	QS
2	Bojan Zdelar	Serbia	1:44.760	QS
3	Uladzislau Kravets	Individual Neutral Athletes	1:47.262	QS
4	Matevž Manfreda	Slovenia	1:48.869	QS
5	Mateo Pérez	Colombia	1:49.798	QS
6	Rysbek Tolomushev	Kyrgyzstan	1:49.996	QS
7	Daniel Roman	Venezuela	1:51.058	qS
	Kyle Friedenstein	South Africa	DNS	

==== Heat 3 ====
Rank	Canoeist	Country	Time	Notes
1	Josef Dostál	Czech Republic	1:43.265	QS
2	Sławomir Witczak	Poland	35.751	QS
3	Oleg Gusev	Germany	35.844	QS
4	Sulaiman Al-Samarraie	Iraq	1:48.402	QS
5	Ozodjon Amriddinov	Uzbekistan	1:48.544	QS
6	Sergii Tokarnytskyi	Kazakhstan	1:50.604	QS
7	Jeyhun Valikhanov	Azerbaijan	1:53.254	qS
8	Zhang Yueping	China	1:54.022	

==== Heat 4 ====
Rank	Canoeist	Country	Time	Notes
1	Thorbjørn Rask	Denmark	1:43.198	QS
2	Oleh Kukharyk	Ukraine	1:43.642	QS
3	Alex Graneri	Spain	1:44.083	QS
4	Levente Kurucz	Hungary	1:45.793	QS
5	Aldis Artūrs Vilde	Latvia	1:45.815	QS
6	Cho Gwang-hee	South Korea	1:47.847	QS
7	Augustus Cook	United States	1:49.360	qS
8	Ooi Brandon Wei Cheng	Singapore	1:57.416	qS

=== Semifinals ===
The fastest three boats in each semi advanced to the A final. The next three fastest boats in each semi advanced to the final B.

==== Semifinal 1 ====
Rank	Canoeist	Country	Time	Notes
1	Gunnar Nydal Eide	Norway	1:42.041	FA
2	Levente Kurucz	Hungary	1:42.125	FA
3	Sławomir Witczak	Poland	1:42.599	FA
4	Bojan Zdelar	Serbia	1:42.645	FB
5	Alex Graneri	Spain	1:43.692	FB
6	Timon Maurer	Austria	1:45.123	FB
7	Augustus Cook	United States	1:47.516	
8	Ozodjon Amriddinov	Uzbekistan	1:51.353	
9	Rysbek Tolomushev	Kyrgyzstan	1:51.532	

==== Semifinal 2 ====
Rank	Canoeist	Country	Time	Notes
1	Fernando Pimenta	Portugal	1:44.216	FA
2	Oleg Gusev	Germany	1:44.903	FA
3	Oleh Kukharyk	Ukraine	1:45.495	FA
4	Cho Gwang-hee	South Korea	1:45.557	FB
5	Gonzalo Lo Moro	Argentina	1:46.826	FB
6	Thomas MacGibbon	New Zealand	1:50.399	FB
7	Sulaiman Al-Samarraie	Iraq	1:51.191	
8	Mateo Pérez	Colombia	2:00.189	
9	Daniel Roman	Venezuela	2:00.278	

==== Semifinal 3 ====
Rank	Canoeist	Country	Time	Notes
1	Josef Dostál	Czech Republic	1:42.674	FA
2	Uladzislau Kravets	Individual Neutral Athletes	1:43.112	FA
3	Samuel Baláž	Slovakia	1:43.277	FA
4	Thorbjørn Rask	Denmark	1:44.504	FB
5	Aldis Artūrs Vilde	Latvia	1:47.264	FB
6	Matevž Manfreda	Slovenia	1:49.703	FB
7	Sergii Tokarnytskyi	Kazakhstan	1:54.586	
8	Jeyhun Valikhanov	Azerbaijan	1:55.066	
9	Himanshu Tandan	India	2:08.542	

=== Finals ===
==== Final B ====
Competitors in this final raced for positions 10 to 18.

Rank	Canoeist	Country	Time
1	Thorbjørn Rask	Denmark	1:39.004
2	Aldis Artūrs Vilde	Latvia	1:39.495
3	Timon Maurer	Austria	1:39.999
4	Alex Graneri	Spain	1:40.046
5	Cho Gwang-hee	South Korea	1:42.576
6	Thomas MacGibbon	New Zealand	1:43.280
7	Bojan Zdelar	Serbia	1:43.301
8	Gonzalo Lo Moro	Argentina	1:44.118
9	Matevž Manfreda	Slovenia	1:45.991

==== Final A ====
Competitors raced for positions 1 to 9, with medals going to the top three.

Rank	Canoeist	Country	Time
1	Josef Dostál	Czech Republic	1:37.309
2	Fernando Pimenta	Portugal	1:38.049
3	Uladzislau Kravets	Individual Neutral Athletes	1:38.437
4	Sławomir Witczak	Poland	1:39.003
5	Gunnar Nydal Eide	Norway	1:39.631
6	Levente Kurucz	Hungary	1:40.125
7	Samuel Baláž	Slovakia	1:40.288
8	Oleg Gusev	Germany	1:41.107
9	Oleh Kukharyk	Ukraine	1:45.180
