= 2025 ICF Canoe Sprint World Championships – Men's K-1 500 metres =

Men's K-1 500 metres at the 2025 ICF Canoe Sprint World Championships
- Venue: Idroscalo Regatta Course
- Location: Milan, Italy
- Dates: 21–24 August
- Competitors: 44 from 44 nations
- Winning time: 1:38.43

Medalists
gold medal	Josef Dostál	Czech Republic
silver medal	Ádám Varga	Hungary
bronze medal	Alex Granieri	Spain

The men's K-1 500 metres competition at the 2025 ICF Canoe Sprint World Championships in Milan took place in Idroscalo Regatta Course.

== Schedule ==
The schedule is as follows:

Date	Time	Round
Thursday 21 August 2025	09:45	Heats
Saturday 23 August 2025	10:10	Semifinals
Sunday 24 August 2025	09:00	Final C
Sunday 24 August 2025	09:05	Final B
Sunday 24 August 2025	10:40	Final A

== Results ==
=== Heats ===
The four fastest boats in each heat (QS) and fastest three remaining boats 5th ranked boats (qS) advanced to the semi finals.

==== Heat 1 ====
Rank	Canoeist	Country	Time	Notes
1	Ádám Varga	Hungary	1:38.23	QS
2	Piotr Morawski	Poland	1:39.11	QS
3	Giacomo Cinti	Italy	1:39.54	QS
4	Oleh Kukharyk	Ukraine	1:39.68	QS
5	Branko Lagundžić	Serbia	1:39.83	qS
6	Cho Gwang-hee	South Korea	1:40.31	
7	Mateo Pérez	Colombia	1:47.25	
8	Praison Buasamrong	Thailand	1:54.79	

==== Heat 2 ====
Rank	Canoeist	Country	Time	Notes
1	Josef Dostál	Czech Republic	1:39.14	QS
2	Simonas Maldonis	Lithuania	1:40.87	QS
3	Shakhriyor Makhkamov	Uzbekistan	1:40.89	QS
4	Guillaume Keller	France	1:41.42	QS
5	Taishi Tanada	Japan	1:41.48	qS
6	Indra Hidayat	Indonesia	1:47.15	
7	Kristians Lauris	Latvia	1:47.75	
8	Jeyhun Valikhanov	Azerbaijan	1:50.92	

==== Heat 3 ====
Rank	Canoeist	Country	Time	Notes
1	Matías Otero	Uruguay	1:39.96	QS
2	Gunnar Nydal Eide	Norway	1:40.70	QS
3	Ali Aghamirzaei	Iran	1:41.36	QS
4	Denis Myšák	Slovakia	1:41.46	QS
5	Nicholas Matveev	Canada	1:41.73	qS
6	Henry van der Walt	South Africa	1:46.10	
7	Mohamed Ismail	Egypt	1:48.10	
8	Sergio Velásquez	Bolivia	2:06.73	

==== Heat 4 ====
Rank	Canoeist	Country	Time	Notes
1	Tom Liebscher	Germany	1:39.76	QS
2	Thorbjørn Rask	Denmark	1:40.37	QS
3	Dzianis Yermolenka	Individual Neutral Athletes	1:41.53	QS
4	Erik Andersson	Sweden	1:44.60	QS
5	Niko Keskinen	Finland	1:46.91	
6	Alden Ler	Singapore	1:46.93	
7	Eldrik Dailoo	Seychelles	2:39.76	
	Abdillahi Youssouf Elmi	Djibouti	DNS	

==== Heat 5 ====
Rank	Canoeist	Country	Time	Notes
1	Maxim Spesivtsev	Individual Neutral Athletes	1:40.47	QS
2	Fernando Pimenta	Portugal	1:41.36	QS
3	Zhang Dong	China	1:42.00	QS
4	Augustus Cook	United States	1:43.00	QS
5	Iliya Nadernejad	ICF	1:49.30	
6	Kannan Koluthadil Regi	India	1:54.67	
	Musa Bangire	Uganda	DNS	

==== Heat 6 ====
Rank	Canoeist	Country	Time	Notes
1	Alex Graneri	Spain	1:39.64	QS
2	Timon Maurer	Austria	1:40.33	QS
3	Thomas Lusty	Great Britain	1:43.54	QS
4	Preslav Simeonov	Bulgaria	1:45.00	QS
5	Rodion Tuigunov	Kyrgyzstan	1:46.75	
6	Peng Yu-sheng	Chinese Taipei	1:50.17	
7	Fernandes Ngunza	Angola	1:55.64	

=== Semifinals ===
The fastest three boats in each semi advanced to the A final. The next three fastest boats in each semi advanced to the final B.The rest boats advanced to the C final

==== Semifinal 1 ====
Rank	Canoeist	Country	Time	Notes
1	Ádám Varga	Hungary	1:37.99	FA
2	Tom Liebscher	Germany	1:38.49	FA
3	Zhang Dong	China	1:38.91	FA
4	Gunnar Nydal Eide	Norway	1:39.38	FB
5	Branko Lagundžić	Serbia	1:40.58	FB
6	Timon Maurer	Austria	1:40.67	FB
7	Oleh Kukharyk	Ukraine	1:41.22	FC
8	Shakhriyor Makhkamov	Uzbekistan	1:41.62	FC
9	Erik Andersson	Sweden	1:43.01	FC

==== Semifinal 2 ====
Rank	Canoeist	Country	Time	Notes
1	Maxim Spesivtsev	Individual Neutral Athletes	1:37.33	FA
2	Thorbjørn Rask	Denmark	1:37.99	FA
3	Josef Dostál	Czech Republic	1:38.51	FA
4	Piotr Morawski	Poland	1:39.36	FB
5	Guillaume Keller	France	1:40.20	FB
6	Taishi Tanada	Japan	1:40.37	FB
7	Ali Aghamirzaei	Iran	1:40.41	FC
8	Augustus Cook	United States	1:40.42	FC
9	Thomas Lusty	Great Britain	1:41.51	FC

==== Semifinal 3 ====
Rank	Canoeist	Country	Time	Notes
1	Alex Graneri	Spain	1:38.41	FA
2	Matías Otero	Uruguay	1:38.89	FA
3	Fernando Pimenta	Portugal	1:39.20	FA
4	Denis Myšák	Slovakia	1:39.40	FB
5	Dzianis Yermolenka	Individual Neutral Athletes	1:39.97	FB
6	Giacomo Cinti	Italy	1:40.90	FB
7	Simonas Maldonis	Lithuania	1:42.96	FC
8	Nicholas Matveev	Canada	1:42.98	FC
9	Preslav Simeonov	Bulgaria	1:44.96	FC

=== Finals ===
==== Final C ====
Competitors in this final raced for positions 19 to 27.

Rank	Canoeist	Country	Time	Notes
1	Oleh Kukharyk	Ukraine	1:44.18	
2	Erik Andersson	Sweden	1:44.51	
3	Simonas Maldonis	Lithuania	1:44.98	
4	Thomas Lusty	Great Britain	1:45.09	
5	Augustus Cook	United States	1:45.15	
6	Shakhriyor Makhkamov	Uzbekistan	1:45.50	
7	Ali Aghamirzaei	Iran	1:45.62	
8	Preslav Simeonov	Bulgaria	1:47.81	
9	Nicholas Matveev	Canada	1:54.09	

==== Final B ====
Competitors in this final raced for positions 10 to 18.

Rank	Canoeist	Country	Time	Notes
1	Gunnar Nydal Eide	Norway	1:43.30	
2	Branko Lagundžić	Serbia	1:43.86	
3	Denis Myšák	Slovakia	1:44.41	
4	Piotr Morawski	Poland	1:44.54	
5	Timon Maurer	Austria	1:44.86	
6	Giacomo Cinti	Italy	1:44.95	
7	Guillaume Keller	France	1:45.23	
8	Dzianis Yermolenka	Individual Neutral Athletes	1:45.40	
9	Taishi Tanada	Japan	1:46.54	

==== Final A ====
Competitors raced for positions 1 to 9, with medals going to the top three.

Rank	Canoeist	Country	Time	Notes
1st place, gold medalist(s)	Josef Dostál	Czech Republic	1:38.43	
2nd place, silver medalist(s)	Ádám Varga	Hungary	1:38.52	
3rd place, bronze medalist(s)	Alex Graneri	Spain	1:39.05	
4	Fernando Pimenta	Portugal	1:39.71	
5	Tom Liebscher	Germany	1:39.93	
6	Thorbjørn Rask	Denmark	1:40.13	
7	Maxim Spesivtsev	Individual Neutral Athletes	1:40.51	
8	Zhang Dong	China	1:40.85	
9	Matías Otero	Uruguay	1:42.32	
