= Canoeing at the 2016 Summer Olympics – Men's K-1 1000 metres =

Men's canoe sprint K-1 1,000 metres at the Games of the XXXI Olympiad
- Venue: Lagoa Stadium
- Date: 15–16 August 2016
- Competitors: 21 from 21 nations
- Winning time: 3:31.447

Medalists
1st place, gold medalist(s)		Marcus Walz	Spain
2nd place, silver medalist(s)		Josef Dostál	Czech Republic
3rd place, bronze medalist(s)		Roman Anoshkin	Russia

The men's canoe sprint K-1 1,000 metres at the 2016 Olympic Games in Rio de Janeiro took place between 15 and 16 August at Lagoa Stadium. The medals were presented by Crown Prince Frederik of Denmark, IOC member, Denmark and Jorn Cronberg, board member of the ICF.

== Competition format ==
The competition comprised heats, semifinals, and a final round. The top five boats from each heat, and the fastest loser, advanced to the semifinals. The top four boats in each semifinal advanced to the "A" final, and competed for medals. A placing "B" final was held for the other semifinalists.

== Schedule ==
All times are Brasília Time (UTC−03:00)

Date	Time	Round
Monday 15 August 2016	09:06; 10:21	Heats; Semifinals
Tuesday 16 August 2016	09:04	Finals

== Results ==
=== Heats ===
First five and the best 6th placed boat are qualified for the semifinals.

==== Heat 1 ====
Rank	Canoer	Country	Time	Notes
1	René Holten Poulsen	Denmark	3:35.722	SF
2	Peter Gelle	Slovakia	3:36.342	SF
3	Adam van Koeverden	Canada	3:37.212	SF
4	Rafał Rosolski	Poland	3:37.700	SF
5	Balint Kopasz	Hungary	3:38.011	SF
6	Miroslav Kirchev	Bulgaria	3:39.363	
7	Fabio Wyss	Switzerland	3:41.985	

==== Heat 2 ====
Rank	Canoer	Country	Time	Notes
1	Josef Dostál	Czech Republic	3:35.342	SF
2	Murray Stewart	Australia	3:36.210	SF
3	Cyrille Carré	France	3:36.322	SF
4	Dejan Pajic	Serbia	3:36.884	SF
5	Roman Anoshkin	Russia	3:37.296	SF
6	Alberto Ricchetti	Italy	3:37.610	
7	Ilya Golendov	Kazakhstan	3:37.953	

==== Heat 3 ====
Rank	Canoer	Country	Time	Notes
1	Fernando Pimenta	Portugal	3:33.140	SF
2	Max Hoff	Germany	3:33.585	SF
3	Marcus Walz	Spain	3:33.786	SF
4	Aleksey Mochalov	Uzbekistan	3:34.469	SF
5	Artuur Peters	Belgium	3:34.781	SF
6	Mohamed Ali Mrabet	Tunisia	3:35.084	SF
7	Marty McDowell	New Zealand	3:39.588	

=== Semifinals ===
The fastest four canoeists in each semifinal qualify for the 'A' final. The slowest four canoeists in each semifinal qualify for the 'B' final.

==== Semifinal 1 ====
Rank	Canoer	Country	Time	Notes
1	Murray Stewart	Australia	3:32.602	FA
2	Fernando Pimenta	Portugal	3:33.420	FA
3	Marcus Walz	Spain	3:33.781	FA
4	René Holten Poulsen	Denmark	3:34.344	FA
5	Balint Kopasz	Hungary	3:34.772	FB
6	Adam van Koeverden	Canada	3:36.230	FB
7	Artuur Peters	Belgium	3:37.586	FB
8	Dejan Pajić	Serbia	3:48.158	FB

==== Semifinal 2 ====
Rank	Canoer	Country	Time	Notes
1	Roman Anoshkin	Russia	3:34.833	FA
2	Max Hoff	Germany	3:36.136	FA
3	Peter Gelle	Slovakia	3:36.193	FA
4	Josef Dostál	Czech Republic	3:36.384	FA
5	Aleksey Mochalov	Uzbekistan	3:36.968	FB
6	Cyrille Carré	France	3:38.115	FB
7	Rafał Rosolski	Poland	3:38.379	FB
8	Mohamed Mrabet	Tunisia	3:43.145	FB

=== Finals ===
==== Final B ====
Rank	Canoer	Country	Time
1	Adam van Koeverden	Canada	3:31.872
2	Bálint Kopasz	Hungary	3:32.392
3	Artuur Peters	Belgium	3:33.521
4	Aleksey Mochalov	Uzbekistan	3:34.807
5	Cyrille Carré	France	3:36.606
6	Rafał Rosolski	Poland	3:39.021
7	Dejan Pajić	Serbia	3:40.502
8	Mohamed Mrabet	Tunisia	3:45.122

==== Final A ====
Rank	Canoer	Country	Time
1st place, gold medalist(s)	Marcus Walz	Spain	3:31.447
2nd place, silver medalist(s)	Josef Dostál	Czech Republic	3:32.145
3rd place, bronze medalist(s)	Roman Anoshkin	Russia	3:33.363
4	Murray Stewart	Australia	3:33.741
5	Fernando Pimenta	Portugal	3:35.349
6	René Holten Poulsen	Denmark	3:36.840
7	Max Hoff	Germany	3:37.581
8	Peter Gelle	Slovakia	3:40.691
