= 2019 ICF Canoe Sprint World Championships – Men's K-1 500 metres =

Men's K-1 500 metres at the 2019 ICF Canoe Sprint World Championships
- Venue: Olympic Centre of Szeged
- Location: Szeged, Hungary
- Dates: 21–23 August
- Competitors: 45 from 45 nations
- Winning time: 1:35.04 WB

Medalists
| gold medal | Tom Liebscher | Germany |
| silver medal | Mikita Borykau | Belarus |
| bronze medal | Maxim Spesivtsev | Russia |

The men's K-1 500 metres competition at the 2019 ICF Canoe Sprint World Championships in Szeged took place at the Olympic Centre of Szeged.

== Schedule ==
The schedule was as follows:

| Date | Time | Round |
|---|---|---|
| Wednesday 21 August 2019 | 10:43 | Heats |
| Thursday 22 August 2019 | 15:24 | Semifinals |
| Friday 23 August 2019 | 14:41 | Final C |
| Friday 23 August 2019 | 14:47 | Final B |
| Friday 23 August 2019 | 15:31 | Final A |

All times are Central European Summer Time (UTC+2)

== Results ==
=== Heats ===
The four fastest boats in each heat, plus the three fastest fifth-place boats advanced to the semifinals.

==== Heat 1 ====
| Rank | Kayaker | Country | Time | Notes |
|---|---|---|---|---|
| 1 | Tom Liebscher | Germany | 1:38.51 | QS |
| 2 | Pelayo Roza | Spain | 1:40.11 | QS |
| 3 | Jan Štěrba | Czech Republic | 1:41.21 | QS |
| 4 | Ivan Lukyanov | Kazakhstan | 1:44.18 | QS |
| 5 | Kristaps Laube | Latvia | 1:45.52 | qS |
| 6 | Atul Kumar | India | 1:51.30 | |
| 7 | Abdelmajid Jabbour | Morocco | 1:56.02 | |
| – | Sulaiman A. S. Al-Sammarraie | Iraq | DNS | |
| – | Amado Cruz | Belize | DNS | |

==== Heat 2 ====
| Rank | Kayaker | Country | Time | Notes |
|---|---|---|---|---|
| 1 | Maxim Spesivtsev | Russia | 1:40.71 | QS |
| 2 | Daniel Johnson | Great Britain | 1:42.09 | QS |
| 3 | Antun Novaković | Croatia | 1:42.61 | QS |
| 4 | Franck Le Moël | France | 1:44.49 | QS |
| 5 | Abdusattor Gafurov | Tajikistan | 1:51.57 | |
| 6 | Fernando Pimenta | Portugal | 2:05.53 | |
| – | Saphan Swaleh | Pakistan | DNS | |

==== Heat 3 ====
| Rank | Kayaker | Country | Time | Notes |
|---|---|---|---|---|
| 1 | Przemysław Korsak | Poland | 1:42.86 | QS |
| 2 | Bram Brandjes | Netherlands | 1:43.91 | QS |
| 3 | Omar de Andrés | Argentina | 1:45.49 | QS |
| 4 | Jesse Lishchuk | United States | 1:50.49 | QS |
| 5 | Joaquim Manhique | Mozambique | 2:00.28 | |
| 6 | Jimmy Jonas | Palau | 2:30.67 | |
| – | Nikola Maleski | North Macedonia | DSQ | |
| – | Cristian Canache | Venezuela | DNS | |

==== Heat 4 ====
| Rank | Kayaker | Country | Time | Notes |
|---|---|---|---|---|
| 1 | Bence Dombvári | Hungary | 1:39.48 | QS |
| 2 | Ervin Holpert | Serbia | 1:40.83 | QS |
| 3 | Mikita Borykau | Belarus | 1:41.90 | QS |
| 4 | Matteo Torneo | Italy | 1:42.18 | QS |
| 5 | Lin Yung-chieh | Chinese Taipei | 1:44.26 | qS |
| 6 | Ahmed Elbedwihy | Egypt | 1:52.77 | |
| 7 | Bram Sanderson | Dominica | 2:48.85 | |

==== Heat 5 ====
| Rank | Kayaker | Country | Time | Notes |
|---|---|---|---|---|
| 1 | Wang Chi | China | 1:41.79 | QS |
| 2 | Barry Watkins | Ireland | 1:41.85 | QS |
| 3 | Ilya Podpolnyy | Israel | 1:43.50 | QS |
| 4 | Brandon Wei Cheng Ooi | Singapore | 1:44.27 | QS |
| 5 | Amin Boudaghi | Iran | 1:47.47 | qS |
| 6 | Serghei Vihrov | Moldova | 1:51.91 | |
| 7 | Kwok Ka-wai | Hong Kong | 1:56.37 | |

==== Heat 6 ====
| Rank | Kayaker | Country | Time | Notes |
|---|---|---|---|---|
| 1 | Thomas Green | Australia | 1:39.64 | QS |
| 2 | Oleh Kukharyk | Ukraine | 1:40.20 | QS |
| 3 | David Johansson | Sweden | 1:44.85 | QS |
| 4 | Ioannis Odysseos | Cyprus | 1:46.73 | QS |
| 5 | Rodion Tuigunov | Kyrgyzstan | 1:50.19 | |
| 6 | Khairul Naim Zainal | Malaysia | 1:56.97 | |
| 7 | Nicholas Robinson | Trinidad and Tobago | 2:01.38 | |

=== Semifinals ===
Qualification in each semi was as follows:

The fastest three boats advanced to the A final.
The next three fastest boats advanced to the B final.
The seventh, eighth and ninth-place boats advanced to the C final.

==== Semifinal 1 ====
| Rank | Kayaker | Country | Time | Notes |
|---|---|---|---|---|
| 1 | Bence Dombvári | Hungary | 1:36.41 | QA |
| 2 | Tom Liebscher | Germany | 1:36.65 | QA |
| 3 | Oleh Kukharyk | Ukraine | 1:36.86 | QA |
| 4 | Antun Novaković | Croatia | 1:39.47 | QB |
| 5 | Lin Yung-chieh | Chinese Taipei | 1:40.17 | QB |
| 6 | Ilya Podpolnyy | Israel | 1:40.46 | QB |
| 7 | Ivan Lukyanov | Kazakhstan | 1:40.63 | QC |
| 8 | Matteo Torneo | Italy | 1:40.94 | QC |
| 9 | Bram Brandjes | Netherlands | 1:41.41 | QC |

==== Semifinal 2 ====
| Rank | Kayaker | Country | Time | Notes |
|---|---|---|---|---|
| 1 | Pelayo Roza | Spain | 1:37.87 | QA |
| 2 | Maxim Spesivtsev | Russia | 1:37.87 | QA |
| 3 | Ervin Holpert | Serbia | 1:38.29 | QA |
| 4 | Franck Le Moël | France | 1:39.83 | QB |
| 5 | Wang Chi | China | 1:40.10 | QB |
| 6 | Kristaps Laube | Latvia | 1:42.19 | QB |
| 7 | Brandon Wei Cheng Ooi | Singapore | 1:42.40 | QC |
| 8 | Omar de Andrés | Argentina | 1:44.33 | QC |
| 9 | David Johansson | Sweden | 1:57.68 | QC |

==== Semifinal 3 ====
| Rank | Kayaker | Country | Time | Notes |
|---|---|---|---|---|
| 1 | Thomas Green | Australia | 1:35.86 | QA |
| 2 | Mikita Borykau | Belarus | 1:36.04 | QA |
| 3 | Przemysław Korsak | Poland | 1:37.83 | QA |
| 4 | Jan Štěrba | Czech Republic | 1:39.02 | QB |
| 5 | Daniel Johnson | Great Britain | 1:39.08 | QB |
| 6 | Barry Watkins | Ireland | 1:40.38 | QB |
| 7 | Amin Boudaghi | Iran | 1:43.94 | QC |
| 8 | Jesse Lishchuk | United States | 1:43.98 | QC |
| 9 | Ioannis Odysseos | Cyprus | 1:45.02 | QC |

=== Finals ===
==== Final C ====
Competitors in this final raced for positions 19 to 27.

| Rank | Kayaker | Country | Time |
|---|---|---|---|
| 1 | Ivan Lukyanov | Kazakhstan | 1:38.99 |
| 2 | David Johansson | Sweden | 1:39.54 |
| 3 | Matteo Torneo | Italy | 1:39.97 |
| 4 | Bram Brandjes | Netherlands | 1:40.24 |
| 5 | Brandon Wei Cheng Ooi | Singapore | 1:41.45 |
| 6 | Omar de Andrés | Argentina | 1:41.88 |
| 7 | Jesse Lishchuk | United States | 1:42.86 |
| 8 | Amin Boudaghi | Iran | 1:44.25 |
| 9 | Ioannis Odysseos | Cyprus | 1:50.23 |

==== Final B ====
Competitors in this final raced for positions 10 to 18.

| Rank | Kayaker | Country | Time |
|---|---|---|---|
| 1 | Ilya Podpolnyy | Israel | 1:38.88 |
| 2 | Antun Novaković | Croatia | 1:39.20 |
| 3 | Wang Chi | China | 1:39.43 |
| 4 | Jan Štěrba | Czech Republic | 1:39.51 |
| 5 | Daniel Johnson | Great Britain | 1:39.77 |
| 6 | Barry Watkins | Ireland | 1:40.25 |
| 7 | Franck Le Moël | France | 1:40.88 |
| 8 | Lin Yung-chieh | Chinese Taipei | 1:41.61 |
| 9 | Kristaps Laube | Latvia | 1:41.98 |

==== Final A ====
Competitors in this final raced for positions 1 to 9, with medals going to the top three.

| Rank | Kayaker | Country | Time | Notes |
|---|---|---|---|---|
| 1st place, gold medalist(s) | Tom Liebscher | Germany | 1:35.04 | WB |
| 2nd place, silver medalist(s) | Mikita Borykau | Belarus | 1:35.19 | |
| 3rd place, bronze medalist(s) | Maxim Spesivtsev | Russia | 1:35.49 | |
| 4 | Thomas Green | Australia | 1:35.85 | |
| 5 | Bence Dombvári | Hungary | 1:36.41 | |
| 6 | Ervin Holpert | Serbia | 1:37.00 | |
| 7 | Pelayo Roza | Spain | 1:37.01 | |
| 8 | Oleh Kukharyk | Ukraine | 1:37.62 | |
| 9 | Przemysław Korsak | Poland | 1:38.00 | |
