= Ádám Varga (canoeist) =

Hungarian canoeist

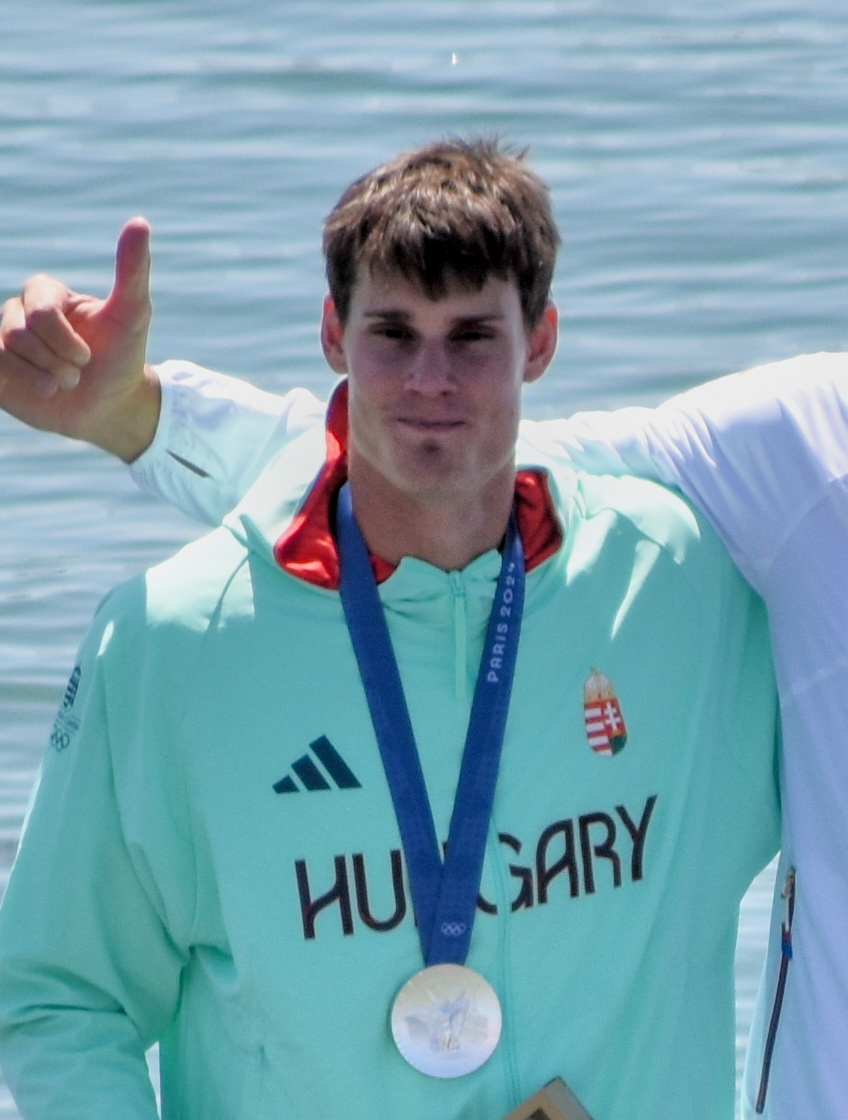
- Varga in 2024

Personal information
- Born: 20 November 1999 (age 26) Budapest, Hungary
- Height: 1.94 m (6 ft 4 in)

Sport
- Country: Hungary
- Sport: Canoe sprint, Sprint kayak
- Event: K-1 1000 m
Medal record
Men's canoe sprint
Representing Hungary
Olympic Games
Silver medal – second place	2020 Tokyo	K-1 1000 m
Silver medal – second place	2024 Paris	K-1 1000 m
World Championships
Silver medal – second place	2023 Duisburg	K-1 1000 m
Silver medal – second place	2025 Milan	K-1 500 m
Silver medal – second place	2026 Poznań	K-1 500 m
Bronze medal – third place	2025 Milan	K-1 5000 m
European Games
Gold medal – first place	2023 Kraków-Małopolska	K-1 500 m
European Championships
Gold medal – first place	2024 Szeged	K-1 500 m
Gold medal – first place	2025 Račice	K-1 500 m
Silver medal – second place	2022 Munich	K-1 500 m
Silver medal – second place	2024 Szeged	K-1 5000 m
Silver medal – second place	2025 Racice	K-1 5000 m

Ádám Varga (born 20 November 1999) is a Hungarian canoeist. He competed in the men's K-1 1000 metres event at the 2020 Summer Olympics.
