= Moritz Florstedt =

German canoeist (born 2001)

Personal information
- Full name: Moritz Willi Florstedt
- Nationality: German
- Born: 8 October 2001 (age 24) Magdeburg, Germany
- Height: 1.79 m (5 ft 10 in)
- Weight: 107 kg (236 lb)

Sport
- Country: Germany
- Sport: Sprint kayak
- Club: SC Magdeburg
Medal record
Men's canoe sprint
Representing Germany
World Championships
| Bronze medal – third place | 2021 Copenhagen | K-1 500 m |
European Championships
| Silver medal – second place | 2022 Munich | K-2 500 m |

Moritz Willi Florstedt (born 8 October 2001) is a German sprint canoeist.

He competed at the 2021 ICF Canoe Sprint World Championships, winning a bronze medal in the K-1 500 m distance.
