= Uladzislau Kravets =

Belarusian sprint canoeist

Personal information
- Native name: Уладзіслаў Вітальевіч Кравець
- Nationality: Belarus
- Born: 6 July 1999 (age 27)

Sport
- Sport: Sprint kayak
Medal record
Men's canoe sprint
Representing ANA
World Championships
Gold medal – first place	2024 Samarkand	K-4 Mix 500 m
Bronze medal – third place	2024 Samarkand	K-1 500 m
European Championships
Silver medal – second place	2024 Szeged	K-2 500 m
Gold medal – first place	2024 Szeged	K-4 500 m
Gold medal – first place	2024 Szeged	K-4 1000 m
Gold medal – first place	2026 Montemor o velho	K-1 1000 m

Uladzislau Vitalevich Kravets (Belarusian: Уладзіслаў Вітальевіч Кравець; born 6 July 1999) is a Belarusian sprint canoeist. He competed at the 2024 ICF Canoe Sprint World Championships, winning the bronze medal in the men's k-1 500 metres event.

At the 2024 Summer Olympics, he competed in the men's k-1 1000 metres event, finishing in fourth place.

== Major results ==
=== Olympic Games ===
Year	K-1 1000
2024	4

=== World championships ===
Year	K-1 500	K-1 1000	XK-4 500
2024	3rd place, bronze medalist(s)	—N/a	1st place, gold medalist(s)
2025		7	—N/a
2026	5	4	—N/a
