= Mikita Borykau =

Belarusian sprint canoeist (born 1992)

Personal information
- Full name: Mikita Alyaksandravich Borykau
- Nationality: Belarusian
- Born: 7 July 1992 (age 34) Rahachow, Belarus
- Height: 1.91 m (6 ft 3 in)

Sport
- Country: Belarus
- Sport: Sprint kayak
Medal record
Men's sprint kayak
Representing Belarus
World Championships
Gold medal – first place	2021 Copenhagen	K-1 500 m
Silver medal – second place	2019 Szeged	K-1 500 m
European Championships
Silver medal – second place	2017 Plovdiv	K-1 500 m
Bronze medal – third place	2017 Plovdiv	K-4 500 m
Representing ANA
World Championships
Gold medal – first place	2024 Samarkand	K-2 1000 m
European Championships
Gold medal – first place	2024 Szeged	K-4 500 m
Gold medal – first place	2024 Szeged	K-4 1000 m

Mikita Alyaksandravich Borykau (Belarusian: Мікіта Аляксандравіч Борыкаў; born 7 July 1992) is a Belarusian sprint canoeist.

He became World Champion at the 2021 ICF Canoe Sprint World Championships.

== Major results ==
=== Olympic Games ===
Year	K-2 1000	K-4 500
2020	7	5

=== World championships ===
Year	K-1 500	K-2 1000	K-4 500	K-4 1000
2017			8	
2018	9			5
2019	2nd place, silver medalist(s)	1 FC		
2021	1st place, gold medalist(s)		4	—N/a
2024		1st place, gold medalist(s)	—N/a	—N/a
