= Lars Magne Ullvang =

Norwegian canoeist

Personal information
- Nationality: Norwegian
- Born: 1 August 1994 (age 31) Haugesund, Norway
- Height: 190 cm (6 ft 3 in)

Sport
- Sport: Sprint kayak
- Club: Tysvær Kano- og Kajakklubb

Lars Magne Ullvang (born 1 August 1994) is a Norwegian canoeist, born in Haugesund. He qualified to represent Norway at the 2020 Summer Olympics in Tokyo 2021, competing in men's K-1 1000 metres.

Ullvang has won several national titles, and was awarded the King's Cup trophy in 2014, 2017, 2018, 2019, and 2020.
