= Maxim Spesivtsev =

Russian sprint canoeist (born 1994)

Personal information
- Full name: Maxim Sergeyevich Spesivtsev
- Nationality: (Russia) Russian
- Born: 8 April 1994 (age 32)

Sport
- Country: Russia
- Sport: Sprint kayak
- Event: K–1 500 m
- Coached by: A. A. Tishchenko; O. V. Kozeyev; A. P. Tishchenko; T. L. Tishchenko
Medal record
Men's canoe sprint
Representing Russia
World Championships
Bronze medal – third place	2019 Szeged	K-1 500 m
European Championships
Bronze medal – third place	2021 Poznań	K-4 500 m
Bronze medal – third place	2021 Poznań	K-4 1000 m
Universiade
Gold medal – first place	2013 Kazan	K-4 1000 m

Maxim Sergeyevich Spesivtsev (Russian: Максим Сергеевич Спесивцев; born 8 April 1994) is a Russian sprint canoeist.

He won a medal at the 2019 ICF Canoe Sprint World Championships.
