= Josef Dostál (canoeist) =

Czech canoeist (born 1993)

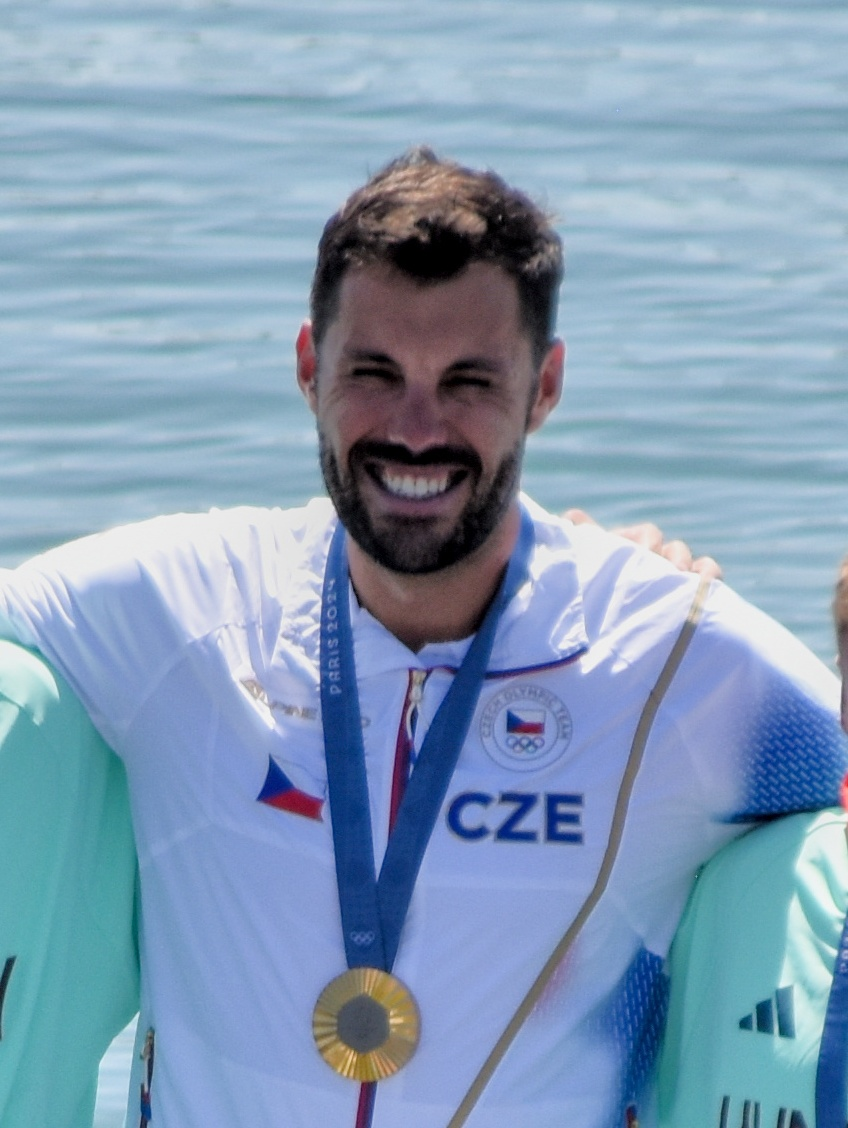
- Dostál in 2024

Personal information
- Nickname: Pepa
- Nationality: Czech
- Born: 3 March 1993 (age 33) Prague, Czech Republic
- Height: 2.02 m (6 ft 8 in)
- Weight: 112 kg (247 lb)

Sport
- Country: Czech Republic
- Sport: Sprint kayak
- Events: K-1 500 m, K-1 1000 m, K-4 1000 m
- Club: ASC Dukla
- Coached by: Pavel Davidek, Karel Leština
Medal record
Men's canoe sprint
Representing Czech Republic
Olympic Games
Gold medal – first place	2024 Paris	K-1 1000 m
Silver medal – second place	2016 Rio de Janeiro	K-1 1000 m
Bronze medal – third place	2012 London	K-4 1000 m
Bronze medal – third place	2016 Rio de Janeiro	K-4 1000 m
Bronze medal – third place	2020 Tokyo	K-2 1000 m
World Championships
Gold medal – first place	2014 Moscow	K-1 1000 m
Gold medal – first place	2014 Moscow	K-4 1000 m
Gold medal – first place	2017 Račice	K-1 500 m
Gold medal – first place	2018 Montemor-o-Velho	K-1 500 m
Gold medal – first place	2022 Dartmouth	K-1 500 m
Gold medal – first place	2024 Samarkand	K-1 500 m
Gold medal – first place	2025 Milan	K-1 500 m
Silver medal – second place	2013 Duisburg	K-4 1000 m
Silver medal – second place	2015 Milan	K–1 1000 m
Silver medal – second place	2019 Szeged	K-1 1000 m
Bronze medal – third place	2015 Milan	K-4 1000 m
Bronze medal – third place	2017 Račice	K-1 1000 m
Bronze medal – third place	2018 Montemor-o-Velho	K-1 1000 m
Bronze medal – third place	2024 Samarkand	K-2 Mix 500 m
European Championships
Gold medal – first place	2013 Montemor-o-Velho	K-4 1000 m
Gold medal – first place	2014 Brandenburg	K-4 1000 m
Gold medal – first place	2015 Račice	K-4 1000 m
Gold medal – first place	2018 Belgrade	K-1 500 m
Silver medal – second place	2012 Zagreb	K-1 500 m
Silver medal – second place	2026 Montemor-o-Velho	K-1 500 m
Bronze medal – third place	2013 Montemor-o-Velho	K-1 1000 m
Bronze medal – third place	2025 Racice	K-1 500 m
Under-23 World Championships
Gold medal – first place	2013 Niagara	K-1 1000 m

Josef Dostál (Czech pronunciation: [ˈjozɛv ˈdostaːl]; born 3 March 1993) is a Czech sprint canoeist.

== Career ==
He won a bronze medal at the 2012 Summer Olympics in the K-4 1000 m event.

He won the silver medal in the K-1 1000 metres event at the 2016 Summer Olympics in Rio de Janeiro. He was also part of the Czech team that won bronze in the K-4 1000 metres event at the 2016 Summer Olympics. He was the flag bearer for the Czech Republic during the closing ceremony.

Dostál won a gold medal at the 2024 Summer Olympics in the K-1 1000 m event. Afterwards, he was named Czech Sportsperson of the Year 2024.

== Major results ==
=== Olympics ===
Year	K-1 1000	K-2 1000	K-4 1000
2012			3rd place, bronze medalist(s)
2016	2nd place, silver medalist(s)		3rd place, bronze medalist(s)
2020	5	3rd place, bronze medalist(s)	—N/a
2024	1st place, gold medalist(s)	—N/a	—N/a

=== World championships ===
Year	K-1 500	K-1 1000	K-2 1000	K-4 500	K-4 1000	XK-2 500
2013				—N/a	2nd place, silver medalist(s)	—N/a
2014		1st place, gold medalist(s)		—N/a	1st place, gold medalist(s)	—N/a
2015		2nd place, silver medalist(s)		—N/a	3rd place, bronze medalist(s)	—N/a
2017	1st place, gold medalist(s)	3rd place, bronze medalist(s)				—N/a
2018	1st place, gold medalist(s)	3rd place, bronze medalist(s)		8		—N/a
2019		2nd place, silver medalist(s)	4			—N/a
2022	1st place, gold medalist(s)	5			—N/a	
2023	4	5			—N/a	
2024	1st place, gold medalist(s)	—N/a		—N/a	—N/a	3rd place, bronze medalist(s)
2025	1st place, gold medalist(s)	4			—N/a	—N/a

== Awards and recognition ==
- Medal of Merit (2025)

Awards
Preceded by Markéta Vondroušová	Czech Athlete of the Year; 2024	Succeeded by TBD
