= Bojan Zdelar =

Serbian canoeist

Personal information
- Nationality: Serbia
- Born: 11 April 2000 (age 26) Sremska Mitrovica, FR Yugoslavia
- Height: 1.89 m (6 ft 2 in)
- Weight: 95 kg (209 lb)

Sport
- Sport: Canoe racing
- Club: "Val" Sremska Mitrovica
Medal record
Men's canoe sprint
Representing Serbia
World U23 Championships
Gold medal – first place	2021 Montemor-o-Velho	K-1 500 m
Bronze medal – third place	2022 Szeged	K-1 1000 m
Bronze medal – third place	2022 Szeged	K-1 500 m
European U23 Championships
Gold medal – first place	2019 Racice	K-1 1000 m
Silver medal – second place	2019 Racice	K-1 500 m
World Junior Championships
Silver medal – second place	2017 Pitesti	K-1 500 m
Bronze medal – third place	2018 Plovdiv	K-1 500 m
European Junior Championships
Silver medal – second place	2018 Auronzo di Cadore	K-1 500 m
Bronze medal – third place	2016 Plovdiv	K-1 500 m
Bronze medal – third place	2017 Belgrade	K-1 1000 m
Bronze medal – third place	2017 Belgrade	K-1 500 m

Bojan Zdelar (Serbian Cyrillic: Бојан Зделар; born 11 April 2000) is a Serbian sprint canoeist.

His most recent victory is the men's K-1 500 meters kayak single in the Canoe Sprint World U23 Championships in 2021.

At the 2020 Summer Olympics, he competed in the men's K-1 1000 metres and 200 metres.

He finished 4th in the K-1 500 metres event at the 2021 Canoe Sprint World Championships.
