= Mohamed Mrabet (canoeist) =

Tunisian canoeist (born 1990)

Personal information
- Born: 1 January 1990 (age 36) Doha, Qatar
- Height: 182 cm (6 ft 0 in)
- Weight: 84 kg (185 lb)

Sport
- Sport: Canoe sprint

Mohamed Mrabet (born 1 January 1990) is a Tunisian sprint canoeist. At the 2012 Summer Olympics, he competed in the men's K-1 200 metres and 1000 metres. At the 2016 Olympics, he competed in the men's K-1 1000 metres. At the 2020 Summer Olympics, he competed in the men's K-1 1000 metres.
