= Roman Anoshkin =

Russian canoeist (born 1987)

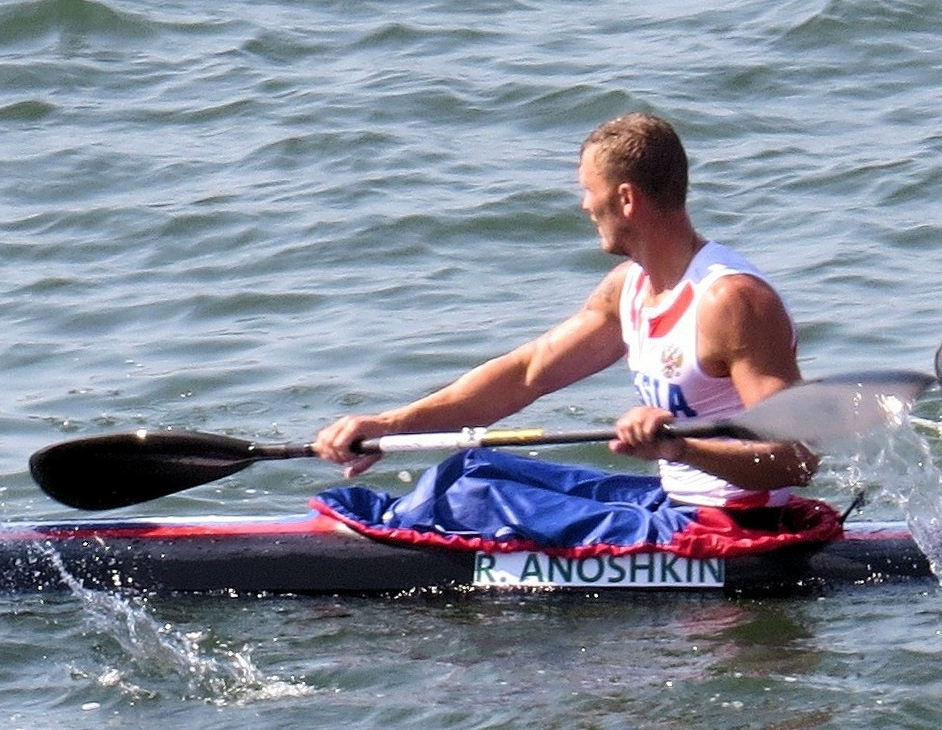
- Anoshkin at the 2016 Olympics

Personal information
- Nationality: Russian
- Born: 31 August 1987 (age 38) Pushkino, Moscow Oblast, Russian SFSR, Soviet Union
- Education: Moscow State Academy of Physical Education
- Height: 1.92 m (6 ft 4 in)
- Weight: 95 kg (209 lb)

Sport
- Country: Russia
- Sport: Canoe
- Event: Canoe sprint
- Club: CSKA
- Coached by: Alexander Shishkin
Medal record
Representing Russia
Olympic Games
Bronze medal – third place	2016 Rio de Janeiro	K-1 1000 m
World Championships
Bronze medal – third place	2015 Milan	K-1 500 m
European Games
Bronze medal – third place	2019 Minsk	K-2 1000 m
European Championships
Silver medal – second place	2016 Moscow	K-4 1000 m

Roman Sergeyevich Anoshkin (Russian: Роман Сергеевич Аношкин; born 31 August 1987) is a Russian sprint canoeist. He won individual bronze medals at the 2015 World Championships and 2016 Rio Olympics. He also won a silver medal in the four-man K-4 1000 m event at the 2016 European Championships and placed ninth at the 2016 Olympics. Following this, he competed in the 2020 Olympics.
