= Étienne Hubert (canoeist) =

French canoeist (born 1988)

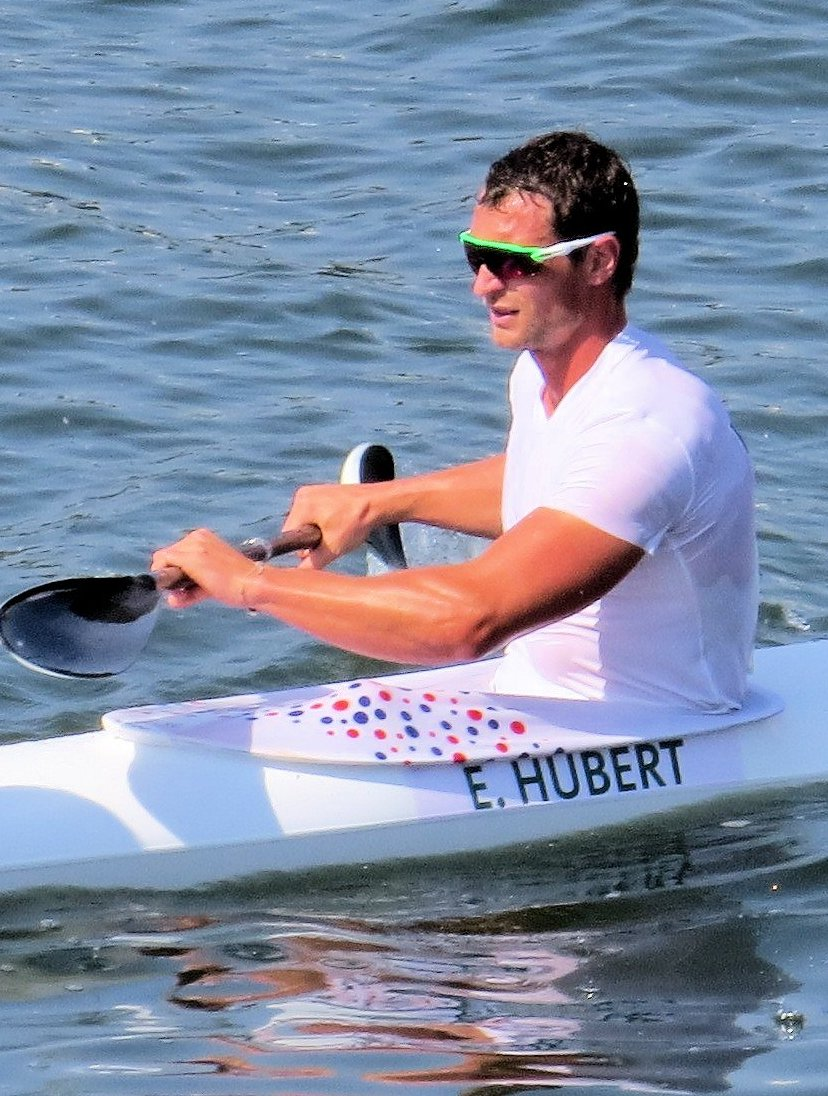
- Hubert at the 2016 Summer Olympics

Personal information
- Nationality: French
- Born: 27 January 1988 (age 38) Sedan, France
- Height: 1.85 m (6 ft 1 in)
- Weight: 86 kg (190 lb)

Sport
- Country: France
- Sport: Sprint kayak
- Events: K–2 1000 m, K-4 1000 m
- Club: Canoe Kayak du Pays Sedanais
Medal record
Men's canoe sprint
Representing France
World Championships
Gold medal – first place	2010 Poznań	K-4 1000 m
Silver medal – second place	2014 Moscow	K-1 4 × 200 m
Bronze medal – third place	2019 Szeged	K-2 1000 m
European Championships
Silver medal – second place	2014 Brandenburg	K-2 1000 m
Bronze medal – third place	2024 Szeged	K-2 1000 m

Étienne Hubert (born 27 January 1988) is a French sprint canoeist.

== Career ==
Hubert has competed since the late 2000s. He won a gold medal in the K-4 1000 m event at the 2010 ICF Canoe Sprint World Championships in Poznań.
