= Peter Gelle =

Slovak canoeist

Medal record

Men's canoe sprint

Representing Slovakia

World Championships
Gold medal – first place	2011 Szeged	K-2 1000 m
Silver medal – second place	2010 Poznań	K-1 500 m
Silver medal – second place	2017 Račice	K-2 1000 m

European Championships
Silver medal – second place	2011 Belgrade	K-2 500 m
Bronze medal – third place	2012 Zagreb	K-2 1000 m

Peter Gelle (Hungarian: Gelle Péter; born 23 August 1984) is a Slovak sprint canoer who has competed since the late 2000s. He is a member of the Hungarian community in Slovakia.

He won a silver medal in the K-1 500 m at the 2010 ICF Canoe Sprint World Championships in Poznań and a gold medal in the K-2 1000 m in 2011 with Erik Vlček.

== Biography ==
Peter was born in Štúrovo and is a member of ethnic Hungarian community in Slovakia. The area was transferred to a newly formed Czechoslovakia following the Treaty of Trianon.
