= Canoe sprint at the 2015 European Games – Men's K-2 200 metres =

Men's K-2 200 metres at the 2015 European Games
- Venue: Kur Sport and Rowing Centre, Mingachevir
- Date: 15–16 June
- Competitors: 32 from 16 nations
- Winning time: 31.910

Medalists
gold medal	Nebojša Grujić; Marko Novaković	Serbia
silver medal	Ronald Rauhe; Tom Liebscher	Germany
bronze medal	Sándor Tótka; Péter Molnár	Hungary

The men's K-2 200 metres canoe sprint competition at the 2015 European Games in Baku took place between 15 and 16 June at the Kur Sport and Rowing Centre in Mingachevir.

== Schedule ==
The schedule was as follows:

Date	Time	Round
Monday 15 June 2015	14:25	Heats
Monday 15 June 2015	16:15	Semifinals
Tuesday 16 June 2015	15:35	Finals

All times are Azerbaijan Summer Time (UTC+5)

== Results ==
=== Heats ===
The fastest three boats in each heat advanced directly to the final. The next four fastest boats in each heat, plus the fastest remaining boat advanced to the semifinal.

==== Heat 1 ====
Rank	Kayakers	Country	Time	Notes
1	Ronald Rauhe; Tom Liebscher	Germany	31.645	QF, GB
2	Sándor Tótka; Péter Molnár	Hungary	31.776	QF
3	Yury Postrigay; Alexander Dyachenko	Russia	31.946	QF
4	Carlos Arévalo; Cristian Toro	Spain	32.319	QS
5	Ievgen Karabuta; Igor Trunov	Ukraine	32.569	QS*
6	Erik Svensson; Christian Svanqvist	Sweden	33.769	QS
7	Galin Georgiev; Nikolay Milev	Bulgaria	35.042	QS
8	Peter Egan; Simas Dobrovolskis	Ireland	35.049	

==== Heat 2 ====
Rank	Kayakers	Country	Time	Notes
1	Nebojša Grujić; Marko Novaković	Serbia	31.582	QF, GB
2	Liam Heath; Jon Schofield	Great Britain	31.606	QF
3	Manfredi Rizza; Matteo Florio	Italy	32.158	QF
4	Maxime Beaumont; Sébastien Jouve	France	32.224	QS
5	Dawid Putto; Paweł Kaczmarek	Poland	32.313	QS
6	Taras Valko; Vadzim Makhneu	Belarus	32.665	QS
7	Aurimas Lankas; Edvinas Ramanauskas	Lithuania	32.695	QS
8	Martin Jankovec; Ľubomír Beňo	Slovakia	33.448	qS

=== Semifinal ===
The fastest three boats advanced to the final.

Rank	Kayakers	Country	Time	Notes
1	Maxime Beaumont; Sébastien Jouve	France	31.530	QF, GB
2	Carlos Arévalo; Cristian Toro	Spain	31.633	QF
3	Taras Valko; Vadzim Makhneu	Belarus	31.786	QF
4	Erik Svensson; Christian Svanqvist	Sweden	31.905	
5	Dawid Putto; Paweł Kaczmarek	Poland	31.918	
6	Ievgen Karabuta; Igor Trunov	Ukraine	31.922	
7	Aurimas Lankas; Edvinas Ramanauskas	Lithuania	32.793	
8	Martin Jankovec; Ľubomír Beňo	Slovakia	33.144	
9	Galin Georgiev; Nikolay Milev	Bulgaria	34.050	

=== Final ===
Competitors in this final raced for positions 1 to 9, with medals going to the top three.

Rank	Kayakers	Country	Time
1st place, gold medalist(s)	Nebojša Grujić; Marko Novaković	Serbia	31.910
2nd place, silver medalist(s)	Ronald Rauhe; Tom Liebscher	Germany	31.983
3rd place, bronze medalist(s)	Sándor Tótka; Péter Molnár	Hungary	32.512
4	Carlos Arévalo; Cristian Toro	Spain	32.518
4	Liam Heath; Jon Schofield	Great Britain	32.518
6	Yury Postrigay; Alexander Dyachenko	Russia	32.627
7	Manfredi Rizza; Matteo Florio	Italy	32.738
8	Maxime Beaumont; Sébastien Jouve	France	32.768
9	Taras Valko; Vadzim Makhneu	Belarus	33.660
