= 2017 ICF Canoe Sprint World Championships – Men's K-2 200 metres =

Men's K-2 200 metres at the 2017 ICF Canoe Sprint World Championships
- Venue: Sportcentrum Račice
- Location: Račice, Czech Republic
- Dates: 24–26 August
- Competitors: 46 from 23 nations
- Winning time: 30.912

Medalists
| gold medal | Balázs Birkás; Márk Balaska | Hungary |
| silver medal | Cristian Toro; Carlos Garrote | Spain |
| bronze medal | Marko Novaković; Nebojša Grujić | Serbia |

The men's K-2 200 metres competition at the 2017 ICF Canoe Sprint World Championships in Račice took place at the Sportcentrum Račice.

== Schedule ==
The schedule was as follows:

| Date | Time | Round |
|---|---|---|
| Thursday 24 August 2017 | 10:27 | Heats |
| Thursday 24 August 2017 | 16:55 | Semifinals |
| Saturday 26 August 2017 | 09:49 | Final B |
| Saturday 26 August 2017 | 11:23 | Final A |

All times are Central European Summer Time (UTC+2)

== Results ==
=== Heats ===
Heat winners advanced directly to the A final. The next six fastest boats in each heat advanced to the semifinals.

==== Heat 1 ====
| Rank | Kayakers | Country | Time | Notes |
|---|---|---|---|---|
| 1 | Balázs Birkás; Márk Balaska | Hungary | 32.061 | QA |
| 2 | Michele Bertolini; Riccardo Maria Spotti | Italy | 32.445 | QS |
| 3 | Aurimas Lankas; Edvinas Ramanauskas | Lithuania | 32.695 | QS |
| 4 | Piotr Mazur; Paweł Kaczmarek | Poland | 33.400 | QS |
| 5 | Miroslav Zaťko; Ľubomír Beňo | Slovakia | 33.556 | QS |
| 6 | Joel Elenius; David Johansson | Sweden | 33.861 | QS |
| 7 | Aditep Srichart; Praison Buasamrong | Thailand | 34.856 | QS |
| 8 | Choi Min-kyu; Song Kuong-ho | South Korea | 35.350 | |

==== Heat 2 ====
| Rank | Kayakers | Country | Time | Notes |
|---|---|---|---|---|
| 1 | Cristian Toro; Carlos Garrote | Spain | 32.409 | QA |
| 2 | Ronald Rauhe; Timo Haseleu | Germany | 32.659 | QS |
| 3 | Ryan Cochrane; Pierre-Luc Poulin | Canada | 33.187 | QS |
| 4 | Kirill Lyapunov; Alexander Dyachenko | Russia | 33.398 | QS |
| 5 | Kyrylo Cernomorov; Denys Lakmanov | Ukraine | 33.709 | QS |
| 6 | Martin Seidl; Ondřej Bišický | Czech Republic | 33.931 | QS |
| 7 | Ievgen Karabuta; Mirnazim Javadov | Azerbaijan | 34.953 | QS |
| 8 | Li Zhuang; Yan Jiahao | China | 37.181 | |

==== Heat 3 ====
| Rank | Kayakers | Country | Time | Notes |
|---|---|---|---|---|
| 1 | Marko Novaković; Nebojša Grujić | Serbia | 33.155 | QA |
| 2 | Dzmitry Tratsiakou; Vadzim Makhneu | Belarus | 34.005 | QS |
| 3 | Maks Franceskin; Vid Debeljak | Slovenia | 34.383 | QS |
| 4 | Franck Le Moël; Pierrick Bayle | France | 34.533 | QS |
| 5 | Maksim Bondar; Kirill Bondar | Kyrgyzstan | 35.833 | QS |
| 6 | Stav Mizrahi; Matti Stern | Israel | 36.039 | QS |
| – | Camerson Hudson; Calvin Clack | South Africa | DNS | |

=== Semifinals ===
Qualification was as follows:

The fastest three boats in each semi advanced to the A final.
The next four fastest boats in each semi, plus the fastest remaining boat advanced to the B final.

==== Semifinal 1 ====
| Rank | Kayakers | Country | Time | Notes |
|---|---|---|---|---|
| 1 | Michele Bertolini; Riccardo Maria Spotti | Italy | 32.315 | QA |
| 2 | Ryan Cochrane; Pierre-Luc Poulin | Canada | 32.604 | QA |
| 3 | Piotr Mazur; Paweł Kaczmarek | Poland | 32.715 | QA |
| 4 | Kyrylo Cernomorov; Denys Lakmanov | Ukraine | 33.176 | QB |
| 5 | Joel Elenius; David Johansson | Sweden | 33.409 | QB |
| 6 | Franck Le Moël; Pierrick Bayle | France | 33.493 | QB |
| 7 | Maks Franceskin; Vid Debeljak | Slovenia | 33.570 | QB |
| 8 | Ievgen Karabuta; Mirnazim Javadov | Azerbaijan | 34.281 | qB |
| 9 | Stav Mizrahi; Matti Stern | Israel | 34.576 | |

==== Semifinal 2 ====
| Rank | Kayakers | Country | Time | Notes |
|---|---|---|---|---|
| 1 | Ronald Rauhe; Timo Haseleu | Germany | 31.816 | QA |
| 2 | Kirill Lyapunov; Alexander Dyachenko | Russia | 32.027 | QA |
| 3 | Aurimas Lankas; Edvinas Ramanauskas | Lithuania | 32.077 | QA |
| 4 | Dzmitry Tratsiakou; Vadzim Makhneu | Belarus | 32.533 | QB |
| 5 | Miroslav Zaťko; Ľubomír Beňo | Slovakia | 32.689 | QB |
| 6 | Martin Seidl; Ondřej Bišický | Czech Republic | 33.533 | QB |
| 7 | Aditep Srichart; Praison Buasamrong | Thailand | 34.311 | QB |
| 8 | Maksim Bondar; Kirill Bondar | Kyrgyzstan | 34.666 | |

=== Finals ===
==== Final B ====
Competitors in this final raced for positions 10 to 18.

| Rank | Kayakers | Country | Time |
|---|---|---|---|
| 1 | Miroslav Zaťko; Ľubomír Beňo | Slovakia | 32.672 |
| 2 | Dzmitry Tratsiakou; Vadzim Makhneu | Belarus | 32.733 |
| 3 | Kyrylo Cernomorov; Denys Lakmanov | Ukraine | 33.083 |
| 4 | Martin Seidl; Ondřej Bišický | Czech Republic | 33.111 |
| 5 | Joel Elenius; David Johansson | Sweden | 33.333 |
| 6 | Franck Le Moël; Pierrick Bayle | France | 33.439 |
| 7 | Maks Franceskin; Vid Debeljak | Slovenia | 33.561 |
| 8 | Aditep Srichart; Praison Buasamrong | Thailand | 34.500 |
| 9 | Ievgen Karabuta; Mirnazim Javadov | Azerbaijan | 34.789 |

==== Final A ====
Competitors in this final raced for positions 1 to 9, with medals going to the top three.

| Rank | Kayakers | Country | Time |
|---|---|---|---|
| 1st place, gold medalist(s) | Balázs Birkás; Márk Balaska | Hungary | 30.912 |
| 2nd place, silver medalist(s) | Cristian Toro; Carlos Garrote | Spain | 31.278 |
| 3rd place, bronze medalist(s) | Marko Novaković; Nebojša Grujić | Serbia | 31.451 |
| 4 | Kirill Lyapunov; Alexander Dyachenko | Russia | 31.473 |
| 5 | Michele Bertolini; Riccardo Maria Spotti | Italy | 31.623 |
| 6 | Ronald Rauhe; Timo Haseleu | Germany | 31.645 |
| 7 | Piotr Mazur; Paweł Kaczmarek | Poland | 31.906 |
| 8 | Ryan Cochrane; Pierre-Luc Poulin | Canada | 31.962 |
| 9 | Aurimas Lankas; Edvinas Ramanauskas | Lithuania | 32.067 |
