= 2018 ICF Canoe Sprint World Championships – Men's K-2 200 metres =

Men's K-2 200 metres at the 2018 ICF Canoe Sprint World Championships
- Venue: Centro de Alto Rendimento de Montemor-o-Velho
- Location: Montemor-o-Velho, Portugal
- Dates: 23–25 August
- Competitors: 34 from 17 nations
- Winning time: 31.873

Medalists
gold medal	Márk Balaska; Balázs Birkás	Hungary
silver medal	Saúl Craviotto; Cristian Toro	Spain
bronze medal	Nebojša Grujić; Marko Novaković	Serbia

The men's K-2 200 metres competition at the 2018 ICF Canoe Sprint World Championships in Montemor-o-Velho took place at the Centro de Alto Rendimento de Montemor-o-Velho.

== Schedule ==
The schedule was as follows:

Date	Time	Round
Thursday 23 August 2018	14:40	Heats
Thursday 23 August 2018	16:15	Semifinal
Saturday 25 August 2018	12:57	Final

All times are Western European Summer Time (UTC+1)

== Results ==
=== Heats ===
The fastest three boats in each heat advanced directly to the final. The next four fastest boats in each heat, plus the fastest remaining boat advanced to the semifinal.

==== Heat 1 ====
Rank	Kayakers	Country	Time	Notes
1	Kirill Lyapunov; Alexander Dyachenko	Russia	32.000	QF
2	Márk Balaska; Balázs Birkás	Hungary	32.070	QF
3	Edvinas Ramanauskas; Ignas Navakauskas	Lithuania	32.390	QF
4	Riccardo Maria Spotti; Andrea di Liberto	Italy	32.675	QS
5	Franck Le Moël; Francis Mouget	France	32.875	QS
6	Kevin Santos; Hugo Figueiras	Portugal	34.725	QS
7	Vitalii Brezitskyi; Vasyl Chedryk	Ukraine	35.900	QS
8	Abdelmajid Jabbour; Ossama Bousserra	Morocco	40.205	

==== Heat 2 ====
Rank	Kayakers	Country	Time	Notes
1	Saúl Craviotto; Cristian Toro	Spain	32.203	QF
2	Nebojša Grujić; Marko Novaković	Serbia	32.313	QF
3	Paweł Kaczmarek; Piotr Mazur	Poland	33.038	QF
4	Filip Šváb; Ondřej Bišický	Czech Republic	33.533	QS
5	Mark de Jonge; Alex Scott	Canada	33.838	QS
6	Nicholas Weeks; David Rodrigues	South Africa	33.883	QS
7	Trevor Thomson; Stelian Naftanaila	Great Britain	34.053	QS
8	Theodor Orban; David Johansson	Sweden	34.438	qS
9	Edvards Ceipe; Kristofers Lamberts	Latvia	34.588	

=== Semifinal ===
The fastest three boats advanced to the final.

Rank	Kayakers	Country	Time	Notes
1	Franck Le Moël; Francis Mouget	France	33.530	QF
2	Riccardo Maria Spotti; Andrea di Liberto	Italy	33.540	QF
3	Filip Šváb; Ondřej Bišický	Czech Republic	34.385	QF
4	Nicholas Weeks; David Rodrigues	South Africa	34.715	
5	Theodor Orban; David Johansson	Sweden	34.730	
6	Mark de Jonge; Alex Scott	Canada	34.895	
7	Trevor Thomson; Stelian Naftanaila	Great Britain	34.905	
8	Kevin Santos; Hugo Figueiras	Portugal	35.975	
9	Vitalii Brezitskyi; Vasyl Chedryk	Ukraine	37.460	

=== Final ===
Competitors raced for positions 1 to 9, with medals going to the top three.

Rank	Kayakers	Country	Time
1st place, gold medalist(s)	Márk Balaska; Balázs Birkás	Hungary	31.873
2nd place, silver medalist(s)	Saúl Craviotto; Cristian Toro	Spain	32.133
3rd place, bronze medalist(s)	Nebojša Grujić; Marko Novaković	Serbia	32.156
4	Kirill Lyapunov; Alexander Dyachenko	Russia	32.233
5	Paweł Kaczmarek; Piotr Mazur	Poland	32.753
6	Edvinas Ramanauskas; Ignas Navakauskas	Lithuania	32.790
7	Riccardo Maria Spotti; Andrea di Liberto	Italy	32.823
8	Filip Šváb; Ondřej Bišický	Czech Republic	33.136
9	Franck Le Moël; Francis Mouget	France	33.213
