= Belgium at the 2012 Summer Olympics =

- IOC code: BEL
- NOC: Belgian Olympic and Interfederal Committee
- Website: www.teambelgium.be (in Dutch and French)

in London
- Competitors: 119 in 16 sports
- Flag bearers: Tia Hellebaut (opening); Lionel Cox (closing)
- Medals Ranked 60th: Gold 0 Silver 1 Bronze 2 Total 3

Summer Olympics appearances (overview)
- 1900; 1904; 1908; 1912; 1920; 1924; 1928; 1932; 1936; 1948; 1952; 1956; 1960; 1964; 1968; 1972; 1976; 1980; 1984; 1988; 1992; 1996; 2000; 2004; 2008; 2012; 2016; 2020; 2024; 2028

Other related appearances
- 1906 Intercalated Games

Belgium competed at the 2012 Summer Olympics in London, United Kingdom, from 27 July to 12 August 2012. The Belgian Olympic Committee sent the nation's largest delegation to the Games since 1976. A total of 119 athletes, 75 men and 44 women, competed in 16 sports. There was only a single competitor in slalom canoeing, BMX cycling, equestrian dressage, rowing, shooting, table tennis, and weightlifting. Field hockey was the only team event in which Belgium was represented at these Olympic games.

The Belgian team featured twins and national track stars Kevin and Jonathan Borlée, and the defending champion Tia Hellebaut in the women's high jump. Hellebaut was also appointed by the Belgian Olympic Committee to carry the nation's flag at the opening ceremony. Table tennis player and multiple-time world champion Jean-Michel Saive became the first Belgian athlete to compete in seven Olympic games. Equestrian show jumper Jos Lansink was also at his seventh Olympic appearance as an individual athlete, having participated as part of the Belgian team since 2004 (three of his appearances were representing the Netherlands).

Belgium, however, failed to win the gold medal for the first time since 2004, leaving with only three medals. Judoka Charline Van Snick and laser sailor Evi Van Acker settled for the bronze medals in their respective sports, while Lionel Cox won the silver in rifle shooting.

== Medalists ==
| Medal | Name | Sport | Event | Date |
|---|---|---|---|---|
| Silver | Lionel Cox | Shooting | Men's 50 m rifle prone | 3 August |
| Bronze | Charline Van Snick | Judo | Women's 48 kg | 28 July |
| Bronze | Evi Van Acker | Sailing | Women's Laser Radial | 6 August |

== Athletics ==
Belgian athletes have so far achieved qualifying standards in the following athletics events (up to a maximum of 3 athletes in each event at the 'A' Standard, and 1 at the 'B' Standard):

Key

- Note – Ranks given for track events are within the athlete's heat only
- Q = Qualified for the next round
- q = Qualified for the next round as a fastest loser or, in field events, by position without achieving the qualifying target
- NR = National record
- N/A = Round not applicable for the event
- Bye = Athlete not required to compete in round

Men
Track & road events

| Athlete | Event | Heat | | Semifinal | | Final | |
| Athlete | Event | Result | Rank | Result | Rank | Result | Rank |
|---|---|---|---|---|---|---|---|
| Jonathan Borlée | 400 m | 44.43 NR | 1 Q | 44.99 | 3 q | 44.83 | 6 |
| Kevin Borlée | 400 m | 45.14 | 1 Q | 44.84 | 2 Q | 44.81 | 5 |
| Michael Bultheel | 400 m hurdles | 49.18 PB | 6 q | 49.10 PB | 6 | Did not advance | |
| Adrien Deghelt | 110 m hurdles | 13.52 PB | 3 Q | 13.42 PB | 4 | Did not advance | |
| Jonathan Borlée; Kevin Borlée; Michael Bultheel; Nils Duerinck*; Antoine Gillet | 4 × 400 m relay | 3:01.70 | 4 q | —N/a | | 3:01.83 | 6 |

* Competed in heats only

Combined events – Decathlon

| Athlete | Event | 100 m | LJ | SP | HJ | 400 m | 110H | DT | PV | JT | 1500 m | Final | Rank |
|---|---|---|---|---|---|---|---|---|---|---|---|---|---|
| Hans van Alphen | Result | 11.05 | 7.64 PB | 15.48 | 2.05 | 49.18 | 14.89 | 48.28 | 4.80 | 61.69 | 4:22.50 | 8447 | 4 |
| Hans van Alphen | Points | 850 | 970 | 819 | 850 | 853 | 863 | 835 | 849 | 763 | 795 | 8447 | 4 |

Women
Track & road events

| Athlete | Event | Heat | | Semifinal | | Final | |
| Athlete | Event | Result | Rank | Result | Rank | Result | Rank |
|---|---|---|---|---|---|---|---|
| Almensch Belete | 5000 m | 15:10.24 | 11 | —N/a | | Did not advance | |
| Eline Berings | 100 m hurdles | 13.46 | 2 Q | 13.46 | 7 | Did not advance | |
| Elodie Ouedraogo | 400 m hurdles | 55.89 | 4 Q | 55.20 PB | 4 | Did not advance | |
| Anne Zagré | 100 m hurdles | 13.04 | 4 q | 12.94 | 6 | Did not advance | |

Field events

| Athlete | Event | Qualification | | Final | |
| Athlete | Event | Distance | Position | Distance | Position |
|---|---|---|---|---|---|
| Svetlana Bolshakova | Triple jump | 13.84 | 21 | Did not advance | |
| Tia Hellebaut | High jump | 1.93 | =2 q | 1.97 | 5 |

Combined events – Heptathlon

| Athlete | Event | 100H | HJ | SP | 200 m | LJ | JT | 800 m | Final | Rank |
|---|---|---|---|---|---|---|---|---|---|---|
| Sara Aerts | Result | 12.94 PB | 1.65 | 14.43 PB | DNS | — | — | — | DNF | |
| Sara Aerts | Points | 1133 | 795 | 823 | 0 | — | — | — | DNF | |

== Badminton ==
| Athlete | Event | Group Stage | | | Elimination | Quarterfinal | Semifinal | Final / BM | |
| Athlete | Event | Opposition Score | Opposition Score | Rank | Opposition Score | Opposition Score | Opposition Score | Opposition Score | Rank |
|---|---|---|---|---|---|---|---|---|---|
| Yuhan Tan | Men's singles | Nguyễn T M (VIE); L 21–17, 10–21, 14–21 | Kashyap (IND); L 21–14, 21–12 | 3 | Did not advance | | | | |
| Lianne Tan | Women's singles | Nehwal (IND); L 4–21, 14–21 | Jaquet (SUI); W 21–16, 21–16 | 2 | Did not advance | | | | |

== Canoeing ==
=== Slalom ===
Belgium has so far qualified boats for the following events

| Athlete | Event | Preliminary | | | | | | Semifinal | | Final | |
| Athlete | Event | Run 1 | Rank | Run 2 | Rank | Best | Rank | Time | Rank | Time | Rank |
|---|---|---|---|---|---|---|---|---|---|---|---|
| Mathieu Doby | Men's K-1 | 92.74 | 12 | 87.92 | 3 | 87.92 | 4 Q | 102.58 | 11 | Did not advance | |

=== Sprint ===
Belgium has so far qualified boats for the following events

| Athlete | Event | Heats | | Semifinals | | Final | |
| Athlete | Event | Time | Rank | Time | Rank | Time | Rank |
|---|---|---|---|---|---|---|---|
| Maxime Richard | Men's K-1 200 m | 36.125 | 5 Q | 37.029 | 7 FB | 38.435 | 13 |
| Olivier Cauwenbergh; Laurens Pannecoucke | Men's K-2 200 m | 35.297 | 7 FB | Bye | | 36.336 | 12 |
| Olivier Cauwenbergh; Laurens Pannecoucke | Men's K-2 1000 m | 3:24.304 | 4 Q | 3:15.655 | 5 FB | 3:13.298 | 10 |

Qualification Legend: FA = Qualify to final (medal); FB = Qualify to final B (non-medal)

== Cycling ==
=== Road ===
Men

| Athlete | Event | Time | Rank |
|---|---|---|---|
| Philippe Gilbert | Road race | 5:46.05 | 19 |
| Philippe Gilbert | Time trial | 54:39.98 | 17 |
| Tom Boonen | Road race | 5:46.37 | 28 |
| Jürgen Roelandts | Road race | 5:46.05 | 7 |
| Greg Van Avermaet | Road race | 5:46.37 | 92 |
| Stijn Vandenbergh | Road race | 5:46.51 | 100 |

Women

| Athlete | Event | Time | Rank |
|---|---|---|---|
| Liesbet De Vocht | Road race | 3:35.56 | 9 |
| Liesbet De Vocht | Time trial | 42:08.28 | 23 |
| Ludivine Henrion | Road race | OTL | |
| Maaike Polspoel | Road race | 3:36.01 | 29 |

=== Track ===
Pursuit

| Athlete | Event | Qualification | | Semifinals | | Final | |
| Athlete | Event | Time | Rank | Opponent Results | Rank | Opponent Results | Rank |
|---|---|---|---|---|---|---|---|
| Dominique Cornu; Kenny De Ketele; Gijs Van Hoecke; Jonathan Dufrasne | Men's team pursuit | 4:04.053 | 9 | Did not advance | | | |

Omnium

| Athlete | Event | Flying lap | | Points race | | Elimination race | Individual pursuit | | Scratch race | Time trial | | Total points | Rank |
| Athlete | Event | Time | Rank | Points | Rank | Rank | Time | Rank | Rank | Time | Rank | Total points | Rank |
|---|---|---|---|---|---|---|---|---|---|---|---|---|---|
| Gijs Van Hoecke | Men's omnium | 13.633 | 13 | 23 | 9 | 18 | 4:29.992 | 10 | 15 | 1:04.748 | 12 | 77 | 15 |
| Jolien D'Hoore | Women's omnium | 14.594 | 10 | 25 | 5 | 6 | 3:41.495 | 8 | 5 | 36.585 | 12 | 45 | 5 |

The Belgian Olympic Committee sent Gijs Van Hoecke home from the London Games after pictures appeared in British newspapers of him looking drunk and being carried into a taxi after a night out in the city.

=== Mountain biking ===
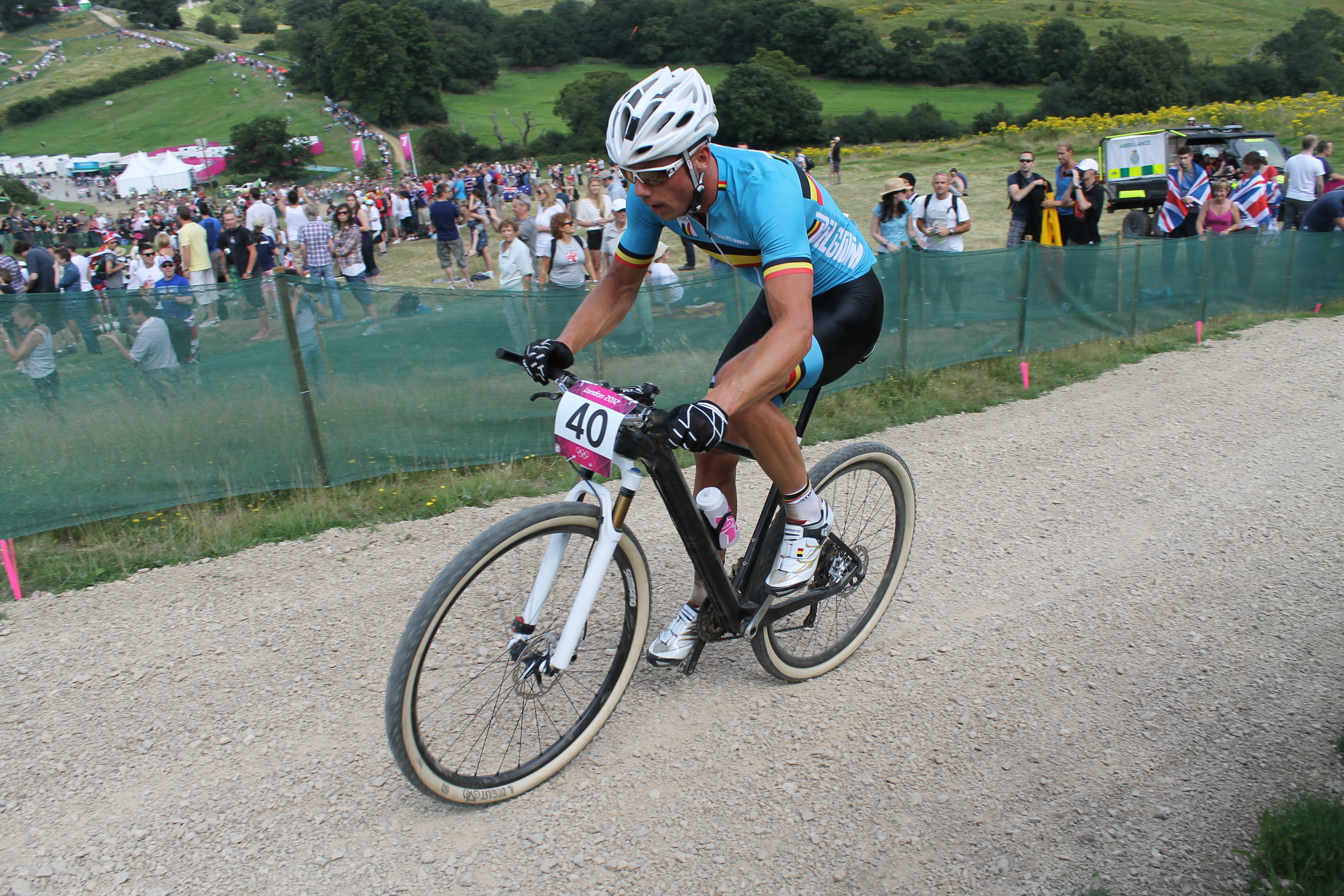
Sven Nys in men's cross-country race

Men

| Athlete | Event | Time | Rank |
|---|---|---|---|
| Sven Nys | Men's cross-country | Did not finish | |
| Kevin Van Hoovels | Men's cross-country | 1:33:01 | 19 |

=== BMX ===
| Athlete | Event | Seeding | | Quarterfinal | | Semifinal | | Final | |
| Athlete | Event | Result | Rank | Points | Rank | Points | Rank | Result | Rank |
|---|---|---|---|---|---|---|---|---|---|
| Arnaud Dubois | Men's BMX | 39.772 | 27 | 24 | 6 | Did not advance | | | |

== Equestrian ==
=== Dressage ===
| Athlete | Horse | Event | Grand Prix | | Grand Prix Special | | Grand Prix Freestyle | | Overall | |
| Athlete | Horse | Event | Score | Rank | Score | Rank | Technical | Artistic | Score | Rank |
|---|---|---|---|---|---|---|---|---|---|---|
| Claudia Fassaert | Donnerfee | Individual | 71.793 | 21 Q | 70.095 | 27 | Did not advance | | | |

=== Eventing ===
Qualified places

| Athlete | Horse | Event | Dressage | | Cross-country | | | Jumping | | | | | | Total | |
| Athlete | Horse | Event | Dressage | | Cross-country | | | Qualifier | | | Final | | | Total | |
| Athlete | Horse | Event | Penalties | Rank | Penalties | Total | Rank | Penalties | Total | Rank | Penalties | Total | Rank | Penalties | Rank |
|---|---|---|---|---|---|---|---|---|---|---|---|---|---|---|---|
| Carl Bouckaert | Mensa | Individual | 53.00 | 45 | Eliminated | | | Did not advance | | | | | | | |
| Virginie Caulier | Nepal du Sudre | Individual | 48.30 | 30 | 21.20 | 69.50 | 36 | 9.00 | 78.50 | 34 | Did not advance | | | 78.50 | 34 |
| Karin Donckers | Gazelle de la Brasserie | Individual | 40.00 | 7 | 11.60 | 51.60 | 18 | 4.00 | 55.60 | 18 Q | 6.00 | 61.60 | 15 | 61.60 | 15 |
| Marc Rigouts | Dunkas | Individual | 50.70 | 36 | 56.80 | 107.50 | 51 | Withdrew | | | Did not advance | | | | |
| Joris Vanspringel | Lully des Aulnes | Individual | 51.90 | 41 | 12.80 | 64.70 | 34 | Withdrew | | | Did not advance | | | | |
| Carl Bouckaert; Virginie Caulier; Karin Donckers; Marc Rigouts; Joris Vanspringel | See above | Team | 139.00 | 8 | 46.80 | 185.80 | 8 | 948.30 | 1134.10 | 10 | —N/a | | | 1134.10 | 10 |

=== Show jumping ===
| Athlete | Horse | Event | Qualification | | | | | | | | Final | | | | | Total | |
| Athlete | Horse | Event | Round 1 | | Round 2 | | | Round 3 | | | Round A | | Round B | | | Total | |
| Athlete | Horse | Event | Penalties | Rank | Penalties | Total | Rank | Penalties | Total | Rank | Penalties | Rank | Penalties | Total | Rank | Penalties | Rank |
|---|---|---|---|---|---|---|---|---|---|---|---|---|---|---|---|---|---|
| Dirk Demeersman | Bufero van het Panishof | Individual | 0 | =1 Q | 8 | 8 | =31 Q | 12 | 20 | =38 R | 9 | =26 | Did not advance | | | 9 | =26 |
| Jos Lansink | Valentina van't Heike | Individual | 0 | =1 Q | 4 | 4 | =17 Q | 4 | 8 | =11 Q | 8 | =23 | Did not advance | | | 8 | =23 |
| Philippe Lejeune | Vigo d'Arsouilles | Individual | 0 | =1 Q | 8 | 8 | =31 Q | Withdrew | | | Did not advance | | | | | | |
| Grégory Wathelet | Cadjanine Z | Individual | 4 | =42 Q | 4 | 8 | =31 Q | 4 | 12 | =26 Q | 12 | =29 | Did not advance | | | 12 | =29 |
| Dirk Demeersman; Jos Lansink; Philippe Lejeune; Grégory Wathelet | See above | Team | —N/a | | | | | | | | 16 | 13 | Did not advance | | | 16 | 13 |

== Field hockey ==
Both the men's team and women's team have qualified and will consist of 16 players each.

=== Men's tournament ===
The following is the Belgium roster in the men's field hockey tournament of the 2012 Summer Olympics.

Head Coach: Colin Batch

2. Xavier Reckinger
5. Jerome Dekeyser
7. John-John Dohmen
8. Florent van Aubel
9. Maxime Luycx
10. Cedric Charlier
11. Benjamin Van Hove
12. Gauthier Boccard
13. Jeffrey Thys
17. Thomas Briels
19. Felix Denayer
21. Vincent Vanasch (GK)
22. Simon Gougnard
23. Alexandre De Saedeleer
27. Tom Boon
28. Jerome Truyens (C)

Reserves:

- Emmanuel Leroy (GK)
- Elliot Van Strydonck

Group play

| Pos | Team | Pld | W | D | L | GF | GA | GD | Pts | Qualification |
|---|---|---|---|---|---|---|---|---|---|---|
| 1 | Netherlands | 5 | 5 | 0 | 0 | 18 | 7 | +11 | 15 | Semi-finals |
| 2 | Germany | 5 | 3 | 1 | 1 | 14 | 11 | +3 | 10 | Semi-finals |
| 3 | Belgium | 5 | 2 | 1 | 2 | 8 | 7 | +1 | 7 | Fifth place game |
| 4 | South Korea | 5 | 2 | 0 | 3 | 9 | 8 | +1 | 6 | Seventh place game |
| 5 | New Zealand | 5 | 1 | 2 | 2 | 10 | 14 | −4 | 5 | Ninth place game |
| 6 | India | 5 | 0 | 0 | 5 | 6 | 18 | −12 | 0 | Eleventh place game |

Source: FIH

30 July 2012
21:15

| Germany | 2–1 | Belgium |
|---|---|---|
| Fuchs 13'; Zeller 45' | Report | Dekeyser 4' |

Umpires:
Colin Hutchinson (IRL)
Marcelo Servetto (ESP)

1 August 2012
10:45

| Belgium | 1–3 | Netherlands |
|---|---|---|
| Dekeyser 58' | Report | Van der Weerden 43', 62'; De Voogd 70' |

Umpires:
Hamish Jamson (NZL)
Gary Simmonds (RSA)

3 August 2012
21:15

| Belgium | 2–1 | South Korea |
|---|---|---|
| Boon 37'; Charlier 61' | Report | Nam 46' |

Umpires:
David Gentles (AUS)
Nigel Iggo (NZL)

5 August 2012
08:30

| New Zealand | 1–1 | Belgium |
|---|---|---|
| Wilson 54' | Report | Boon 48' |

Umpires:
German Montes de Oca (ARG)
Roel van Eert (NED)

7 August 2012
16:00

| India | 0–3 | Belgium |
|---|---|---|
| | Report | Dekeyser 15'; Boccard 47'; Boon 67' |

Umpires:
Kim Hong-lae (KOR)
Nigel Iggo (NZL)

5th/6th place

11 August 2012
11:30

| Spain | 2–5 | Belgium |
|---|---|---|
| Alegre 19'; Tubau 61' | Report | Dekeyser 3'; Boon 21', 32'; Van Aubel 24'; Briels 52' |

Umpires:
Roel van Eert (NED)
Colin Hutchinson (IRL)

=== Women's tournament ===
The following is the Belgium roster in the women's field hockey tournament of the 2012 Summer Olympics.

Head Coach: Pascal Kina

3. Louise Cavenaile
5. Stephanie de Groof
6. Anouk Raes
7. Judith Vandermeiren
9. Lieselotte van Lindt
10. Lola Danhaive
11. Erica Coppey
12. Gaëlle Valcke
13. Alix Gerniers
14. Emilie Sinia
15. Charlotte de Vos (C)
17. Anne-Sophie van Regemortel
19. Barbara Nelen
21. Aisling D'Hooghe (GK)
22. Hélène Delmée
27. Jill Boon

Reserves:

- Nadine Khouzam (GK)
- Valerie Vermeersch

Group play

| Pos | Team | Pld | W | D | L | GF | GA | GD | Pts | Qualification |
|---|---|---|---|---|---|---|---|---|---|---|
| 1 | Netherlands | 5 | 5 | 0 | 0 | 12 | 5 | +7 | 15 | Semi-finals |
| 2 | Great Britain (H) | 5 | 3 | 0 | 2 | 14 | 7 | +7 | 9 | Semi-finals |
| 3 | China | 5 | 2 | 1 | 2 | 6 | 3 | +3 | 7 | |
| 4 | South Korea | 5 | 2 | 0 | 3 | 9 | 13 | −4 | 6 | |
| 5 | Japan | 5 | 1 | 1 | 3 | 4 | 9 | −5 | 4 | |
| 6 | Belgium | 5 | 0 | 2 | 3 | 2 | 10 | −8 | 2 | |

Source: FIH
Rules for classification: 1) Points; 2) Matches won; 3) Goal difference; 4) Goals for; 5) Head-to-head result.
(H) Hosts

29 July 2012
10:45

| Netherlands | 3–0 | Belgium |
|---|---|---|
| Lammers 33', 42' van Maasakker 60' | Report |

Umpires:
Claire Adenot (FRA)
Michelle Joubert (RSA)

31 July 2012
13:45

| Belgium | 0–0 | China |
|---|---|---|
| | Report |

Umpires:
Kelly Hudson (NZL)
Carolina de la Fuente (ARG)

2 August 2012
19:00

| Belgium | 0–3 | Great Britain |
|---|---|---|
| | Report | Ball 32'; Bartlett 39'; Cullen 68' |

Umpires:
Amy Hassick (USA)
Irene Presenqui (ARG)

4 August 2012
13:45

| Japan | 1–1 | Belgium |
|---|---|---|
| Yamamoto 58' | Report | Boon 34' |

Umpires:
Stella Bartlema (NED)
Wendy Stewart (CAN)

6 August 2012
16:00

| South Korea | 3–1 | Belgium |
|---|---|---|
| Kim Jong-eun 8', 70'; Lee Seon-ok 24' | Report | Coppey 37' |

Umpires:
Julie Ashton-Lucy (AUS)
Miao Lin (CHN)

11th/12th place

10 August 2012
08:30

| Belgium | 2–1 | United States |
|---|---|---|
| Gerniers 20'; Valcke 52' | Report | Selenski 6' |

Umpires:
Elena Eskina (RUS)
Irene Presenqui (ARG)

== Gymnastics ==
=== Artistic ===
Men

| Athlete | Event | Qualification | | | | | | | | Final | | | | | | | |
| Athlete | Event | Apparatus | | | | | | Total | Rank | Apparatus | | | | | | Total | Rank |
| Athlete | Event | F | PH | R | V | PB | HB | Total | Rank | F | PH | R | V | PB | HB | Total | Rank |
|---|---|---|---|---|---|---|---|---|---|---|---|---|---|---|---|---|---|
| Jimmy Verbaeys | All-around | 14.500 | 10.866 | 14.066 | 15.266 | 14.533 | 14.333 | 83.564 | 31 Q | 13.933 | 14.033 | 14.000 | 15.266 | 14.833 | 13.166 | 85.231 | 21 |

Women

| Athlete | Event | Qualification | | | | | | Final | | | | | |
| Athlete | Event | Apparatus | | | | Total | Rank | Apparatus | | | | Total | Rank |
| Athlete | Event | F | V | UB | BB | Total | Rank | F | V | UB | BB | Total | Rank |
|---|---|---|---|---|---|---|---|---|---|---|---|---|---|
| Gaëlle Mys | All-around | 13.533 | 13.266 | 13.733 | 13.166 | 53.698 | 31 | Did not advance | | | | | |

== Judo ==
| Athlete | Event | Round of 64 | Round of 32 | Round of 16 | Quarterfinals | Semifinals | Repechage | Final / BM | |
| Athlete | Event | Opposition Result | Opposition Result | Opposition Result | Opposition Result | Opposition Result | Opposition Result | Opposition Result | Rank |
|---|---|---|---|---|---|---|---|---|---|
| Dirk Van Tichelt | Men's −73 kg | Bye | Remeleh (PLE); W 0100–0000 | Delpopolo (USA); L 0000–0001 | Did not advance | | | | |
| Joachim Bottieau | Men's −81 kg | Bye | Simmonds (PAN); W 1100–0001 | Nifontov (RUS); L 0000–0010 | Did not advance | | | | |
| Elco van der Geest | Men's −100 kg | —N/a | Khaibulaev (RUS); L 0100–0000 | Did not advance | | | | | |
| Charline Van Snick | Women's −48 kg | —N/a | Bye | Chung J-y (KOR); W 1000–0000 | Csernoviczki (HUN); W 1001–0000 | Menezes (BRA); L 0000–0001 | Bye | Pareto (ARG); W 0011–0002 | 3rd place, bronze medalist(s) |
| Ilse Heylen | Women's −52 kg | —N/a | Bye | Chițu (ROU); W 0010–0000 | Legentil (MRI); W 0020–0002 | Bermoy (CUB); L 0002–0011 | Bye | Gneto (FRA); L 0001–1001 | 5 |

== Rowing ==
Belgium has qualified the following boats.

Men

| Athlete | Event | Heats | | Repechage | | Quarterfinals | | Semifinals | | Final | |
| Athlete | Event | Time | Rank | Time | Rank | Time | Rank | Time | Rank | Time | Rank |
|---|---|---|---|---|---|---|---|---|---|---|---|
| Tim Maeyens | Single sculls | 6:42.52 OB | 1 QF | Bye | | 6:56.65 | 2 SA/B | 7:39.78 | 6 FB | 7:27.51 | 12 |

Qualification Legend: FA=Final A (medal); FB=Final B (non-medal); FC=Final C (non-medal); FD=Final D (non-medal); FE=Final E (non-medal); FF=Final F (non-medal); SA/B=Semifinals A/B; SC/D=Semifinals C/D; SE/F=Semifinals E/F; QF=Quarterfinals; R=Repechage

== Sailing ==
Men

| Athlete | Event | Race | | | | | | | | | | | Net points | Final rank |
| Athlete | Event | 1 | 2 | 3 | 4 | 5 | 6 | 7 | 8 | 9 | 10 | M* | Net points | Final rank |
|---|---|---|---|---|---|---|---|---|---|---|---|---|---|---|
| Wannes Van Laer | Laser | 19 | 26 | 29 | 26 | 30 | 38 | 32 | ~~50~~ | 42 | 36 | EL | 276 | 34 |

Women

| Athlete | Event | Race | | | | | | | | | | | Net points | Final rank |
| Athlete | Event | 1 | 2 | 3 | 4 | 5 | 6 | 7 | 8 | 9 | 10 | M* | Net points | Final rank |
|---|---|---|---|---|---|---|---|---|---|---|---|---|---|---|
| Sigrid Rondelez | RS:X | 18 | 21 | 19 | ~~27~~ | 15 | 13 | 14 | 14 | 17 | 19 | EL | 150 | 17 |
| Evi Van Acker | Laser Radial | 3 | 2 | 3 | ~~8~~ | 1 | 5 | 8 | 1 | 8 | 3 | 6 | 40 | 3rd place, bronze medalist(s) |

M = Medal race; EL = Eliminated – did not advance into the medal race

== Shooting ==
Men

| Athlete | Event | Qualification | | Final | |
| Athlete | Event | Points | Rank | Points | Rank |
|---|---|---|---|---|---|
| Lionel Cox | 50 m rifle prone | 599 | 2 Q | 701.2 | 2nd place, silver medalist(s) |

== Swimming ==
Swimmers have so far achieved qualifying standards in the following events (up to a maximum of 2 swimmers in each event at the Olympic Qualifying Time (OQT), and potentially 1 at the Olympic Selection Time (OST)):

Men

| Athlete | Event | Heat | | Semifinal | | Final | |
| Athlete | Event | Time | Rank | Time | Rank | Time | Rank |
|---|---|---|---|---|---|---|---|
| Jasper Aerents | 50 m freestyle | 22.43 | 23 | Did not advance | | | |
| Ward Bauwens | 400 m individual medley | 4:16.71 NR | 16 | —N/a | | Did not advance | |
| François Heersbrandt | 100 m butterfly | 52.22 | =13 Q | 52.71 | 16 | Did not advance | |
| Brian Ryckeman | 10 km open water | —N/a | | | | 1:51:27.1 | 16 |
| Glenn Surgeloose | 200 m freestyle | 1:48.77 | 25 | Did not advance | | | |
| Pieter Timmers | 100 m freestyle | 48.54 NR | 6 Q | 48.57 | =12 | Did not advance | |
| Jasper Aerents; Dieter Dekoninck; Pieter Timmers; Emmanuel Vanluchenne; Yoris Grandjean | 4 × 100 m freestyle relay | 3:13.89 NR | 6 Q | —N/a | | 3:14.40 | 8 |
| Louis Croenen; Dieter Dekoninck; Glenn Surgeloose; Pieter Timmers; Yoris Grandjean | 4 × 200 m freestyle relay | 7:14.44 | 12 | —N/a | | Did not advance | |

Women

| Athlete | Event | Heat | | Semifinal | | Final | |
| Athlete | Event | Time | Rank | Time | Rank | Time | Rank |
|---|---|---|---|---|---|---|---|
| Kimberly Buys | 100 m backstroke | 1:01.92 | 29 | Did not advance | | | |
| Kimberly Buys | 100 m butterfly | 58.79 | 19 | Did not advance | | | |
| Fanny Lecluyse | 200 m breaststroke | 2:27.30 | 19 | Did not advance | | | |
| Jolien Sysmans | 50 m freestyle | 25.60 | 31 | Did not advance | | | |

== Table tennis ==
| Athlete | Event | Preliminary round | Round 1 | Round 2 | Round 3 | Round 4 | Quarterfinals | Semifinals | Final / BM | |
| Athlete | Event | Opposition Result | Opposition Result | Opposition Result | Opposition Result | Opposition Result | Opposition Result | Opposition Result | Opposition Result | Rank |
|---|---|---|---|---|---|---|---|---|---|---|
| Jean-Michel Saive | Men's singles | Bye | Jevtović (SRB); W 4–1 | Kreanga (GRE); L 1–4 | Did not advance | | | | | |

== Tennis ==
| Athlete | Event | Round of 64 | Round of 32 | Round of 16 | Quarterfinals | Semifinals | Final / BM | |
| Athlete | Event | Opposition Score | Opposition Score | Opposition Score | Opposition Score | Opposition Score | Opposition Score | Rank |
|---|---|---|---|---|---|---|---|---|
| Steve Darcis | Men's singles | Berdych (CZE); W 6–4, 6–4 | Giraldo (COL); W 6–7^{(4–7)}, 6–4, 6–4 | Almagro (ESP); L 5–7, 3–6 | Did not advance | | | |
| David Goffin | Men's singles | Mónaco (ARG); L 4–6, 1–6 | Did not advance | | | | | |
| Olivier Rochus | Men's singles | Isner (USA); L 6–7^{(1–7)}, 4–6 | Did not advance | | | | | |
| Kim Clijsters | Women's singles | Vinci (ITA); W 6–1, 6–4 | Suárez Navarro (ESP); W 6–3, 6–3 | Ivanovic (SRB); W 6–3, 6–4 | Sharapova (RUS); L 2–6, 5–7 | Did not advance | | |
| Yanina Wickmayer | Women's singles | Medina Garrigues (ESP); W 6–2, 4–6, 7–5 | Wozniacki (DEN); L 4–6, 6–3, 3–6 | Did not advance | | | | |

== Triathlon ==
Belgium has qualified the following athletes.

| Athlete | Event | Swim (1.5 km) | Trans 1 | Bike (40 km) | Trans 2 | Run (10 km) | Total Time | Rank |
|---|---|---|---|---|---|---|---|---|
| Simon De Cuyper | Men's | 17:58 | 0:42 | 59:45 | 0:25 | 31:10 | 1:50:00 | 26 |
| Katrien Verstuyft | Women's | 19:43 | 0:45 | 1:07:30 | 0:31 | 35:40 | 2:03:38 | 28 |

== Weightlifting ==
Belgium has qualified 1 man.

| Athlete | Event | Snatch | | Clean & Jerk | | Total | Rank |
| Athlete | Event | Result | Rank | Result | Rank | Total | Rank |
|---|---|---|---|---|---|---|---|
| Tom Goegebuer | Men's −56 kg | 115 | 13 | 132 | 14 | 247 | 12 |

== See also ==
- Belgium at the 2012 Winter Youth Olympics
- Belgium at the 2012 Summer Paralympics
