= Canoeing at the 2012 Summer Olympics – Men's K-2 200 metres =

Men's canoe sprint K-2 200 metres at the Games of the XXX Olympiad
- Venue: Eton Dorney
- Date: 10 to 11 August
- Competitors: 28 from 14 nations
- Winning time: 33.507

Medalists
1st place, gold medalist(s)		Yury Postrigay; Alexander Dyachenko	Russia
2nd place, silver medalist(s)		Raman Piatrushenka; Vadzim Makhneu	Belarus
3rd place, bronze medalist(s)		Liam Heath; Jon Schofield	Great Britain

The men's canoe sprint K-2 200 metres competition at the 2012 Olympic Games in London took place between 10 and 11 August at Eton Dorney.

Yury Postrigay and Alexander Dyachenko, representing Russia, won the gold medal. Raman Piatrushenka and Vadzim Makhneu from Belarus won silver and Great Britain's Liam Heath and Jon Schofield took bronze.

== Format ==
The competition comprised heats, semifinals, and a final round. Heat winners advanced to the "A" final, with all other boats getting a second chance in the semifinals. The top three from each semifinal also advanced to the "A" final, and competed for medals. A placing "B" final was held for the other semifinalists.

== Schedule ==
All times are British Summer Time (UTC+01:00)

Date	Time	Round
Friday 10 August 2012	10:33; 11:44	Heats; Semifinals
Saturday 11 August 2012	10:41	Finals

== Results ==
=== Heats ===
The five best placed boat from each heat qualified for the semifinals, remainder went to the "B" final.

==== Heat 1 ====
Rank	Canoer	Country	Time	Notes
1	Yury Postrigay; Alexander Dyachenko	Russia	32.321	Q
2	Ronald Rauhe; Jonas Ems	Germany	32.905	Q
3	Arnaud Hybois; Sébastien Jouve	France	32.933	Q
4	Ryan Cochrane; Hugues Fournel	Canada	33.407	Q
5	Ionuț Mitrea; Bogdan Mada	Romania	33.978	Q
6	Alexey Dergunov; Yevgeniy Alexeyev	Kazakhstan	34.254	
–	Fernando Pimenta; Emanuel Silva	Portugal		DNS

==== Heat 2 ====
Rank	Canoer	Country	Time	Notes
1	Raman Piatrushenka; Vadzim Makhneu	Belarus	33.129	Q
2	Liam Heath; Jon Schofield	Great Britain	33.364	Q
3	Miguel Correa; Rubén Voisard	Argentina	33.623	Q
4	Stephen Bird; Jesse Phillips	Australia	34.120	Q
5	Krists Straume; Aleksejs Rumjancevs	Latvia	34.447	Q
6	Momotaro Matsushita; Hiroki Watanabe	Japan	34.669	
7	Olivier Cauwenbergh; Laurens Pannecoucke	Belgium	35.297	

=== Semifinals ===
First four boats in each semifinal qualify for the "A" final, remainder go to the "B" final.

==== Semifinal 1 ====
Rank	Canoer	Country	Time	Notes
1	Yury Postrigay; Alexander Dyachenko	Russia	32.051	Q, OB
2	Liam Heath; Jon Schofield	Great Britain	32.940	Q
3	Miguel Correa; Rubén Voisard	Argentina	33.105	Q
4	Ryan Cochrane; Hugues Fournel	Canada	33.500	Q
5	Ionuț Mitrea; Bogdan Mada	Romania	34.253	

==== Semifinal 2 ====
Rank	Canoer	Country	Time	Notes
1	Raman Piatrushenka; Vadzim Makhneu	Belarus	32.641	Q
2	Ronald Rauhe; Jonas Ems	Germany	32.662	Q
3	Arnaud Hybois; Sébastien Jouve	France	32.668	Q
4	Stephen Bird; Jesse Phillips	Australia	34.071	Q
5	Krists Straume; Aleksejs Rumjancevs	Latvia	34.140	

=== Finals ===
==== Final B ====
Rank	Canoer	Country	Time	Notes
1	Alexey Dergunov; Yevgeniy Alexeyev	Kazakhstan	35.494	
2	Momotaro Matsushita; Hiroki Watanabe	Japan	35.739	
3	Krists Straume; Aleksejs Rumjancevs	Latvia	36.110	
4	Olivier Cauwenbergh; Laurens Pannecoucke	Belgium	36.336	
5	Ionuț Mitrea; Bogdan Mada	Romania	46.495	

==== Final A ====
Rank	Canoer	Country	Time	Notes
1st place, gold medalist(s)	Yury Postrigay; Alexander Dyachenko	Russia	33.507	
2nd place, silver medalist(s)	Raman Piatrushenka; Vadzim Makhneu	Belarus	34.266	
3rd place, bronze medalist(s)	Liam Heath; Jon Schofield	Great Britain	34.421	
4	Arnaud Hybois; Sébastien Jouve	France	35.012	
5	Miguel Correa; Rubén Voisard	Argentina	35.271	
6	Stephen Bird; Jesse Phillips	Australia	35.315	
7	Ryan Cochrane; Hugues Fournel	Canada	35.396	
8	Ronald Rauhe; Jonas Ems	Germany	35.405	
