= Ryan Cochrane =

Ryan Cochrane may refer to:

- Ryan Cochrane (soccer) (born 1983), American soccer player
- Ryan Cochrane (canoeist) (born 1983), Canadian canoeist
- Ryan Cochrane (swimmer) (born 1988), Canadian swimmer
