= Nebojša Grujić =

Serbian canoeist (born 1991)

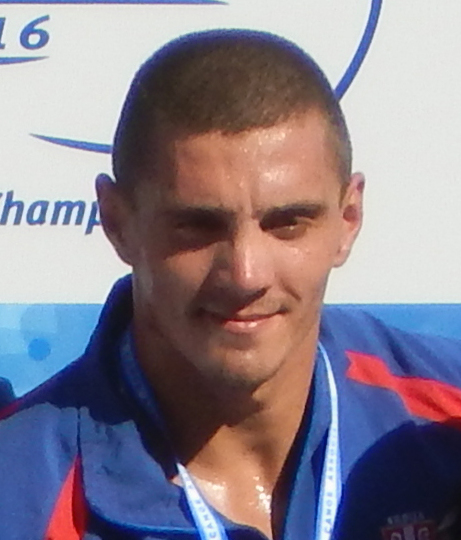

Personal information
- Born: 21 March 1991 (age 35) Šabac, SR Serbia, Yugoslavia
- Height: 1.81 m (5 ft 11 in)
- Weight: 90 kg (198 lb)

Sport
- Country: Serbia
- Sport: Canoe sprint
- Club: Kajak Klub Zorka
Medal record
Men's canoe sprint
Representing Serbia
World Championships
Gold medal – first place	2014 Moscow	K-2 200 m
Silver medal – second place	2015 Milan	K-2 200 m
Bronze medal – third place	2017 Račice	K-2 200 m
Bronze medal – third place	2018 Montemor-o-Velho	K-2 200 m
European Championships
Gold medal – first place	2016 Moscow	K-2 200 m
Silver medal – second place	2015 Račice	K-2 200 m
Silver medal – second place	2018 Belgrade	K-2 200 m
European Games
Gold medal – first place	2015 Baku	K-2 200 m
World U23 Championships
Silver medal – second place	2013 Welland	K-2 200 m
Silver medal – second place	2014 Szeged	K-1 200 m
European U23 Championships
Gold medal – first place	2014 Mantes en Yvelines	K-1 200 m
Silver medal – second place	2013 Poznan	K-2 200 m

Nebojša Grujić (Serbian Cyrillic: Небојша Грујић; born 21 March 1991) is a Serbian sprint canoer.

He won a gold medal in the K-2 200 m event category at the 2014 World Championship in Moscow and set world record with a time of 30.500 seconds with his competition partner, Marko Novaković. His competition partner was Uroš Mitjev, fellow member of canoe sprint club Zorka from Šabac. They have competed together since 2012, and their first results were:

  - 1st and gold medal on International Regata Piestany, Slovakia in k2 200m U23
  - 1st place in B final on European U23 canoe sprint championship in Montemor-O-Velho, Portugal
  - 1st place and gold medal in State Championship in Backa Palanka, Serbia in K2 200m
