= Jesse Phillips (canoeist) =

Australian canoeist (born 1986)

Personal information
- Nationality: Australia
- Born: 26 July 1986 (age 40) Perth, Western Australia, Australia
- Height: 1.89 m (6 ft 2 in)
- Weight: 83 kg (183 lb)
- Website: jessephillips.com.au

Sport
- Sport: Canoeing
- Event: Sprint canoe
- Club: Bayswater Paddle Sports Club
- Team: Double Down Under
- Coached by: Ramon Andersson

Achievements and titles
- Olympic finals: London 2012
- World finals: 2010, 2011, 2013, 2014, 2015
- Highest world ranking: 6
- Personal best: 31.735 seconds

Jesse Phillips (born 26 July 1986) is an Australian sprint canoeist. He is a five-time national champion (2010-2014) in the men's kayak doubles (200 m), and a member of the Bayswater Paddle Sports Club, under his personal coach Ramon Andersson. Phillips has also studied towards a bachelor's degree in media at Murdoch University but deferred due to Olympic qualification and selection commitments.

== Biography ==
Phillips qualified for the men's K-2 200 metres at the 2012 Summer Olympics in London, by placing in the 2012 ICF Oceania Qualification Tournament in Penrith, New South Wales. Phillips and his partner Stephen Bird finished sixth in the final by four hundredths of a second (0.04) behind the Argentine pair Miguel Correa and Rubén Voisard, with a time of 35.315 seconds.

In early 2013 after his first Olympic Games, Jesse alongside doubles partner Stephen Bird commenced as sponsored ambassadors with Perth-based contractor Brierty.

== Acting career ==
In 2002 Jesse started an acting career with the WA Youth Theatre Company whilst in production of Reg Cribb's 'This Endless Shore' at the Fremantle based Victoria Hall. Phillips went on to be a prolific presence on Perth stages and screens with many works in musicals (including Grease, Footloose, Chicago) and student short films. His feature film credits include Woody Island (2010) and The Director's Cut (2009). His most recent performance was as Demetrius in A Midsummer Night's Dream in February 2013 for Fringe World and graduated from the Western Australian Academy of Performing Arts' Diploma in Screen Acting in December 2017.
