= Stephen Bird =

South African-born Australian canoeist

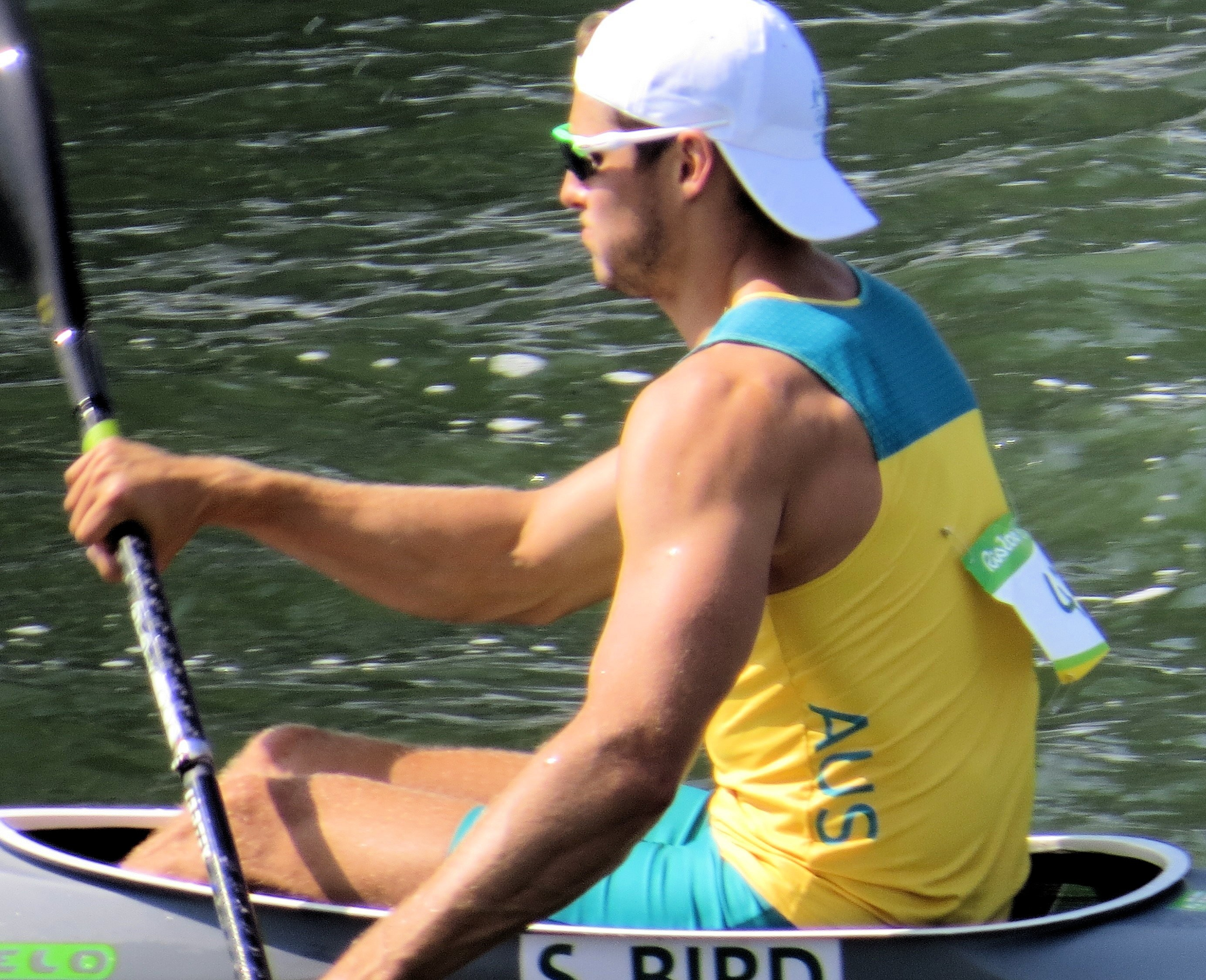
- Bird at the 2016 Olympics

Personal information
- Nationality: Australia
- Born: 11 May 1988 (age 38) Pietermaritzburg, South Africa
- Height: 189 cm (6 ft 2 in)
- Weight: 86 kg (190 lb)

Sport
- Country: Australia
- Sport: Canoeing
- Event: Sprint canoe
- Club: Canning River Canoe Club
- Team: Australia
- Coached by: Ramon Andersson (personal); Jimmy Owens (national)

Achievements and titles
- Olympic finals: 2012, 2016

Stephen Bird (born 11 May 1988) is a South African-born Australian sprint canoeist. He is a three-time national champion (2010, 2011, and 2012) in the men's kayak doubles (200 m), and a member of the Canning River Canoe Club in Perth, Western Australia, under his personal coach Ramon Andersson.

Bird took up canoeing in 1996 in Richmond, South Africa, together with his brother. They used the kayaks left by his uncle, who immigrated to Australia that year. He attended Michaelhouse in KwaZulu-Natal, during which time he was awarded his Protea Blazer for representing South Africa at junior level. In 2007 his family moved to Perth, Western Australia, where he studied commerce and psychology at the Curtin University.

Bird qualified for the men's K-2 200 metres at the 2012 Summer Olympics in London, by placing first from the 2012 ICF Oceania Qualification Tournament in Penrith, New South Wales. Bird and his partner Jesse Phillips finished sixth in the final by four hundredths of a second (0.04) behind the Argentine pair Miguel Correa and Rubén Voisard, with a time of 35.315 seconds.

Bird was the dominant K-1 paddler in the Rio 2016 selection events beating out his partner Jessie Philips, even though Steve and jessie had planned to go to the Olympics in a K2. He would go on to win gold in the 2016 Oceania Championships in Adelaide in February, and again at the 2016 National Sprint Championships the following month. He went through heat three second with a time of 34.584. He went through semi final two second with a time of 34.650. He placed eighth in the A finals at the Rio Olympics with a time of 36.426.
