= Canoeing at the 2011 Pan American Games – Men's K-2 200 metres =

Men's K-2 200 metres at the 2011 Pan American Games
- Venue: Canoe & Rowing Course
- Dates: October 27–29
- Competitors: 22 from 11 nations

Medalists
Gold medal	Ryan Cochrane; Hugues Fournel	Canada
Silver medal	Miguel Correa; Rubén Rézola	Argentina
Bronze medal	Givago Ribeiro; Gilvan Ribeiro	Brazil

The men's K-2 200 metres canoeing event at the 2011 Pan American Games was held on October 27–29 at the Canoe & Rowing Course in Ciudad Guzman.

== Schedule ==
All times are local Central Daylight Time (UTC−5)

Date	Time	Round
October 27, 2011	12:45	Heats
October 27, 2011	13:35	Semifinal
October 29, 2011	10:45	Final

== Results ==
=== Heats ===
Qualification Rules: 1..3->Final, 4..7 and 8th best time->Semifinals, Rest Out

==== Heat 1 ====
Rank	Athletes	Country	Time	Notes
1	Ryan Cochrane, Hugues Fournel	Canada	31.928	QF
2	Gilvan Ribeiro, Givago Ribeiro	Brazil	33.237	QF
3	Jesus Colmenares, José Ramos	Venezuela	34.073	QF
4	Santos Marroquín, Agustin Medinilla	Mexico	34.171	QS
5	Richard Giron, Kevin Rivas	Guatemala	39.842	QS

==== Heat 2 ====
Rank	Athletes	Country	Time	Notes
1	Miguel Correa, Rubén Rézola	Argentina	32.218	QF
2	Ryan Dolan, Timothy Hornsby	United States	32.891	QF
3	Reinier Mora, Fidel Antonio Vargas	Cuba	32.909	QF
4	Victor Baron, Jimmy Urrego	Colombia	34.836	QS
5	Yauntung Cueva, César de Cesare	Ecuador	44.848	QS
6	Krishna Angueira, Edgar Padro	Puerto Rico	49.097	QS

=== Semifinal ===
Qualification Rules: 1..3->Final, Rest Out

Rank	Athletes	Country	Time	Notes
1	Santos Marroquín, Agustin Medinilla	Mexico	35.374	QF
2	Victor Baron, Jimmy Urrego	Colombia	36.386	QF
3	Yauntung Cueva, César de Cesare	Ecuador	36.519	QF
4	Krishna Angueira, Edgar Padro	Puerto Rico	37.375	
5	Richard Giron, Kevin Rivas	Guatemala	38.318	

=== Final ===
Rank	Rowers	Country	Time	Notes
1st place, gold medalist(s)	Ryan Cochrane, Hugues Fournel	Canada	32.375	
2nd place, silver medalist(s)	Miguel Correa, Rubén Rézola	Argentina	32.494	
3rd place, bronze medalist(s)	Gilvan Ribeiro, Givago Ribeiro	Brazil	32.902	
4	Reinier Mora, Fidel Antonio Vargas	Cuba	33.280	
5	Ryan Dolan, Timothy Hornsby	United States	33.403	
6	Santos Marroquín, Agustin Medinilla	Mexico	34.588	
7	Yauntung Cueva, César de Cesare	Ecuador	34.658	
8	Jesus Colmenares, José Ramos	Venezuela	34.779	
9	Victor Baron, Jimmy Urrego	Colombia	34.801	
