= The Ageev Brothers and Olympic Champions Iurii Postrigai and Alexander Dyachenko completions in canoeing =

Kayak- and canoe-racing event

The Ageev Brothers and Olympic Champions Iurii Postrigai and Alexander Dyachenko completions in canoeing (AAACUP) is an annual international kayak- and canoe-racing event held in Russia since 2001. As of 2020, the AAACUP is included into the official calendar of the International Canoe Federation (ICF). The AAACUP incorporates the All-Russian Canoeing and Kayaking Competition included into the events calendar of the Russian Ministry of Sports.

== History ==
The event was started by two brothers, Alexander Ageev and Andrey Ageev, and was initially known as the Ageev Brothers Cup. The first Ageev Brothers Cup was held in 2001 in Volzhsky, 20 kilometres northeast of Volgograd in Russia. Around two hundred young kayakers and canoeists from the nearby towns took part in the races. They competed in singles and doubles set over two distances, 200 and 500 metres.

The Cup was held in Volzhsky every year until 2016. More than 5,000 athletes competed for 800 sets of medals.

In 2017, the Ageev brothers were joined by Olympic champions Iurii Postrigai and Alexander Dyachenko, and the event moved to Moscow. It has become an international competition known as the AAACUP or The Ageev Brothers and Olympic Champions Iurii Postrigai and Alexander Dyachenko completions in canoeing.

4 Olympic champions, 10 Olympic medallists and many World and European champions and medallists have taken part in the annual races.

The 2020 prize fund of the AAACUP was €150,000.

More than 1,200 athletes competed in the AAACUP races in 2020.

== Programme (disciplines) of AAACUP ==
- SUPERSPRINT race
- 4x200-meter relay in singles
- Mixed 4x200-meter relay in doubles
- SUP 200-meter race
- SUPERFORCE race
- Demonstration races

The All-Russian competition within the AAACUP is held in C2, C4, K2 and K4 in the following age groups:

- 13–14 years old (under 15)
- 15–16 years old (under 17)
- 17–18 years old (under 19)
