= Bogdan Mada =

Romanian canoeist

Personal information
- Nationality: Romanian
- Born: 14 February 1989 (age 37) Timișoara, Romania
- Height: 1.82 m (5 ft 11 1/2 in)
- Weight: 91 kg (201 lb)

Sport
- Sport: Canoeing
- Event: Sprint canoe
- Club: CSA Steaua București
- Coached by: Florin Scoica

Bogdan Mada (born 14 February 1989 in Timișoara) is a Romanian sprint canoeist. Mada is a member of the canoe and kayak team for Steaua Army Sports Club in Bucharest (Romanian: Clubul Sportiv al Armatei Steaua București), and is coached and trained by Florin Scoica.

Mada qualified for the men's K-2 200 metres at the 2012 Summer Olympics in London, by finishing fourth from the 2011 ICF Canoe Sprint World Championships in Szeged, Hungary. Mada and his partner Ionuț Mitrea paddled to a fifth-place finish and thirteenth overall in the B-final by approximately ten seconds behind the Belgian pair Olivier Cauwenbergh and Laurens Pannecoucke, recording their slowest time of 46.495 seconds.
