= Uroš Mitjev =

Serbian canoeist

Medal record

Men's canoe sprint

Representing Serbia

World U23 Championships
Silver medal – second place	2013 Welland	K-2 200 m

European U23 Championships
Silver medal – second place	2013 Poznań	K-2 200 m

Uroš Mitjev (born 23 June 1993 in Šabac) is a Serbian sprint canoer. He is a member of canoe club Zorka in Šabac. He won three medals in 2013:

1. Silver medal on European U23 canoe sprint championship in Poznan, Poland (k2 200m)
2. Silver medal on World U23 championship in Welland, Canada (k2 200m)
3. Bronze medal on World Cup I, Szeged, Hungary (k2 200m)

His partner is Nebojša Grujić (1991), also member of canoe sprint club Zorka from Šabac. They have been competing together since 2012, and their first results were:

1. 1st and gold medal on International Regata Piestany, Slovakia in k2 200m U23
2. 1st place in B final on European U23 canoe sprint championship in Montemor-O-Velho, Portugal
3. 1st place and gold medal in State Championship in Backa Palanka, Serbia in K2 200m

Mitjev is 185 centimetres (6 ft 1 in) tall and weighs 83 kilograms (183 lb). He currently lives in Novi Sad and he is also student of medical faculty in University of Novi Sad.
