= Levente Apagyi =

Hungarian canoeist (born 1993)

Personal information
- Nationality: Hungarian
- Born: 18 December 1993 (age 32) Budapest, Hungary

Sport
- Country: Hungary
- Sport: Sprint kayak
- Event: K-2 200 m
- Club: AVSE
Medal record
Men's canoe sprint
Representing Hungary
World Championships
Bronze medal – third place	2019 Szeged	K-2 200 m

Levente Apagyi (born 18 December 1993) is a Hungarian sprint canoeist.

He won a medal at the 2019 ICF Canoe Sprint World Championships.
