= 2019 ICF Canoe Sprint World Championships – Men's K-2 200 metres =

Men's K-2 200 metres at the 2019 ICF Canoe Sprint World Championships
- Venue: Olympic Centre of Szeged
- Location: Szeged, Hungary
- Dates: 23–25 August
- Competitors: 42 from 21 nations
- Winning time: 33.05

Medalists
gold medal	Yury Postrigay; Alexander Dyachenko	Russia
silver medal	Piotr Mazur; Bartosz Grabowski	Poland
bronze medal	Márk Balaska; Levente Apagyi	Hungary

The men's K-2 200 metres competition at the 2019 ICF Canoe Sprint World Championships in Szeged took place at the Olympic Centre of Szeged.

== Schedule ==
The schedule was as follows:

Date	Time	Round
Friday 23 August 2019	11:20	Heats
Saturday 24 August 2019	16:50	Semifinals
Sunday 25 August 2019	10:15	Final B
Sunday 25 August 2019	12:45	Final A

All times are Central European Summer Time (UTC+2)

== Results ==
=== Heats ===
Heat winners advanced directly to the A final.
The next six fastest boats in each heat advanced to the semifinals.

==== Heat 1 ====
Rank	Kayakers	Country	Time	Notes
1	Márk Balaska; Levente Apagyi	Hungary	31.59	QA
2	Stelian Naftanaila; Trevor Thomson	Great Britain	33.04	QS
3	Sebastian Delgado; Matias Otero	Uruguay	33.99	QS
4	Filip Šváb; Ondřej Bišický	Czech Republic	34.04	QS
5	Sunny Kumar; Atul Kumar	India	36.25	QS
6	Tsoi Yik San; Mok Yuen Fung	Hong Kong	39.87	QS
7	Hayk Tadevosyan; Artur Akishin	Armenia	40.49	QS

==== Heat 2 ====
Rank	Kayakers	Country	Time	Notes
1	Piotr Mazur; Bartosz Grabowski	Poland	32.01	QA
2	Juan Oriyés; Daniel Abad	Spain	32.09	QS
3	Aurélien Le Gall; Franck Le Moël	France	32.61	QS
4	Edvards Ceipe; Kristaps Laube	Latvia	35.37	QS
5	Oussama Djabali; Ayoub Haidra	Algeria	38.93	QS
6	Brilend Chutra; Idealj Leshi	North Macedonia	41.93	QS
–	Pita Taufatofua; Malakai Ahokava	Tonga	DNF	

==== Heat 3 ====
Rank	Kayakers	Country	Time	Notes
1	Yury Postrigay; Alexander Dyachenko	Russia	31.85	QA
2	Kostja Stroinski; Timo Haseleu	Germany	32.63	QS
3	Aleksandr Senkevych; Dmytro Kostyshen	Ukraine	32.79	QS
4	Ali Hassan; Momen Mahran	Egypt	35.85	QS
5	Adam Aris; Khairul Naim Zainal	Malaysia	36.97	QS
6	Miles Cross-Whiter; Alexander Lee	United States	37.11	QS
7	Tohir Nurmuhammadi; Zohirjon Nabiev	Tajikistan	38.92	QS

=== Semifinals ===
Qualification was as follows:

The fastest three boats in each semi advanced to the A final.
The next four fastest boats in each semi, plus the fastest remaining boat advanced to the B final.

==== Semifinal 1 ====
Rank	Kayakers	Country	Time	Notes
1	Aurélien Le Gall; Franck Le Moël	France	32.83	QA
2	Aleksandr Senkevych; Dmytro Kostyshen	Ukraine	33.30	QA
3	Filip Šváb; Ondřej Bišický	Czech Republic	33.40	QA
4	Stelian Naftanaila; Trevor Thomson	Great Britain	33.73	QB
5	Miles Cross-Whiter; Alexander Lee	United States	34.75	QB
6	Ali Hassan; Momen Mahran	Egypt	36.30	QB
7	Tsoi Yik San; Mok Yuen Fung	Hong Kong	42.06	QB
–	Oussama Djabali; Ayoub Haidra	Algeria	DNS	

==== Semifinal 2 ====
Rank	Kayakers	Country	Time	Notes
1	Juan Oriyés; Daniel Abad	Spain	32.89	QA
2	Kostja Stroinski; Timo Haseleu	Germany	32.91	QA
3	Sebastian Delgado; Matias Otero	Uruguay	35.01	QA
4	Edvards Ceipe; Kristaps Laube	Latvia	35.41	QB
5	Adam Aris; Khairul Naim Zainal	Malaysia	37.43	QB
6	Sunny Kumar; Atul Kumar	India	37.44	QB
7	Tohir Nurmuhammadi; Zohirjon Nabiev	Tajikistan	39.14	QB
8	Hayk Tadevosyan; Artur Akishin	Armenia	39.72	qB
9	Brilend Chutra; Idealj Leshi	North Macedonia	42.91	

=== Finals ===
==== Final B ====
Competitors in this final raced for positions 10 to 18.

Rank	Kayakers	Country	Time
1	Stelian Naftanaila; Trevor Thomson	Great Britain	35.29
2	Miles Cross-Whiter; Alexander Lee	United States	35.49
3	Ali Hassan; Momen Mahran	Egypt	36.79
4	Edvards Ceipe; Kristaps Laube	Latvia	36.85
5	Sunny Kumar; Atul Kumar	India	38.43
6	Adam Aris; Khairul Naim Zainal	Malaysia	38.92
7	Tohir Nurmuhammadi; Zohirjon Nabiev	Tajikistan	40.63
8	Hayk Tadevosyan; Artur Akishin	Armenia	41.37
9	Tsoi Yik San; Mok Yuen Fung	Hong Kong	41.80

==== Final A ====
Competitors raced for positions 1 to 9, with medals going to the top three.

Rank	Kayakers	Country	Time
1st place, gold medalist(s)	Yury Postrigay; Alexander Dyachenko	Russia	33.05
2nd place, silver medalist(s)	Piotr Mazur; Bartosz Grabowski	Poland	33.10
3rd place, bronze medalist(s)	Márk Balaska; Levente Apagyi	Hungary	33.30
4	Kostja Stroinski; Timo Haseleu	Germany	33.32
5	Juan Oriyés; Daniel Abad	Spain	33.42
6	Aurélien Le Gall; Franck Le Moël	France	33.45
7	Aleksandr Senkevych; Dmytro Kostyshen	Ukraine	34.11
8	Filip Šváb; Ondřej Bišický	Czech Republic	34.49
9	Sebastian Delgado; Matias Otero	Uruguay	35.83
