= Ionuț Mitrea =

Romanian canoeist

Ionuţ Mitrea
Personal information
- Full name: Ionuţ Alexandru Mitrea
- Nationality: Romania
- Born: 18 January 1990 (age 36) Bucharest, Romania
- Height: 1.91 m (6 ft 3 in)
- Weight: 63 kg (139 lb)

Sport
- Sport: Canoeing
- Event: Sprint canoe
- Club: CS Dinamo București
- Coached by: Serban Romica

Ionuţ Alexandru Mitrea (Romanian pronunciation: [joˈnuts alekˈsandru ˈmitre̯a]; born 18 January 1990 in Bucharest) is a Romanian sprint canoeist. Mitrea is a member of the canoe and kayak team for Dynamo Bucharest Sports Club, and is coached and trained by Serban Romica.

Mitrea qualified for the men's K-2 200 metres at the 2012 Summer Olympics in London, by finishing fourth from the 2011 ICF Canoe Sprint World Championships in Szeged, Hungary. Mitrea and his partner Bogdan Mada paddled to a fifth-place finish and thirteenth overall in the B-final by approximately ten seconds behind the Belgian pair Olivier Cauwenbergh and Laurens Pannecoucke, recording their slowest time of 46.495 seconds.
