= Arnaud Hybois =

French canoeist (born 1982)

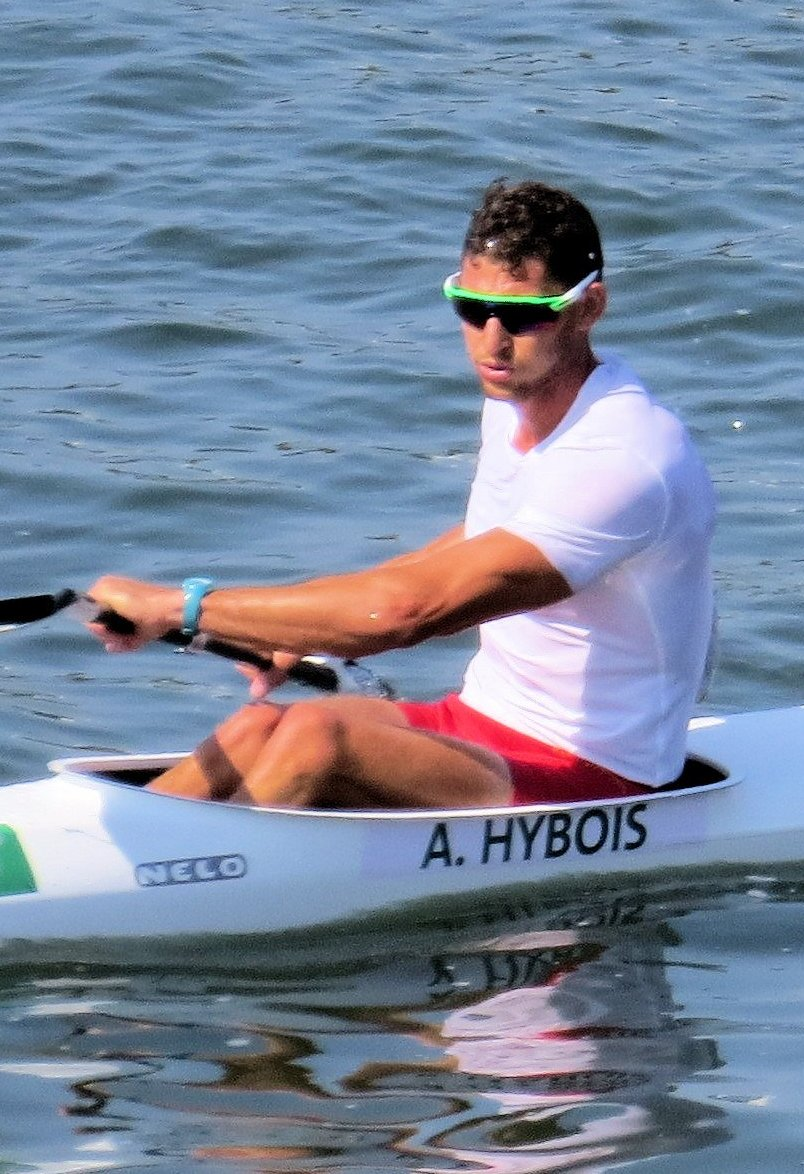
- Hybois at the 2016 Summer Olympics.

Medal record

Men's canoe sprint

Representing France

World Championships
Gold medal – first place	2010 Poznań	K-2 200 m
Gold medal – first place	2010 Poznań	K-4 1000 m
Gold medal – first place	2011 Szeged	K-2 200 m
Silver medal – second place	2014 Moscow	K-1 4x200 m
Bronze medal – third place	2009 Dartmouth	K-1 4 x 200 m
Bronze medal – third place	2013 Duisburg	K–1 500 m

European Championships
Gold medal – first place	2012 Zagreb	K-2 500 m
Silver medal – second place	2014 Brandenburg	K-2 1000 m

Arnaud Hybois (born 26 January 1982 in Pontivy) is a French sprint canoeist who has competed since the late 2000s. He has won six medals at the ICF Canoe Sprint World Championships with three golds (K-2 200 m, K-4 1000 m: both 2010 and K-2 200 m in 2011), a silver (K-1 4 x 200 m, 2014) and two bronze (K-1 4 x 200 m: 2009, K-1 500 m 2013).

Hybois also competed in the K-1 500 m event at the 2008 Summer Olympics in Beijing, but was eliminated in the semifinals. At the 2012 Summer Olympics, he and Sebastien Jouve came 4th in the K2-200 m.
