= Márk Balaska =

Hungarian canoeist (born 1996)

Personal information
- Nationality: Hungarian
- Born: 25 September 1996 (age 29)

Sport
- Country: Hungary
- Sport: Sprint kayak
- Event: K-2 200 m
- Club: BHSE
Medal record
Men's canoe sprint
Representing Hungary
World Championships
Gold medal – first place	2017 Račice	K-2 200 m
Gold medal – first place	2018 Montemor-o-Velho	K-2 200 m
Bronze medal – third place	2019 Szeged	K-2 200 m
European Championships
Gold medal – first place	2017 Plovdiv	K-2 200 m
Bronze medal – third place	2018 Belgrade	K-2 200 m

Márk Balaska (born 25 September 1996) is a Hungarian sprint canoeist.

He participated at the 2018 ICF Canoe Sprint World Championships.
