= Marko Novaković =

Serbian canoeist (born 1989)

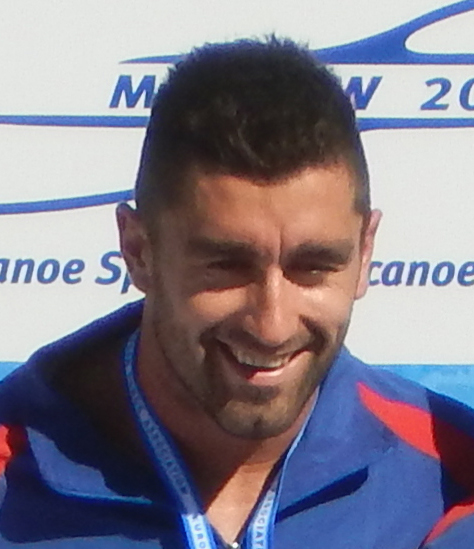

Personal information
- Born: 4 January 1989 (age 37) Bečej, SR Serbia, Yugoslavia
- Height: 1.86 m (6 ft 1 in)
- Weight: 95 kg (209 lb)

Sport
- Country: Serbia
- Sport: Canoe sprint
- Club: KKK Zmaj Zemun
Medal record
Men's canoe sprint
Representing Serbia
World Championships
Gold medal – first place	2014 Moscow	K-2 200 m
Silver medal – second place	2015 Milan	K-2 200 m
Bronze medal – third place	2017 Račice	K-2 200 m
Bronze medal – third place	2018 Montemor-o-Velho	K-2 200 m
European Championships
Gold medal – first place	2012 Zagreb	K-1 200 m
Gold medal – first place	2016 Moscow	K-2 200 m
Silver medal – second place	2015 Račice	K-2 200 m
Silver medal – second place	2018 Belgrade	K-2 200 m
European Games
Gold medal – first place	2015 Baku	K-2 200 m
Bronze medal – third place	2023 Kraków-Małopolska	K-4 500 m
European U23 Championships
Bronze medal – third place	2011 Zagreb	K-1 200 m

Marko Novaković (Serbian Cyrillic: Марко Новаковић, born 4 January 1989) is a Serbian sprint canoer.

Novaković won a gold medal in the K-1 200 m event at the 2012 Canoe Sprint European Championships in Zagreb, and the K-2 200 m in 2016. He also won silver in that event in 2015. Novaković won another gold medal in the K-2 200 m event category at the 2014 World Championships, and bronze in that event at the 2015 World Championships. He is managed by former Serbian canoer Jozef Soti.
