= Sébastien Jouve =

French canoeist (born 1982)

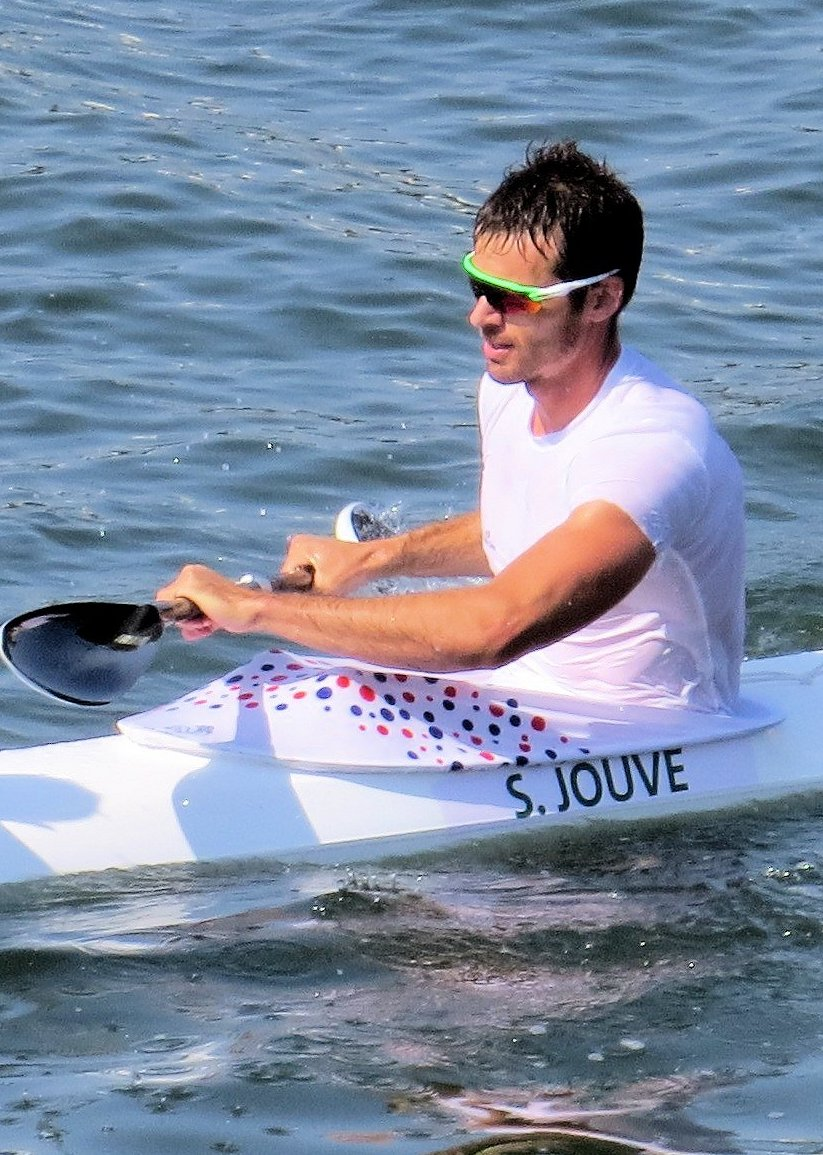
- Jouve at the 2016 Summer Olympics

Personal information
- Born: 8 December 1982 (age 43) Mont-Saint-Aignan, France
- Height: 190 cm (6 ft 3 in)
- Weight: 86 kg (190 lb)
Medal record
Men's canoe sprint
Representing France
World Championships
Gold medal – first place	2010 Poznań	K-2 200 m
Gold medal – first place	2010 Poznań	K-4 1000 m
Gold medal – first place	2011 Szeged	K-2 200 m
Silver medal – second place	2009 Dartmouth	K-4 1000 m
Silver medal – second place	2014 Moscow	K-1 4x200 m
Bronze medal – third place	2009 Dartmouth	K-1 4x200 m
Bronze medal – third place	2013 Duisburg	K–2 500 m
Bronze medal – third place	2014 Moscow	K-2 200 m
European Championships
Gold medal – first place	2012 Zagreb	K-2 500 m
Silver medal – second place	2014 Brandenburg	K-2 500 m
Bronze medal – third place	2013 Montemor-o-Velho	K-2 200 m

Sébastien Jouve (born 8 December 1982 in Mont-Saint-Aignan) is a French sprint canoeist who has competed since the late 2000s. He won eight medals at the ICF Canoe Sprint World Championships with three golds (K-2 200 m, K-4 1000 m: both 2010, K-2 200m: 2011), two silvers (K-4 1000 m: 2009, K-1 4 x 200m: 2014), and three bronzes (K-1 4 x 200 m: 2009, K-2 500 m: 2013, K-2 200m: 2014).

Jouve also finished seventh in the K-2 500 m event at the 2008 Summer Olympics in Beijing and also competed at the 2012 Summer Olympics where he came fourth in the .K-2 200 m with Arnaud Hybois.
