= Cristian Toro =

Spanish canoeist

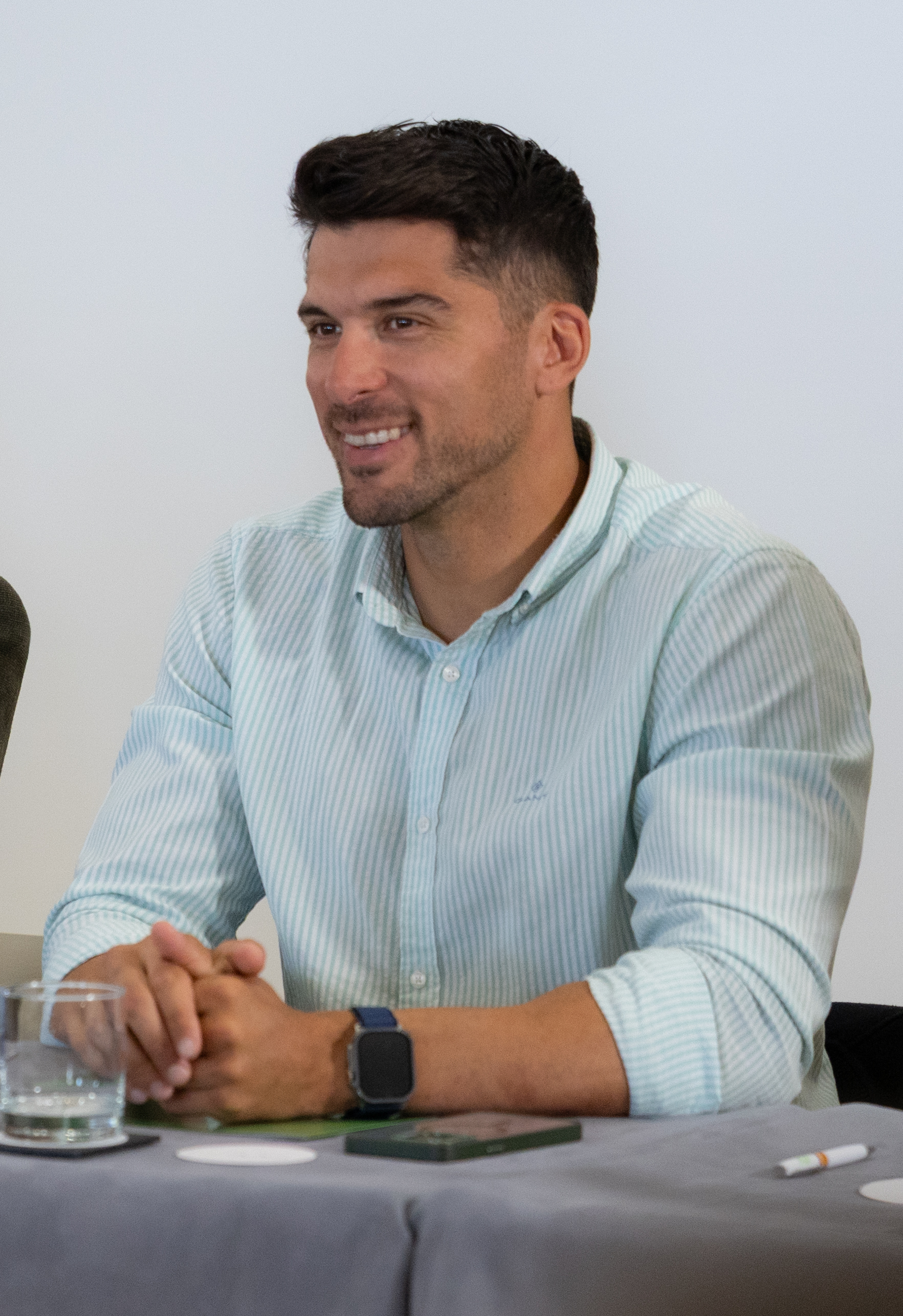

Personal information
- Full name: Cristian Isaac Toro Carballo
- Nationality: Spanish
- Born: 29 April 1992 (age 34) La Asunción, Venezuela
- Height: 1.88 m (6 ft 2 in)
- Weight: 90 kg (198 lb)

Sport
- Country: Spain
- Sport: Canoe sprint
- Club: Club Fluvial de Lugo
Medal record
Men's canoe sprint
Representing Spain
Olympic Games
Gold medal – first place	2016 Rio de Janeiro	K-2 200 m
World Championships
Silver medal – second place	2017 Račice	K-2 200 m
Silver medal – second place	2017 Račice	K-4 500 m
Silver medal – second place	2018 Montemor-o-Velho	K-2 200 m
Silver medal – second place	2018 Montemor-o-Velho	K-4 500 m

Cristian Isaac Toro Carballo (born 29 April 1992) is a Spanish canoeist. He competed in the men's K-2 200 metres event at the 2016 Summer Olympics with Saúl Craviotto and won the gold medal.

He was born in Venezuela. Shortly afterwards, he moved to Spain with his maternal family, settling in the province of Lugo, in Galicia. Specifically, the family established themselves in Viveiro, where he began practising canoeing.

He graduated in Physiotherapy from the Universidad Católica San Antonio de Murcia. He later appeared as a participant on the dating programme Mujeres y Hombres y Viceversa, broadcast on Telecinco. In 2023, he was included on the electoral list of Vox for the municipal election in Madrid.
