= Yury Postrigay =

Russian canoeist (born 1988)

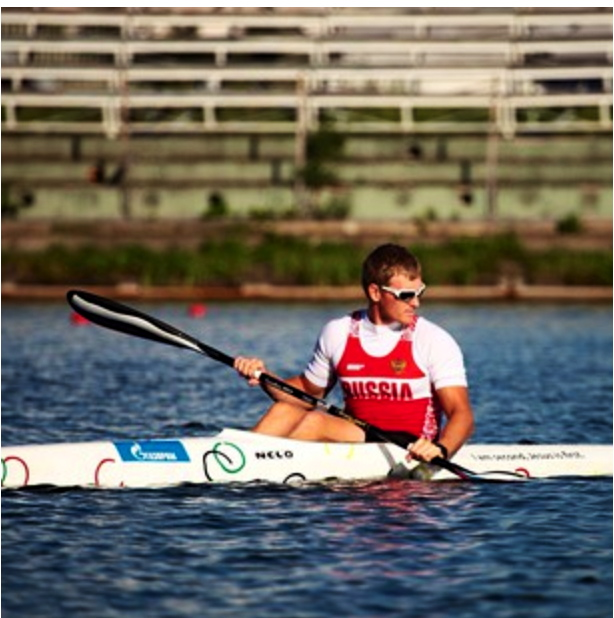

Personal information
- Nationality: Russian
- Born: 31 August 1988 (age 38) Sverdlovsk, Russian SFSR, Soviet Union
- Height: 1.85 m (6 ft 1 in)
- Weight: 82 kg (181 lb)

Sport
- Country: Russia
- Sport: Sprint kayak
- Events: K–1 200 m, K–1 500 m, K-2 200 m, K-2 500 m
- Club: Krylatskoye Centre of Sports Preparation
- Partner: Alexander Dyachenko

Achievements and titles
- Olympic finals: 2012 London
Medal record
Men's canoe sprint
Representing Russia
Olympic Games
Gold medal – first place	2012 London	K-2 200 m
World Championships
Gold medal – first place	2013 Duisburg	K–2 200 m
Gold medal – first place	2019 Szeged	K-2 200 m
Silver medal – second place	2013 Duisburg	K–1 200 m Relay
Bronze medal – third place	2011 Szeged	K–1 500 m
European Championships
Gold medal – first place	2011 Belgrade	K-1 500 m
Gold medal – first place	2013 Montemor-o-Velho	K-2 200 m
Bronze medal – third place	2018 Belgrade	K-2 500 m
Bronze medal – third place	2014 Brandenburg	K-1 200 m
Bronze medal – third place	2021 Poznań	K-2 200 m
Universiade
Gold medal – first place	2013 Kazan	K-2 200 m

Yury Viktorovich Postrigay (Russian: Ю́рий Ви́кторович Пострига́й; born 31 August 1988) is a Russian canoeist, who won Men's K-2 200 metres Gold Medal in the 2012 Summer Olympics with Alexander Dyachenko.
