= Hugues Fournel =

Canadian kayaker

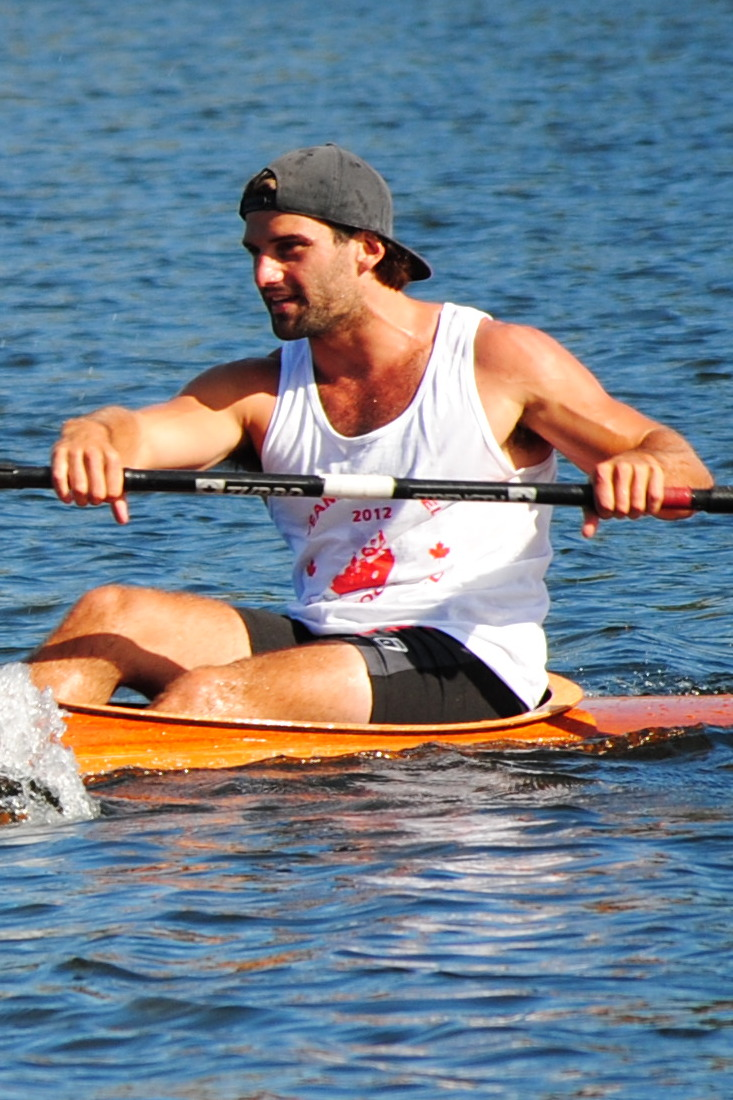
- Fournel at the 2012 National Olympic Trials

Personal information
- Nationality: Canadian
- Born: 5 August 1988 (age 38) Lachine, Quebec, Canada
- Height: 1.70 m (5 ft 7 in)
- Weight: 77 kg (170 lb)

Sport
- Sport: Kayaking
Medal record
Men's Kayaking
Representing Canada
Pan American Games
| Gold medal – first place | 2011 Guadalajara | K-2 200 metres |
- Updated on July 2012

Hugues Fournel (born 5 August 1988) is a Canadian kayaker. He was born in Lachine, Quebec. Fournel was the 2011 Pan American champion in the men's K-2 200 m together with Ryan Cochrane. He competed in K-2 200 and 1000 m together with Cochrane at the 2012 Summer Olympics in London.

On August 1, 2016 (after the suspension of the Russian crew) he and Cochrane was named to Canada's 2016 Olympic team in the men's K-2 200 m event. They finished last in the final.

His father Jean and sister Emilie are also both Olympic kayakers.
