= Olivier Cauwenbergh =

Belgian canoeist (born 1987)

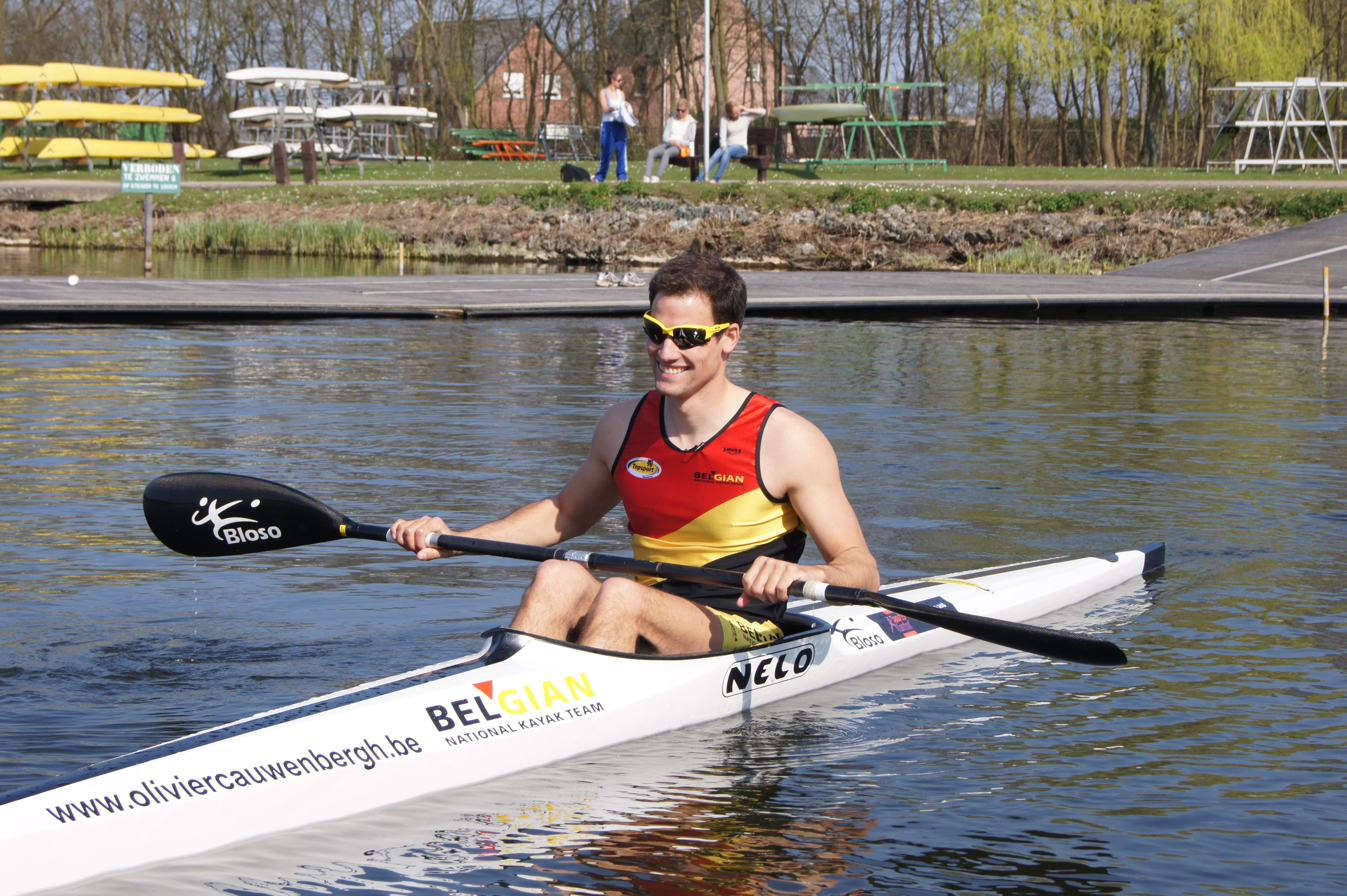
- Olivier Cauwenbergh in 2012

Personal information
- Nationality: Belgium
- Born: 15 March 1987 (age 39) Mechelen, Belgium
- Height: 1.71 m (5 ft 7 1/2 in)
- Weight: 70 kg (154 lb)

Sport
- Sport: Canoeing
- Event: Sprint canoe
- Club: KCC Mechelen
- Coached by: Carlos Prendes

Olivier Cauwenbergh (born 15 March 1987) is a Belgian sprint canoeist. Cauwenbergh is a member of Royal Canoe Club Mechelen (Dutch: Koninklijke Cano Club Mechelen), and thus is coached and trained by Carlos Prendes.

Cauwenbergh qualified for the men's K-2 1000 metres at the 2012 Summer Olympics in London, by finishing fourth from the 2011 ICF Canoe Sprint World Championships in Szeged, Hungary. Cauwenbergh and his partner Laurens Pannecoucke paddled to a second-place finish and tenth overall in the B-final by forty-seven hundredths of a second (0.47) behind the winning Danish pair Kim Wraae Knudsen and Emil Stær Simensen, posting their best Olympic time of 3:13.298. Three days later, the Belgian pair edged out Romania's Ionuț Mitrea and Bogdan Mada for fourth place by ten seconds, in the B-final of the men's K-2 200 metres, clocking at 36.336 seconds.
