= Jon Schofield (canoeist) =

British canoeist

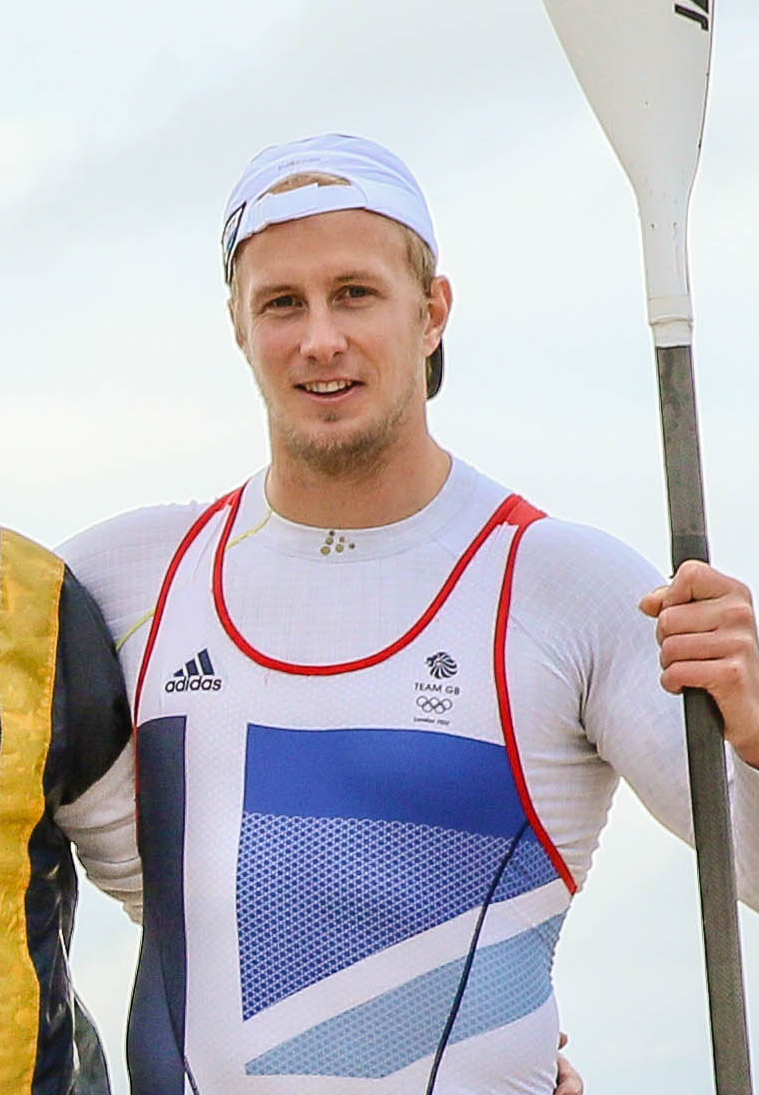

Personal information
- Nationality: British
- Born: Jonathan Schofield; 10 May 1985 (age 41) Petersfield, Hampshire, England
- Height: 1.82 m (6 ft 0 in)
- Weight: 82 kg (181 lb)

Sport
- Country: United Kingdom
- Sport: Canoeing
- Event: Canoe sprint
- Coached by: Alex Nikonorov
Medal record
Representing Great Britain
Men's canoe sprint
Olympic Games
Silver medal – second place	2016 Rio de Janeiro	K-2 200 m
Bronze medal – third place	2012 London	K-2 200 m
World Championships
Silver medal – second place	2010 Poznań	K-1 4×200 m
Silver medal – second place	2011 Szeged	K-2 200 m
Silver medal – second place	2013 Duisburg	K-2 200 m
Bronze medal – third place	2010 Poznań	K-2 200 m
Bronze medal – third place	2014 Moscow	K-1 4×200 m
European Championships
Gold medal – first place	2010 Trasona	K-2 200 m
Gold medal – first place	2011 Belgrade	K-2 200 m
Gold medal – first place	2012 Zagreb	K-2 200 m
Bronze medal – third place	2014 Brandenburg	K-2 200 m

Jon Schofield (born 10 May 1985) is a British canoeist. He partnered with Liam Heath in the men's kayak double 200m sprint event, and they have won a bronze in K-2 200 at the 2012 Summer Olympics, and a silver at the 2016 Summer Olympics in the same event. They have also won gold at the European Championships three times as well as silver and bronze medals at the World Championships.

== Early life and education ==
Schofield was born in Petersfield, Hampshire to Maggie and Peter Schofield. The family moved to Spain when he was six, where he took up taekwondo and later judo. After coming back to Clitheroe, Lancashire, he was introduced to canoeing when he was nine in a taster session through the Chatburn Cubs. He initially competed in the cub scout racing league, later he took up wildwater racing.

Schofield attended Clitheroe Royal Grammar School from 1996 to 2003. He studied Human Biology at Loughborough University, but took two years out in an attempt to get to the 2008 Beijing Games. He graduated in June 2010. and He also has an MSc in Applied Physiotherapy and Biomechanics from Brunel University. He resides in Maidenhead, Berkshire.

== Career ==
Schofield was active in wild water canoeing as a junior, and made it into the national junior team. He won the Junior World Championships in Bala, North Wales in 2002. He was the overall World Cup winner in 2006. He became European champion in 2007.

Schofield switched to flatwater sprint in 2007 as wild-water sprint canoeing events are not part of the Olympic Games, and he considered becoming an Olympic champion his ultimate goal. In the flatwater sprint kayaking discipline, he competed with Ben Brown in the 500m K2 at the 2007 World Championships, but in finishing in 9th place, they failed to qualify for the 2008 Beijing Olympics.

Schofield was a member of the Soar Valley Canoe Club and coached by Alex Nikonorov.

=== 2010–2011 ===
Schofield partnered up with Liam Heath in the sprint double event after Heath decided to return to the sport in 2009. In their first season competing together in 2010 they won gold medals in the K2 200m at the 2nd World Cup in Szeged and the 3rd World Cup in Duisburg and became European Champions in July 2010. They won two medals at the 2010 ICF Canoe Sprint World Championships in Poznań with a silver in the K-1 4 × 200 m relay and a bronze in the K-2 200m event.

In the 2011 international season Schofield and Heath won two silver medals at World Cups 1 and 2 at Poznan and Račice and retained their K2 200m title at the European Championships in Belgrade in June 2011. At the ICF Canoe Sprint World Championships in Szeged in August they won the silver medal, thereby gaining qualification for the GB K2 boat in the Men's 200m event at the 2012 Olympics. A fortnight after the World Championships Heath and Schofield took part in the London Invitational Olympic Canoe Sprint test event at Eton-Dorney where they won the bronze medal in the K2 200m. At the end of 2011 Liam and Jon received Olympic Athlete of the Year award in canoeing from the British Olympic Association.

=== 2012 ===
At the National Regatta in Nottingham in April 2012, Schofield and Heath met GB Canoeing's K2 200m nomination criteria to compete in the 2012 Summer Olympiad. They won silver medals in World Cup 1 in Poznan and World Cup 2 in Duisburg and were part of the four-man GB 200m relay team that won the gold medal in Duisburg. Schofield and Heath formally became members of Team GB on 14 June 2012. A week later, at the European Canoe Sprint Championships in Zagreb they won the K2 200m title for the third year in a row.

Representing Great Britain at the 2012 Summer Olympics in the Men's K-2 200 metres, he and Liam Heath finished 2nd in their heat, 4th overall, qualifying for the semifinals. They won the bronze in the kayak K2 200m final after being edged out of the silver by the Belarus team.

=== 2013–2015 ===
During the 2013 international canoe sprint season Schofield and Heath won the K2 200m silver medals at the first two World Cup regattas in Szeged and Racice respectively but missed out on a medal when they came 4th at the European Championships in Montemor-o-Velho, Portugal. Two months later at the World Championships in Duisburg the pair came second behind the Russians Postrigay and Dyachenko and were part of the fourth placed GB men's 4 × 200 m team.

At the British Canoe Union's National Canoe Sprint Championships in April 2014, Schofield and Heath won the K2 200m title. At World Cup 3 in Szeged Schofield and Heath won silver. Schofield won a bronze medal with Heath, Ed McKeever and Kristian Reeves in the Men's K1 4 × 200m relay in Moscow.

In April 2015, the duo won the K2 200m selection races at the BCU Canoe Sprint Regatta at Holme Pierrepont, Nottingham. At World Cup 2 in Duisburg, they won bronze, followed by a gold in and at World Cup 3 in Copenhagen. At the World Championship in Milan in August, Schofield and Heath came 5th, thereby qualifying Team GB to enter a boat in the Men's K2 200m event at the 2016 Olympics.

=== 2016 ===
At the Olympic Selection event for canoe sprint in April 2016 in Nottingham, Heath and Schofield won the K2 200m race and set a new course record, thereby guaranteeing their nomination to the BOC to compete at the Rio Olympics.

At the 2016 Summer Olympics, Schofield and Heath won the silver K-2 200 event, finishing behind Spain.

The K-2 200m event was dropped for the 2020 Tokyo Olympics, Schofield therefore focused his attention on the single Kayak events in the following seasons.

=== Retirement ===
In March 2019, Schofield announced that he would be retiring that year to take up a post in Scotland as Head of Performance and Pathways at the Scottish Canoe Association in June.
