= Laurens Pannecoucke =

Belgian canoeist (born 1988)

Personal information
- Nationality: Belgium
- Born: 19 July 1988 (age 38) Kortrijk, Belgium
- Height: 1.82 m (5 ft 11 1/2 in)
- Weight: 82 kg (181 lb)

Sport
- Sport: Canoeing
- Event: Sprint canoe
- Club: Bloso Hazewinkel
- Coached by: Carlos Prendes

Laurens Pannecoucke (/ˈpɑːnəˌkuːkə/; born 19 July 1988) is a Belgian sprint canoeist. Pannecoucke is a member of the canoe and kayak team for Bloso Hazewinkel Sports Club in Willebroek, and is coached and trained by Carlos Prendes.

Pannecoucke qualified for the men's K-2 1000 metres at the 2012 Summer Olympics in London, by finishing fourth from the 2011 ICF Canoe Sprint World Championships in Szeged, Hungary. Pannecoucke and his partner Olivier Cauwenbergh paddled to a second-place finish and tenth overall in the B-final by forty-seven hundredths of a second (0.47) behind the winning Danish pair Kim Wraae Knudsen and Emil Stær Simensen, posting their best Olympic time of 3:13.298. Three days later, the Belgian pair edged out Romania's Ionuț Mitrea and Bogdan Mada for fourth place by ten seconds, in the B-final of the men's K-2 200 metres, clocking at 36.336 seconds. The pair also competed in the K-2 200 m at the 2012 Summer Olympics.
