= Aurimas Lankas =

Lithuanian canoe sprinter (born 1985)

Personal information
- Nationality: Lithuanian
- Born: 7 September 1985 (age 40) Šiauliai, Lithuanian SSR, Soviet Union
- Home town: Šiauliai, Lithuania
- Height: 1.79 m (5 ft 10 in)
- Weight: 88 kg (194 lb)

Sport
- Sport: Canoe sprint
- Events: K-2 200 m, K-4 500 m
- Club: Irklo Broliai
- Coached by: Antanas Lankas (club), Romualdas Petrukanecas (national)
- Retired: 2024
Medal record
Men's canoe sprint
Representing Lithuania
Olympic Games
Bronze medal – third place	2016 Rio de Janeiro	K-2 200 m
European Championships
Silver medal – second place	2014 Brandenburg	K-2 200 m
Bronze medal – third place	2015 Račice	K-2 200 m

Aurimas Lankas (born 7 September 1985) is a Lithuanian former canoe sprinter and current sports administrator. He won a bronze medal in the K-2 200 m event at the 2016 Summer Olympics in Rio de Janeiro alongside Edvinas Ramanauskas, Lithuania's second-ever Olympic medal in canoeing. He has served as President of the Lithuanian Canoe Federation since 2024.

== Early life and education ==
Lankas was born in Šiauliai and began paddling at age 10–11, introduced to the sport by his father Antanas, who later became his coach. He attended Šiauliai Didždvaris Gymnasium, graduating in 2004. In 2009, he earned a law degree from Vilnius University, specialising in criminal law, and in 2019 completed a Master's in Physical Culture and Sport Pedagogy at Šiauliai University.

== Career ==
Lankas returned to elite competition in 2009, training with the club Irklo Broliai under coaches Antanas Lankas and Romualdas Petrukanecas. His primary event was the K-2 200 m, where he formed a long-term partnership with Edvinas Ramanauskas.

=== Major results ===
Year	Competition	Venue	Event	Position	Notes
2014	European Championships	Brandenburg	K-2 200 m	2nd	Silver medal
2014	World Championships	Moscow	K-2 200 m	5th	Finalist
2015	European Championships	Račice	K-2 200 m	3rd	Bronze medal
2015	European Games	Baku	K-2 200 m	5th	
2016	Summer Olympics	Rio de Janeiro	K-2 200 m	3rd	Bronze medal (32.382 s)
2019	World Championships	Szeged	K-4 500 m	13th	

At the 2016 Olympics, Lankas and Ramanauskas finished behind Spain (gold) and Great Britain (silver), securing Lithuania's first Olympic canoeing medal since 1992.

== Post-athletic career ==
Lankas retired from competitive sport in 2024. In December 2024, he was elected President of the Lithuanian Canoe Federation (LBKIF), with his former K-2 partner Edvinas Ramanauskas appointed General Secretary. In his new role, he has prioritised developing youth talent and ensuring Lithuanian representation at the 2028 Summer Olympics in Los Angeles.

Outside canoeing, Lankas has worked in the financial sector since 2009, holding leadership positions at Šiauliai-based credit unions, and has been a member of the Šiauliai City Council since 2015.

== Personal life ==
Lankas is married to Eglė; they have one son, Aretas. He resides in Šiauliai and lists history, politics, and travel among his hobbies. He speaks Lithuanian, English, and Russian.
