= Piotr Mazur (canoeist) =

Polish sprint canoeist

Personal information
- Nationality: Polish
- Born: 15 October 1991 (age 34)

Sport
- Country: Poland
- Sport: Sprint kayak
- Event: K-2 200 m
Medal record
Men's canoe sprint
Representing Poland
World Championships
Silver medal – second place	2019 Szeged	K-2 200 m

Piotr Mazur (born 15 October 1991) is a Polish sprint canoeist.

He won a medal at the 2019 ICF Canoe Sprint World Championships.
