= Miguel Correa =

Argentine canoeist (born 1983)

Personal information
- Full name: Miguel Antonio Correa
- Born: 11 October 1983 (age 42)

Sport
- Country: Argentina
- Sport: Canoe sprint

Miguel Antonio Correa (born 11 October 1983) is an Argentine sprint canoeist who competed since the late 2000s. At the 2008 Summer Olympics in Beijing, he was eliminated in the semifinals of both the K-1 500 m and the K-1 1000 m events. At the 2012 Summer Olympics, he and teammate Rubén Voisard, finished in 5th in the men's K-2 200 m.

He was granted the Konex Award Merit Diploma in 2010 as one of the five best canoe racers of the last decade in Argentina. He won the silver medal at the 2011 Pan American Games.
