= Ryan Cochrane (canoeist) =

Canadian kayaker (born 1983)

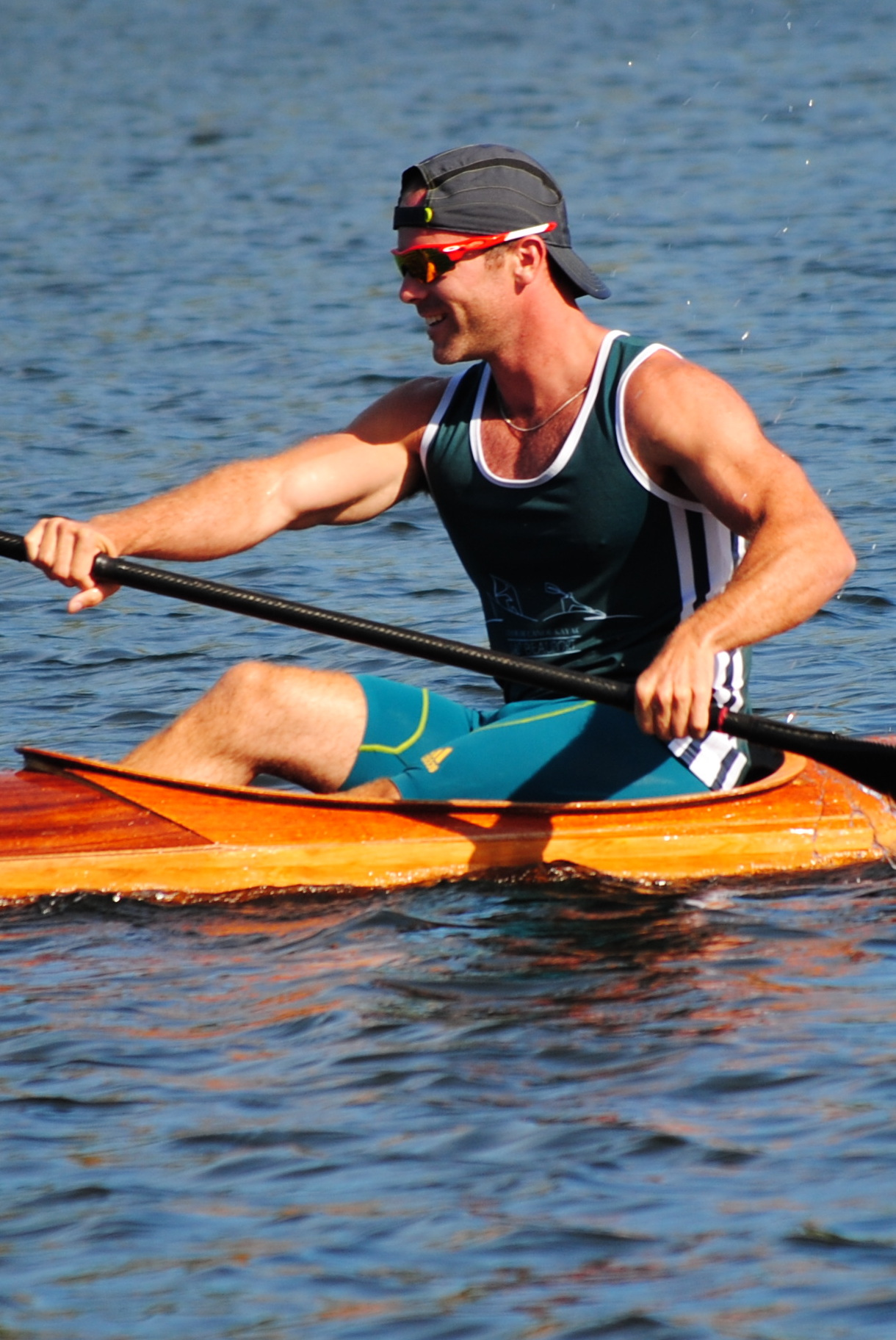

Personal information
- Nationality: Canadian
- Born: July 24, 1983 (age 42) Halifax, Nova Scotia
- Height: 1.78 m (5 ft 10 in)
- Weight: 74 kg (163 lb)

Sport
- Sport: Kayaking
Medal record
Men's kayaking
Representing Canada
Pan American Games
Gold medal – first place	2011 Guadalajara	K-2 200 metres
- Updated on July 2012

Ryan Cochrane (born July 24, 1983) is a Canadian kayaker. He was born in Halifax, Nova Scotia. He competed in K-2 (both 200m and 1000m) together with Hugues Fournel at the 2012 Summer Olympics in London.

On August 1, 2016 (after the suspension of the Russian crew) he was named to Canada's 2016 Olympic team in the men's K-2 200 m event.

== See also ==
- Ryan Cochrane (swimmer)
