= Edvinas Ramanauskas =

Lithuanian canoeist (born 1985)

Personal information
- Nationality: Lithuanian
- Born: August 18, 1985 (age 40) Šiauliai, Lithuania
- Education: Šiauliai University (BA, Business Administration)

Sport
- Country: Lithuania
- Sport: Canoe sprint
- Event: K-2 200 m
- Club: Irklo broliai
- Partner: Aurimas Lankas
- Coached by: Antanas Lankas (club), Romas Petrukanecas (national)
- Retired: 2024
Medal record
Men's canoe sprint
Representing Lithuania
Olympic Games
| Bronze medal – third place | 2016 Rio de Janeiro | K-2 200 m |
European Championships
| Silver medal – second place | 2014 Brandenburg | K-2 200 m |
| Bronze medal – third place | 2015 Račice | K-2 200 m |

Edvinas Ramanauskas (born 18 August 1985, in Šiauliai) is a Lithuanian sprint canoer who won the bronze medal in the men's K-2 200 m event at the 2016 Summer Olympics with partner Aurimas Lankas.

== Career ==
Ramanauskas made his senior international debut at the 2011 ICF Canoe Sprint World Championships in Szeged, competing in the K-2 200 m event. In 2014 Canoe Sprint European Championships Edvinas Ramanauskas and Aurimas Lankas won silver medals in the K-2 200 m event. At the 2014 ICF Canoe Sprint World Championships in Moscow, Lankas and Ramanauskas reached the final in the K-2 200 m, finishing fifth. At the 2015 European Championships in Račice, the duo won a bronze medal in the K-2 200 m event.

At the 2016 Summer Olympics in Rio de Janeiro, Ramanauskas and Lankas won their qualification heat in the K-2 200 m, advancing directly to the final. In the final, they led for most of the race before finishing third behind Spain and Great Britain, securing the bronze medal. He was the flag bearer for Lithuania during the closing ceremony. In 2019, Ramanauskas competed in the K-4 500 m event at the 2019 ICF Canoe Sprint World Championships, finishing 13th with the Lithuanian team.

== Post-athletic career ==
Ramanauskas ended his competitive career in 2024. In December 2024, Ramanauskas was elected General Secretary of the Lithuanian Canoe Federation, replacing Romualdas Petrukanecas in the role. He has been a member of the Lithuanian National Olympic Committee's Athletes' Commission since 2021. In 2016, he was awarded the Officer's Cross of the Order for Merits to Lithuania.

== See also ==
- Aurimas Lankas
