= Alexander Dyachenko (canoeist) =

Russian canoeist

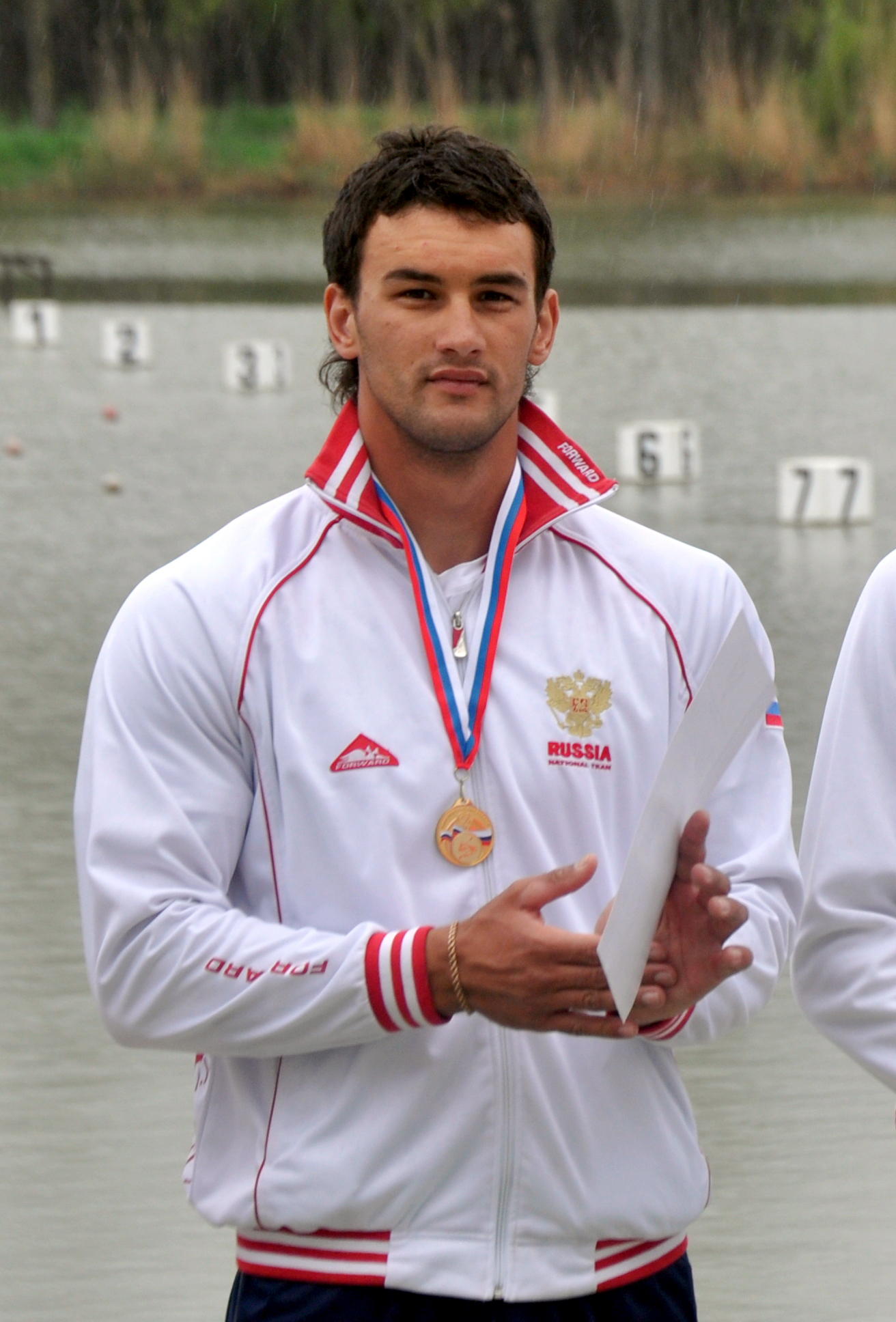
- Dyachenko in 2011

Personal information
- Nationality: Russian
- Born: 24 January 1990 (age 36) Rudny, Kazakh SSR, Soviet Union
- Height: 1.86 m (6 ft 1 in)
- Weight: 95 kg (209 lb)

Sport
- Country: Russia
- Sport: Sprint kayak
- Event: K–2 200 m
- Club: Krylatskoye Centre of Sports Preparation
- Partner: Yury Postrigay

Achievements and titles
- Olympic finals: 2012 London
Medal record
Men's canoe sprint
Representing Russia
Olympic Games
Gold medal – first place	2012 London	K-2 200 m
World Championships
Gold medal – first place	2013 Duisburg	K-2 200 m
Gold medal – first place	2019 Szeged	K-2 200 m
Silver medal – second place	2011 Szeged	K-1 4×200 m
Silver medal – second place	2013 Duisburg	K-1 4×200 m
Bronze medal – third place	2009 Dartmouth	K-4 200 m
Bronze medal – third place	2010 Poznań	K-1 4×200 m
European Championships
Gold medal – first place	2013 Montemor-o-Velho	K-2 200 m
Silver medal – second place	2009 Brandenburg	K-4 200 m
Silver medal – second place	2017 Plovdiv	K-2 200 m
Bronze medal – third place	2021 Poznań	K-2 200 m
Universiade
Gold medal – first place	2013 Kazan	K-2 200 m

Alexander Igorevich Dyachenko (Russian: Александр Игоревич Дьяченко; born 24 January 1990) is a banned Russian sprint canoeist.

He won the Men's K-2 200 metres gold medal at the 2012 Summer Olympics with Yury Postrigay. At the ICF Canoe Sprint World Championships he has won one gold medal (K-2 200 m: 2013), three silver medals (K-1 x 200 m: 2011, 2013, K-2 200 m: 2015) and two bronze medals (K-1 4 × 200 m: 2010, K-4 200 m: 2009).

Dyachenko began canoeing at the age of 6.

In June 2022, Dyachenko was one of three Russian canoeists who were given doping bans along with Nikolay Lipkin and Aleksandra Dupik. He was given a four year ban starting on 9 June 2022 and all of his results from 5 June 2014 to 31 December 2016 were disqualified. The ICF officially stripped the medals that Dyachenko won during this period, but he retained his Olympic gold medal.

In June 2023, Dyachenko successfully appealed his disqualification to a Russian court, which overturned his disqualification "on the Russian territory", meaning he can compete and coach in Russia.

== Personal life ==
Dyachenko is married to honored Master of Sports of Russia, rhythmic gymnastics coach, Anna Shumilova. Their daughter, Inna, was born on 21 July 2014. He himself was awarded the title of Honoured Master of Sport in Russia in 2015. He was also awarded the Russian Order of Friendship after winning his Olympic gold medal.
