= 2015 European Eventing Championship =

European Eventing Championship

The 2015 European Eventing Championship was held from September 10 to September 13, 2015 at Blair Castle, Scotland, UK. The competition is also used as qualification to the 2016 Summer Olympics. Two teams were to qualify. Germany, Great Britain, Ireland and Netherlands were already qualified. The two best teams outside those - France and Sweden - qualified.

== Results ==
Final Individual Result

Rank	Rider	Horse	Nation	Dressage	Cross country	Show jumping	Total
1st place, gold medalist(s)	Michael Jung	fischerTakinou	GER	33.50	0.00	0.00	33.50
2nd place, silver medalist(s)	Sandra Auffarth	Opgun Louvo	GER	31.40	11.20	0.00	42.60
3rd place, bronze medalist(s)	Thibaut Vallette	Qing du Briot ENE HN	FRA	36.80	8.40	0.00	45.20
4	Kitty King	Persimmon	GBR	36.90	8.40	0.00	45.30
5	Ingrid Klimke	Horseware Hale Bob	GER	37.80	8.80	0.00	46.60
6	Isabelle Taylor	KBIS Briarlands Matilda	GBR	44.00	0.00	4.00	48.00
7	Dirk Schrade	Hop and Skip	GER	43.10	5.20	0.00	48.30
8	Pippa Funnell	Sandman 7	GBR	41.00	9.60	0.00	50.60
9	Gemma Tattersall	Arctic Soul	GBR	47.30	0.00	6.00	53.30
10	Peter Thomsen	Horseware's Barny	GER	47.30	10.40	0.00	57.70
11	Nicolas Touzaint	Radijague	FRA	40.40	14.00	4.00	58.40
12	Sam Watson	Horseware Lukeswell	IRL	44.10	15.20	0.00	59.30
13	Laura Collett	Grand Manoeuvre	GBR	37.80	10.80	11.00	59.60
14	Michael Ryan	Ballylynch Adventure	IRL	51.90	9.20	0.00	61.10
15	Luca Roman	Castlewoods Jake	ITA	48.80	13.60	0.00	62.40
16	Mathieu Lemoine	Bart L	FRA	39.70	23.60	0.00	63.30
17	Oliver Townend	Fenyas Elegance	GBR	38.70	26.00	0.00	64.70
18	Tim Lips	Keyflow N.O.P.	NED	48.80	16.80	0.00	65.60
19	Emiliano Portale	Rubens delle Sementarecce	ITA	45.90	17.60	8.00	71.50
20	Merel Blom	Rumour Has It N.O.P.	NED	47.40	26.00	0.00	73.40
21	Holly Woodhead	DHI Lupinson	GBR	31.70	38.00	4.00	73.70
22	Theo van de Vendel	Zindane	NED	57.90	12.40	4.00	74.30
23	Sara Algotsson Ostholt	Reality 39	SWE	41.60	21.60	12.00	75.20
24	Thomas Carlile	Sirocco du Gers	FRA	43.20	28.00	4.00	75.20
25	Carlos Díaz Fernandez	Junco CP	ESP	49.20	26.80	0.00	76.00
26	Sarah Bullimore	Lilly Corinne	GBR	38.20	30.40	8.00	76.60
27	Nicola Wilson	One Two Many	GBR	34.60	38.80	4.00	77.40
28	Arianna Schivo	Quefira de l'Ormeau	ITA	55.30	20.00	4.00	79.30
29	Camilla Speirs	Portersize Just a Jiff	IRL	53.90	21.60	4.00	79.50
30	Joris Vanspringel	Lully des Aulnes	BEL	56.40	23.60	0.00	80.00
31	Anna Nilsson	Luron	SWE	39.70	32.80	8.00	80.50
32	Patrizia Attinger	Raumalpha	SUI	42.40	39.20	0.00	81.60
33	Hanne Wind Ramsgaard	Vestervangs Arami	DEN	48.30	30.00	8.00	86.30
34	Bettina Hoy	Designer 10	GER	44.30	44.80	0.00	89.10
35	Ben Vogg	Bellaney Castle	SUI	51.90	36.80	4.00	92.70
36	Gwendolen Fer	Romantic Love	FRA	40.30	45.20	8.00	93.50
37	Elmo Jankari	Duchess Desiree	FIN	50.90	50.40	4.00	105.30
38	Maria Pinedo Sendagorta	Carriem van Colen Z	ESP	49.60	65.20	4.00	118.80
39	Louise Svensson Jähde	Viva 29	SWE	52.20	65.20	8.00	125.40
40	Niklas Lindbäck	Cendrillon	SWE	38.10	74.00	17.00	129.10
41	Elnira Nabieva	Chabanak	RUS	53.70	71.60	8.00	133.30
	Cristina Pinedo Sendagorta	Helena XII	ESP	57.60	37.60	Eliminated in show jumping	
	Alberto Hermoso Farras	Mirla CP 27 58	ESP	58.20	24.40	Withdrawn after holdingbox	
	Boris Vasilev	Nabludatel	RUS	72.50	42.80	Withdrawn after holdingbox	
	William Oakden	Greystone Midnight Melody	GBR	46.40	26.40	Withdrawn before horse inspection	
	Francis Whittington	Easy Target	GBR	37.50	Retired during cross country		
	Karin Donckers	Fletcha van't Verahof	BEL	40.30	Retired during cross country		
	William Fox-Pitt	Bay My Hero	GBR	43.00	Retired during cross country		
	Jacek Jeruzal	Flandia 2	POL	49.30	Retired during cross country		
	Sanna Siltakorpi	Lucky Accord	FIN	51.30	Retired during cross country		
	Karim Florent Laghouag	Entebbe de Hus	FRA	38.70	Eliminated in cross country		
	Pietro Roman	Barraduff	ITA	41.90	Eliminated in cross country		
	Padraig McCarthy	Simon Porloe	IRL	46.60	Eliminated in cross country		
	Alice Naber-Lozeman	ACSI Peter Parker	NED	46.80	Eliminated in cross country		
	Austin O'Connor	Balham Houdini	IRL	47.10	Eliminated in cross country		
	Joseph Murphy	Sportsfield Othello	IRL	50.00	Eliminated in cross country		
	Giovanni Ugolotti	Oplitas	ITA	50.20	Eliminated in cross country		
	Giel Vanhouche	Figaro de Verby	BEL	51.40	Eliminated in cross country		
	Johan Lundin	Johnny Cash	SWE	51.70	Eliminated in cross country		
	Pietro Sandei	Inistioge Ohio	ITA	52.40	Eliminated in cross country		
	Daniel Dunst	Daiquiri Key West	AUT	53.00	Eliminated in cross country		
	Mikhail Nastenko	Reistag	RUS	53.60	Eliminated in cross country		
	Camille Guyot	Larnac de Vulbens	SUI	56.60	Eliminated in cross country		
	Jasmin Gambirasio	That's It	SUI	58.00	Eliminated in cross country		
	Irene Mia Hastrup	Constantin M	DEN	52.60	Withdrew before cross country		
	Ludwig Svennerstål	Franzipan	SWE	Withdrew before dressage			
	Igor Atrokhov	Indigo Pyreneen	RUS	Not accepted before dressage			

=== Team results ===
Team Standings

Nation	Individual results						Team penalties	Team rank
Nation	Rider	Horse	Dressage	Cross Country	Jumping	Total	Team penalties	Team rank
GER	Michael Jung	fischerTakinou	33.50	0.00	0.00	33.50	122.70	1st place, gold medalist(s)
GER	Sandra Auffarth	Opgun Louvo	31.40	11.20	0.00	42.60	122.70	1st place, gold medalist(s)
GER	Ingrid Klimke	Horseware Hale Bob	37.80	8.80	0.00	46.60	122.70	1st place, gold medalist(s)
GER	Dirk Schrade	Hop and Skip	43.10	5.20	0.00	~~48.30~~	122.70	1st place, gold medalist(s)
GBR	Kitty King	Persimmon	36.90	8.40	0.00	45.30	173.30	2nd place, silver medalist(s)
GBR	Pippa Funnell	Sandman 7	41.00	9.60	0.00	50.60	173.30	2nd place, silver medalist(s)
GBR	Nicola Wilson	One Two Many	34.60	38.80	4.00	77.40	173.30	2nd place, silver medalist(s)
GBR	William Fox-Pitt	Bay My Hero	43.00	Rt	DNQ	~~1000.00~~	173.30	2nd place, silver medalist(s)
FRA	Thibaut Vallette	Qing du Briot ENE HN	36.80	8.40	0.00	45.20	183.70	3rd place, bronze medalist(s)
FRA	Mathieu Lemoine	Bart L	39.70	23.60	0.00	63.30	183.70	3rd place, bronze medalist(s)
FRA	Thomas Carlile	Sirocco du Gers	43.20	28.00	4.00	75.20	183.70	3rd place, bronze medalist(s)
FRA	Karim Laghouag	Entebbe de Hus	38.70	EL	DNQ	~~1000.00~~	183.70	3rd place, bronze medalist(s)
NED	Tim Lips	Keyflow N.O.P.	48.80	16.80	0.00	65.60	213.30	4
NED	Merel Blom	Rumour Has It N.O.P.	47.40	26.00	0.00	73.40	213.30	4
NED	Theo van de Vendel	Zindane	57.90	12.40	4.00	74.30	213.30	4
NED	Alice Naber-Lozeman	ACSI Peter Parker	46.80	EL	DNQ	~~1000.00~~	213.30	4
SWE	Sara Algotsson Ostholt	Reality 39	41.60	21.60	12.00	75.20	284.80	5
SWE	Anna Nilsson	Luron	39.70	32.80	8.00	80.50	284.80	5
SWE	Niklas Lindbäck	Cendrillon	38.10	74.00	17.00	129.10	284.80	5
SWE	Johan Lundin	Johnny Cash	51.70	EL	DNQ	~~1000.00~~	284.80	5
ITA	Luca Roman	Castlewoods Jake	48.80	13.60	0.00	62.40	1141.70	6
ITA	Arianna Schivo	Quefira de l'Ormeau	55.30	20.00	4.00	79.30	1141.70	6
ITA	Pietro Roman	Barraduff	41.90	EL	DNQ	1000.00	1141.70	6
ITA	Giovanni Ugolotti	Oplitas	50.20	EL	DNQ	~~1000.00~~	1141.70	6
SUI	Patrizia Attinger	Raumalpha	42.40	39.20	0.00	81.60	1174.30	7
SUI	Ben Vogg	Bellaney Castle	51.90	36.80	4.00	92.70	1174.30	7
SUI	Camille Guyot	Larnac de Vulbens	56.60	EL	DNQ	1000.00	1174.30	7
SUI	Jasmin Gambirasio	That's it	58.00	EL	DNQ	~~1000.00~~	1174.30	7
ESP	Carlos Díaz Fernandez	Junco CP	49.20	26.80	0.00	76.00	1194.80	8
ESP	Maria Pinedo Sendagorta	Carriem van Colen Z	49.60	65.20	4.00	118.80	1194.80	8
ESP	Cristina Pinedo Sendagorta	Helena XII	57.60	37.60	EL	1000.00	1194.80	8
ESP	Albert Hermoso Farras	Mirla CP 27 50	58.20	24.40	WD	~~1000.00~~	1194.80	8
IRL	Michael Ryan	Ballylynch Adventure	51.90	9.20	0.00	61.10	2061.10	9
IRL	Padraig McCarthy	Simon Porloe	46.60	EL	DNQ	1000.00	2061.10	9
IRL	Austin O'Connor	Balham Houdini	47.10	EL	DNQ	1000.00	2061.10	9
IRL	Joseph Murphy	Sportsfield Othello	50.00	EL	DNQ	~~1000.00~~	2061.10	9
BEL	Joris Vanspringel	Lully des Aulnes	56.40	23.60	0.00	80.00	2080.00	10
BEL	Karin Donckers	Fletcha van't Verahof	40.30	Rt	DNQ	1000.00	2080.00	10
BEL	Giel Vanhouche	Figaro de Verby	51.40	EL	DNQ	1000.00	2080.00	10
RUS	Elnira Nabieva	Chabanak	53.70	71.60	8.00	133.30	2133.30	11
RUS	Boris Vasilev	Nabludatel	72.50	42.80	WD	1000.00	2133.30	11
RUS	Mikhail Nastenko	Reistag	53.60	EL	DNQ	1000.00	2133.30	11

Qualified for the 2016 Summer Olympics

- EL = Eliminated
- Rt = Retired
- WD = Withdrew
- DNQ = Did not qualify
