= Aleksandr Markov =

Aleksandr Markov may refer to:

- Aleksandr Markov (equestrian) (born 1985), Russian eventing rider

== See also ==
- Alexander Markov, Russian American violinist
- Alexander V. Markov (born 1965), Russian biologist, paleontologist and popularizer of science
