= Van de Vendel =

Van de Vendel or van de Vendel is a surname. Notable people with the surname include:

- Edward van de Vendel (born 1964), Dutch author of children's literature
- Theo van de Vendel (born 1980), Dutch Olympic eventing rider
