= Alice Naber-Lozeman =

Dutch Olympic eventing rider (born 1971)

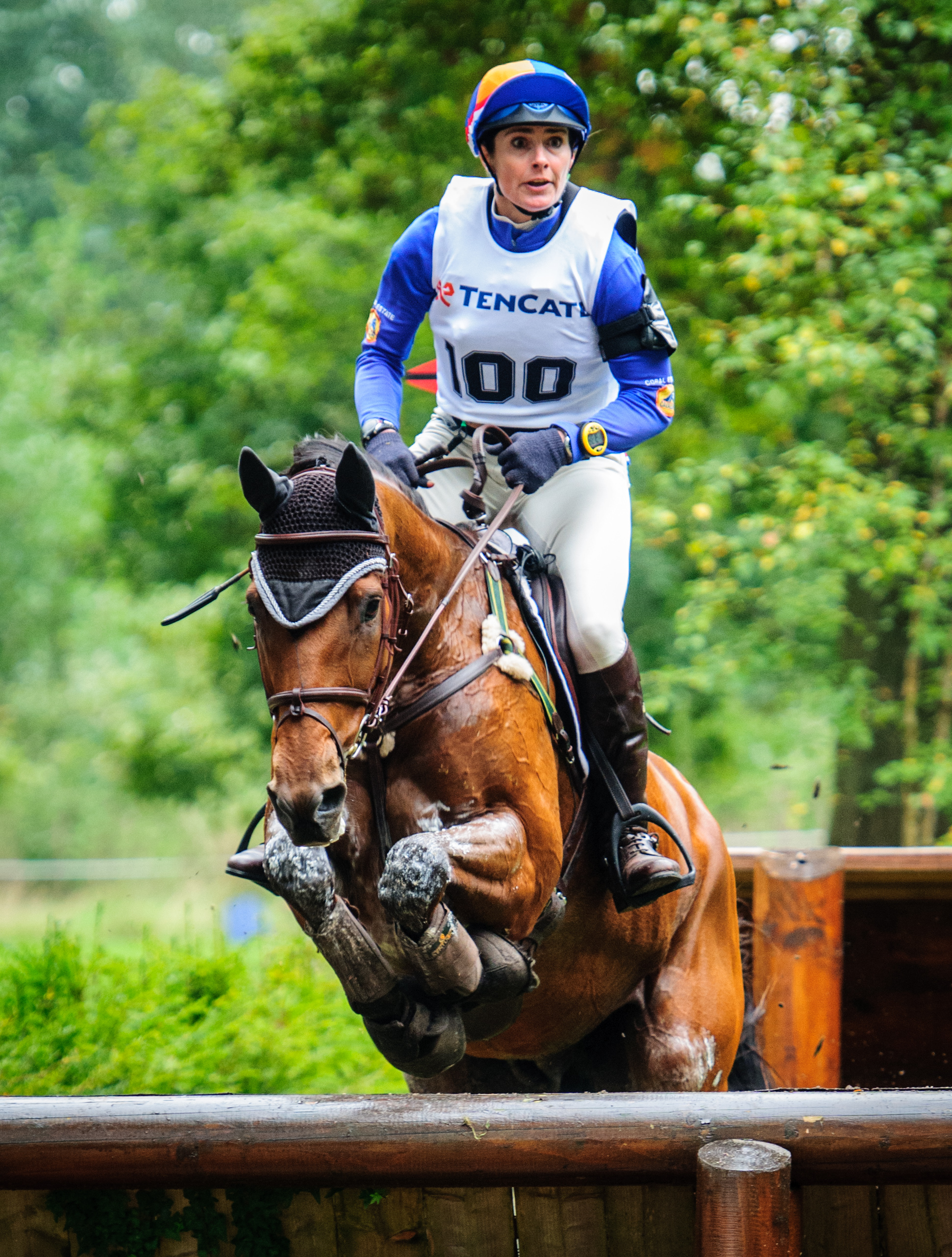
- Naber-Lozeman riding Peter Parker (2013)

Personal information
- Full name: Alice Maria Naber-Lozeman
- Born: 7 May 1971 (age 53); Putten, Gelderland
- Height: 168 cm (5 ft 6 in)
- Weight: 62 kg (137 lb)

Alice Maria Naber-Lozeman (born 7 May 1971) is a Dutch Olympic eventing rider. She competed at the 2016 Summer Olympics in Rio de Janeiro where she finished 32nd in the individual and 6th in the team competition.

Naber-Lozeman also competed at three editions of European Eventing Championships (in 1999, 2003 and 2015). Her best result came in 2015, when she placed 4th in the team eventing competition.
