= Rebecca Howard =

Canadian equestrian (born 1979)

Personal information
- Born: May 9, 1979 (age 47) Salmon Arm, British Columbia
- Height: 162 cm (5.31 ft)
- Weight: 70 kg (150 lb)

Sport
- Country: Canada
- Sport: Equestrian
- Event: Eventing
Medal record
Equestrian
Representing Canada
Pan American Games
Silver medal – second place	2011 Guadalajara	Team eventing

Rebecca Howard (born May 9, 1979, in Salmon Arm, British Columbia) is a Canadian Equestrian Team athlete in Eventing. She competed at two Summer Olympics (in 2012 and 2016). Her best Olympic results came in 2016, when she placed 10th in both individual and team competitions and was the highest placed female rider.

Howard also represented Canada at the 2010 World Equestrian Games in Kentucky, United States, where she achieved 23rd position in individual eventing. Following year she competed at the 2011 Pan American Games, where she placed 6th in individual and helped Canada in winning a team silver.

In July 2016, she was named to Canada's Olympic team.
