= Canada at the 2016 Summer Olympics =

- IOC code: CAN
- NOC: Canadian Olympic Committee
- Website: www.olympic.ca (in English and French)

in Rio de Janeiro
- Competitors: 314 in 27 sports
- Flag bearers: Rosie MacLennan (opening); Penny Oleksiak (closing)
- Medals Ranked 20th: Gold 4 Silver 3 Bronze 15 Total 22

Summer Olympics appearances (overview)
- ~~1900~~; 1904; 1908; 1912; 1920; 1924; 1928; 1932; 1936; 1948; 1952; 1956; 1960; 1964; 1968; 1972; 1976; 1980; 1984; 1988; 1992; 1996; 2000; 2004; 2008; 2012; 2016; 2020; 2024; 2028

Other related appearances
- 1906 Intercalated Games

Canada competed at the 2016 Summer Olympics in Rio de Janeiro, Brazil, from August 5 to August 21, 2016. Since the nation's debut in 1900, Canadian athletes had appeared in every edition of the Summer Olympic Games, with the exception of the 1980 Summer Olympics in Moscow because of the country's support for the United States-led boycott. The chef de mission was Curt Harnett, appointed in April 2016 after Jean-Luc Brassard, the original chef de mission, resigned his position.

A total of 314 athletes, 128 men and 186 women over 27 sports (all of the Olympic sports except handball), represented the country, an increase of 37 athletes from 2012. The team contained 98 coaches and 107 support staff (such as doctors and physiotherapists among others). Originally, 312 athletes were named to the team, however two male athletes were added in kayaking on July 29, 2016, following the suspension of Russian athletes, thus bringing the total to 314. Canada qualified five squads in team sports, matching the record high from 1984. Canada's official goal (set by Own the Podium) for these games were at least 19 medals of any colour (an improvement of one or more from 2012), and a top 12 finish in terms of overall medals won. Canada left the games with 22 medals (ranked in the top ten in terms of overall medals), which matched the total from the 1996 Games in Atlanta, the previous high for a non-boycotted games. Canadian athletes were paid for medals earned. Gold medallists earned $20,000; silver medallists were paid $15,000; and bronze medallists $10,000, coming from the Athlete Excellence Fund.

Rosie MacLennan, trampoline gymnast who had left the 2012 Games as the sole Canadian to win gold, was honored as Canada's flagbearer at the opening ceremony. Swimmer Penny Oleksiak broke the country's Olympic record for most medals (4) won by a single Canadian athlete in any Summer Olympic Games, as well as becoming the youngest ever Canadian gold medallist. At the end of the Games, she was appointed as the flagbearer for the team at the closing ceremony, becoming Canada's youngest flag-bearer in Olympic history.

== Medallists ==
Medal	Name	Sport	Event	Date
Gold	Penny Oleksiak	Swimming	Women's 100 m freestyle	August 11
Gold	Rosie MacLennan	Gymnastics	Women's trampoline	August 12
Gold	Derek Drouin	Athletics	Men's high jump	August 16
Gold	Erica Wiebe	Wrestling	Women's freestyle 75 kg	August 18
Silver	Penny Oleksiak	Swimming	Women's 100 m butterfly	August 7
Silver	Lindsay Jennerich; Patricia Obee	Rowing	Women's lightweight double sculls	August 12
Silver	Andre De Grasse	Athletics	Men's 200 m	August 18
Bronze	Sandrine Mainville; Penny Oleksiak; Chantal van Landeghem; Michelle Williams; Taylor Ruck	Swimming	Women's 4 × 100 m freestyle relay	August 6
Bronze	Canada women's rugby sevens team: Brittany Benn; Hannah Darling; Bianca Farella; Jen Kish; Ghislaine Landry; Megan Lukan; Kayla Moleschi; Karen Paquin; Kelly Russell; Ashley Steacy; Natasha Watcham-Roy; Charity Williams	Rugby sevens	Women's tournament	August 8
Bronze	Kylie Masse	Swimming	Women's 100 m backstroke	August 8
Bronze	Meaghan Benfeito; Roseline Filion	Diving	Women's synchronized 10 m platform	August 9
Bronze	Katerine Savard; Penny Oleksiak; Emily Overholt; Brittany MacLean; Taylor Ruck; Kennedy Goss	Swimming	Women's 4 × 200 m freestyle relay	August 10
Bronze	Hilary Caldwell	Swimming	Women's 200 m backstroke	August 12
Bronze	Allison Beveridge; Laura Brown; Jasmin Glaesser; Kirsti Lay; Georgia Simmerling	Cycling	Women's team pursuit	August 13
Bronze	Brianne Theisen-Eaton	Athletics	Women's heptathlon	August 13
Bronze	Andre De Grasse	Athletics	Men's 100 m	August 14
Bronze	Meaghan Benfeito	Diving	Women's 10 metre platform	August 18
Bronze	Damian Warner	Athletics	Men's decathlon	August 18
Bronze	Canada women's national soccer team: Stephanie Labbé; Allysha Chapman; Kadeisha Buchanan; Shelina Zadorsky; Quinn (Note: Then known as Rebecca Quinn); Deanne Rose; Rhian Wilkinson; Diana Matheson; Josée Bélanger; Ashley Lawrence; Desiree Scott; Christine Sinclair; Sophie Schmidt; Melissa Tancredi; Nichelle Prince; Janine Beckie; Jessie Fleming; Sabrina D'Angelo	Football	Women's tournament	August 19
Bronze	Eric Lamaze	Equestrian	Individual jumping	August 19
Bronze	Aaron Brown; Andre De Grasse; Akeem Haynes; Brendon Rodney; Bolade Ajomale	Athletics	Men's 4 × 100 metres relay	August 19
Bronze	Catharine Pendrel	Cycling	Women's cross-country	August 20

Medals by sport/discipline
Sport	1st place, gold medalist(s)	2nd place, silver medalist(s)	3rd place, bronze medalist(s)	Total
Swimming	1	1	4	6
Athletics	1	1	4	6
Gymnastics	1	0	0	1
Wrestling	1	0	0	1
Rowing	0	1	0	1
Cycling	0	0	2	2
Diving	0	0	2	2
Equestrian	0	0	1	1
Football	0	0	1	1
Rugby sevens	0	0	1	1
Total	4	3	15	22

Medals by day
Day	1st place, gold medalist(s)	2nd place, silver medalist(s)	3rd place, bronze medalist(s)	Total
August 6	0	0	1	1
August 7	0	1	0	1
August 8	0	0	2	2
August 9	0	0	1	1
August 10	0	0	1	1
August 11	1	0	0	1
August 12	1	1	1	3
August 13	0	0	2	2
August 14	0	0	1	1
August 15	0	0	0	0
August 16	1	0	0	1
August 17	0	0	0	0
August 18	1	1	2	4
August 19	0	0	3	3
August 20	0	0	1	1
Total	4	3	15	22

Medals by gender
Gender	1st place, gold medalist(s)	2nd place, silver medalist(s)	3rd place, bronze medalist(s)	Total
Male	1	1	4	6
Female	3	2	11	16
Total	4	3	15	22

Multiple medallists
Name	Sport	1st place, gold medalist(s)	2nd place, silver medalist(s)	3rd place, bronze medalist(s)	Total
Penny Oleksiak	Swimming	1	1	2	4
Andre De Grasse	Athletics	0	1	2	3
Meaghan Benfeito	Diving	0	0	2	2
Taylor Ruck	Swimming	0	0	2	2

== Competitors ==
The following is the list of number of competitors participating in the Games. Note that reserves in field hockey and football are not counted in the total:

Sport	Men	Women	Total
Archery	1	1	2
Athletics	28	38	66
Badminton	1	1	2
Basketball	0	12	12
Boxing	1	2	3
Canoeing	7	4	11
Cycling	7	12	19
Diving	3	4	7
Equestrian	2	8	10
Fencing	3	2	5
Field hockey	16	0	16
Football	0	18	18
Golf	2	2	4
Gymnastics	2	6	8
Judo	4	3	7
Modern pentathlon	0	2	2
Rowing	12	14	26
Rugby sevens	0	12	12
Sailing	5	4	9
Shooting	0	2	2
Swimming	10	20	30
Synchronized swimming	0	2	2
Table tennis	1	1	2
Taekwondo	0	1	1
Tennis	2	2	4
Triathlon	2	3	5
Volleyball	16	4	20
Weightlifting	1	1	2
Wrestling	2	6	8
Total	128	187	315

== Archery ==
One Canadian archer qualified for the men's individual recurve by obtaining one eight places available from the 2015 World Archery Championships in Copenhagen, Denmark. Meanwhile, another Canadian archer qualified securing one of three available spots in the women's individual recurve at the Pan American Qualification Tournament in Medellín, Colombia. Georcy-Stéphanie Picard was named to the team on June 9, 2016. Crispin Duenas was later named to the team officially on June 29, 2016. The team was officially named on July 6, 2016.

Athlete	Event	Ranking round		Round of 69	Round of 32	Round of 16	Quarterfinals	Semifinals	Final / BM	
Athlete	Event	Score	Seed	Opposition Score	Opposition Score	Opposition Score	Opposition Score	Opposition Score	Opposition Score	Rank
Crispin Duenas	Men's individual	669	18	Galiazzo (ITA); W 6–5	Garrett (USA); L 3–7	did not advance				
Georcy-Stéphanie Picard	Women's individual	585	61	Tan Y-t (TPE); L 1–7	did not advance					

== Athletics (track and field) ==
Canadian athletes achieved qualifying standards in the following athletics events (up to a maximum of 3 athletes in each event): The team was selected based on the results of the 2016 Canadian Olympic Track & Field Trials. The Canadian road events have standards that are different from the IAAF and are listed below. On July 11, a team of 65 athletes (28 men and 37 women) was announced, marking the largest ever track and field team Canada has sent to the Olympics. Athletes Oluwasegun Makinde, Marissa Kurtimah and Micha Powell who were named as relay alternates did not compete in any race.

The six medals won by Canadian athletes were the most won in athletics since the 1928 Summer Olympics.

Key

- Note–Ranks given for track events are within the athlete's heat only
- Q = Qualified for the next round
- q = Qualified for the next round as a fastest loser or, in field events, by position without achieving the qualifying target
- NR = National record
- N/A = Round not applicable for the event
- Bye = Athlete not required to compete in round

Track & road events
Men

Athlete	Event	Heat		Quarterfinal		Semifinal		Final	
Athlete	Event	Result	Rank	Result	Rank	Result	Rank	Result	Rank
Aaron Brown	100 m	Bye		10.24	3	Did not advance			
Andre De Grasse	100 m	Bye		10.04	1 Q	9.92	2 Q	9.91	3rd place, bronze medalist(s)
Akeem Haynes	100 m	Bye		10.22	6	Did not advance			
Aaron Brown	200 m	20.23	3 q	—N/a		20.37	7	Did not advance	
Andre De Grasse	200 m	20.09	1 Q	—N/a		19.80 NR	2 Q	20.02	2nd place, silver medalist(s)
Brendon Rodney	200 m	20.34	3	—N/a		Did not advance			
Brandon McBride	800 m	1:45.99	1 Q	—N/a		1:45.41	6	Did not advance	
Anthony Romaniw	800 m	1:47.59	6	—N/a		Did not advance			
Nathan Brannen	1500 m	3:47.07	4 Q	—N/a		3:40.20	7 q	3:51.45	10
Charles Philibert-Thiboutot	1500 m	3:40.04	8 q	—N/a		3:40.79	9	Did not advance	
Mohammed Ahmed	5000 m	13:21.00	6 q	—N/a				13:05.94	4
Lucas Bruchet	5000 m	14:02.02	19	—N/a				Did not advance	
Mohammed Ahmed	10000 m	—N/a						29:32.84	32
Johnathan Cabral	110 m hurdles	13.63	4 Q	—N/a		13.41	4 q	13.41	6
Sekou Kaba	110 m hurdles	13.70	8	—N/a		Did not advance			
Matthew Hughes	3000 m steeplechase	8:26.27	4 q	—N/a				8:36.83	10
Taylor Milne	3000 m steeplechase	8:34.38	9	—N/a				Did not advance	
Chris Winter	3000 m steeplechase	8:33.95	10	—N/a				Did not advance	
Aaron Brown; Andre De Grasse; Akeem Haynes; Brendon Rodney; Mobolade Ajomale^{[a]}	4 × 100 m relay	37.89	3 Q	—N/a				37.64 NR	3rd place, bronze medalist(s)
Reid Coolsaet	Marathon	—N/a						2:14:58	23
Eric Gillis	Marathon	—N/a						2:12:29	10
Evan Dunfee	20 km walk	—N/a						1:20:49	10
Inaki Gomez	20 km walk	—N/a						1:21:12	12
Benjamin Thorne	20 km walk	—N/a						1:22:28	27
Mathieu Bilodeau	50 km walk	—N/a						Did not finish	
Evan Dunfee	50 km walk	—N/a						3:41:38 NR	4

^{a} Athletes who participated in the heats only and received medals.

Women

Athlete	Event	Heat		Quarterfinal		Semifinal		Final	
Athlete	Event	Result	Rank	Result	Rank	Result	Rank	Result	Rank
Khamica Bingham	100 m	Bye		11.41	3	Did not advance			
Crystal Emmanuel	100 m	Bye		11.43	4	Did not advance			
Crystal Emmanuel	200 m	22.80	3 Q	—N/a		23.05	8	Did not advance	
Kimberly Hyacinthe	200 m	DNS		—N/a		Did not advance			
Alicia Brown	400 m	52.27	5	—N/a		Did not advance			
Kendra Clarke	400 m	53.61	6	—N/a		Did not advance			
Carline Muir	400 m	51.57	2 Q	—N/a		51.11	5	Did not advance	
Melissa Bishop	800 m	1:58.38	1 Q	—N/a		1:59.05	2 Q	1:57.02 NR	4
Nicole Sifuentes	1500 m	4:07.43	7 q	—N/a		4:08.53	7	Did not advance	
Gabriela Stafford	1500 m	4:09.45	9	—N/a		Did not advance			
Hilary Stellingwerff	1500 m	4:12.00	7	—N/a		Did not advance			
Jessica O'Connell	5000 m	15:51.18	13	—N/a				Did not advance	
Andrea Seccafien	5000 m	15:30.32	11	—N/a				Did not advance	
Lanni Marchant	10000 m	—N/a						32:04.21	25
Natasha Wodak	10000 m	—N/a						31:53.14	22
Phylicia George	100 m hurdles	12.83	2 Q	—N/a		12.77	2 Q	12.89	8
Nikkita Holder	100 m hurdles	12.92	4 q	—N/a		DSQ*			
Angela Whyte	100 m hurdles	13.09	6	—N/a		Did not advance			
Chanice Chase-Taylor	400 m hurdles	1:02.83	8	—N/a		Did not advance			
Noelle Montcalm	400 m hurdles	56.07	2 Q	—N/a		56.28	6	Did not advance	
Sage Watson	400 m hurdles	55.93	2 Q	—N/a		55.44	4	Did not advance	
Maria Bernard	3000 m steeplechase	9:50.17	13	—N/a				Did not advance	
Geneviève Lalonde	3000 m steeplechase	9:30.24 NR	4 q	—N/a				9:41.88	16
Erin Teschuk	3000 m steeplechase	9:53.70	16	—N/a				Did not advance	
Khamica Bingham; Crystal Emmanuel; Phylicia George; Farah Jacques	4 × 100 m relay	42.70	4 q	—N/a				43.15	7
Alicia Brown; Noelle Montcalm; Carline Muir; Sage Watson	4 × 400 m relay	3:24.94	3 Q	—N/a				3:26.43	4
Krista DuChene	Marathon	—N/a						2:35:29	35
Lanni Marchant	Marathon	—N/a						2:33:08	24

Field events
Men

Athlete	Event	Qualification		Final	
Athlete	Event	Distance	Position	Distance	Position
Derek Drouin	High jump	2.29	=1 q	2.38	1st place, gold medalist(s)
Michael Mason	High jump	2.26	=18	Did not advance	
Shawnacy Barber	Pole vault	5.70	7 q	5.50	10
Tim Nedow	Shot put	20.00	16	Did not advance	

Women

Athlete	Event	Qualification		Final	
Athlete	Event	Distance	Position	Distance	Position
Christabel Nettey	Long jump	6.37	12	Did not advance	
Alyxandria Treasure	High jump	1.94	10 Q	1.88	17
Kelsie Ahbe	Pole vault	4.55	5 q	4.50	12
Annika Newell	Pole vault	4.15	=17	Did not advance	
Alysha Newman	Pole vault	4.45	19	Did not advance	
Brittany Crew	Shot put	17.45	18	Did not advance	
Taryn Suttie	Shot put	16.74	28	Did not advance	
Elizabeth Gleadle	Javelin throw	60.28	9	Did not advance	
Heather Steacy	Hammer throw	66.01	23	Did not advance	

Combined events – Men's decathlon

Athlete	Event	100 m	LJ	SP	HJ	400 m	110H	DT	PV	JT	1500 m	Final	Rank
Damian Warner	Result	10.30	7.67	13.66	2.04	47.35	13.58	44.93	4.70	63.19	4:24.90	8666	3rd place, bronze medalist(s)
Damian Warner	Points	1023	977	708	840	941	1029	765	819	786	778	8666	3rd place, bronze medalist(s)

Combined events – Women's heptathlon

Athlete	Event	100H	HJ	SP	200 m	LJ	JT	800 m	Final	Rank
Brianne Theisen-Eaton	Result	13.18	1.86	13.45	24.18	6.48	47.36	2:09.50	6653	3rd place, bronze medalist(s)
Brianne Theisen-Eaton	Points	1097	1054	757	963	1001	809	972	6653	3rd place, bronze medalist(s)

Road standards

Men's events		Women's events	
Event	Entry mark	Event	Entry mark
Marathon	2:12:50	Marathon	2:29:50
20 km walk	1:21:55	20 km walk	1:31:35
50 km walk	3:54:20	—N/a	

== Badminton ==
Canada qualified two badminton players. London 2012 Olympian Michelle Li was selected among the thirty-four individual shuttlers in the women's singles based on the BWF World Rankings as of 5 May 2016, while Martin Giuffre picked up one of the spare athlete berths (from athletes starting in both singles and a double event) as the next highest-ranked eligible player in the men's singles. The team was officially named on July 23, 2016.

Athlete	Event	Group Stage			Elimination	Quarterfinal	Semifinal	Final / BM	
Athlete	Event	Opposition Score	Opposition Score	Rank	Opposition Score	Opposition Score	Opposition Score	Opposition Score	Rank
Martin Giuffre	Men's singles	Ng K L (HKG); L (11–21, 14–21)	Martins (POR); W (14–21, 24–22, 21–6)	2	Did not advance				
Michelle Li	Women's singles	Sárosi (HUN); W (21–11, 21–8)	Sindhu (IND); L (21–19, 15–21, 17–21)	2	Did not advance				

== Basketball ==
=== Women's tournament ===
Canada's women's basketball team qualified for the Olympics by winning the 2015 FIBA Americas Championships in Edmonton.

Team roster

The following was the Canada roster in the women's basketball tournament of the 2016 Summer Olympics.

Canada women's national basketball team – 2016 Summer Olympics roster
Players
Coaches

Pos.	No.	Name	Age – Date of birth	Height	Club	Ctr.
G	4	Miah-Marie Langlois	24 – 21 September 1991	1.70 m (5 ft 7 in)	Dynamo Guvd Novosibirsk	(Russia)
G	5	Kia Nurse	20 – 22 February 1996	1.77 m (5 ft 10 in)	Connecticut Huskies	(United States)
G	6	Shona Thorburn	33 – 7 August 1982	1.75 m (5 ft 9 in)	Nantes Reze Basket	(France)
F	7	Nayo Raincock-Ekunwe	25 – 2 August 1991	1.87 m (6 ft 2 in)	Bendigo Spirit	(Australia)
G	8	Kim Gaucher	32 – 7 May 1984	1.80 m (5 ft 11 in)	Basket Lattes	(France)
F	9	Miranda Ayim	28 – 6 May 1988	1.87 m (6 ft 2 in)	Basket Landres	(France)
G	10	Nirra Fields	22 – 3 December 1993	1.70 m (5 ft 7 in)	Phoenix Mercury	(United States)
F	11	Natalie Achonwa	23 – 22 November 1992	1.90 m (6 ft 3 in)	Indiana Fever	(United States)
F	12	Lizanne Murphy	32 – 15 March 1984	1.82 m (6 ft 0 in)	UF Angers Basket	(France)
F	13	Tamara Tatham	30 – 19 August 1985	1.82 m (6 ft 0 in)	Dynamo Guvd Novosibirsk	(Russia)
F	14	Katherine Plouffe	23 – 15 September 1992	1.90 m (6 ft 3 in)	Nantes Reze Basket	(France)
F	15	Michelle Plouffe	23 – 15 September 1992	1.90 m (6 ft 3 in)	Basket Lattes	(France)

Head coach

- (Canada) Lisa Thomaidis

Assistant coach(es)

- (Canada) Shawnee Harle
- (Canada) Bev Smith

Legend

- (C) Team captain
- Club – describes last
  club before the tournament
- Age – describes age
  on 6 August 2016

Group play

Pos	Team	Pld	W	L	PF	PA	PD	Pts	Qualification
1	United States	5	5	0	520	316	+204	10	Quarter-finals
2	Spain	5	4	1	387	333	+54	9	Quarter-finals
3	Canada	5	3	2	340	347	−7	8	Quarter-finals
4	Serbia	5	2	3	385	406	−21	7	Quarter-finals
5	China	5	1	4	371	428	−57	6	
6	Senegal	5	0	5	309	482	−173	5	

Source: FIBA
Rules for classification: 1) points; 2) head-to-head points; 3) head-to-head points difference; 4) head-to-head number of points scored.

6 August 2016
14:15

Boxscore

China	68–90	Canada
Scoring by quarter: 9–19, 17–18, 20–23, 22–30
Pts: Chen N. 13; Rebs: Sun Mengr. 5 Asts: Chen X., Sun Mengx. 3		Pts: Tatham 20; Rebs: Gaucher 10; Asts: Gaucher 7

Youth Arena, Rio de Janeiro
Attendance: 2,314
Referees: Juan Carlos García (ESP), Carlos Júlio (ANG), Anne Panther (GER)

8 August 2016
14:15

Boxscore

Canada	71–67	Serbia
Scoring by quarter: 21–21, 11–19, 13–17, 26–10
Pts: Nurse 25; Rebs: Raincock-Ekunwe 9 Asts: Langolis, Nurse 5		Pts: Milovanović 19; Rebs: Page 6 Asts: A. Dabović 5

Youth Arena, Rio de Janeiro
Attendance: 2,377
Referees: Robert Lottermoser (GER), Vaughan Mayberry (AUS), Hwang In-tae (KOR)

10 August 2016
17:45

Boxscore

Senegal	58–68	Canada
Scoring by quarter: 10–17, 14–16, 17–22, 17–13
Pts: Traore 24; Rebs: Diarra 9 Asts: Diémé 6		Pts: Nurse 14; Rebs: Tatham 10; Asts: Langolis 6

Youth Arena, Rio de Janeiro
Attendance: 2,640
Referees: Anne Panther (GER), Carlos Júlio (ANG), Ahmed Al-Bulushi (OMA)

12 August 2016
15:30

Boxscore

Canada	51–81	United States
Scoring by quarter: 16–18, 6–18, 14–24, 15–21
Pts: Ayim 8 Rebs: Raincock-Ekunwe 8 Asts: Langlois, Tatham 3		Pts: Moore, Taurasi 12; Rebs: Moore 8 Asts: Bird 9

Youth Arena, Rio de Janeiro
Attendance: 3,138
Referees: Eddie Viator (FRA), Vaughan Mayberry (AUS), Ahmed Al-Bulushi (OMA)

14 August 2016
17:45

Boxscore

Spain	73–60	Canada
Scoring by quarter: 17–16, 16–13, 16–18, 24–13
Pts: Torrens 20; Rebs: Nicholls 12; Asts: Palau 6		Pts: Fields 13; Rebs: Achonwa, Raincock-Ekunwe 7 Asts: three players 2

Youth Arena, Rio de Janeiro
Attendance: 3,026
Referees: Cristiano Maranho (BRA), Vaughan Mayberry (AUS), Natalia Cuello (DOM)

Quarterfinals

16 August 2016
22:15

Boxscore

France	68–63	Canada
Scoring by quarter: 16–25, 16–12, 18–13, 18–13
Pts: Gruda 14; Rebs: Gruda 10; Asts: Époupa 6		Pts: Gaucher 15; Rebs: three players 5 Asts: Tatham 4

Carioca Arena 1, Rio de Janeiro
Attendance: 7,200
Referees: Sreten Radović (CRO), Vaughan Mayberry (AUS), Hwang In-tae (KOR)

== Boxing ==
Canada qulifieed three boxers. Arthur Biyarslanov, Mandy Bujold, and Ariane Fortin secured their spots on the team at the 2016 American Qualification Tournament in Buenos Aires, Argentina. The full team was officially nominated on July 14, 2016.

Athlete	Event	Round of 32	Round of 16	Quarterfinals	Semifinals	Final	
Athlete	Event	Opposition Result	Opposition Result	Opposition Result	Opposition Result	Opposition Result	Rank
Arthur Biyarslanov	Men's light welterweight	Al-Kasbeh (JOR); W 3–0	Harutyunyan (GER); L 0–2	Did not advance			
Mandy Bujold	Women's flyweight	—N/a	Mirzaeva (UZB); W 3–0	Ren Cc (CHN); L 0–3	Did not advance		
Ariane Fortin	Women's middleweight	—N/a	Shakimova (KAZ); L 1–2	Did not advance			

== Canoeing ==
Canada's canoeing and kayaking team consisted of eleven athletes (seven men and four women).

=== Slalom ===
Two Canadian canoeists qualified a maximum of one boat in each of the following classes through the 2015 Pan American Games. The team was selected based on the slalom canoeists' performances from the National trials in May 2016 along with stages two and three of the ICF World Cup series in La Seu d'Urgell and Pau (both held on the second and third week of June 2016). The team was officially named on June 10, 2016.

Athlete	Event	Preliminary						Semifinal		Final	
Athlete	Event	Run 1	Rank	Run 2	Rank	Best	Rank	Time	Rank	Time	Rank
Cameron Smedley	Men's C-1	104.93	12	104.83	13	104.83	15	Did not advance			
Michael Tayler	Men's K-1	105.66	19	93.47	12	93.47	16	Did not advance			

=== Sprint ===
Canadian canoeists/kayakers qualified two boats in the men's K-1 200 and women's K-1 500 m through the 2015 ICF Canoe Sprint World Championships. Meanwhile, all other boats earned their spots at the 2016 Pan American Sprint Qualifier in Gainesville, Georgia, United States, either by winning their event or when the quota place for their event passed to the highest finisher not qualified. Andréanne Langlois was officially nominated to the team on June 20, 2016. The full team was officially nominated on June 27, 2016. On July 29, 2016, Canoe Kayak Canada announced that it received two additional athlete quotas for the men's K-2 200 m event, following the suspension of the Russian kayakers. On August 1, 2016, both Ryan Cochrane and Hugues Fournel were named to the team in the men's K-2 200 m event.

Men

Athlete	Event	Heats		Semifinals		Final	
Athlete	Event	Time	Rank	Time	Rank	Time	Rank
Mark de Jonge	K-1 200 m	34.898	3 Q	34.775	4 FA	36.080	7
Mark Oldershaw	C-1 200 m	42.972	4 Q	43.357	7	Did not advance	
Ryan Cochrane; Hugues Fournel	K-2 200 m	32.749	4 Q	33.494	3 FA	33.767	8
Mark Oldershaw	C-1 1000 m	4:13.600	3 Q	4:03.493	4 FB	4:06.972	11
Adam van Koeverden	K-1 1000 m	3:37.212	3 Q	3:36.230	6 FB	3:31.872	9

Women

Athlete	Event	Heats		Semifinals		Final	
Athlete	Event	Time	Rank	Time	Rank	Time	Rank
Andréanne Langlois	K-1 200 m	40.956	3 Q	41.350	5 FB	42.099	14
Émilie Fournel	K-1 500 m	1:53.670	2 Q	1:59.638	7	Did not advance	
Kathleen Fraser; Genevieve Orton	K-2 500 m	1:46.148	6 Q	1:45.351	5 FB	1:49.389	13
Émilie Fournel; Kathleen Fraser; Andréanne Langlois; Genevieve Orton	K-4 500 m	1:34.269	4 Q	1:36.254	=2 FA	1:40.733	8

Qualification Legend: FA = Qualify to final (medal); FB = Qualify to final B (non-medal)

== Cycling ==
Canada qualified a total of 19 cyclists (7 men and 12 women). The full team was officially announced on June 29, 2016.

=== Road ===
Canadian riders qualified six quota spots (3 per gender) with their top five national ranking in the 2015 UCI America Tour (for men) and top 12 in the UCI World Ranking (for women).

Men

Athlete	Event	Time	Rank
Antoine Duchesne	Road race	Did not finish	
Hugo Houle	Road race	Did not finish	
Hugo Houle	Time trial	1:17:02.04	21
Michael Woods	Road race	6:30:05	55

Women

Athlete	Event	Time	Rank
Karol-Ann Canuel	Road race	3:56:34	25
Karol-Ann Canuel	Time trial	46:30.93	13
Leah Kirchmann	Road race	4:01:29	38
Tara Whitten	Road race	Did not finish	
Tara Whitten	Time trial	45:01.16	7

=== Track ===
A total of eight Canadian track cyclists qualified. Following the completion of the 2016 UCI Track Cycling World Championships, Canadian riders accumulated spots in the women's team sprint and team pursuit, as well as the women's omnium. As a result of their place in the women's team sprint, Canada won the right to enter two riders in both women's sprint and women's keirin. Therefore, Canada were permitted to enter the maximum team size of 7 women. Although Canada failed to win a quota place in the men's team sprint, they managed to secure a single berth in the men's keirin, with their final individual UCI Olympic ranking in that event.

Sprint

Athlete	Event	Qualification		Round 1	Repechage 1	Round 2	Repechage 2	Quarterfinals	Semifinals	Final	
Athlete	Event	Time Speed (km/h)	Rank	Opposition Time Speed (km/h)	Opposition Time Speed (km/h)	Opposition Time Speed (km/h)	Opposition Time Speed (km/h)	Opposition Time Speed (km/h)	Opposition Time Speed (km/h)	Opposition Time Speed (km/h)	Rank
Kate O'Brien	Women's sprint	11.020; 65.335	12 Q	Hansen (NZL); L	Sullivan (CAN); Welte (GER); L	Did not advance					
Monique Sullivan	Women's sprint	11.143; 64.614	17 Q	Marchant (GBR); L	O'Brien (CAN); Welte (GER); L	Did not advance					

Team sprint

Athlete	Event	Qualification		Semifinals		Final	
Athlete	Event	Time Speed (km/h)	Rank	Opposition Time Speed (km/h)	Rank	Opposition Time Speed (km/h)	Rank
Kate O'Brien; Monique Sullivan	Women's team sprint	33.735; 53.357	7 Q	Russia; L 33.684; 53.437	7	Did not advance	

Pursuit

Athlete	Event	Qualification		Semifinals		Final	
Athlete	Event	Time	Rank	Opponent results	Rank	Opponent results	Rank
Allison Beveridge; Jasmin Glaesser; Kirsti Lay; Georgia Simmerling; Laura Brown	Women's team pursuit	4:19.599	4 Q	Great Britain; 4:15.636 NR	3	New Zealand; 4:14.627 NR	3rd place, bronze medalist(s)

Keirin

Athlete	Event	1st Round	Repechage	2nd Round	Final
Athlete	Event	Rank	Rank	Rank	Rank
Hugo Barrette	Men's keirin	4 R	2	Did not advance	
Kate O'Brien	Women's keirin	6 R	2	Did not advance	
Monique Sullivan	Women's keirin	6 R	5	Did not advance	

Omnium

Athlete	Event	Scratch race		Individual pursuit			Elimination race		Time trial			Flying lap			Points race		Total points	Rank
Athlete	Event	Rank	Points	Time	Rank	Points	Rank	Points	Time	Rank	Points	Time	Rank	Points	Points	Rank	Total points	Rank
Allison Beveridge	Women's omnium	15	14	3:36.938	9	24	14	12	36.247	9	24	14.140	6	30	0	17	168	11

=== Mountain biking ===
Canadian mountain bikers qualified for two men's and two women's quota places, as result of the nation's tenth-place finish for men and third for women, respectively, in the UCI Olympic Ranking List of May 25, 2016.

Athlete	Event	Time	Rank
Léandre Bouchard	Men's cross-country	1:42:43	27
Raphaël Gagné	Men's cross-country	LAP (2 laps)	43
Emily Batty	Women's cross-country	1:31:43	4
Catharine Pendrel	Women's cross-country	1:31:41	3rd place, bronze medalist(s)

=== BMX ===
Canadian riders qualified for one men's quota place in BMX at the Olympics, as a result of the nation's tenth-place finish in the UCI Olympic Ranking List of May 31, 2016. BMX rider and London 2012 Olympian Tory Nyhaug was among the cyclists named to Canada's Olympic team on June 29, 2016.

Athlete	Event	Seeding		Quarterfinal		Semifinal		Final	
Athlete	Event	Result	Rank	Points	Rank	Points	Rank	Result	Rank
Tory Nyhaug	Men's BMX	35.422	18	4	1 Q	12	4 Q	35.657	5

== Diving ==
Canadian divers qualified for the following individual spots and the synchronized teams at the Olympics through the 2015 FINA World Championships, the 2015 Pan American Games, and the 2016 FINA World Cup series. The diving team was officially named to the Olympic roster on June 13, 2016, featuring London 2012 bronze medallists Meaghan Benfeito and Roseline Filion. Maxim Bouchard was added to the team on June 28, 2016, after Canada received an additional quota place from FINA.

Men

Athlete	Event	Preliminaries		Semifinals		Final	
Athlete	Event	Points	Rank	Points	Rank	Points	Rank
Philippe Gagné	3 m springboard	400.75	12 Q	445.40	5 Q	425.30	11
Maxim Bouchard	10 m platform	398.15	19	Did not advance			
Vincent Riendeau	10 m platform	419.50	14 Q	436.30	14	did not advance	

Women

Athlete	Event	Preliminaries		Semifinals		Final	
Athlete	Event	Points	Rank	Points	Rank	Points	Rank
Jennifer Abel	3 m springboard	373.00	1 Q	343.45	3 Q	367.25	4
Pamela Ware	3 m springboard	329.10	7 Q	318.25	9 Q	323.15	7
Meaghan Benfeito	10 m platform	329.15	7 Q	332.80	9 Q	389.20	3rd place, bronze medalist(s)
Roseline Filion	10 m platform	323.55	9 Q	336.80	7 Q	367.95	6
Jennifer Abel; Pamela Ware	3 m synchronized springboard	—N/a				298.32	4
Meaghan Benfeito; Roseline Filion	10 m synchronized platform	—N/a				336.18	3rd place, bronze medalist(s)

== Equestrian ==
Canadian equestrian riders qualified a full squad in the team eventing and jumping competitions through the 2014 FEI World Equestrian Games and the 2015 Pan American Games respectively. Two dressage riders also qualified with a top finish from each of the individual FEI Olympic rankings (for North America) and the 2015 Pan American Games. The full team of 10 athletes was officially named on July 14, 2016.

=== Dressage ===
The Canadian team was nominated using the average of the top four results from January 1, 2016, to July 3, 2016.

Athlete	Horse	Event	Grand Prix		Grand Prix Special		Grand Prix Freestyle		Overall	
Athlete	Horse	Event	Score	Rank	Score	Rank	Technical	Artistic	Score	Rank
Megan Lane	Caravella	Individual	71.286	32	Did not advance					
Belinda Trussell	Anton	Individual	72.214	28 Q	72.325	27	Did not advance			

=== Eventing ===
On July 29, 2016, it was announced Selena O'Hanlon was withdrawn from the eventing team (due to an injury of her horse Foxwood High, and replaced with Kathryn Robinson and Let It Bee).

Athlete	Horse	Event	Dressage		Cross-country			Jumping						Total	
Athlete	Horse	Event	Dressage		Cross-country			Qualifier			Final			Total	
Athlete	Horse	Event	Penalties	Rank	Penalties	Total	Rank	Penalties	Total	Rank	Penalties	Total	Rank	Penalties	Rank
Rebecca Howard	Riddle Master	Individual	49.40	41	12.40	61.80	15	0.00	61.80	10	4.00	65.80	10	65.80	10
Colleen Loach	Qorry Blue d'Argouges	Individual	56.50 #	57	85.20	141.70	45	4.00	145.70	42	Did not advance				
Kathryn Robinson	Let It Bee	Individual	49.40	41	Eliminated			Did not advance							
Jessica Phoenix	A Little Romance	Individual	52.00	50	75.60	127.60	41	4.00	131.60	38	Did not advance				
Rebecca Howard; Colleen Loach; Kathryn Robinson; Jessica Phoenix	See above	Team	150.80	12	331.10	482.50	11	339.10	821	10	—N/a			821	10

"#" indicates that the score of this rider does not count in the team competition, since only the best three results of a team are counted.

=== Jumping ===
The team did not include Ian Millar, who was looking to make a record eleventh appearance at the Summer Olympics. Millar's horse was injured earlier in the year and therefore could not compete. His daughter Amy, made her Olympic debut.

Athlete	Horse	Event	Qualification								Final					Total	
Athlete	Horse	Event	Round 1		Round 2			Round 3			Round A		Round B			Total	
Athlete	Horse	Event	Penalties	Rank	Penalties	Total	Rank	Penalties	Total	Rank	Penalties	Rank	Penalties	Total	Rank	Penalties	Rank
Yann Candele	First Choice 15	Individual	4 #	=27	0	4	=15	4	8	=18 Q	12	=32	Did not advance			12	32
Tiffany Foster	Tripple X III	Individual	4	=27	4	8	=30	0	8	=18 Q	4	=16 Q	17	21	26	21	26
Eric Lamaze	Fine Lady 5	Individual	0	=1	0	0	=1	0	0	1 Q	0	=1 Q	0	0	=1 JO	4	3rd place, bronze medalist(s)
Amy Millar	Heros	Individual	0	=1	5 #	5	=26	12 #	17	=38	Did not advance						
Yann Candele; Tiffany Foster; Eric Lamaze; Amy Millar	See above	Team	4*	=3	4	4	6	4	8	=3 JO	—N/a					8	4

"#" indicates that the score of this rider does not count in the team competition, since only the best three results of a team are counted.
* penalties for the first day of team jumping will not be carried into the second round.

== Fencing ==
Canada qualified five fencers. Joseph Polossifakis and Eleanor Harvey secured a spot on the Canadian team with a top two placement from the America region outside the world's top 14 in the FIE Adjusted Official Rankings, while Maxime Brinck-Croteau, Leonora MacKinnon, and Maximilien van Haaster were one of the two highest-ranked fencers from the America zone, not already qualified. The team was officially named on May 24, 2016.

Athlete	Event	Round of 64	Round of 32	Round of 16	Quarterfinal	Semifinal	Final / BM	
Athlete	Event	Opposition Score	Opposition Score	Opposition Score	Opposition Score	Opposition Score	Opposition Score	Rank
Maxime Brinck-Croteau	Men's épée	Bye	Anokhin (RUS); L 14–15	Did not advance				
Maximilien van Haaster	Men's foil	Leal (VEN); W 15–7	Meinhardt (USA); L 4–15	Did not advance				
Joseph Polossifakis	Men's sabre	Bye	Buikevich (BLR); L 6–15	Did not advance				
Leonora MacKinnon	Women's épée	Pop (ROU); W 15–10	Fiamingo (ITA); L 8–15	Did not advance				
Eleanor Harvey	Women's foil	Bye	Khelfaoui (ALG); W 15–6	Errigo (ITA); W 15–11	Boubakri (TUN); L 13–15	Did not advance		

== Field hockey ==
=== Men's tournament ===
Canada men's field hockey team qualified for the Olympics by having achieved a top four finish at the 2014–15 Men's FIH Hockey World League Semifinals.

Team roster

The following was the Canada roster in the men's field hockey tournament of the 2016 Summer Olympics. The roster consisted of 16 athletes.

Head coach: Anthony Farry

2. Benjamin Martin
4. Scott Tupper (C)
5. Devohn Noronha-Teixeira
7. Gabriel Ho-Garcia
10. Keegan Pereira
11. Jagdish Gill
14. Adam Froese
16. Gordon Johnston
17. Brenden Bissett
19. Mark Pearson
21. Matthew Sarmento
23. Iain Smythe
26. Matthew Guest
27. Sukhi Panesar
29. Taylor Curran
30. David Carter (GK)

Group play

Pos	Team	Pld	W	D	L	GF	GA	GD	Pts	Qualification
1	Germany	5	4	1	0	17	10	+7	13	Quarter-finals
2	Netherlands	5	3	1	1	18	6	+12	10	Quarter-finals
3	Argentina	5	2	2	1	14	12	+2	8	Quarter-finals
4	India	5	2	1	2	9	9	0	7	Quarter-finals
5	Ireland	5	1	0	4	10	16	−6	3	
6	Canada	5	0	1	4	7	22	−15	1	

Source: Rio2016
Rules for classification: 1) Points; 2) Matches won; 3) Goal difference; 4) Goals for; 5) Head-to-head result.

6 August 2016
18:00

Canada	2–6	Germany
Pearson 11'; Pereira 39'	Report	Fürste 4', 33'; Wellen 6', 46'; Müller 14'; Butt 26'

Umpires:
Marcelo Servetto (ESP)
Simon Taylor (NZL)

8 August 2016
12:30

Canada	1–3	Argentina
Tupper 55'	Report	Paredes 13'; Peillat 46', 51'

Umpires:
Adam Kearns (AUS)
Simon Taylor (NZL)

9 August 2016
13:30

Netherlands	7–0	Canada
Van Ass 9'; Van der Weerden 25', 52', 60'; Hertzberger 29', 36'; Kemperman 58'	Report

Umpires:
Murray Grime (AUS)
Nathan Stagno (GBR)

11 August 2016
11:00

Ireland	4–2	Canada
O'Donoghue 1', 28'; Caruth 29'; Darling 57'	Report	Tupper 37', 50'

Umpires:
Marcelo Servetto (ESP)
Nathan Stagno (GBR)

12 August 2016
12:30

India	2–2	Canada
A. Singh 33'; Ra. Singh 41'	Report	Tupper 33', 52'

Umpires:
Nathan Stagno (GBR)
Adam Kearns (AUS)

Summary

Key:

- FT – After full time.
- P – Match decided by penalty-shootout.

Team	Event	Group Stage						Quarterfinal	Semifinal	Final / BM	
Team	Event	Opposition Score	Opposition Score	Opposition Score	Opposition Score	Opposition Score	Rank	Opposition Score	Opposition Score	Opposition Score	Rank
Canada men's	Men's tournament	Germany; L 2–6	Argentina; L 1–3	Netherlands; L 0–7	Ireland; L 2–4	India; D 2–2	6	Did not advance			11

== Football (soccer) ==
=== Women's tournament ===
Canada women's football team qualified for the Olympics with second-place finish at the 2016 CONCACAF Olympic Qualifying Championship in Houston, Texas.

Team roster

Head coach: (United Kingdom) John Herdman

Canada named a squad of 18 players and 4 alternates for the tournament, which was announced on 20 June 2016.

No.	Pos.	Player	Date of birth (age)	Caps	Goals	Club
1	GK	Stephanie Labbé	10 October 1986 (aged 29)	34	0	(United States Soccer Federation) Washington Spirit
2	DF	Allysha Chapman	25 January 1989 (aged 27)	32	1	(United States Soccer Federation) Houston Dash
3	DF	Kadeisha Buchanan	5 November 1995 (aged 20)	60	3	(United States Soccer Federation) West Virginia University
4	DF	Shelina Zadorsky	24 August 1992 (aged 23)	20	3	(United States Soccer Federation) Washington Spirit
5	MF	Quinn	11 August 1995 (aged 20)	25	3	(United States Soccer Federation) Duke University
6	FW	Deanne Rose	3 March 1999 (aged 17)	12	3	(Canadian Soccer Association) Scarborough GS United
7	DF	Rhian Wilkinson	12 May 1982 (aged 34)	175	7	Unattached
8	MF	Diana Matheson	6 April 1984 (aged 32)	183	17	(United States Soccer Federation) Washington Spirit
9	DF	Josée Bélanger	14 May 1986 (aged 30)	50	7	(United States Soccer Federation) Orlando Pride
10	DF	Ashley Lawrence	11 June 1995 (aged 21)	42	4	(United States Soccer Federation) West Virginia University
11	MF	Desiree Scott	31 July 1987 (aged 29)	110	0	(United States Soccer Federation) FC Kansas City
12	FW	Christine Sinclair (captain)	12 June 1983 (aged 33)	243	162	(United States Soccer Federation) Portland Thorns
13	MF	Sophie Schmidt	28 June 1988 (aged 28)	149	16	(German Football Association) 1. FFC Frankfurt
14	FW	Melissa Tancredi	27 December 1981 (aged 34)	118	25	(Swedish Football Association) KIF Örebro
15	FW	Nichelle Prince	19 February 1995 (aged 21)	16	6	(United States Soccer Federation) Ohio State University
16	FW	Janine Beckie	20 August 1994 (aged 21)	23	10	(United States Soccer Federation) Houston Dash
17	MF	Jessie Fleming	11 March 1998 (aged 18)	33	3	(United States Soccer Federation) University of California, Los Angeles
18	GK	Sabrina D'Angelo	11 May 1993 (aged 23)	2	0	(United States Soccer Federation) Western New York Flash

Group play

Pos	Team	Pld	W	D	L	GF	GA	GD	Pts	Qualification
1	Canada	3	3	0	0	7	2	+5	9	Quarter-finals
2	Germany	3	1	1	1	9	5	+4	4	Quarter-finals
3	Australia	3	1	1	1	8	5	+3	4	Quarter-finals
4	Zimbabwe	3	0	0	3	3	15	−12	0	

Source: Rio2016 & FIFA
Rules for classification: Tiebreakers
3 August 2016
15:00

Canada	2–0	Australia
Beckie 1'; Sinclair 80'	Report (Rio2016); Report (FIFA)

Arena Corinthians, São Paulo
Attendance: 20,521
Referee: Stéphanie Frappart (France)

6 August 2016
15:00

Canada	3–1	Zimbabwe
Beckie 7', 35'; Sinclair 19' (pen.)	Report (Rio2016); Report (FIFA)	Chirandu 86'

Arena Corinthians, São Paulo
Attendance: 30,295
Referee: Olga Miranda (Paraguay)

9 August 2016
16:00

Australia	6–1	Zimbabwe
De Vanna 2'; Polkinghorne 15'; Kennedy 37'; Simon 50'; Heyman 55', 66'	Report (Rio2016); Report (FIFA)	Msipa 90+1'

Itaipava Arena Fonte Nova, Salvador
Attendance: 5,115
Referee: Esther Staubli (Switzerland)

Quarterfinal

12 August 2016
19:00

Canada	1–0	France
Schmidt 56'	Report (Rio2016); Report (FIFA)

Arena Corinthians, São Paulo
Attendance: 38,688
Referee: Claudia Umpierrez (Uruguay)

Semifinal

16 August 2016
16:00

Canada	0–2	Germany
	Report (Rio2016); Report (FIFA)	Behringer 21' (pen.); Däbritz 59'

Mineirão, Belo Horizonte
Attendance: 5,641
Referee: Ri Hyang-ok (North Korea)

Bronze medal match

19 August 2016
13:00

Brazil	1–2	Canada
Beatriz 79'	Report (Rio2016); Report (FIFA)	Rose 25'; Sinclair 52'

Arena Corinthians, São Paulo
Attendance: 39,718
Referee: Teodora Albon (Romania)

== Golf ==
Canada qualified four golfers (two per gender). Graham DeLaet (world no. 148), David Hearn (world no. 127), Brooke Henderson (world no. 2), and Alena Sharp (world no. 91) qualified directly among the top 60 eligible players for their respective individual events based on the IGF World Rankings as of 11 July 2016.

Athlete	Event	Round 1	Round 2	Round 3	Round 4	Total		
Athlete	Event	Score	Score	Score	Score	Score	Par	Rank
Graham DeLaet	Men's	66	71	74	69	280	−4	20
David Hearn	Men's	73	70	74	66	283	−1	30
Brooke Henderson	Women's	70	64	75	67	276	−8	7
Alena Sharp	Women's	72	69	75	69	285	+1	30

== Gymnastics ==
=== Artistic ===
Canada fielded a team of six artistic gymnasts (one man and five women). The women's team qualified through a top eight finish at the 2015 World Artistic Gymnastics Championships in Glasgow. Meanwhile, Canada claimed one male quota place in the apparatus and all-around events at the Olympic Test Event in Rio de Janeiro. The team was officially unveiled on June 30, 2016.

Men

Athlete	Event	Qualification								Final							
Athlete	Event	Apparatus						Total	Rank	Apparatus						Total	Rank
Athlete	Event	F	PH	R	V	PB	HB	Total	Rank	F	PH	R	V	PB	HB	Total	Rank
Scott Morgan	Floor	14.966	—N/a					14.966	18	did not advance							
Scott Morgan	Rings	—N/a		14.533	—N/a			14.533	27	did not advance							
Scott Morgan	Vault	—N/a			14.470	—N/a		14.470	14	did not advance							

Women
Team

Athlete	Event	Qualification						Final					
Athlete	Event	Apparatus				Total	Rank	Apparatus				Total	Rank
Athlete	Event	V	UB	BB	F	Total	Rank	V	UB	BB	F	Total	Rank
Ellie Black	Team	14.499	14.500	13.566	14.133	56.965	13 Q	did not advance					
Shallon Olsen	Team	14.950 Q	—N/a		13.866	—N/a		did not advance					
Isabela Onyshko	Team	14.000	14.733	14.533 Q	13.966	57.232	10 Q	did not advance					
Brittany Rogers	Team	14.666	14.266	13.466	—N/a			did not advance					
Rose-Kaying Woo	Team	—N/a	13.733	13.233	13.566	—N/a		did not advance					
Total	Team	44.732	43.499	41.565	41.965	171.761	9	did not advance					

Individual finals

Athlete	Event	Apparatus				Total	Rank
Athlete	Event	V	UB	BB	F	Total	Rank
Ellie Black	All-around	14.866	14.500	14.566	14.366	58.298	5
Isabela Onyshko	All-around	13.933	14.166	14.366	13.900	56.365	18
Isabela Onyshko	Balance beam	—N/a				13.400	8
Shallon Olsen	Vault	—N/a				14.816	8

=== Trampoline ===
Canada qualified one gymnast in the women's trampoline with a top eight finish at the 2015 World Championships in Odense, Denmark. Meanwhile, an additional Olympic berth was awarded to Jason Burnett, who finished in the top six at the 2016 Olympic Test Event in Rio de Janeiro. The team was officially unveiled on June 30, 2016.

Athlete	Event	Qualification		Final	
Athlete	Event	Score	Rank	Score	Rank
Jason Burnett	Men's	103.715	14	did not advance	
Rosannagh MacLennan	Women's	103.130	3 Q	56.465	1st place, gold medalist(s)

== Judo ==
Canada qualified a total of seven judokas for the following weight classes at the Games. Six of them (four men and two women), including London 2012 bronze medallist Antoine Valois-Fortier, were ranked among the top 22 eligible judokas for men and top 14 for women in the IJF World Ranking List of May 30, 2016, while Ecaterina Guica at women's half-lightweight (52 kg) earned a continental quota spot from the Pan American region as Canada's top-ranked judoka outside of direct qualifying position. The team was officially unveiled on June 28, 2016. Arthur Margelidon (73 kg) also qualified as being part of the top 22 eligible judokas in the world rankings, however had to withdraw after breaking his forearm in training.

Men

Athlete	Event	Round of 64	Round of 32	Round of 16	Quarterfinals	Semifinals	Repechage	Final / BM	
Athlete	Event	Opposition Result	Opposition Result	Opposition Result	Opposition Result	Opposition Result	Opposition Result	Opposition Result	Rank
Sérgio Pessoa	−60 kg	Bye	Papinashvili (GEO); L 000–001 UMA	did not advance					
Antoine Bouchard	−66 kg	Ovinou (PNG); W 100–000 UMA	Pulyaev (RUS); W 001–000 SGA	Bassou (MAR); W 001–000 SGA	Gomboč (SLO); L 000–100	Did not advance	Davaadorj (MGL); W 010–000	Ebinuma (JPN); L 000–101	5
Antoine Valois-Fortier	−81 kg	Bye	Pietri (FRA); W 100–001 SOT	Lucenti (ARG); W 010–010 S	Khalmurzaev (RUS); L 000–010 KGA	Did not advance	Nagase (JPN); L 000–100 SOT	Did not advance	7
Kyle Reyes	−100 kg	Bye	Grol (NED); L 000–101 KGA	did not advance					

Women

Athlete	Event	Round of 32	Round of 16	Quarterfinals	Semifinals	Repechage	Final / BM	
Athlete	Event	Opposition Result	Opposition Result	Opposition Result	Opposition Result	Opposition Result	Opposition Result	Rank
Ecaterina Guica	−52 kg	Bye	Kuziutina (RUS); L 000–000 S	did not advance				
Catherine Beauchemin-Pinard	−57 kg	Bye	Karakas (HUN); L 000–000 S	did not advance				
Kelita Zupancic	−70 kg	Bye	Stam (GEO); W 000–000 S	Tachimoto (JPN); L 000–010	Did not advance	Graf (AUT); L 001–010	Did not advance	7

== Modern pentathlon ==
Canadian athletes qualified two quota spots in the women's event. Donna Vakalis secured a selection in the women's event after obtaining a top five finish at the 2015 Pan American Games. Melanie McCann qualified through the world rankings as one of the top 8 athletes not yet qualified as of June 1, 2016.

Athlete	Event	Fencing (épée one touch)				Swimming (200 m freestyle)			Riding (show jumping)			Combined: shooting/running (10 m air pistol)/(3200 m)			Total points	Final rank
Athlete	Event	RR	BR	Rank	MP points	Time	Rank	MP points	Penalties	Rank	MP points	Time	Rank	MP Points	Total points	Final rank
Melanie McCann	Women's	23–12	2	3	240	2:20.81	26	278	0	3	300	13:42.43	32	478	1296	16
Donna Vakalis	Women's	22–13	1	5	233	2:22.12	31	274	EL	=31	0	13:36.19	31	484	991	33

== Rowing ==
Canada qualified a total of seven boats (26 rowers). Six rowing crews confirmed Olympic places for their boats at the 2015 FISA World Championships in Lac d'Aiguebelette, France, while the rowers competing in the men's quadruple sculls were further added to the Canadian roster with their top two finish at the 2016 European & Final Qualification Regatta in Lucerne, Switzerland. The full team was announced on June 28, 2016.

Rowing Canada decided not to enter a men's eight boat (the defending Olympic silver medallist and current world record holder) in the hopes of qualifying more competitive boats (and winning more medals).

Men

Athlete	Event	Heats		Repechage		Semifinals		Final	
Athlete	Event	Time	Rank	Time	Rank	Time	Rank	Time	Rank
Will Crothers; Kai Langerfeld; Conlin McCabe; Tim Schrijver	Four	5:58.26	2 SA/B	Bye		6:20.66	2 FA	6:15.93	6
Brendan Hodge; Maxwell Lattimer; Nicolas Pratt; Eric Woelfl	Lightweight four	6:19.44	4 R	6:05.35	4	did not advance			
Julien Bahain; Will Dean; Robert Gibson; Pascal Lussier	Quadruple sculls	6:34.55	5 R	5:56.28	5 FB	—N/a		6:13.55	8

Women

Athlete	Event	Heats		Repechage		Quarterfinals		Semifinals		Final	
Athlete	Event	Time	Rank	Time	Rank	Time	Rank	Time	Rank	Time	Rank
Carling Zeeman	Single sculls	8:41.12	1 QF	Bye		7:34.52	3 SA/B	7:54.07	4 FB	7:28.62	10
Nicole Hare; Jennifer Martins	Pair	7:22.99	4 R	8:01.09	4 FC	—N/a		Bye		8:26.03	14
Lindsay Jennerich; Patricia Obee	Lightweight double sculls	7:03.51	1 SA/B	Bye		—N/a		7:16.35	2 FA	7:05.88	2nd place, silver medalist(s)
Caileigh Filmer; Susanne Grainger; Natalie Mastracci; Cristy Nurse; Lisa Roman; Christine Roper; Antje von Seydlitz-Kurzbach; Lauren Wilkinson; Lesley Thompson-Willie (cox)	Eight	6:12.44	3 R	6:28.07	1 FA	—N/a				6:06.04	5

Qualification Legend: FA=Final A (medal); FB=Final B (non-medal); FC=Final C (non-medal); FD=Final D (non-medal); FE=Final E (non-medal); FF=Final F (non-medal); SA/B=Semifinals A/B; SC/D=Semifinals C/D; SE/F=Semifinals E/F; QF=Quarterfinals; R=Repechage
- Results given are within the heat.

== Rugby sevens ==
=== Women's tournament ===
The Canadian women's rugby sevens team (12 athletes) qualified for the Olympics by finishing in the top four of the 2014–15 Sevens World Series.

Team roster

The following was the Canada roster in the women's rugby sevens tournament of the 2016 Summer Olympics.

Head coach: John Tait

- Brittany Benn
- Hannah Darling
- Bianca Farella
- Jen Kish (C)
- Ghislaine Landry
- Megan Lukan
- Kayla Moleschi
- Karen Paquin
- Kelly Russell
- Ashley Steacy
- Natasha Watcham-Roy
- Charity Williams

Group play

Pos	Team	Pld	W	D	L	PF	PA	PD	Pts	Qualification
1	Great Britain	3	3	0	0	91	3	+88	9	Quarter-finals
2	Canada	3	2	0	1	83	22	+61	7	Quarter-finals
3	Brazil (H)	3	1	0	2	29	77	−48	5	
4	Japan	3	0	0	3	10	111	−101	3	

Source: World Rugby
Rules for classification: 1) Points; 2) Head-to-head result; 3) Point difference; 4) Points scored.
(H) Hosts

6 August 2016
12:30

Canada	45–0	Japan
Try: Landry (2) 1' c, 6' c Moleschi 3' c Farella (2) 4' m, 9' m Benn 13' c Watcham-Roy 14' c Con: Landry (3/4); Russell (2/3)	Report (Rio 2016); Report (World Rugby)

Deodoro Stadium, Rio de Janeiro
Referee: James Bolabiu (Fiji)

6 August 2016
17:30

Canada	38–0	Brazil
Try: Paquin (2) 1' c, 7' c Kish 5' m Moleschi 6' c Farella (2) 12' c, 17' m Con: Russell (3/4); Landry (1/2)	Report (Rio 2016); Report (World Rugby)

Deodoro Stadium, Rio de Janeiro
Referee: Amy Perrett (Australia)

7 August 2016
12:30

Canada	0–22	Great Britain
	Report (Rio 2016); Report (World Rugby)	Try: Richardson 4' m Wilson-Hardy 6' m Scarratt (2) 10' m, 12' c Con: Richardson (1/2); McLean (0/2)

Deodoro Stadium, Rio de Janeiro
Referee: Jess Beard (New Zealand)

Quarter-final

7 August 2016
17:30

Canada	15–5	France
Try: Moleschi 6' m Farella 12' m Landry 14' m Con: Landry (0/2); Russell (0/1)	Report (Rio 2016); Report (World Rugby)	Try: Le Pesq 3' m Con: Le Pesq (0/1)

Deodoro Stadium, Rio de Janeiro
Referee: Amy Perrett (Australia)

Semi-final

8 August 2016
14:30

Australia	17–5	Canada
Try: Cherry (2) 2' c, 7' m Dalton 10' m Con: Dalton (1/3)	Report (Rio 2016); Report (World Rugby)	Try: Williams 13' m Con: Landry (0/1)

Deodoro Stadium, Rio de Janeiro
Referee: Rasta Rasivhenge (South Africa)

Bronze medal game

8 August 2016
18:30

(bronze) Canada	33–10	Great Britain
Try: Paquin 3' c Landry (2) 6' c, 16' c Farella 9' m Russell 10' c Con: Landry (4/5)	Report (Rio 2016); Report (World Rugby)	Try: Waterman 4' m Joyce 13' m Con: McLean (0/1); Richardson (0/1)

Deodoro Stadium, Rio de Janeiro
Referee: Amy Perrett (Australia)

== Sailing ==
Canadian sailors qualified one boat in each of the following classes through the 2014 ISAF Sailing World Championships, the individual fleet Worlds, and North American qualifying regattas.

Olympic veterans Luke Ramsay and Nikola Girke (Nacra 17), as well as the skiff crew Danielle Boyd and Erin Rafuse (49erFX), were the first Canadian sailors to be selected for Rio on March 8, 2016, while the entire nation's Olympic sailing squad will be named by June 2016. Laser Radial sailor Brenda Bowskill was named to the team on May 9, 2016, and was followed by Finn yachtsman Tom Ramshaw a week later and 470 crew brothers Graeme and Jacob Saunders in the first week of June 2016. The team was officially unveiled on July 4, 2016.

Citing the sailors' performances and downward trend throughout the qualifying period, the Canadian Yachting Association decided to reject quota places earned in both windsurfing and 49er classes.

Men

Athlete	Event	Race											Net points	Final rank
Athlete	Event	1	2	3	4	5	6	7	8	9	10	M*	Net points	Final rank
Lee Parkhill	Laser	~~43~~	37	33	9	19	20	14	23	4	13	EL	215	23
Tom Ramshaw	Finn	19	12	~~22~~	13	9	17	22	20	20	19	EL	173	21
Graeme Saunders; Jacob Saunders	470	~~26~~	20	22	19	12	14	17	21	13	21	EL	185	22

Women

Athlete	Event	Race													Net points	Final rank
Athlete	Event	1	2	3	4	5	6	7	8	9	10	11	12	M*	Net points	Final rank
Brenda Bowskill	Laser Radial	9	~~30~~	15	20	10	19	9	20	10	15	—N/a		EL	157	16
Danielle Boyd; Erin Rafuse	49erFX	5	4	11	16	16	16	~~18~~	17	12	18	16	14	EL	163	16

Mixed

Athlete	Event	Race													Net points	Final rank
Athlete	Event	1	2	3	4	5	6	7	8	9	10	11	12	M*	Net points	Final rank
Luke Ramsay; Nikola Girke	Nacra 17	4	15	8	10	16	9	18	~~21~~	15	12	17	9	EL	154	15

M = Medal race; EL = Eliminated – did not advance into the medal race

== Shooting ==
Canadian shooters achieved quota places for the following events with gold medal finishes at the 2015 Pan American Games, as long as they obtained a minimum qualifying score (MQS) by March 31, 2016. Three-time Olympic trap shooter Cynthia Meyer and two-time Pan American Games pistol champion Lynda Kiejko were officially named to the Canadian team on May 5, 2016.

Athlete	Event	Qualification		Semifinal		Final	
Athlete	Event	Points	Rank	Points	Rank	Points	Rank
Lynda Kiejko	Women's 10 m air pistol	374	38	—N/a		did not advance	
Lynda Kiejko	Women's 25 m pistol	552	38	did not advance			
Cynthia Meyer	Women's trap	67	7	did not advance			

Qualification Legend: Q = Qualify for the next round; q = Qualify for the bronze medal (shotgun)

== Swimming ==
A total of 30 swimmers (10 men and 20 women) were selected to the Canadian roster for the Olympics. To secure their nomination to the Olympic team, swimmers needed to have attained a top two finish under the FINA Olympic qualifying A standard in each of the individual pool events at the Canadian Olympic Trials (April 5 to 10) in Toronto. Richard Weinberger qualified for the open water race by finishing in the top 10 at the 2015 World Aquatics Championships in Kazan, Russia. Meanwhile, Stephanie Horner qualified at the 2016 Olympic Marathon Swim Qualifier in Setubal, Portugal.

The six medals won by Canadian swimmers is the most since the 1984 Summer Olympics and the most in a fully contested Olympic swimming competition since the 1976 Summer Olympics.

Key

- Note–Ranks given for swimming events are the round's ranking
- Q = Qualified for the next round
- AM = Americas record
- NR = National record
- OR = Olympic Record
- WJR = World Junior Record
- N/A = Round not applicable for the event

Men

Athlete	Event	Heat		Semifinal		Final	
Athlete	Event	Time	Rank	Time	Rank	Time	Rank
Santo Condorelli	50 m freestyle	21.83	7 Q	21.97	12	did not advance	
Yuri Kisil	50 m freestyle	22.50	35	did not advance			
Santo Condorelli	100 m freestyle	48.22	5 Q	47.93	=3 Q	47.88	4
Yuri Kisil	100 m freestyle	48.49	11 Q	48.28	=10	did not advance	
Ryan Cochrane	400 m freestyle	3:45.83	11	—N/a		did not advance	
Ryan Cochrane	1500 m freestyle	14:53.44	7 Q	—N/a		14:49.61	6
Javier Acevedo	100 m backstroke	54.11	17	did not advance			
Jason Block	100 m breaststroke	1:00.71	24	did not advance			
Ashton Baumann	200 m breaststroke	2:12.61	24	did not advance			
Santo Condorelli	100 m butterfly	51.99	14 Q	51.83 NR	12	did not advance	
Santo Condorelli; Yuri Kisil; Markus Thormeyer; Evan van Moerkerke	4 × 100 m freestyle relay	3:14.06	5 Q	—N/a		3:14.35	7
Javier Acevedo; Jason Block; Mackenzie Darragh; Yuri Kisil	4 × 100 m medley relay	3:36.92	16	—N/a		did not advance	
Richard Weinberger	10 km open water	—N/a				1:53:16.4	17

Women

Athlete	Event	Heat		Semifinal		Final	
Athlete	Event	Time	Rank	Time	Rank	Time	Rank
Chantal Van Landeghem	50 m freestyle	24.57	=8 Q	24.61	10	did not advance	
Michelle Williams	50 m freestyle	24.91	=18	did not advance			
Penny Oleksiak	100 m freestyle	53.53	=5 Q	52.72 WJR, AM	2 Q	52.70 OR, WJR	1st place, gold medalist(s)
Chantal Van Landeghem	100 m freestyle	53.89	9 Q	54.00	10	did not advance	
Brittany MacLean	200 m freestyle	1:57.74	16 Q	1:57.36	10	did not advance	
Katerine Savard	200 m freestyle	1:57.15	13 Q	1:57.80	15	did not advance	
Brittany MacLean	400 m freestyle	4:03.43	5 Q	—N/a		4:04.69	5
Emily Overholt	400 m freestyle	4:16.24	25	—N/a		did not advance	
Brittany MacLean	800 m freestyle	8:26.43	10	—N/a		did not advance	
Dominique Bouchard	100 m backstroke	1:00.18	12 Q	1:00.54	12	did not advance	
Kylie Masse	100 m backstroke	59.07	3 Q	59.06 =NR	5 Q	58.76 NR	3rd place, bronze medalist(s)
Dominique Bouchard	200 m backstroke	2:08.87	7 Q	2:09.07	=9	did not advance	
Hilary Caldwell	200 m backstroke	2:07.40	2 Q	2:07.17	2	2:07.54	3rd place, bronze medalist(s)
Rachel Nicol	100 m breaststroke	1:06.85	11 Q	1:06.73	8 Q	1:06.68	5
Kierra Smith	100 m breaststroke	1:07.41	18	did not advance			
Martha McCabe	200 m breaststroke	2:28.62	23	did not advance			
Kierra Smith	200 m breaststroke	2:23.69	6 Q	2:22.87	8 Q	2:23.19	7
Penny Oleksiak	100 m butterfly	56.73 NR, WJR	3 Q	57.10	5 Q	56.46 NR, WJR	2nd place, silver medalist(s)
Noemie Thomas	100 m butterfly	58.27	17	did not advance			
Audrey Lacroix	200 m butterfly	2:09.21	16 Q	2:09.95	16	did not advance	
Sydney Pickrem	200 m individual medley	2:11.06	8 Q	2:10.57	7	2:11.22	6
Erika Seltenreich-Hodgson	200 m individual medley	2:12.56	14 Q	2:12.53	15	did not advance	
Emily Overholt	400 m individual medley	4:36.54	8 Q	—N/a		4:34.70	5
Sydney Pickrem	400 m individual medley	4:38.06	12	—N/a		did not advance	
Sandrine Mainville; Penny Oleksiak; Chantal Van Landeghem; Taylor Ruck; Michelle Williams^{[a]}	4 × 100 m freestyle relay	3:33.84 NR	3 Q	—N/a		3:32.89 NR	3rd place, bronze medalist(s)
Brittany MacLean; Penny Oleksiak; Katerine Savard; Taylor Ruck; Kennedy Goss^{[a]} Emily Overholt^{[a]}	4 × 200 m freestyle relay	7:51.99	6 Q	—N/a		7:45.39 NR	3rd place, bronze medalist(s)
Kylie Masse; Rachel Nicol; Penny Oleksiak; Taylor Ruck; Noemie Thomas; Chantal van Landeghem	4 × 100 m medley relay	3:56.80 NR	2 Q	—N/a		3:55.49 NR	5
Stephanie Horner	10 km open water	—N/a				1:59:22.1	23

^{a} Swimmers who participated in the heats only and received medals.

== Synchronized swimming ==
Canada fielded a squad of two synchronized swimmers to compete in the women's duet, by claiming the gold medal at the 2015 Pan American Games. The team was officially named on May 18, 2016.

Athlete	Event	Technical routine		Free routine (preliminary)			Free routine (final)		
Athlete	Event	Points	Rank	Points	Total (technical + free)	Rank	Points	Total (technical + free)	Rank
Jacqueline Simoneau; Karine Thomas	Duet	89.2916	7	90.0667	179.3583	7 Q	90.6000	179.8916	7

== Table tennis ==
Canada qualified two table tennis players. Pan American Games silver medallist Eugene Wang and two-time Olympian Zhang Mo secured an Olympic spot in the men's and women's singles, respectively, with a top three finish at the North American Qualification Tournament in Toronto. The team was officially named on June 1, 2016.

Athlete	Event	Preliminary	Round 1	Round 2	Round 3	Round of 16	Quarterfinals	Semifinals	Final / BM	
Athlete	Event	Opposition Result	Opposition Result	Opposition Result	Opposition Result	Opposition Result	Opposition Result	Opposition Result	Opposition Result	Rank
Eugene Wang	Men's singles	Bye	Campos (CUB); W 4–2	Li (TUR); W 4–0	Wong C T (HKG); L 4–0	did not advance				
Zhang Mo	Women's singles	Bye	Matelová (CZE); W 4–3	Pota (HUN); L 4–1	did not advance					

== Taekwondo ==
Canada qualified one taekwondo athlete. 2011 Pan American Games champion Melissa Pagnotta made her Olympic debut in the women's welterweight category (67 kg) with a top two finish at the 2016 Pan American Qualification Tournament in Aguascalientes, Mexico. In May 2016, Pagnotta was officially named to the Olympic team.

Athlete	Event	Round of 16	Quarterfinals	Semifinals	Repechage	Final / BM	
Athlete	Event	Opposition Result	Opposition Result	Opposition Result	Opposition Result	Opposition Result	Rank
Melissa Pagnotta	Women's −67 kg	Oh H-r (KOR); L 3–9	did not advance		Chuang C-c (TPE); L 1–4	Did not advance	7

== Tennis ==
Canada qualified four tennis players. Milos Raonic (world no. 9), Vasek Pospisil (world no. 46), and Eugenie Bouchard (world no. 48) qualified directly among the top 56 eligible players for their respective singles events based on the ATP and WTA World Rankings as of June 6, 2016. Bouchard's doubles partner Gabriela Dabrowski was added to the team on June 30, 2016. On July 15, 2016, Raonic withdrew from the games, citing the Zika virus. Daniel Nestor was chosen to replace him in the men's doubles event.

Athlete	Event	Round of 64	Round of 32	Round of 16	Quarterfinals	Semifinals	Final / BM	
Athlete	Event	Opposition Score	Opposition Score	Opposition Score	Opposition Score	Opposition Score	Opposition Score	Rank
Vasek Pospisil	Men's singles	Monfils (FRA); L 1–6, 3–6	did not advance					
Daniel Nestor; Vasek Pospisil	Men's doubles	—N/a	Daniell / Venus (NZL); W 4–6, 6–3, 7–6^{(8–6)}	Elias / Sousa (POR); W 6–1, 6–4	Fognini / Seppi (ITA); W 6–3, 6–1	López / Nadal (ESP); L 6–7^{(1–7)}, 6–7^{(4–7)}	Johnson / Sock (USA); L 2–6, 4–6	4
Eugenie Bouchard	Women's singles	Stephens (USA); W 6–3, 6–3	Kerber (GER); L 4–6, 2–6	did not advance				
Eugenie Bouchard; Gabriela Dabrowski	Women's doubles	—N/a	Jans-Ignacik / Kania (POL); W 6–4, 5–7, 6–3	Šafářová / Strýcová (CZE); L 7–6^{(7–4)}, 2–6, 4–6	did not advance			

== Triathlon ==
Canada qualified five triathletes (two men and three women). All five quotas were earned through the International Triathlon Union Olympic Qualification List as of May 15, 2016. The team was officially named on June 29, 2016. All five triathletes will be making their Olympic debuts.

Athlete	Event	Swim (1.5 km)	Trans 1	Bike (40 km)	Trans 2	Run (10 km)	Total Time	Rank
Tyler Mislawchuk	Men's	17:31	0:48	56:23	0:35	32:33	1:47:50	15
Andrew Yorke	Men's	18:17	0:48	59:10	0:35	34:36	1:52:46	42
Sarah-Anne Brault	Women's	19:49	0:58	1:03.56	0:43	39:02	2:04:28	42
Amélie Kretz	Women's	19:10	0:55	1:04.39	0:41	37:22	2:02:48	34
Kirsten Sweetland	Women's	19:11	0:58	1:04.34	0:45	38:49	2:04:16	41

== Volleyball ==
=== Beach ===
Canada qualified eight beach volleyball players. Three Canadian beach volleyball teams (one men's pair and two women's pairs) qualified directly for the Olympics with their nation's top 15 placement in the FIVB Olympic Rankings as of June 13, 2016. Meanwhile, another men's pair was added to the Canadian team with the nation's top two finish at the 2016 FIVB Continental Cup in Sochi. The team of Josh Binstock and Sam Schachter won a trial match against another pair on July 16, 2016, in North Bay, Ontario to officially qualify for the games. Canada is one of four countries (along with the host nation Brazil, Netherlands and the United States to qualify two teams in each tournament).

Athlete	Event	Preliminary round	Standing	Round of 16	Quarterfinals	Semifinals	Final / BM	
Athlete	Event	Opposition Score	Standing	Opposition Score	Opposition Score	Opposition Score	Opposition Score	Rank
Ben Saxton; Chaim Schalk	Men's	Pool D Samoilovs – Šmēdiņš (LAT); L 1 – 2 (17–21, 21–18, 13–15); Oliveira – Solberg (BRA); W 2 – 1 (17–21, 21–18, 16–14); Díaz – González (CUB); L 0 – 2 (15–21, 18–21); Lucky Losers; Fijałek – Prudel (POL); W 2 – 0 (21–19, 21–18, 16–14)	3 q	Brouwer – Meeuwsen (NED); L 0 – 2 (12–21, 15–21)	did not advance			
Josh Binstock; Sam Schachter	Men's	Pool A Cerutti – Schmidt (BRA); L 0 – 2 (19–21, 20–22); Carambula – Ranghieri (ITA); L 1 – 2 (18–21, 21–14, 11–15); Doppler – Horst (AUT); L 1 – 2 (19–21, 21–16, 8–15)	4	did not advance				
Heather Bansley; Sarah Pavan	Women's	Pool E van der Vlist – van Gestel (NED); W 2 – 0 (21–15, 21–17); Heidrich – Zumkehr (SUI); W 2 – 0 (21–18, 21–18); Borger – Büthe (GER); W 2 – 0 (21–19, 21–15)	1 Q	Broder – Valjas (CAN); W 2 – 0 (21–16, 21–11)	Ludwig – Walkenhorst (GER); L 0 – 2 (14–21, 14–21)	did not advance		
Jamie Broder; Kristina Valjas	Women's	Pool D Menegatti – Giombini (ITA); W 2 – 1 (15–21, 21–18, 15–9); Ludwig – Walkenhorst (GER); L 0 – 2 (17–21, 11–21); El-Ghobashy – Meawad (EGY); W 2 – 0 (21–12, 21–16)	2 Q	Bansley – Pavan (CAN); L 0 – 2 (16–21, 11–21)	did not advance			

=== Indoor ===
==== Men's tournament ====
Canada men's volleyball team (of 12 athletes) qualified for the Olympics with a top four finish at the first World Olympic Qualifying Tournament in Tokyo, Japan, signifying the team's return to the Olympics for the first time since 1992, and the first, as a nation, since 1996.

Team roster

The following was the Canada roster in the men's volleyball tournament of the 2016 Summer Olympics. The team was announced officially on July 22, 2016.

Head coach: Glenn Hoag

No.	Name	Date of birth	Height	Weight	Spike	Block	2015–16 club
1	TJ Sanders	14 December 1991	1.91 m (6 ft 3 in)	81 kg (179 lb)	326 cm (128 in)	308 cm (121 in)	(Poland) MKS Będzin
2	John Gordon Perrin	17 August 1989	2.01 m (6 ft 7 in)	95 kg (209 lb)	353 cm (139 in)	329 cm (130 in)	(Poland) Asseco Resovia Rzeszów
4	Nicholas Hoag	19 August 1992	2.00 m (6 ft 7 in)	91 kg (201 lb)	342 cm (135 in)	322 cm (127 in)	(France) Paris Volley
5	Rudy Verhoeff	24 June 1989	1.98 m (6 ft 6 in)	88 kg (194 lb)	349 cm (137 in)	317 cm (125 in)	(Germany) Powervolleys Düren
6	Justin Duff	10 May 1988	2.00 m (6 ft 7 in)	102 kg (225 lb)	370 cm (150 in)	335 cm (132 in)	(Portugal) SL Benfica
11	Daniel Jansen Van Doorn	21 March 1990	2.07 m (6 ft 9 in)	98 kg (216 lb)	351 cm (138 in)	328 cm (129 in)	(Greece) Pamvohaikos Vocha
12	Gavin Schmitt	27 January 1986	2.08 m (6 ft 10 in)	106 kg (234 lb)	372 cm (146 in)	340 cm (130 in)	(Brazil) Funvic Taubaté
15	Fred Winters (c)	25 September 1982	1.95 m (6 ft 5 in)	98 kg (216 lb)	359 cm (141 in)	327 cm (129 in)	(Brazil) Sada Cruzeiro
17	Graham Vigrass	17 June 1989	2.05 m (6 ft 9 in)	97 kg (214 lb)	354 cm (139 in)	330 cm (130 in)	(Turkey) Arkas İzmir
19	Blair Cameron Bann (L)	26 February 1988	1.84 m (6 ft 0 in)	84 kg (185 lb)	314 cm (124 in)	295 cm (116 in)	(Germany) Powervolleys Düren
21	Jay Blankenau	27 September 1989	1.94 m (6 ft 4 in)	94 kg (207 lb)	334 cm (131 in)	307 cm (121 in)	(Netherlands) Abiant Lycurgus
22	Steven Marshall	23 November 1989	1.93 m (6 ft 4 in)	87 kg (192 lb)	350 cm (140 in)	322 cm (127 in)	(Germany) SVG Lüneburg

Group A

Pos	Team	Pld	W	L	Pts	SW	SL	SR	SPW	SPL	SPR	Qualification
1	Italy	5	4	1	12	13	5	2.600	432	375	1.152	Quarterfinals
2	Canada	5	3	2	9	10	7	1.429	378	378	1.000	Quarterfinals
3	United States	5	3	2	9	10	8	1.250	419	405	1.035	Quarterfinals
4	Brazil (H)	5	3	2	9	11	9	1.222	467	442	1.057	Quarterfinals
5	France	5	2	3	6	8	9	0.889	386	367	1.052	
6	Mexico	5	0	5	0	1	15	0.067	283	398	0.711	

Source: FIVB
Rules for classification: Tiebreakers
(H) Host

7 August 2016; 17:05	United States	0–3	Canada	Ginásio do Maracanãzinho, Rio de Janeiro; Attendance: 6,875; Referees: Andrey Zenovich (RUS), Mohammad Shahmiri (IRI)
7 August 2016; 17:05	(23–25, 17–25, 23–25); Results Statistics			Ginásio do Maracanãzinho, Rio de Janeiro; Attendance: 6,875; Referees: Andrey Zenovich (RUS), Mohammad Shahmiri (IRI)

9 August 2016; 22:35	Brazil	3–1	Canada	Ginásio do Maracanãzinho, Rio de Janeiro; Attendance: 8,749; Referees: Luis Macias (MEX), Piotr Dudek (POL)
9 August 2016; 22:35	(24–26, 25–18, 25–22, 25–17); Results Statistics			Ginásio do Maracanãzinho, Rio de Janeiro; Attendance: 8,749; Referees: Luis Macias (MEX), Piotr Dudek (POL)

11 August 2016; 17:05	Canada	0–3	France	Ginásio do Maracanãzinho, Rio de Janeiro; Attendance: 6,498; Referees: Andrey Zenovich (RUS), Nasr Shaaban (EGY)
11 August 2016; 17:05	(19–25, 16–25, 19–25); Results Statistics			Ginásio do Maracanãzinho, Rio de Janeiro; Attendance: 6,498; Referees: Andrey Zenovich (RUS), Nasr Shaaban (EGY)

13 August 2016; 20:30	Canada	3–0	Mexico	Ginásio do Maracanãzinho, Rio de Janeiro; Attendance: 5,624; Referees: Hernán Casamiquela (ARG), Taoufik Boudaya (TUN)
13 August 2016; 20:30	(25–20, 25–13, 25–22); Results Statistics			Ginásio do Maracanãzinho, Rio de Janeiro; Attendance: 5,624; Referees: Hernán Casamiquela (ARG), Taoufik Boudaya (TUN)

15 August 2016; 20:30	Italy	1–3	Canada	Ginásio do Maracanãzinho, Rio de Janeiro; Attendance: 7,109; Referees: Andrey Zenovich (RUS), Hernán Casamiquela (ARG)
15 August 2016; 20:30	(23–25, 17–25, 25–16, 21–25); Results Statistics			Ginásio do Maracanãzinho, Rio de Janeiro; Attendance: 7,109; Referees: Andrey Zenovich (RUS), Hernán Casamiquela (ARG)

Quarterfinal

17 August 2016; 10:00	Canada	0–3	Russia	Ginásio do Maracanãzinho, Rio de Janeiro; Attendance: 6,291; Referees: Arturo Di Giacomo (BEL), Mohammad Shahmiri (IRI)
17 August 2016; 10:00	(15–25, 20–25, 18–25); Results Statistics			Ginásio do Maracanãzinho, Rio de Janeiro; Attendance: 6,291; Referees: Arturo Di Giacomo (BEL), Mohammad Shahmiri (IRI)

== Weightlifting ==
Canada qualified one male and one female weightlifter with a top seven national finish (for men) and top four (for women), respectively, at the 2016 Pan American Championships. The team must allocate these places to individual athletes by June 20, 2016. The team was officially announced on July 25, 2016.

Athlete	Event	Snatch		Clean & Jerk		Total	Rank
Athlete	Event	Result	Rank	Result	Rank	Total	Rank
Pascal Plamondon	Men's −85 kg	155	=12	190	=12	345	13
Marie-Ève Beauchemin-Nadeau	Women's −69 kg	98	11	130	8	228	9

== Wrestling ==
Canada qualified a total of eight wrestlers. Two Olympic spots were secured in the women's freestyle (48 & 63 kg) at the 2015 World Championships, while the remainder of the berths were awarded to Canadian wrestlers, who progressed to the top two finals at the 2016 Pan American Qualification Tournament. Haislan Garcia claimed a spot in the men's freestyle 65 kg at the final World Qualification Tournament in Istanbul. The team was officially named on June 23, 2016.

Key:

- VT (ranking points: 5–0 or 0–5) – Victory by fall.
- PP (ranking points: 3–1 or 1–3) – Decision by points – the loser with technical points.
- PO (ranking points: 3–0 or 0–3) – Decision by points – the loser without technical points.
- ST (ranking points: 4–0 or 0–4) – Great superiority – the loser without technical points and a margin of victory of at least 8 (Greco-Roman) or 10 (freestyle) points.
- SP (ranking points: 4–1 or 1–4) – Technical superiority – the loser with technical points and a margin of victory of at least 8 (Greco-Roman) or 10 (freestyle) points.

Men's freestyle

Athlete	Event	Qualification	Round of 16	Quarterfinal	Semifinal	Repechage 1	Repechage 2	Final / BM	
Athlete	Event	Opposition Result	Opposition Result	Opposition Result	Opposition Result	Opposition Result	Opposition Result	Opposition Result	Rank
Haislan Garcia	−65 kg	Ramonov (RUS); L 1–7 ^{PP}	did not advance			Valdés (CUB); W 3^{+}–3 ^{PP}	Mandakhnaran (MGL); L 0–3 ^{PO}	Did not advance	11
Korey Jarvis	−125 kg	Ghasemi (IRI); L 2–5 ^{PP}	did not advance			Kamal (EGY); W 7–0 ^{PO}	Petriashvili (GEO); L 2–9 ^{PP}	Did not advance	8

Women's freestyle

Athlete	Event	Qualification	Round of 16	Quarterfinal	Semifinal	Repechage 1	Repechage 2	Final / BM	
Athlete	Event	Opposition Result	Opposition Result	Opposition Result	Opposition Result	Opposition Result	Opposition Result	Opposition Result	Rank
Jasmine Mian	−48 kg	Bye	Sun Yn (CHN); L 4–14 ^{SP}	did not advance					12
Jillian Gallays	−53 kg	Jong M-s (PRK); L 0–11 ^{ST}	did not advance						19
Michelle Fazzari	−58 kg	Bye	Yeşilırmak (TUR); L 1–3 ^{PP}	did not advance					17
Danielle Lappage	−63 kg	Tkach (UKR); L 0–2^{r} ^{VB}	did not advance						15
Dorothy Yeats	−69 kg	Bye	Rueben (NGR); W 11–1 ^{SP}	Dosho (JPN); L 2–7 ^{PP}	Did not advance	Bye	Tosun (TUR); W 3–2 ^{PP}	Fransson (SWE); L 1–2 ^{PP}	5
Erica Wiebe	−75 kg	Bye	Selmaier (GER); W 5–0 ^{PO}	Zhang Fl (CHN); W 5–2 ^{PP}	Marzaliuk (BLR); W 3–0 ^{PO}	Bye		Manyurova (KAZ); W 6–0 ^{PP}	1st place, gold medalist(s)

== See also ==
- Canada at the 2015 Pan American Games
- Canada at the 2016 Winter Youth Olympics
- Canada at the 2016 Summer Paralympics
