= Kitty King =

British eventing rider

Personal information
- Born: August 10, 1982 (age 43)
Medal record
Equestrian
Representing Great Britain
European Championships
Gold medal – first place	2023 Haras du Pin	Team eventing
Gold medal – first place	2021 Avenches	Team eventing
Silver medal – second place	2023 Haras du Pin	Individual eventing
Silver medal – second place	2015 Blair Castle	Team eventing

Kitty King (born 10 August 1982) is a British Olympic eventing rider. She competed at the 2016 Summer Olympics in Rio de Janeiro where she finished 30th in the individual and 5th in the team competition.

King also participated at three European Eventing Championships (in 2005, 2015 and 2021). Her best results came at the 2015 Europeans held at Blair Castle, when she won a silver medal in the team competition and finished 4th individually. She was the highest placed of the Brits. King is the first British rider to win continental championship medals at all levels: Ponies, Juniors, Young Riders and now Seniors.

== CCI5* Results ==
Results
Event	Kentucky	Badminton	Luhmühlen	Burghley	Pau	Adelaide	Maryland
2006			RET (Five Boys)				
2007	Did not participate						
2008					EL (Boondoggle)		
2009		32nd (Boondoggle)		EL (Boondoggle)			
2010		RET (Boondoggle)					
2011		EL (High Havoc)					
2012-2017	Did not participate						
2018			4th (Ceylor LAN)				
2019		EL (Vendredi Biats)					
2020-2021	Did not participate						
2022		7th (Vendredi Biats)					
EL = Eliminated; RET = Retired; WD = Withdrew
