= Pietro Roman =

Italian equestrian

Personal information
- Born: 20 September 1989 (age 36)

Sport
- Club: G.S. Fiamme Oro
Medal record
Equestrian
Representing Italy
European Championships
Bronze medal – third place	2017 Strzegom	Team eventing

Pietro Roman (born 20 September 1989) is an Italian Olympic eventing rider. He competed at the 2016 Summer Olympics in Rio de Janeiro where he finished 23rd in the individual and 9th in the team competition.

Romam is an athlete of the G.S. Fiamme Oro.

== Biography ==
Roman also participated at the 2015 European Eventing Championships, where he placed 6th with the Italian team in the team event. His brother Luca also participated at the 2016 Olympics. They became the second set of Roman brothers that represented Italy at the Olympics, as their father Federico and their uncle Mauro were part of the Italian eventing squad that took team silver at the 1980 Games in Moscow. Federico also won an individual gold at the Games.
