= Andrey Mitin =

Russian equestrian

Personal information
- Full name: Andrey Valentinovich Mitin
- Born: 5 April 1970 (age 54)

Andrey Valentinovich Mitin (Russian: Андрей Валентинович Митин, born 5 April 1970) is a Russian eventing rider. He competed at the 2016 Summer Olympics in Rio de Janeiro, where he got eliminated in the individual competition and placed 13th in the team competition.

In 2021, Mitin got selected to compete aboard Gurza at the delayed Tokyo 2020 Summer Olympics. He completed the event and placed 38th.
