= Kathryn Robinson (equestrian) =

Canadian equestrian

Personal information
- Discipline: Eventing
- Born: April 8, 1985 (age 41); Canada
Medal record
Equestrian
Representing Canada
Pan American Games
| Bronze medal – third place | 2015 Toronto | Team eventing |

Kathryn Robinson (born April 8, 1985) is a Canadian equestrian who competes in the sport of eventing. Robinson won a bronze medal as part of the Canadian eventing team at the 2015 Pan American Games in Toronto.

In July 2016, she was named to Canada's Olympic team, as a replacement for Selena O'Hanlon. At the Games held in Rio de Janeiro, Brazil, Robinson placed 10th in the team competition and was eliminated from the individual event during the cross-country stage after incurring three refusals.
