= Karim Laghouag =

French equestrian (born 1975)

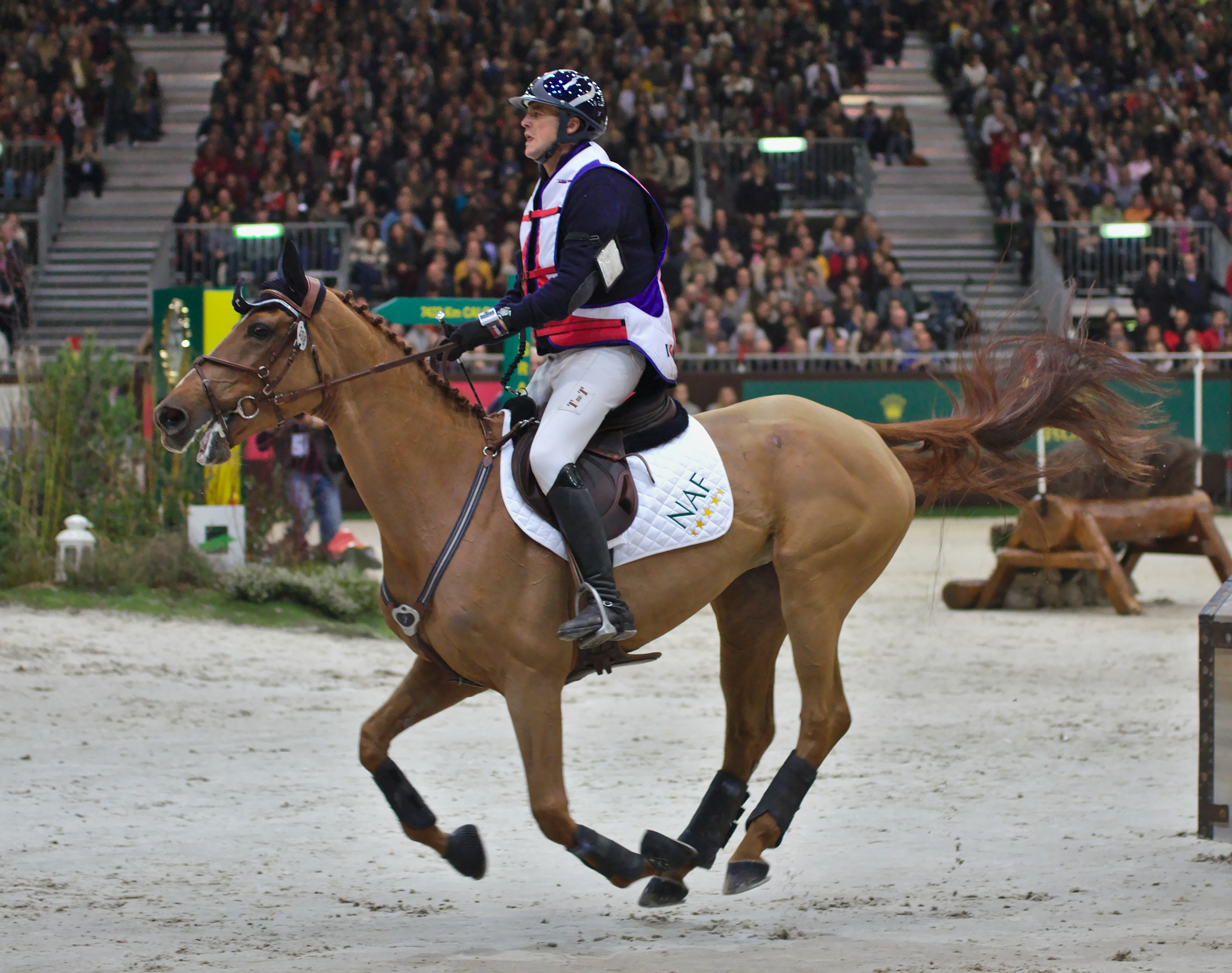
- Laghouag in 2014

Personal information
- Full name: Karim Florent Laghouag
- Born: 4 August 1975 (age 50) Roubaix, France
- Height: 1.77 m (5 ft 10 in)
- Weight: 70 kg (154 lb)

Sport
- Country: France
- Sport: Equestrianism
- Event: Eventing
Medal record
Equestrian
Representing France
Olympic Games
Gold medal – first place	2016 Rio de Janeiro	Team eventing
Silver medal – second place	2024 Paris	Team eventing
Bronze medal – third place	2020 Tokyo	Team eventing
European Championships
Bronze medal – third place	2013 Malmö	Team eventing
Bronze medal – third place	2015 Blair Castle	Team eventing

Karim Florent Laghouag (born 4 August 1975) is a French Olympic equestrian. He represented his country at the 2016 Summer Olympics, where he won the gold medal in the team eventing and finished 28th individually with the horse Entebbe.

Laghouag participated at two World Equestrian Games (in 2006 and 2010) and at three European Eventing Championships (in 2009, 2013 and 2015). He won team bronze medals in 2013 and 2015. Meanwhile, his biggest individual achievement is 10th place from 2006 World Games held in Aachen, Germany

== Personal life ==
Laghouag is of Algerian descent through his father.
