= Arianna Schivo =

Italian equestrian

Personal information
- Born: 16 September 1986 (age 38); Turin
Medal record
Equestrian
Representing Italy
European Championships
Bronze medal – third place	2017 Strzegom	Team eventing

Arianna Schivo (born 16 September 1986) is an Italian Olympic eventing rider. She competed at the 2016 Summer Olympics in Rio de Janeiro where she finished 34th in the individual and 9th in the team competition.

Schivo also participated at the 2015 European Eventing Championships, where she placed 6th with the Italian team in the team event and finished 28th individually.

Her father Gian Marco Schivo was a finalist in the high jump competition at the 1972 Summer Olympics.
