= Mathieu Lemoine =

French equestrian (born 1984)

Personal information
- Nationality: French
- Born: 17 April 1984 (age 42)
- Height: 1.76 m (5 ft 9 in)
- Weight: 70 kg (154 lb)

Sport
- Country: France
- Sport: Equestrianism
Medal record
Equestrian
Representing France
Olympic Games
Gold medal – first place	2016 Rio de Janeiro	Team eventing
European Championships
Bronze medal – third place	2015 Blair Castle	Team eventing

Mathieu Lemoine (born 17 April 1984) is a French Olympic equestrian. He represented his country at the 2016 Summer Olympics, where he won the gold medal in the team eventing and finished 15th individually with the horse Bart.

Lemoine also competed at the 2015 European Eventing Championships held at Blair Castle, where he won a team bronze.
