= Padraig McCarthy =

Irish equestrian

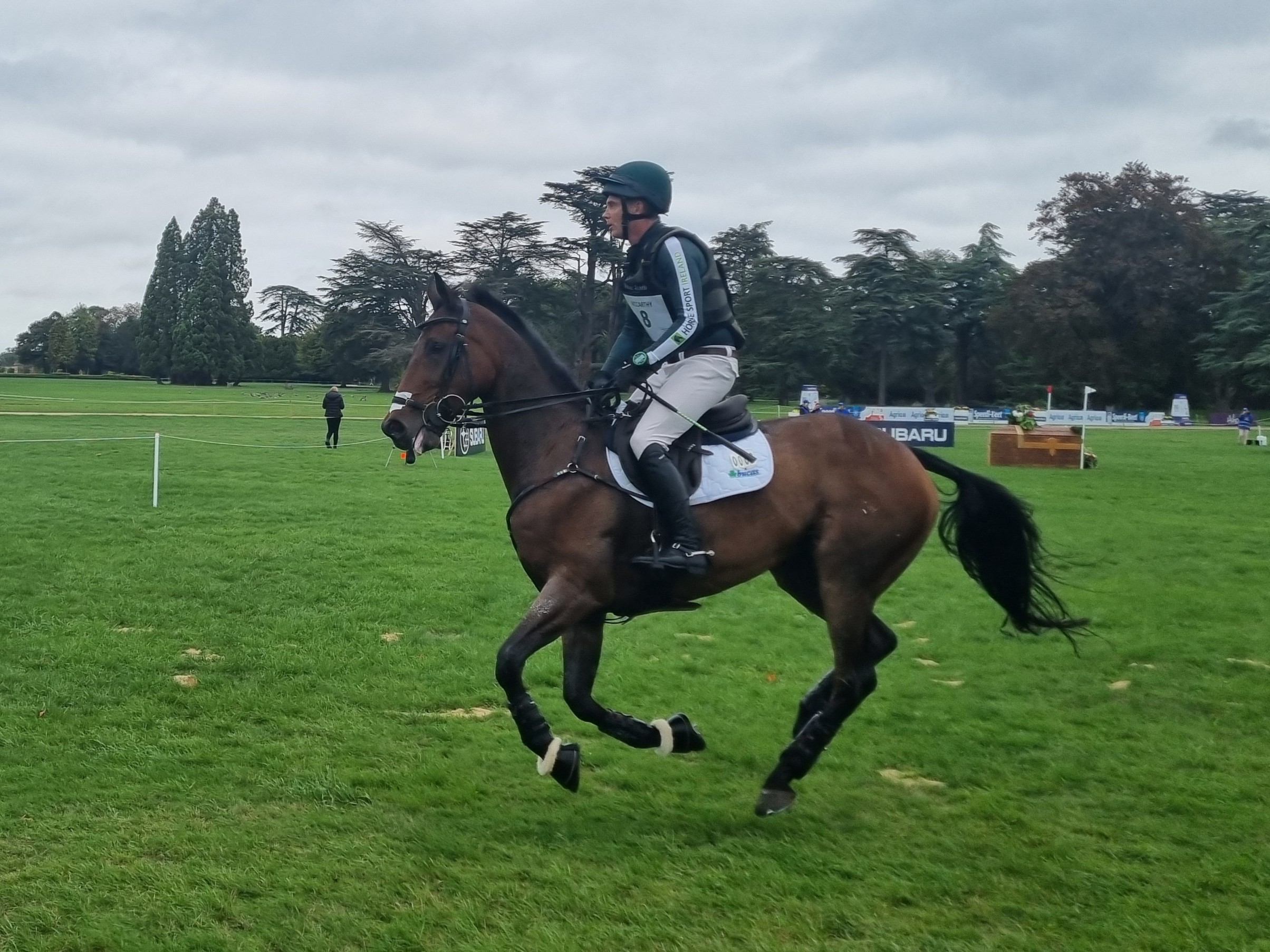
- 2025 European Eventing Championships

Personal information
- Born: 18 July 1977 (age 48)
Medal record
Equestrian
Representing Ireland
World Championships
Silver medal – second place	2018 Tryon	Individual eventing
Silver medal – second place	2018 Tryon	Team eventing
European Championships
Silver medal – second place	2025 Blenheim	Team eventing

Padraig McCarthy (born 18 July 1977) is an Irish Olympic eventing rider.

Representing Ireland, he competed at the 2015 European Eventing Championships at Blair Castle where he placed 9th in team eventing.

McCarthy was selected to compete at the 2016 Summer Olympics in Rio de Janeiro. He did not complete the individual event as he was eliminated after a fall during the cross-country stage. Irish team finished in 9th place in the team competition.

== CCI5* Results ==
Results
Event	Kentucky	Badminton	Luhmühlen	Burghley	Pau	Adelaide	Bicton
2018		8th (Mr Chunky)					
2019		WD (Mr Chunky)					
2021							8th HHS Noble Call
2022		33rd (HHS Noble Call) 41st (Fallulah)					
EL = Eliminated; RET = Retired; WD = Withdrew
