= Equestrian at the 2016 Summer Olympics – Team eventing =

Team eventing at the Games of the XXXI Olympiad
- Venue: National Equestrian Center
- Date: 6–9 August 2016
- Competitors: 51 from 13 nations
- Winning total: 169.00

Medalists
1st place, gold medalist(s)		Karim Laghouag; Thibaut Vallette; Mathieu Lemoine; Astier Nicolas	France
2nd place, silver medalist(s)		Julia Krajewski; Sandra Auffarth; Ingrid Klimke; Michael Jung	Germany
3rd place, bronze medalist(s)		Shane Rose; Stuart Tinney; Sam Griffiths; Chris Burton	Australia

The team eventing in equestrian at the 2016 Summer Olympics in Rio de Janeiro was held at National Equestrian Center from 6 to 9 August.

The French team of Karim Laghouag, Thibaut Vallette, Mathieu Lemoine and Astier Nicolas won the gold medal. Germany won the silver medal and Australia took bronze.

== Competition format ==
The team and individual eventing competitions used the same scores. Eventing consisted of a dressage test, a cross-country test, and a jumping test. The jumping test had two rounds, with only the first used for the team competition. Team eventing final scores were the sum of the three best overall individual scores (adding the three components) from the four-pair teams.

== Schedule ==
Times are Brasília time, BRT (UTC−03:00)

Date	Time	Round
Saturday, 6 August 2016; Sunday, 7 August 2016	10:00	Dressage
Monday, 8 August 2016	10:00	Cross-country
Tuesday, 9 August 2016	10:00	Jumping

== Results ==
=== Standings after dressage ===
Nation	Individual results			Team penalties	Team rank
Nation	Rider	Horse	Penalties	Team penalties	Team rank
Germany	Ingrid Klimke	Hale-Bob Old	39.50	122.00	1
Germany	Sandra Auffarth	Opgun Louvo	41.60	122.00	1
Germany	Michael Jung	Sam FBW	40.90	122.00	1
Germany	Julia Krajewski	Samourai du Thot	44.80	122.00	1
France	Mathieu Lemoine	Bart L	39.20	122.20	2
France	Thibaut Vallette	Qing du Briot	41.00	122.20	2
France	Astier Nicolas	Piaf De B'Neville	42.00	122.20	2
France	Karim Laghouag	Entebbe	43.40	122.20	2
Australia	Chris Burton	Santano II	37.60	126.40	3
Australia	Shane Rose	CP Qualified	42.50	126.40	3
Australia	Sam Griffiths	Paulank Brockagh	46.30	126.40	3
Australia	Stuart Tinney	Pluto Mio	56.80	126.40	3
Great Britain	William Fox-Pitt	Chilli Morning	37.00	127.70	4
Great Britain	Pippa Funnell	Billy the Biz	43.90	127.70	4
Great Britain	Kitty King	Ceylor L A N	46.80	127.70	4
Great Britain	Gemma Tattersall	Quicklook V	47.20	127.70	4
Ireland	Jonty Evans	Cooley Rorke's Drift	41.80	135.60	5
Ireland	Padraig McCarthy	Simon Porloe	46.80	135.60	5
Ireland	Clare Abbott	Euro Prince	47.00	135.60	5
Ireland	Mark Kyle	Jemilla	50.40	135.60	5
New Zealand	Mark Todd	Leonidas II	44.00	137.50	6
New Zealand	Clarke Johnstone	Balmoral Sensation	46.50	137.50	6
New Zealand	Tim Price	Ringwood Sky Boy	47.00	137.50	6
New Zealand	Jonelle Price	Faerie Dianimo	49.50	137.50	6
United States	Phillip Dutton	Mighty Nice	43.60	137.50	6
United States	Clark Montgomery	Loughan Glen	46.60	137.50	6
United States	Lauren Kieffer	Veronica	47.30	137.50	6
United States	Boyd Martin	Blackfoot Mystery	47.70	137.50	6
Italy	Stefano Brecciaroli	Apollo WD Wendi Kurt	41.90	140.90	8
Italy	Pietro Roman	Barraduff	48.20	140.90	8
Italy	Luca Roman	Castlewoods Jake	50.80	140.90	8
Italy	Arianna Schivo	Quefira de l'Ormeau	55.00	140.90	8
Brazil	Ruy Fonseca	Tom Bombadill Too	46.80	144.10	9
Brazil	Carlos Paro	Summon Up the Blood	47.30	144.10	9
Brazil	Márcio Jorge	Lissy Mac Wayer	50.00	144.10	9
Brazil	Márcio Appel	Iberon Jmen	57.20	144.10	9
Sweden	Sara Algotsson Ostholt	Reality 39	45.40	144.20	10
Sweden	Frida Andersen	Herta	47.90	144.20	10
Sweden	Linda Algotsson	Fairnet	50.90	144.20	10
Sweden	Ludvig Svennerstål	Aspe	51.00	144.20	10
Netherlands	Tim Lips	Bayro	46.00	146.60	11
Netherlands	Alice Naber-Lozeman	Peter Parker	46.20	146.60	11
Netherlands	Merel Blom	Rumor Has It	54.40	146.60	11
Netherlands	Theo van de Vendel	Zidane	65.70	146.60	11
Canada	Kathryn Robinson	Let It Bee	49.40	150.80	12
Canada	Rebecca Howard	Riddle Master	49.40	150.80	12
Canada	Jessica Phoenix	A Little Romance	52.00	150.80	12
Canada	Colleen Loach	Qorry Blue D'Argouges	56.50	150.80	12
Russia	Aleksandr Markov	Kurfürstin	48.90	174.80	13
Russia	Andrey Mitin	Gurza	59.90	174.80	13
Russia	Evgeniya Ovchinnikova	Orion	66.00	174.80	13

Note: The team penalties given above are for the top three in each team at this stage and may not tally with the final total scores. The final results are determined by adding the total scores of the top three team members at the end of the competition.

=== Standings after cross-country ===
Nation	Individual results				Total team Penalties	Team rank
Nation	Rider	Horse	Cross Country Penalties	Total Penalties	Total team Penalties	Team rank
Australia	Chris Burton	Santano II	0.00	37.60	150.30	1
Australia	Sam Griffiths	Paulank Brockagh	6.80	53.10	150.30	1
Australia	Stuart Tinney	Pluto Mio	2.80	59.60	150.30	1
Australia	Shane Rose	CP Qualified	Eliminated	1000.00	150.30	1
New Zealand	Mark Todd	Leonidas II	2.00	46.00	154.80	2
New Zealand	Clarke Johnstone	Balmoral Sensation	4.80	51.30	154.80	2
New Zealand	Jonelle Price	Faerie Dianimo	8.00	57.50	154.80	2
New Zealand	Tim Price	Ringwood Sky Boy	Eliminated	1000.00	154.80	2
France	Astier Nicolas	Piaf De B'Neville	0.00	42.00	161.00	3
France	Mathieu Lemoine	Bart L	14.40	53.60	161.00	3
France	Thibaut Vallette	Qing du Briot	24.40	65.40	161.00	3
France	Karim Laghouag	Entebbe	50.40	93.80	161.00	3
Germany	Michael Jung	Sam FBW	0.00	40.90	172.80	4
Germany	Ingrid Klimke	Hale-Bob Old	26.00	65.50	172.80	4
Germany	Sandra Auffarth	Opgun Louvo	24.80	66.40	172.80	4
Germany	Julia Krajewski	Samourai du Thot	Eliminated	1000.00	172.80	4
Netherlands	Merel Blom	Rumor Has It	12.00	66.40	238.60	5
Netherlands	Tim Lips	Bayro	28.00	74.00	238.60	5
Netherlands	Alice Naber-Lozeman	Peter Parker	52.00	98.20	238.60	5
Netherlands	Theo van de Vendel	Zidane	Eliminated	1000.00	238.60	5
Brazil	Carlos Paro	Summon Up the Blood	4.00	51.30	242.90	6
Brazil	Márcio Jorge	Lissy Mac Wayer	20.00	70.00	242.90	6
Brazil	Márcio Appel	Iberon Jmen	64.40	121.60	242.90	6
Brazil	Ruy Fonseca	Tom Bombadill Too	112.00	158.80	242.90	6
Sweden	Frida Andersen	Herta	9.20	57.10	243.10	7
Sweden	Ludvig Svennerstål	Aspe	28.40	79.40	243.10	7
Sweden	Sara Algotsson Ostholt	Reality 39	61.20	106.60	243.10	7
Sweden	Linda Algotsson	Fairnet	109.60	160.50	243.10	7
Great Britain	William Fox-Pitt	Chilli Morning	30.40	67.40	252.10	8
Great Britain	Pippa Funnell	Billy the Biz	40.40	84.30	252.10	8
Great Britain	Kitty King	Ceylor L A N	53.60	100.40	252.10	8
Great Britain	Gemma Tattersall	Quicklook V	89.60	136.80	252.10	8
Ireland	Jonty Evans	Cooley Rorke's Drift	22.80	64.60	278.40	9
Ireland	Mark Kyle	Jemilla	50.80	101.20	278.40	9
Ireland	Clare Abbott	Euro Prince	65.60	112.60	278.40	9
Ireland	Padraig McCarthy	Simon Porloe	Eliminated	1000.00	278.40	9
Italy	Pietro Roman	Barraduff	20.00	68.20	296.00	10
Italy	Arianna Schivo	Quefira de l'Ormeau	50.40	105.40	296.00	10
Italy	Luca Roman	Castlewoods Jake	71.60	122.40	296.00	10
Italy	Stefano Brecciaroli	Apollo WD Wendi Kurt	Eliminated	1000.00	296.00	10
Canada	Rebecca Howard	Riddle Master	12.40	61.80	331.10	11
Canada	Jessica Phoenix	A Little Romance	75.60	127.60	331.10	11
Canada	Colleen Loach	Qorry Blue D'Argouges	85.20	141.70	331.10	11
Canada	Kathryn Robinson	Let It Bee	Eliminated	1000.00	331.10	11
United States	Phillip Dutton	Mighty Nice	3.20	46.80	1097.70	12
United States	Boyd Martin	Blackfoot Mystery	3.20	50.90	1097.70	12
United States	Lauren Kieffer	Veronica	Eliminated	1000.00	1097.70	12
United States	Clark Montgomery	Loughan Glen	Retired	1000.00	1097.70	12
Russia	Aleksandr Markov	Kurfürstin	Eliminated	1000.00	3000.00	13
Russia	Andrey Mitin	Gurza	Eliminated	1000.00	3000.00	13
Russia	Evgeniya Ovchinnikova	Orion	Withdrew	1000.00	3000.00	13

Note: The team penalties given above are for the top three in each team at this stage and may not tally with the final total scores. The final results are determined by adding the total scores of the top three team members at the end of the competition.

=== Standings after jumping (Final Standings) ===
Final results below, determined by combining the three best overall scores for each team.

Nation	Individual results				Total team Penalties	Team rank
Nation	Rider	Horse	Jumping Penalties	Total Penalties	Total team Penalties	Team rank
France	Astier Nicolas	Piaf De B'Neville	0.00	42.00	169.00	1st place, gold medalist(s)
France	Mathieu Lemoine	Bart L	8.00	61.60	169.00	1st place, gold medalist(s)
France	Thibaut Vallette	Qing du Briot	0.00	65.40	169.00	1st place, gold medalist(s)
France	Karim Laghouag	Entebbe	1.00	94.80	169.00	1st place, gold medalist(s)
Germany	Michael Jung	Sam FBW	0.00	40.90	172.80	2nd place, silver medalist(s)
Germany	Ingrid Klimke	Hale-Bob Old	0.00	65.50	172.80	2nd place, silver medalist(s)
Germany	Sandra Auffarth	Opgun Louvo	0.00	66.40	172.80	2nd place, silver medalist(s)
Germany	Julia Krajewski	Samourai du Thot	Eliminated	1000.00	172.80	2nd place, silver medalist(s)
Australia	Chris Burton	Santano II	8.00	45.60	175.30	3rd place, bronze medalist(s)
Australia	Sam Griffiths	Paulank Brockagh	0.00	53.10	175.30	3rd place, bronze medalist(s)
Australia	Stuart Tinney	Pluto Mio	17.00	76.60	175.30	3rd place, bronze medalist(s)
Australia	Shane Rose	CP Qualified	Eliminated	1000.00	175.30	3rd place, bronze medalist(s)
New Zealand	Clarke Johnstone	Balmoral Sensation	0.00	51.30	178.80	4
New Zealand	Mark Todd	Leonidas II	16.00	62.00	178.80	4
New Zealand	Jonelle Price	Faerie Dianimo	8.00	65.50	178.80	4
New Zealand	Tim Price	Ringwood Sky Boy	Eliminated	1000.00	178.80	4
Great Britain	William Fox-Pitt	Chilli Morning	0.00	67.40	252.10	5
Great Britain	Pippa Funnell	Billy the Biz	0.00	84.30	252.10	5
Great Britain	Kitty King	Ceylor L A N	0.00	100.40	252.10	5
Great Britain	Gemma Tattersall	Quicklook V	4.00	140.80	252.10	5
Netherlands	Merel Blom	Rumor Has It	2.00	68.40	252.60	6
Netherlands	Tim Lips	Bayro	8.00	82.00	252.60	6
Netherlands	Alice Naber-Lozeman	Peter Parker	4.00	102.20	252.60	6
Netherlands	Theo van de Vendel	Zidane	Eliminated	1000.00	252.60	6
Brazil	Carlos Paro	Summon Up the Blood	12.00	63.30	280.90	7
Brazil	Márcio Jorge	Lissy Mac Wayer	10.00	80.00	280.90	7
Brazil	Márcio Appel	Iberon Jmen	16.00	137.60	280.90	7
Brazil	Ruy Fonseca	Tom Bombadill Too	Eliminated	1000.00	280.90	7
Ireland	Jonty Evans	Cooley Rorke's Drift	0.00	64.60	286.40	8
Ireland	Mark Kyle	Jemilla	8.00	109.20	286.40	8
Ireland	Clare Abbott	Euro Prince	0.00	112.60	286.40	8
Ireland	Padraig McCarthy	Simon Porloe	Eliminated	1000.00	286.40	8
Italy	Pietro Roman	Barraduff	14.00	82.20	330.00	9
Italy	Arianna Schivo	Quefira de l'Ormeau	4.00	109.40	330.00	9
Italy	Luca Roman	Castlewoods Jake	16.00	138.40	330.00	9
Italy	Stefano Brecciaroli	Apollo van de Wendi Kurt Hoeve	Eliminated	1000.00	330.00	9
Canada	Rebecca Howard	Riddle Master	0.00	61.80	339.10	10
Canada	Jessica Phoenix	A Little Romance	4.00	131.60	339.10	10
Canada	Colleen Loach	Qorry Blue D'Argouges	4.00	145.70	339.10	10
Canada	Kathryn Robinson	Let It Bee	Eliminated	1000.00	339.10	10
Sweden	Ludvig Svennerstål	Aspe	8.00	87.40	364.50	11
Sweden	Sara Algotsson Ostholt	Reality 39	6.00	112.60	364.50	11
Sweden	Linda Algotsson	Fairnet	4.00	164.50	364.50	11
Sweden	Frida Andersen	Herta	Withdrew	1000.00	364.50	11
United States	Phillip Dutton	Mighty Nice	1.00	47.80	1106.70	12
United States	Boyd Martin	Blackfoot Mystery	8.00	58.90	1106.70	12
United States	Lauren Kieffer	Veronica	Eliminated	1000.00	1106.70	12
United States	Clark Montgomery	Loughan Glen	Retired	1000.00	1106.70	12
Russia	Aleksandr Markov	Kurfürstin	Eliminated	1000.00	3000.00	13
Russia	Andrey Mitin	Gurza	Eliminated	1000.00	3000.00	13
Russia	Evgeniya Ovchinnikova	Orion	Withdrew	1000.00	3000.00	13
