= Evgeniya Ovchinnikova =

Russian equestrian

Personal information
- Born: April 7, 1985 (age 41)

Evgeniya Alexandrovna Ovchinnikova (Russian: Евгения Александровна Овчинникова, born 7 April 1985) is a Russian Olympic eventing rider. She competed at the 2016 Summer Olympics in Rio de Janeiro, where she withdrew during the individual competition and placed 13th in the team competition.
