= Luca Roman =

Italian equestrian

Personal information
- Born: 10 December 1985 (age 40)

Luca Roman (born 10 December 1985) is an Italian Olympic eventing rider. He competed at the 2016 Summer Olympics in Rio de Janeiro where he finished 40th in the individual and 9th in the team competition.

Roman also participated at the 2015 European Eventing Championships, where he placed 6th with the Italian team in the team event and finished 15th individually.

His brother Pietro also participated at the 2016 Olympics. They became the second set of Roman brothers that represented Italy at the Olympics, as their father Federico and their uncle Mauro were part of the Italian eventing squad that took team silver at the 1980 Games in Moscow. Federico also won an individual gold at the Games.
