= Thibaut Vallette =

French equestrian (born 1974)

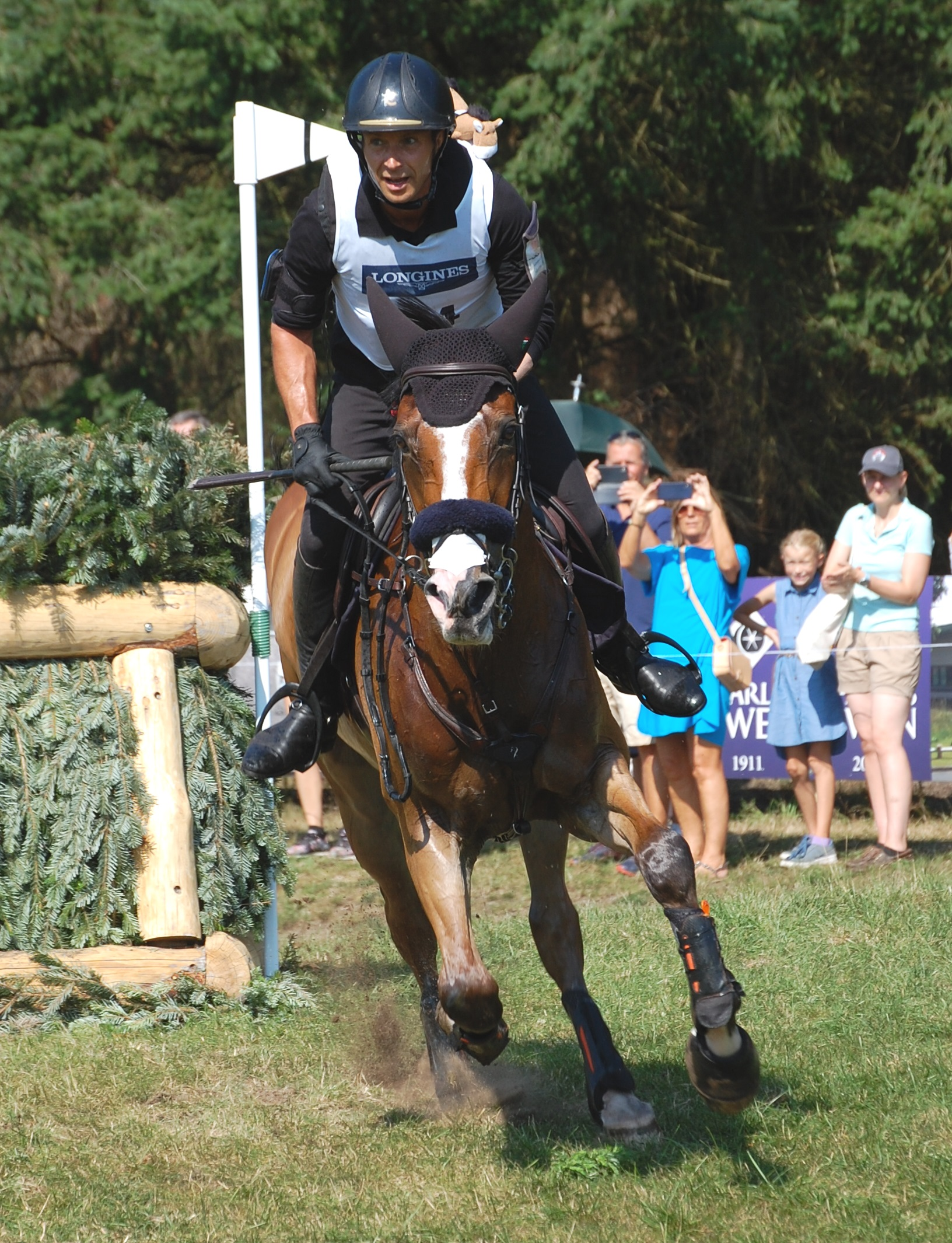
- Vallette astride Qing du Briot at the 2019 European Eventing Championship

Personal information
- Nationality: French
- Born: 18 January 1974 (age 52)
- Height: 1.71 m (5 ft 7 in)
- Weight: 60 kg (132 lb)

Sport
- Country: France
- Sport: Equestrianism
Medal record
Equestrian
Representing France
Olympic Games
Gold medal – first place	2016 Rio de Janeiro	Team eventing
World Championships
Bronze medal – third place	2018 Tryon	Team eventing
European Championships
Bronze medal – third place	2015 Blair Castle	Individual eventing
Bronze medal – third place	2015 Blair Castle	Team eventing

Lieutenant Colonel Thibaut Vallette (born 18 January 1974) is a French equestrian. He represented his country at the 2016 Summer Olympics, where he won the gold medal in the team eventing. He was a career officer in the Alpine Troops (Chasseurs Alpins) before being seconded to the Cadre Noir at Saumur.

Vallette also participated at the 2015 European Eventing Championships held at Blair Castle, where he won bronze medals in both team and individual eventing.

== CCI 5* Results ==
Results
Event	Kentucky	Badminton	Luhmühlen	Burghley	Pau	Adelaide
2017		27th (Qing du Briot Ene HN)				
2018	Did not participate					
EL = Eliminated; RET = Retired; WD = Withdrew

== International Championship Results ==
Results
Year	Event	Horse	Placing	Notes
2008	World Young Horse Championships	Nuit Etoilee D'illon	18th	CCI**
2015	European Championships	Qing du Briot Ene HN	3rd place, bronze medalist(s)	Team
2015	European Championships	Qing du Briot Ene HN	3rd place, bronze medalist(s)	Individual
2016	Olympic Games	Qing du Briot Ene HN	1st place, gold medalist(s)	Team
2016	Olympic Games	Qing du Briot Ene HN	13th	Individual
2017	European Championships	Qing du Briot Ene HN	11th	Team
2017	European Championships	Qing du Briot Ene HN	10th	Individual
2018	World Equestrian Games	Qing du Briot Ene HN	3rd place, bronze medalist(s)	Team
2018	World Equestrian Games	Qing du Briot Ene HN	6th	Individual
EL = Eliminated; RET = Retired; WD = Withdrew
