= Merel Blom =

Dutch Olympic eventing rider

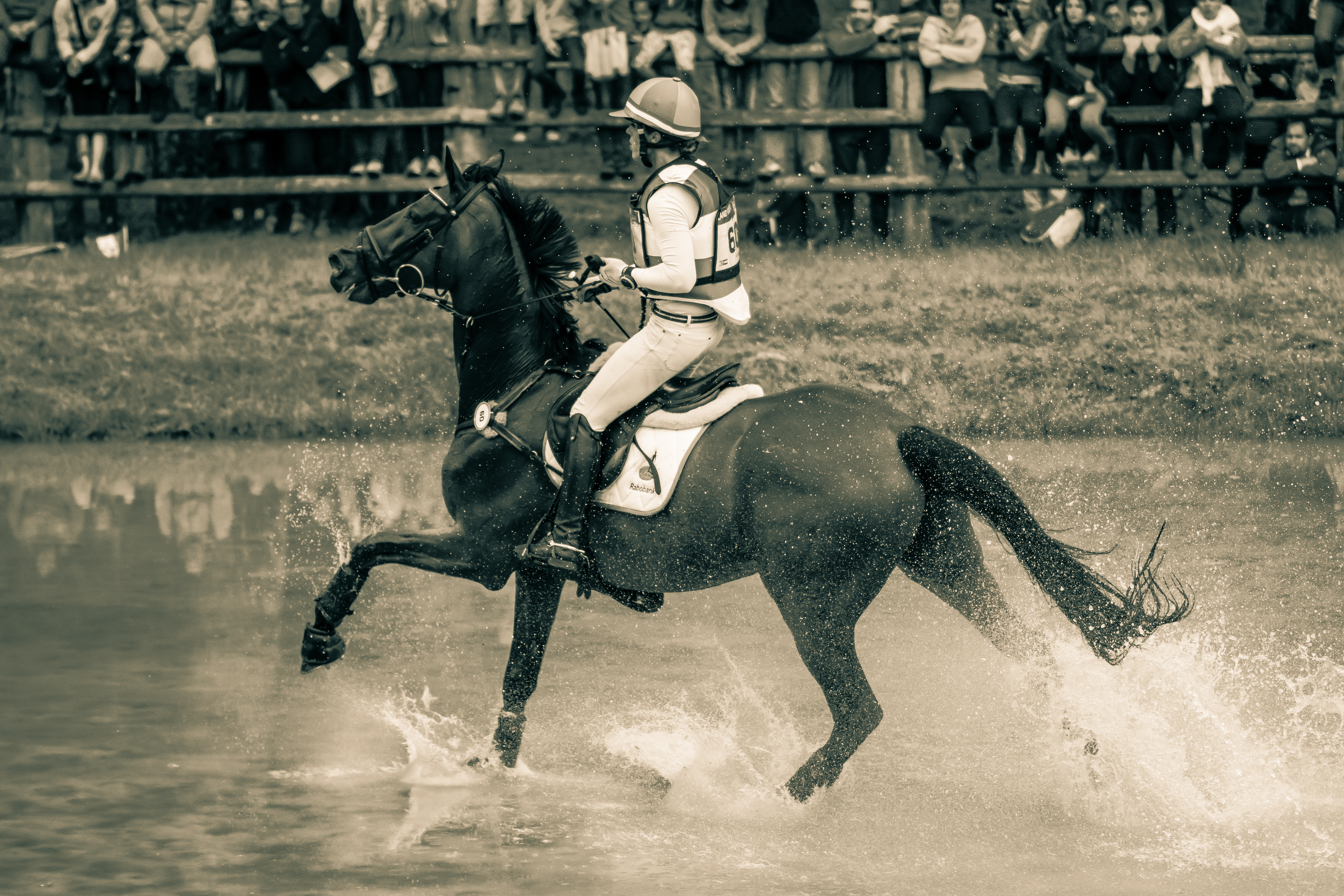
- Merel Blom riding Rumour Has It at the 2014 World Equestrian Games

Personal information
- Full name: Merel Blom-Hulsman
- Born: 19 August 1986 (age 39); Texel, Noord-Holland
- Height: 171 cm (5 ft 7 in)
- Weight: 60 kg (132 lb)
Medal record
Equestrian
Representing the Netherlands
World Equestrian Games
Bronze medal – third place	2014 Normandy	Team eventing

Merel Blom-Hulsman (born 19 August 1986) is a Dutch Olympic eventing rider. She competed at the 2016 Summer Olympics in Rio de Janeiro where she finished 19th in the individual and 6th in the team competition.

Blom also participated in the 2014 World Equestrian Games and at two European Eventing Championships (in 2011 and 2015). She won a team bronze at the 2014 World Games in Normandy, France.
