= Clark Montgomery =

American equestrian

Personal information
- Born: May 20, 1981 (age 45)

Clark Montgomery (born May 20, 1981) is an American Olympic eventing rider. He competed at the 2016 Summer Olympics in Rio de Janeiro, but did not finish the individual competition as he retired during the cross-country stage.
