= Theo van de Vendel =

Dutch Olympic eventing rider

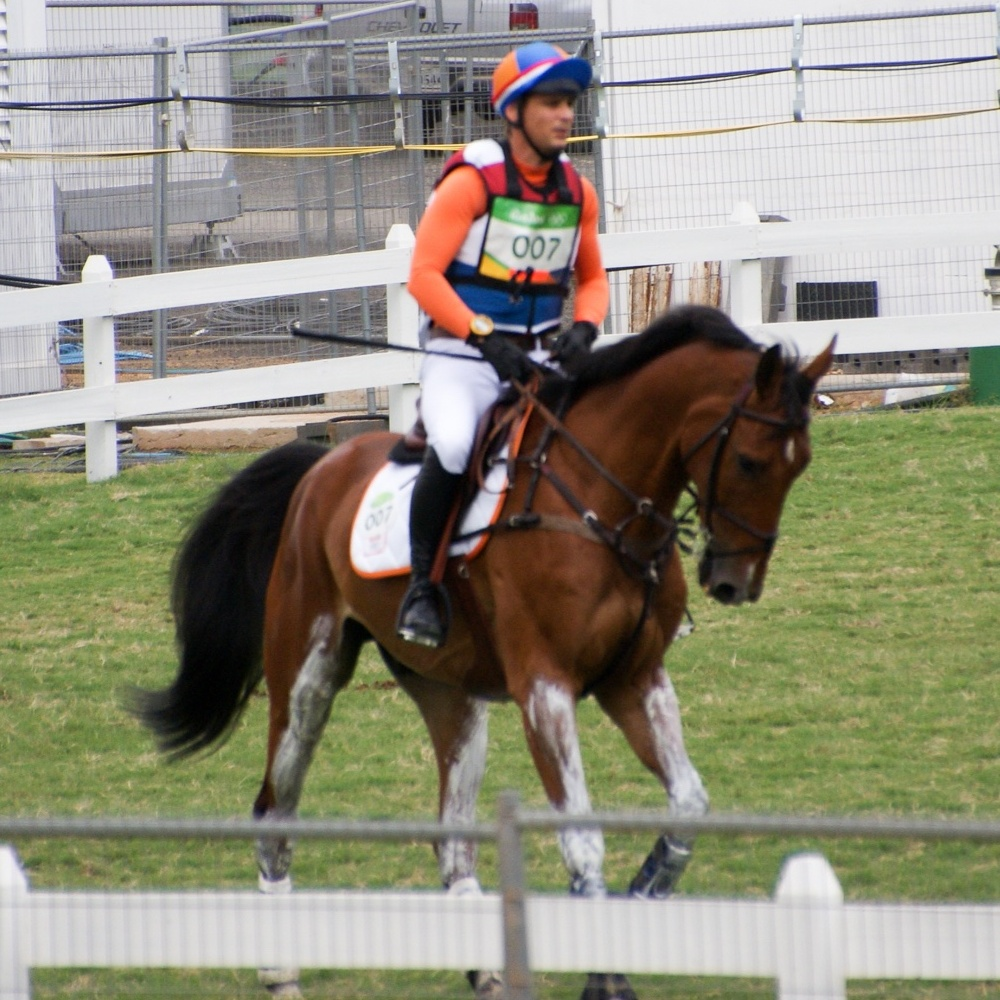
- 2016

Personal information
- Born: 24 October 1980 (age 44); Ederveen, Gelderland
- Height: 176 cm (5 ft 9 in)
- Weight: 73 kg (161 lb)

Theo van de Vendel (born 24 October 1980) is a Dutch Olympic eventing rider. He competed at the 2016 Summer Olympics in Rio de Janeiro where he was eliminated in the individual and finished 6th in the team competition.

Van de Vendel also participated at the 2015 European Eventing Championships, where he finished 4th in the team event.
