= Aleksandr Markov (equestrian) =

Russian equestrian

Personal information
- Full name: Aleksandr Ivanovich Markov
- Nationality: (Russia) Russian
- Born: May 26, 1985 (age 39); Ryazan, RSFSR, USSR (now Russia)

Aleksandr Ivanovich Markov (born 26 May 1985) is a Russian eventing rider. He competed at the 2016 Summer Olympics in Rio de Janeiro, where he got eliminated in the individual and placed 13th in the team competition.

Markov contested two European Eventing Championships (in 2009 and 2017). His career-best result was achieved at the 2017 Europeans in Strzegom, where he placed 19th individually aboard Kurfurstin.

In 2021, Aleksandr Markov and his horse Leader got selected to compete at the delayed Tokyo 2020 Summer Olympics.
