= Ireland at the 2016 Summer Olympics =

- IOC code: IRL
- NOC: Olympic Federation of Ireland
- Website: olympics.ie

in Rio de Janeiro
- Competitors: 77 in 14 sports
- Flag bearers: Paddy Barnes (opening); Gary O'Donovan (closing)
- Medals Ranked 63rd: Gold 0 Silver 2 Bronze 0 Total 2

Summer Olympics appearances (overview)
- 1924; 1928; 1932; 1936; 1948; 1952; 1956; 1960; 1964; 1968; 1972; 1976; 1980; 1984; 1988; 1992; 1996; 2000; 2004; 2008; 2012; 2016; 2020; 2024; 2028

Other related appearances
- Great Britain (1896–1920)

Ireland competed at the 2016 Summer Olympics in Rio de Janeiro, Brazil, from 5 to 21 August 2016. This was the nation's twenty-first appearance at the Summer Olympics, having attended every edition, either in its own right or as part of a Great Britain and Ireland team before 1924, with the exception of the 1936 Summer Olympics in Germany.

The Olympic Council of Ireland fielded a team of 77 athletes, 51 men and 26 women, across 14 sports at the Games. It was the nation's largest delegation sent to the Olympics since 1996, due to the historic comeback of the men's field hockey squad after a century-long absence. Apart from field hockey, Ireland also made its Olympic return to diving after nearly seven decades, as well as its debut in golf (new to the 2016 Games) and women's track cycling.

The Irish roster featured four Olympic medalists from London 2012, namely defending boxing champion Katie Taylor in the women's flyweight division, boxers Michael Conlan and Paddy Barnes (bronze in 2008 and 2012), who was selected as the nation's flag bearer in the opening ceremony, and race walking veteran Robert Heffernan, who became the first Irishman in history to participate in five Olympics. Kevin Kilty was named as Team Ireland Chef de Mission for the Games.

Ireland returned home from Rio de Janeiro with two silver medals. Brothers Gary and Paul O'Donovan etched their names on Irish sporting history by winning the country's first ever medal in rowing, and instantly became internet sensations after several videos of them being interviewed went viral. Meanwhile, Laser Radial sailor Annalise Murphy banished her pain of missing out the podium at London 2012 with a silver-medal effort in the Laser Radial class, ending Ireland's 36-year-old drought on the sport. For the first time in 12 years, Ireland failed to collect a single medal in boxing, as none of its boxers progressed beyond the quarterfinal round.

== Ticket scandal ==
On 5 August police in Rio arrested two people for attempted illegal resale of hundreds of tickets allocated to the Olympic Council of Ireland (OCI). One of the two was employed by THG Sports, which was the OCI's authorised ticket reseller (ATR) in 2012 but not 2016; the OCI denied any involvement. Shane Ross, the Minister of State at the, promised a "robust inquiry". Pro 10 Sports Management, the OCI's 2016 ATR, said the man arrested was working as their agent to distribute tickets which had been paid for legitimately. On 17 August, Pat Hickey, the OCI president, was arrested in Rio in connection with the investigation.

== Medallists ==
Medal	Name	Sport	Event	Date
Silver	Gary O'Donovan; Paul O'Donovan	Rowing	Men's lightweight double sculls	12 August
Silver	Annalise Murphy	Sailing	Women's Laser Radial	16 August

Medals by sport
Sport	1st place, gold medalist(s)	2nd place, silver medalist(s)	3rd place, bronze medalist(s)	Total
Rowing	0	1	0	1
Sailing	0	1	0	1
Total	0	2	0	2

Medals by date
Date	1st place, gold medalist(s)	2nd place, silver medalist(s)	3rd place, bronze medalist(s)	Total
12 Aug	0	1	0	1
16 Aug	0	1	0	1
Total	0	2	0	2

Medals by gender
Gender	1st place, gold medalist(s)	2nd place, silver medalist(s)	3rd place, bronze medalist(s)	Total
Male	0	1	0	1
Female	0	1	0	1
Total	0	2	0	2

== Athletics ==
Irish athletes achieved qualifying standards in the following athletics events (up to a maximum of 3 athletes in each event):

Following the end of the qualifying period on July 11, 2016, a total of 17 athletes (8 men and 9 women) were officially named to the Irish track and field roster, with race walker and London 2012 bronze medalist Robert Heffernan becoming the first Irishman in history to be selected for five consecutive Olympics.

Key

- Note–Ranks given for track events are within the athlete's heat only
- Q = Qualified for the next round
- q = Qualified for the next round as a fastest loser or, in field events, by position without achieving the qualifying target
- NR = National record
- N/A = Round not applicable for the event
- Bye = Athlete not required to compete in round
- NM = No mark

Track & road events
Men

Athlete	Event	Heat		Semifinal		Final	
Athlete	Event	Result	Rank	Result	Rank	Result	Rank
Mark English	800 m	1:46.40	3 Q	1:45.93	5	Did not advance	
Thomas Barr	400 m hurdles	48.93	2 Q	48.39	1 Q	47.97	4
Mick Clohisey	Marathon	—N/a				2:26:34	103
Paul Pollock	Marathon	—N/a				2:16:24	32
Kevin Seaward	Marathon	—N/a				2:20:06	64
Alex Wright	20 km walk	—N/a				1:25:25	46
Brendan Boyce	50 km walk	—N/a				3:53:59	19
Robert Heffernan	50 km walk	—N/a				3:43:55	6
Alex Wright	50 km walk	—N/a				DNF	

Women

Athlete	Event	Heat		Semifinal		Final	
Athlete	Event	Result	Rank	Result	Rank	Result	Rank
Ciara Everard	800 m	2:07.91	8	Did not advance			
Ciara Mageean	1500 m	4:11.51	2 Q	4:08.07	11	Did not advance	
Fionnuala McCormack	10000 m	—N/a				Withdrew before race	
Michelle Finn	3000 m steeplechase	9:49.45	11	—N/a		Did not advance	
Kerry O'Flaherty	3000 m steeplechase	9:45.53	14	—N/a		Did not advance	
Sara Louise Treacy	3000 m steeplechase	9:46.24	12 q	—N/a		9:52.70	17
Breege Connelly	Marathon	—N/a				2:44:41	76
Lizzie Lee	Marathon	—N/a				2:39:57	57
Fionnuala McCormack	Marathon	—N/a				2:31:22	20

Field events

Athlete	Event	Qualification		Final	
Athlete	Event	Distance	Position	Distance	Position
Tori Pena	Women's pole vault	4.30	27	Did not advance	

== Badminton ==
Ireland qualified two badminton players for each of the following events into the Olympic tournament. Two-time Olympian Scott Evans was selected among the top 34 individual shuttlers in the men's singles based on the BWF World Rankings as of 5 May 2016, while Chloe Magee picked up one of the spare athlete berths from the doubles as the next highest-ranked eligible player in the women's singles.

Athlete	Event	Group stage			Elimination	Quarterfinal	Semifinal	Final / BM	
Athlete	Event	Opposition Score	Opposition Score	Rank	Opposition Score	Opposition Score	Opposition Score	Opposition Score	Rank
Scott Evans	Men's singles	Zwiebler (GER); W (9–21, 21–17, 21–7)	de Oliveira (BRA); W (21–8, 19–21, 21–8)	1	Axelsen (DEN); L (16–21, 12–21)	Did not advance			
Chloe Magee	Women's singles	Wang Yh (CHN); L (7–21, 12–21)	Schnaase (GER); L (14–21, 19–21)	3	Did not advance				

== Boxing ==
Ireland entered eight boxers to compete in the following weight classes into the Olympic boxing tournament. 2012 Olympic bronze medalist Paddy Barnes and Michael Conlan were the only Irishmen finishing among the top two of their respective division in the World Series of Boxing, and qualified from that method. Conlan and Joe Ward earned spots at the 2015 World Championships. Conlan's results in the World Championships took preference, allowing others to qualify through the WSB. Steven Donnelly had initially finished outside the qualifying places in the WSB, but eventually received the unused spot, following a box-off between both Russian qualifiers (through WSB and World Championships).

Brendan Irvine and David Joyce booked Olympic spots with box-off victories at the 2016 European Qualification Tournament in Samsun, Turkey. Meanwhile, London 2012 lightweight champion Katie Taylor had her sights set to her Olympic title defense in Rio with a quarterfinal victory at the World Championships in Astana, Kazakhstan. Michael O'Reilly secured an additional Olympic place on the Irish roster at the 2016 AIBA World Qualifying Tournament in Baku, Azerbaijan.

Longtime head coach Billy Walsh left the Irish Amateur Boxing Association for USA Boxing in October 2015 after a contract dispute; this was mooted as a factor in the team's disappointing results.

Men

Athlete	Event	Round of 32	Round of 16	Quarterfinals	Semifinals	Final	
Athlete	Event	Opposition Result	Opposition Result	Opposition Result	Opposition Result	Opposition Result	Rank
Paddy Barnes	Light flyweight	Bye	Carmona (ESP); L 1–2	Did not advance			
Brendan Irvine	Flyweight	Zoirov (UZB); L 0–3	Did not advance				
Michael Conlan	Bantamweight	Bye	Avagyan (ARM); W 3–0	Nikitin (RUS); L 0–3	Did not advance		
David Joyce	Lightweight	Allisop (SEY); W 3–0	Selimov (AZE); L 0–3	Did not advance			
Steven Donnelly	Welterweight	Kedache (ALG); W 3–0	Tüvshinbat (MGL); W 2–1	Rabii (MAR); L 1–2	Did not advance		
Michael O'Reilly	Middleweight	Bye	Rodríguez (MEX); L WO	Disqualified for failing a drugs test			
Joe Ward	Light heavyweight	Bye	Mina (ECU); L 1–2	Did not advance			

Women

Athlete	Event	Round of 16	Quarterfinals	Semifinals	Final	
Athlete	Event	Opposition Result	Opposition Result	Opposition Result	Opposition Result	Rank
Katie Taylor	Lightweight	Bye	Potkonen (FIN); L 1–2	Did not advance		

== Cycling ==
=== Road ===
Irish riders qualified for a maximum of two quota places in the men's Olympic road race by virtue of their top 15 final national ranking in the 2015 UCI Europe Tour.

Athlete	Event	Time	Rank
Dan Martin	Men's road race	6:13:03	13
Nicolas Roche	Men's road race	6:19:43	29

=== Track ===
Following the completion of the 2016 UCI Track Cycling World Championships, Ireland entered one rider to compete only in women's keirin at the Olympics, by virtue of her final individual UCI Olympic ranking in that event.

Keirin

Athlete	Event	1st Round	Repechage	2nd Round	Final
Athlete	Event	Rank	Rank	Rank	Rank
Shannon McCurley	Women's keirin	5 R	4	Did not advance	

== Diving ==
For the first time since the 1948 Summer Olympics, Ireland entered one diver into the Olympic competition by virtue of a top 18 finish at the 2016 FINA World Cup.

Athlete	Event	Preliminaries		Semifinals		Final	
Athlete	Event	Points	Rank	Points	Rank	Points	Rank
Oliver Dingley	Men's 3 m springboard	399.80	13 Q	414.25	9 Q	442.90	8

== Equestrian ==
Ireland fielded a full squad of riders in the eventing competition by finishing sixth in the team event at the 2014 FEI World Equestrian Games. One dressage and jumping rider were each added to the squad by virtue of the following results in the individual FEI Olympic rankings: a top six placement outside the continental selection in dressage, and a top finish from North Western Europe in jumping.

=== Dressage ===
Judy Reynolds and Vancouver K were named to the Irish roster on June 10, 2016.

Athlete	Horse	Event	Grand Prix		Grand Prix Special		Grand Prix Freestyle		Overall	
Athlete	Horse	Event	Score	Rank	Score	Rank	Technical	Artistic	Score	Rank
Judy Reynolds	Vancouver K	Individual	74.700	21 Q	74.090	17 Q	72.250	79.143	75.696	18

=== Eventing ===
The Irish eventing team was named to the Olympic equestrian roster on June 9, 2016.

Athlete	Horse	Event	Dressage		Cross-country			Jumping						Total	
Athlete	Horse	Event	Dressage		Cross-country			Qualifier			Final			Total	
Athlete	Horse	Event	Penalties	Rank	Penalties	Total	Rank	Penalties	Total	Rank	Penalties	Total	Rank	Penalties	Rank
Clare Abbott	Euro Prince	Individual	47.00	29	107.90	112.60	38	0.00	112.60	36	Did not advance			112.60	36
Jonty Evans	Cooley Rorke's Drift	Individual	41.80	9	22.80	64.60	16	0.00	64.60	13 Q	0.00	64.60	9	64.60	9
Mark Kyle	Jemilla	Individual	50.40	45	50.80	101.20	35	8.00	109.20	33	Did not advance			109.20	33
Padraig McCarthy	Simon Porloe	Individual	46.80 #	26	Eliminated			Did not advance							
Clare Abbott; Jonty Evans; Mark Kyle	See above	Team	135.60	5	123.80	278.40	9	8.00	286.40	8	—N/a			286.40	8

"#" indicates that the score of this rider does not count in the team competition, since only the best three results of a team are counted.

=== Jumping ===
Greg Broderick and Going Global were named to the Irish roster on June 8, 2016.

Athlete	Horse	Event	Qualification								Final					Total	
Athlete	Horse	Event	Round 1		Round 2			Round 3			Round A		Round B			Total	
Athlete	Horse	Event	Penalties	Rank	Penalties	Total	Rank	Penalties	Total	Rank	Penalties	Rank	Penalties	Total	Rank	Penalties	Rank
Greg Broderick	Going Global	Individual	8	53 Q	5	13	50	Did not advance									

== Field hockey ==
Ireland qualified for the Olympics after finishing fifth in the 2014–15 Men's FIH Hockey World League Semifinals. Australia's 3–2 victory over New Zealand in the 2015 Oceania Cup confirmed Ireland's qualification. It was the first time Ireland played in an Olympic field hockey tournament since 1908.

Summary

Key:

- FT – After full time.
- P – Match decided by penalty-shootout.

Team	Event	Group stage						Quarterfinal	Semifinal	Final / BM	
Team	Event	Opposition Score	Opposition Score	Opposition Score	Opposition Score	Opposition Score	Rank	Opposition Score	Opposition Score	Opposition Score	Rank
Ireland men's	Men's tournament	India; L 2–3	Netherlands; L 0–5	Germany; L 2–3	Canada; W 4–2	Argentina; L 2–3	5	Did not advance			10

Team roster

The following is the Irish roster in the men's field hockey tournament of the 2016 Summer Olympics.

Head coach: Craig Fulton

1. David Harte (GK) (C)
3. John Jackson
4. Jonathan Bell
6. Ronan Gormley
7. Michael Watt
8. Chris Cargo
10. Alan Sothern
11. John Jermyn
12. Eugene Magee
13. Peter Caruth
14. Kirk Shimmins
16. Shane O'Donoghue
20. Michael Darling
24. Kyle Good
26. Paul Gleghorne
27. Conor Harte

Reserves:

- Tim Cockram
- Michael Robson
- David Fitzgerald

Group play

Pos	Team	Pld	W	D	L	GF	GA	GD	Pts	Qualification
1	Germany	5	4	1	0	17	10	+7	13	Quarter-finals
2	Netherlands	5	3	1	1	18	6	+12	10	Quarter-finals
3	Argentina	5	2	2	1	14	12	+2	8	Quarter-finals
4	India	5	2	1	2	9	9	0	7	Quarter-finals
5	Ireland	5	1	0	4	10	16	−6	3	
6	Canada	5	0	1	4	7	22	−15	1	

Source: Rio2016
Rules for classification: 1) Points; 2) Matches won; 3) Goal difference; 4) Goals for; 5) Head-to-head result.

6 August 2016
11:00

India	3–2	Ireland
Raghunath 15+'; Ru. Singh 27', 49'	Report	Shimmins 45'; Harte 56'

Umpires:
Murray Grime (AUS)
Paco Vázquez (ESP)

7 August 2016
18:00

Netherlands	5–0	Ireland
van der Weerden 7', 40'; Croon 8'; Pruijser 42'; Hertzberger 60'	Report

Umpires:
Nathan Stagno (GBR)
Tim Pullman (AUS)

9 August 2016
12:30

Germany	3–2	Ireland
Fürste 13', 38'; Zwicker 42'	Report	Magee 26'; Darling 59'

Umpires:
Marcelo Servetto (ESP)
Lim Hong Zhen (SIN)

11 August 2016
11:00

Ireland	4–2	Canada
O'Donoghue 1', 28'; Caruth 29'; Darling 57'	Report	Tupper 37', 50'

Umpires:
Marcelo Servetto (ESP)
Nathan Stagno (GBR)

12 August 2016
19:30

Ireland	2–3	Argentina
Jermyn 25'; O'Donoghue 51'	Report	Saladino 8'; Peillat 27', 51'

Umpires:
Simon Taylor (NZL)
Paco Vázquez (ESP)

== Golf ==
Ireland entered four golfers (two per gender) into the Olympic tournament. Pádraig Harrington (world no. 148), Séamus Power (world no. 290), and Leona Maguire (world no. 353) qualified directly among the top 60 eligible players for their respective individual events based on the IGF World Rankings as of 11 July 2016. Meanwhile, Stephanie Meadow received a spare Olympic berth freed up by the Dutch golfers, as second replacement, to join Maguire in the women's tournament. Paul McGinley is the non-playing team leader.

Harrington and Power were confirmed for selection on 14 July, three weeks after the withdrawal in quick succession of Rory McIlroy, Shane Lowry, and Graeme McDowell (world ranked 4, 25, and 57 respectively). McIlroy and Lowry blamed the Zika epidemic while McDowell stated he wanted to be with his pregnant wife. McIlroy and McDowell are from Northern Ireland and there had been speculation in previous years about whether they would choose to represent Ireland or Great Britain, McDowell deciding in 2013 and McIlroy in 2014.

Athlete	Event	Round 1	Round 2	Round 3	Round 4	Total		
Athlete	Event	Score	Score	Score	Score	Score	Par	Rank
Pádraig Harrington	Men's	70	71	67	73	281	−3	=21
Séamus Power	Men's	71	67	74	67	279	−5	=15
Leona Maguire	Women's	74	65	74	69	282	–2	=21
Stephanie Meadow	Women's	77	66	71	72	286	+2	=31

== Gymnastics ==
=== Artistic ===
Ireland entered two artistic gymnasts into the Olympic competition, including a first female Irish gymnast. London 2012 Olympian Kieran Behan and Ellis O'Reilly had claimed their Olympic spots each in the men's and women's apparatus and all-around events, respectively, at the Olympic Test Event in Rio de Janeiro.

Men

Athlete	Event	Qualification								Final							
Athlete	Event	Apparatus						Total	Rank	Apparatus						Total	Rank
Athlete	Event	F	PH	R	V	PB	HB	Total	Rank	F	PH	R	V	PB	HB	Total	Rank
Kieran Behan	All-around	14.333	12.866	14.133	14.300	14.000	13.600	82.232	38	Did not advance							

Women

Athlete	Event	Qualification						Final					
Athlete	Event	Apparatus				Total	Rank	Apparatus				Total	Rank
Athlete	Event	V	UB	BB	F	Total	Rank	V	UB	BB	F	Total	Rank
Ellis O'Reilly	All-around	13.266	12.300	10.700	11.666	48.732	57	Did not advance					

== Modern pentathlon ==
Ireland qualified two modern pentathletes for the following events at the Games. London 2012 Olympian Arthur Lanigan-O'Keeffe claimed one of the eight available Olympic slots with a first-place finish in the men's event at the 2015 European Championships. Meanwhile, O'Keeffe's teammate Natalya Coyle was granted an invitation from UIPM to compete in the women's event for the second time, as one of the next highest-ranked eligible modern pentathletes, not yet qualified, in the same tournament.

Athlete	Event	Fencing (épée one touch)				Swimming (200 m freestyle)			Riding (show jumping)			Combined: shooting/running (10 m air pistol)/(3200 m)			Total points	Final rank
Athlete	Event	RR	BR	Rank	MP points	Time	Rank	MP points	Penalties	Rank	MP points	Time	Rank	MP points	Total points	Final rank
Arthur Lanigan-O'Keeffe	Men's	16–19	2	25	198	2:03:03	13	331	0.00	1	300	11:23.96	7	617	1446	8
Natalya Coyle	Women's	19–16	1	12	215	2:17.38	18	288	0.00	1	300	12:58.13	16	522	1325	6

== Rowing ==
Ireland qualified three boats for each of the following rowing classes into the Olympic regatta. Rowing crews in both the men's and women's lightweight double sculls confirmed Olympic places for their boats at the 2015 FISA World Championships in Lac d'Aiguebelette, France, while a women's single sculls rower added one more boat to the Irish roster as a result of her top three finish at the 2016 European & Final Qualification Regatta in Lucerne, Switzerland.

Athlete	Event	Heats		Repechage		Quarterfinals		Semifinals		Final	
Athlete	Event	Time	Rank	Time	Rank	Time	Rank	Time	Rank	Time	Rank
Gary O'Donovan; Paul O'Donovan	Men's lightweight double sculls	6:23:72	1 SA/B	Bye		—N/a		6:35.70	3 FA	6:31.23	2nd place, silver medalist(s)
Sanita Pušpure	Women's single sculls	9:11.45	2 QF	Bye		7:28.68	4 SC/D	7:53.48	1 FC	7:27.60	13
Sinéad Lynch; Claire Lambe	Women's lightweight double sculls	7:10.91	2 SA/B	Bye		—N/a		7:18.24	3 FA	7:13.09	6

Qualification Legend: FA=Final A (medal); FB=Final B (non-medal); FC=Final C (non-medal); FD=Final D (non-medal); FE=Final E (non-medal); FF=Final F (non-medal); SA/B=Semifinals A/B; SC/D=Semifinals C/D; SE/F=Semifinals E/F; QF=Quarterfinals; R=Repechage

== Sailing ==
Irish sailors qualified one boat in each of the following classes through the 2014 ISAF Sailing World Championships, the individual fleet Worlds, and European qualifying regattas. Meanwhile, the 49erFX crew claimed an Olympic place on the Irish sailing team by picking up the unused berth freed by the African continental selection based on the results at the 2015 World Championships.

Athlete	Event	Race													Net points	Final rank
Athlete	Event	1	2	3	4	5	6	7	8	9	10	11	12	M*	Net points	Final rank
Finn Lynch	Men's Laser	14	27	15	39	18	27	33	30	40	~~47~~	—N/a		EL	243	32
Matt McGovern; Ryan Seaton	Men's 49er	14	2	4	1	14	19	12	7	13	19	~~20~~	1	18	121	10
Annalise Murphy	Women's Laser Radial	1	13	4	7	5	2	~~18~~	12	6	7	—N/a		10	67	2nd place, silver medalist(s)
Andrea Brewster; Saskia Tidey	Women's 49erFX	8	3	6	18	13	14	~~19~~	6	18	8	13	12	EL	119	12

M = Medal race; EL = Eliminated – did not advance into the medal race; ~~strikethrough~~ – each sailor/team discards their worst result

== Swimming ==
Irish swimmers achieved qualifying standards in the following events (up to a maximum of 2 swimmers in each event at the Olympic Qualifying Time (OQT), and potentially 1 at the Olympic Selection Time (OST)):

Athlete	Event	Heat		Semifinal		Final	
Athlete	Event	Time	Rank	Time	Rank	Time	Rank
Nicholas Quinn	Men's 100 m breaststroke	1:01.29	33	Did not advance			
Nicholas Quinn	Men's 200 m breaststroke	2:11.67	19	Did not advance			
Shane Ryan	Men's 50 m freestyle	22.88	43	Did not advance			
Shane Ryan	Men's 100 m freestyle	49.82	40	Did not advance			
Shane Ryan	Men's 100 m backstroke	53.85 NR	14 Q	54.40	16	Did not advance	
Fiona Doyle	Women's 100 m breaststroke	1:07.58	20	Did not advance			
Fiona Doyle	Women's 200 m breaststroke	2:29.76	25	Did not advance			

== Triathlon ==
Ireland qualified two triathletes for the following events at the Olympics. Bryan Keane and London 2012 Olympian Aileen Morrison were ranked among the top 40 eligible triathletes each in the men's and women's event, respectively, based on the ITU Olympic Qualification List as of May 15, 2016.

Athlete	Event	Swim (1.5 km)	Trans 1	Bike (40 km)	Trans 2	Run (10 km)	Total Time	Rank
Bryan Keane	Men's	18:10	0:57	59:30	0:41	32:51	1:52.09	40
Aileen Morrison	Women's	19:19	0:54	1:04:31	0:42	35:48	2:01:14	21

== See also ==
- Ireland at the 2016 Summer Paralympics
