= Equestrian at the 2016 Summer Olympics – Individual eventing =

Individual eventing at the Games of the XXXI Olympiad
- Venue: National Equestrian Center
- Date: 6–9 August 2016
- Competitors: 65 from 24 nations
- Winning total: 40.90 points

Medalists
1st place, gold medalist(s)		Michael Jung	Germany
2nd place, silver medalist(s)		Astier Nicolas	France
3rd place, bronze medalist(s)		Phillip Dutton	United States

The individual eventing in equestrian at the Rio 2016 Summer Olympics was held at the National Equestrian Center from 6 - 9 August.

== Competition format ==
The team and individual eventing competitions used the same scores. Eventing consisted of a dressage test, a cross-country test, and a jumping test. The jumping test had two rounds. After the first jumping round, the teams results were determined. Both jumping rounds counted towards the individual results. Only the top 25 horse and rider pairs (including ties for 25th) after the first jumping round (adding the three components) competed in the second jumping round. However, each nation was limited to a maximum of three pairs qualifying for the second (final) jumping round.

== Schedule ==
Times are Brasília time, BRT (UTC−03:00)

Date	Time	Round
Saturday, 6 August 2016; Sunday, 7 August 2016	10:00	Dressage
Monday, 8 August 2016	10:00	Cross-country
Tuesday, 9 August 2016	10:00	Jumping qualification and final jumping

== Results ==
=== Standings after dressage ===
Rank	Rider	Horse	Nationality	Dressage
1	William Fox-Pitt	Chilli Morning	Great Britain	37.00
2	Chris Burton	Santano II	Australia	37.60
3	Mathieu Lemoine	Bart L	France	39.20
4	Ingrid Klimke	Hale-Bob Old	Germany	39.50
5	Michael Jung	Sam FBW	Germany	40.90
6	Thibaut Vallette	Qing du Briot	France	41.00
7	Karin Donckers	Fletcha van't Verahof	Belgium	41.10
8	Sandra Auffarth	Opgun Louvo	Germany	41.60
9	Jonty Evans	Cooley Rorke's Drift	Ireland	41.80
10	Stefano Brecciaroli	Apollo WD Wendi Kurt	Italy	41.90
11	Astier Nicolas	Piaf de B'Neville	France	42.00
12	Alex Hua Tian	Don Geniro	China	42.40
13	Shane Rose	CP Qualified	Australia	42.50
14	Karim Laghouag	Entebbe	France	43.40
15	Phillip Dutton	Mighty Nice	United States	43.60
16	Pippa Funnell	Billy the Biz	Great Britain	43.90
17	Mark Todd	Leonidas II	New Zealand	44.00
18	Julia Krajewski	Samourai du Thot	Germany	44.80
19	Sara Algotsson Ostholt	Reality 39	Sweden	45.40
20	Tim Lips	Bayro	Netherlands	46.00
21	Alice Naber-Lozeman	Peter Parker	Netherlands	46.20
22	Sam Griffiths	Paulank Brockagh	Australia	46.30
23	Clarke Johnstone	Balmoral Sensation	New Zealand	46.50
24	Clark Montgomery	Loughan Glen	United States	46.60
25	Felix Vogg	Onfire	Switzerland	46.70
26	Padraig McCarthy	Simon Porloe	Ireland	46.80
26	Ruy Fonseca	Tom Bombadill Too	Brazil	46.80
26	Kitty King	Ceylor L A N	Great Britain	46.80
29	Tim Price	Ringwood Sky Boy	New Zealand	47.00
29	Clare Abbott	Euro Prince	Ireland	47.00
29	Yoshiaki Oiwa	The Duke of Cavan	Japan	47.00
32	Gemma Tattersall	Quicklook V	Great Britain	47.20
33	Carlos Paro	Summon Up the Blood	Brazil	47.30
33	Lauren Kieffer	Veronica	United States	47.30
35	Boyd Martin	Blackfoot Mystery	United States	47.70
36	Frida Andersen	Herta	Sweden	47.90
37	Elmo Jankari	Duchess Desiree	Finland	48.00
38	Pietro Roman	Barraduff	Italy	48.20
39	Aleksandr Markov	Kurfürstin	Russia	48.90
40	Carlos Lobos	Ranco	Chile	49.30
41	Kathryn Robinson	Let It Bee	Canada	49.40
41	Rebecca Howard	Riddle Master	Canada	49.40
43	Jonelle Price	Faerie Dianimo	New Zealand	49.50
44	Márcio Jorge	Lissy Mac Wayer	Brazil	50.00
45	Mark Kyle	Jemilla	Ireland	50.40
46	Luca Roman	Castlewoods Jake	Italy	50.80
47	Linda Algotsson	Fairnet	Sweden	50.90
48	Ludvig Svennerstål	Aspe	Sweden	51.00
49	Ben Vogg	Noe Des Vatys	Switzerland	51.70
50	Jessica Phoenix	A Little Romance	Canada	52.00
51	Paweł Spisak	Banderas	Poland	53.60
52	Joris Vanspringel	Lully des Aulnes	Belgium	54.30
53	Merel Blom	Rumor Has It	Netherlands	54.40
54	Arianna Schivo	Quefira de l'Ormeau	Italy	55.00
55	Nicolas Wettstein	Nadeville Merze	Ecuador	56.00
55	Lauren Billys	Castle Larchfield Purdy	Puerto Rico	56.00
57	Colleen Loach	Qorry Blue D'Argouges	Canada	56.50
58	Stuart Tinney	Pluto Mio	Australia	56.80
59	Márcio Appel	Iberon Jmen	Brazil	57.20
60	Ryuzo Kitajima	Just Chocolate	Japan	57.70
61	Camilla Kruger	Biarritz	Zimbabwe	59.40
62	Andrey Mitin	Gurza	Russia	59.90
63	Albert Hermoso Farras	Hito CP	Spain	64.30
64	Theo van de Vendel	Zidane	Netherlands	65.70
65	Evgeniya Ovchinnikova	Orion	Russia	66.00

=== Standings after cross country ===
Rank	Rider	Horse	Nationality	Dressage	Cross Country	Total
1	Chris Burton	Santano II	Australia	37.60	0.00	37.60
2	Michael Jung	Sam FBW	Germany	40.90	0.00	40.90
3	Astier Nicolas	Piaf de B'Neville	France	42.00	0.00	42.00
4	Mark Todd	Leonidas II	New Zealand	44.00	2.00	46.00
5	Phillip Dutton	Mighty Nice	United States	43.60	3.20	46.80
6	Boyd Martin	Blackfoot Mystery	United States	47.70	3.20	50.90
7	Carlos Paro	Summon Up the Blood	Brazil	47.30	4.00	51.30
7	Clarke Johnstone	Balmoral Sensation	New Zealand	46.50	4.80	51.30
9	Sam Griffiths	Paulank Brockagh	Australia	46.30	6.80	53.10
10	Mathieu Lemoine	Bart L	France	39.20	14.40	53.60
11	Alex Hua Tian	Don Geniro	China	42.40	13.20	55.60
12	Frida Andersen	Herta	Sweden	47.90	9.20	57.10
13	Jonelle Price	Faerie Dianimo	New Zealand	49.50	8.00	57.50
14	Stuart Tinney	Pluto Mio	Australia	56.80	2.80	59.60
15	Rebecca Howard	Riddle Master	Canada	49.40	12.40	61.80
16	Jonty Evans	Cooley Rorke's Drift	Ireland	41.80	22.80	64.60
17	Yoshiaki Oiwa	The Duke of Cavan	Japan	47.00	18.00	65.00
18	Thibaut Vallette	Qing du Briot	France	41.00	14.40	65.40
19	Ingrid Klimke	Hale-Bob Old	Germany	39.50	26.00	65.50
20	Sandra Auffarth	Opgun Louvo	Germany	41.60	24.80	66.40
20	Merel Blom	Rumor Has It	Netherlands	54.40	12.00	66.40
22	William Fox-Pitt	Chilli Morning	Great Britain	37.00	30.40	67.40
23	Pietro Roman	Barraduff	Italy	48.20	20.00	68.20
24	Marcio Jorge	Lissy Mac Wayer	Brazil	50.00	20.00	70.00
25	Tim Lips	Bayro	Netherlands	46.00	28.00	74.00
26	Joris Vanspringel	Lully des Aulnes	Belgium	54.30	21.60	75.90
27	Ludvig Svennerstål	Aspe	Sweden	51.00	28.40	79.40
28	Pippa Funnell	Billy the Biz	Great Britain	43.90	40.40	84.30
29	Elmo Jankari	Duchess Desiree	Finland	48.00	42.80	90.80
30	Carlos Lobos	Ranco	Chile	49.30	42.80	92.10
31	Karim Laghouag	Entebbe	France	43.40	50.40	93.80
32	Alice Naber-Lozeman	Peter Parker	Netherlands	46.20	52.00	98.20
33	Camilla Kruger	Biarritz	Zimbabwe	59.40	40.40	99.80
34	Kitty King	Ceylor L A N	Great Britain	46.80	53.60	100.40
35	Mark Kyle	Jemilla	Ireland	50.40	50.80	101.20
36	Arianna Schivo	Quefira de l'Ormeau	Italy	55.00	50.40	105.40
37	Sara Algotsson Ostholt	Reality 39	Sweden	45.40	61.20	106.60
38	Clare Abbott	Euro Prince	Ireland	47.00	107.90	112.60
39	Márcio Appel	Iberon Jmen	Brazil	57.20	64.40	121.60
40	Luca Roman	Castlewoods Jake	Italy	50.80	71.60	122.40
41	Jessica Phoenix	A Little Romance	Canada	52.00	75.60	127.60
42	Ryuzo Kitajima	Just Chocolate	Japan	57.70	74.40	132.10
43	Ben Vogg	Noe Des Vatys	Switzerland	51.70	82.40	134.10
44	Gemma Tattersall	Quicklook V	Great Britain	47.20	89.60	136.80
45	Colleen Loach	Qorry Blue D'Argouges	Canada	56.50	85.20	141.70
46	Lauren Billys	Castle Larchfield Purdy	Puerto Rico	56.00	88.40	144.40
47	Ruy Fonseca	Tom Bombadill Too	Brazil	46.80	112.00	158.80
48	Linda Algotsson	Fairnet	Sweden	50.90	109.60	160.50
-	Clark Montgomery	Loughan Glen	United States	46.60	Retired	
-	Nicolas Wettstein	Nadeville Merze	Ecuador	56.00	Retired	
-	Karin Donckers	Fletcha van't Verahof	Belgium	41.10	Eliminated	
-	Stefano Brecciaroli	Apollo WD Wendi Kurt	Italy	41.90	Eliminated	
-	Shane Rose	CP Qualified	Australia	42.50	Eliminated	
-	Julia Krajewski	Samourai du Thot	Germany	44.80	Eliminated	
-	Felix Vogg	Onfire	Switzerland	46.70	Eliminated	
-	Padraig McCarthy	Simon Porloe	Ireland	46.80	Eliminated	
-	Tim Price	Ringwood Sky Boy	New Zealand	47.00	Eliminated	
-	Lauren Kieffer	Veronica	United States	47.30	Eliminated	
-	Aleksandr Markov	Kurfürstin	Russia	48.90	Eliminated	
-	Kathryn Robinson	Let It Bee	Canada	49.40	Eliminated	
-	Paweł Spisak	Banderas	Poland	53.60	Eliminated	
-	Andrey Mitin	Gurza	Russia	59.90	Eliminated	
-	Albert Hermoso Farras	Hito CP	Spain	64.30	Eliminated	
-	Theo van de Vendel	Zidane	Netherlands	65.70	Eliminated	
-	Evgeniya Ovchinnikova	Orion	Russia	66.00	Withdrew	

=== Standings after jumping (round 1) ===
Top 25 qualify for the final with a maximum of 3 riders per Nation (NOC).

Rank	Rider	Horse	Nationality	Dressage	Cross-country	Jumping 1	Total
1	Michael Jung	Sam FBW	Germany	40.90	0.00	0.00	40.90
2	Astier Nicolas	Piaf de B'Neville	France	42.00	0.00	0.00	42.00
3	Chris Burton	Santano II	Australia	37.60	0.00	8.00	45.60
4	Phillip Dutton	Mighty Nice	United States	43.60	3.20	1.00	47.80
5	Clarke Johnstone	Balmoral Sensation	New Zealand	46.50	4.80	0.00	51.30
6	Sam Griffiths	Paulank Brockagh	Australia	46.30	6.80	0.00	53.10
7	Boyd Martin	Blackfoot Mystery	United States	47.70	3.20	8.00	58.90
8	Alex Hua Tian	Don Geniro	China	42.40	13.20	4.00	59.60
9	Mathieu Lemoine	Bart L	France	39.20	14.40	8.00	61.60
10	Rebecca Howard	Riddle Master	Canada	49.40	12.40	0.00	61.80
11	Mark Todd	Leonidas II	New Zealand	44.00	2.00	16.00	62.00
12	Carlos Paro	Summon Up the Blood	Brazil	47.30	4.00	12.00	63.30
13	Jonty Evans	Cooley Rorke's Drift	Ireland	41.80	22.80	0.00	64.60
14	Thibaut Vallette	Qing du Briot	France	41.00	14.40	0.00	65.40
15	Jonelle Price	Faerie Dianimo	New Zealand	49.50	8.00	8.00	65.50
15	Ingrid Klimke	Hale-Bob Old	Germany	39.50	26.00	0.00	65.50
17	Sandra Auffarth	Opgun Louvo	Germany	41.60	24.80	0.00	66.40
18	William Fox-Pitt	Chilli Morning	Great Britain	37.00	30.40	0.00	67.40
19	Merel Blom	Rumor Has It	Netherlands	54.40	12.00	2.00	68.40
20	Yoshiaki Oiwa	The Duke of Cavan	Japan	47.00	18.00	4.00	69.00
21	Stuart Tinney	Pluto Mio	Australia	56.80	2.80	17.00	76.60
22	Marcio Jorge	Lissy Mac Wayer	Brazil	50.00	20.00	10.00	80.00
23	Tim Lips	Bayro	Netherlands	46.00	28.00	8.00	82.00
24	Pietro Roman	Barraduff	Italy	48.20	20.00	14.00	82.20
25	Joris Vanspringel	Lully des Aulnes	Belgium	54.30	21.60	8.00	83.90
26	Pippa Funnell	Billy the Biz	Great Britain	43.90	40.40	0.00	84.30
27	Ludvig Svennerstål	Aspe	Sweden	51.00	28.40	8.00	87.40
28	Karim Laghouag	Entebbe	France	43.40	50.40	1.00	94.80
29	Carlos Lobos	Ranco	Chile	49.30	42.80	4.00	96.10
30	Kitty King	Ceylor L A N	Great Britain	46.80	53.60	0.00	100.40
31	Elmo Jankari	Duchess Desiree	Finland	48.00	42.80	10.00	100.80
32	Alice Naber-Lozeman	Peter Parker	Netherlands	46.20	52.00	4.00	102.20
33	Mark Kyle	Jemilla	Ireland	50.40	50.80	8.00	109.20
34	Arianna Schivo	Quefira de l'Ormeau	Italy	55.00	50.40	4.00	109.40
35	Camilla Kruger	Biarritz	Zimbabwe	59.40	40.40	12.00	111.80
36	Sara Algotsson Ostholt	Reality 39	Sweden	45.40	61.20	6.00	112.60
36	Clare Abbott	Euro Prince	Ireland	47.00	107.90	0.00	112.60
38	Jessica Phoenix	A Little Romance	Canada	52.00	75.60	4.00	131.60
39	Márcio Appel	Iberon Jmen	Brazil	57.20	64.40	16.00	137.60
40	Luca Roman	Castlewoods Jake	Italy	50.80	71.60	16.00	138.40
41	Gemma Tattersall	Quicklook V	Great Britain	47.20	89.60	4.00	140.80
42	Colleen Loach	Qorry Blue D'Argouges	Canada	56.50	85.20	4.00	145.70
43	Ben Vogg	Noe Des Vatys	Switzerland	51.70	82.40	14.00	148.10
44	Lauren Billys	Castle Larchfield Purdy	Puerto Rico	56.00	88.40	11.00	155.40
45	Linda Algotsson	Fairnet	Sweden	50.90	109.60	4.00	164.50
-	Ruy Fonseca	Tom Bombadill Too	Brazil	46.80	112.00	Eliminated	
-	Frida Andersen	Herta	Sweden	47.90	9.20	Withdrew	
-	Ryuzo Kitajima	Just Chocolate	Japan	57.70	74.40	Withdrew	

=== Final results after jumping (round 2) ===
Rank	Rider	Horse	Nationality	Dressage	Cross-country	Jumping	Total (After Jumping 1)	Final jumping	Total
1st place, gold medalist(s)	Michael Jung	Sam FBW	Germany	40.90	0.00	0.00	40.90	0.00	40.90
2nd place, silver medalist(s)	Astier Nicolas	Piaf de B'Neville	France	42.00	0.00	0.00	42.00	6.00	48.00
3rd place, bronze medalist(s)	Phillip Dutton	Mighty Nice	United States	43.60	3.20	1.00	47.80	4.00	51.80
4	Sam Griffiths	Paulank Brockagh	Australia	46.30	6.80	0.00	53.10	0.00	53.10
5	Chris Burton	Santano II	Australia	37.60	0.00	8.00	45.60	8.00	53.60
6	Clarke Johnstone	Balmoral Sensation	New Zealand	46.50	4.80	0.00	51.30	8.00	59.30
7	Mark Todd	Leonidas II	New Zealand	44.00	2.00	16.00	62.00	0.00	62.00
8	Alex Hua Tian	Don Geniro	China	42.40	13.20	4.00	59.60	4.00	63.60
9	Jonty Evans	Cooley Rorke's Drift	Ireland	41.80	22.80	0.00	64.60	0.00	64.60
10	Rebecca Howard	Riddle Master	Canada	49.40	12.40	0.00	61.80	4.00	65.80
11	Sandra Auffarth	Opgun Louvo	Germany	41.60	24.80	0.00	66.40	0.00	66.40
12	William Fox-Pitt	Chilli Morning	Great Britain	37.00	30.40	0.00	67.40	0.00	67.40
13	Thibaut Vallette	Qing du Briot	France	41.00	14.40	0.00	65.40	4.00	69.40
14	Ingrid Klimke	Hale-Bob Old	Germany	39.50	26.00	0.00	65.50	4.00	69.50
15	Mathieu Lemoine	Bart L	France	39.20	14.40	8.00	61.60	8.00	69.60
16	Boyd Martin	Blackfoot Mystery	United States	47.70	3.20	8.00	58.90	12.00	70.90
17	Jonelle Price	Faerie Dianimo	New Zealand	49.50	8.00	8.00	65.50	8.00	73.50
18	Carlos Paro	Summon Up the Blood	Brazil	47.30	4.00	12.00	63.30	12.00	75.30
19	Merel Blom	Rumor Has It	Netherlands	54.40	12.00	2.00	68.40	8.00	76.40
20	Yoshiaki Oiwa	The Duke of Cavan	Japan	47.00	18.00	4.00	69.00	8.00	77.00
21	Tim Lips	Bayro	Netherlands	46.00	28.00	8.00	82.00	0.00	82.00
22	Stuart Tinney	Pluto Mio	Australia	56.80	2.80	17.00	76.60	8.00	84.60
23	Pietro Roman	Barraduff	Italy	48.20	20.00	14.00	82.20	4.00	86.20
24	Joris Vanspringel	Lully des Aulnes	Belgium	54.30	21.60	8.00	83.90	4.00	87.90
25	Marcio Jorge	Lissy Mac Wayer	Brazil	50.00	20.00	10.00	80.00	8.00	88.00
