= Vogg (surname) =

Vogg is a surname. Notable people with the surname include:

- Ben Vogg (born 1992), Swiss equestrian
- Felix Vogg (born 1990), Swiss equestrian
- Flemming Vögg (1914–1991), Danish fencer
