= Conor Harte =

Ireland men's field hockey international

Personal information
- Full name: Conor Harte
- Born: 3 April 1988 (age 38) County Cork, Ireland
- Height: 6 ft 5 in (196 cm)

Sport
- Sport: Field hockey
- Position: Sweeper/Centre Back
- Club: Dragons
Youth career
- Years: Team
- 2000–2006: Bandon Grammar School
Senior career
Years	Team	Caps	Goals
200x–2006	Cork Harlequins	-	-
2006–2010	Pembroke Wanderers	-	-
2006–2010	→ DCU	-	-
2010–2013	SCHC	-	-
2013–2014	Pembroke Wanderers	-	-
2014–2021	Racing Club de Bruxelles	-	-
2015	→ Dabang Mumbai	-	-
2021–present	Dragons	-	-
National team
Years	Team	Caps	Goals
2006–present	Ireland	259	(48)
Medal record
Representing Ireland
EuroHockey Championship
Bronze medal – third place	2015 London

Conor Harte (born 3 April 1988) is an Ireland men's field hockey international. He played for Ireland at both the 2016 Summer Olympics and the 2018 Men's Hockey World Cup. He was also a member of the Ireland team that won the bronze medal at the 2015 Men's EuroHockey Championship. Harte has won national league titles in Ireland and has played in the Hockey India League. Harte's twin brother, David, and his sister, Emer, are also Ireland field hockey internationals. The Harte brothers have lined out together with eight different field hockey teams – Bandon Grammar School, Cork Harlequins, Pembroke Wanderers, DCU, SCHC, Dabang Mumbai, Munster and Ireland.

== Early years, family and education ==
Harte was raised in Ballinspittle, near Kinsale, West Cork. His mother was from Ballyheigue, County Kerry where his grandfather won county hurling medals. His father, Kieran Harte is a member of the prominent Tyrone GAA family. He was a goalkeeper for Tyrone in the 1972 Ulster Senior Football Championship final. Kieran's teammates on the day included his first cousin, Mickey Harte. Consequently, Conor Harte is also a cousin of Michaela McAreavey, Mark Harte, Peter Harte and the Gaelic footballer, David Harte. Harte's twin brother, David, is also an Ireland men's field hockey international and his sister, Emer is an Ireland women's field hockey international. In his youth Harte played gaelic games with Courcey Rovers. Harte was educated at Bandon Grammar School. Between 2006 and 2009 he attended Dublin City University where he gained a BA in accounting and finance. In 2014 he gained a Diploma of Education from Trinity College Dublin. In 2018 he began studying for a PhD at Cork Institute of Technology.

== Domestic teams ==
=== Bandon Grammar School ===
Harte began playing field hockey at the age of thirteen at Bandon Grammar School. In 2005 Conor and David helped Bandon win the All Ireland Schoolboys Hockey Championship.

=== Cork Harlequins ===
While studying for their Leaving Cert at Bandon Grammar School, Conor and David, also played for Cork Harlequins, helping them win the 2006 Irish Senior Cup.

=== Pembroke Wanderers ===
While studying at Dublin City University, Harte also began playing for Pembroke Wanderers. In 2008–09, together with his brother David, Ronan Gormley, Stuart Loughrey, Justin Sheriff, Craig Fulton and Alan Sothern, Harte was a member of the Pembroke Wanderers team that won the Irish Senior Cup, the Men's Irish Hockey League and the EuroHockey Club Trophy. While playing for Wanderers, the Harte brothers also represented DCU at intervarsity level.

=== SCHC ===
In 2010 Harte began playing for SCHC. His brother, David, also played for SCHC.

=== Racing Club de Bruxelles ===
Since 2014 Harte has played for Racing Club de Bruxelles in the Men's Belgian Hockey League. He also played for Racing in the 2017–18 Euro Hockey League. His teammates at Racing have included Alan Sothern.

=== Dabang Mumbai ===
Harte played for Dabang Mumbai in the 2015 Hockey India League season, once again teaming up with his brother David. In the players' auction he was drafted for $10,000.

=== Dragons ===
After seven years at Racing he joined Dragons in the summer of 2021.

== Ireland international ==
Harte made his senior debut for Ireland in August 2006 in a Celtic Cup game against France. Harte's brother, David, and his sister, Emer, also made their senior international debuts on the same day. Harte was a member of the Ireland teams that won the 2009 Men's EuroHockey Nations Trophy and the 2011 Men's Hockey Champions Challenge II. He also helped Ireland win Men's FIH Hockey World League tournaments in 2012, 2015 and 2017. On 1 June 2017, Harte made his 200th senior appearance for Ireland in a 2–2 with Pakistan. He marked the occasion by scoring from a penalty corner. Harte was also a member of the Ireland team that won the bronze medal at the 2015 Men's EuroHockey Nations Championship. He represented Ireland at the 2016 Summer Olympics and at the 2018 Men's Hockey World Cup.

Tournaments	Place
2009 Men's Hockey Champions Challenge II	2nd
2009 Men's EuroHockey Nations Trophy	1st
2009 Men's Hockey World Cup Qualifiers	3rd
2011 Men's Hockey Champions Challenge II	1st
2011 Men's EuroHockey Nations Championship	5th
2012 Men's Field Hockey Olympic Qualifier	2nd
2012–13 Men's FIH Hockey World League Round 1	1st
2012 Men's Hockey Champions Challenge I	3rd
2012–13 Men's FIH Hockey World League Round 2	2nd
2012–13 Men's FIH Hockey World League Semifinals	7th
2013 Men's EuroHockey Nations Championship	6th
2014 Men's Hockey Champions Challenge I	4th
2014 Men's Hockey Investec Cup	2nd
2014–15 Men's FIH Hockey World League Round 2	1st
2014–15 Men's FIH Hockey World League Semifinals	5th
2015 Men's EuroHockey Nations Championship	3rd place, bronze medalist(s)
2016 Summer Olympics	10th
2016–17 Men's FIH Hockey World League Round 2	1st
2016–17 Men's FIH Hockey World League Semifinals	5th
2017 Men's EuroHockey Nations Championship	6th
2018 Men's Hockey World Cup	14th
2018–19 Men's FIH Series Finals	2nd
2019 Men's EuroHockey Nations Championship	8th

== Honours ==
Ireland

- Men's FIH Hockey World League Round 1
  - Winners: 2012 Cardiff
- Men's FIH Hockey World League Round 2
  - Winners: 2015 San Diego, 2017 Belfast
  - Runners up: 2013 New Delhi
- Men's FIH Series Finals
  - Runners up: 2019 Le Touquet
- Men's Hockey Champions Challenge II
  - Winners: 2011
  - Runners up: 2009
- Men's EuroHockey Nations Trophy
  - Winners: 2009
- Men's Field Hockey Olympic Qualifier
  - Runners up: 2012
- Men's Hockey Investec Cup
  - Runners up: 2014

Pembroke Wanderers

- EuroHockey Club Trophy
  - Winners: 2009: 1
- Men's Irish Hockey League
  - Winners: 2008–09
- Irish Senior Cup
  - Winners: 2008, 2009: 2

Cork Harlequins

- Irish Senior Cup
  - Winners: 2006: 1

Bandon Grammar School

- All Ireland Schoolboys Hockey Championship
  - Winners: 2005: 1
