= David Harte (field hockey) =

Irish field hockey goalkeeper (b. 1988)

Personal information
- Full name: David J Harte
- Born: 3 April 1988 (age 38) County Cork, Ireland
- Height: 6 ft 5 in (196 cm)

Sport
- Sport: Field hockey
- Position: Goalkeeper
Youth career
- Years: Team
- 2000–2006: Bandon Grammar School
Senior career
| Years | Team | Caps | Goals |
| 200x–2006 | Cork Harlequins | - | - |
| 2006–2010 | Pembroke Wanderers | - | - |
| 2006–2010 | → DCU | - | - |
| 2010–2012 | SCHC | - | - |
| 2012– | SV Kampong | - | - |
| 2014 | → Mumbai Magicians | 10 | 0 |
| 2015–2017 | → Dabang Mumbai | 27 | 0 |
| 2018– | → UniKL | - | - |
National team
| Years | Team | Caps | Goals |
| 2006– | Ireland | 247 | (0) |
Medal record
Representing Ireland
EuroHockey Championships
| Bronze medal – third place | 2015 London | Team |

David Harte (born 3 April 1988) is an Ireland men's field hockey international. He captained Ireland at both the 2016 Summer Olympics and the 2018 Men's Hockey World Cup. He was also a member of the Ireland team that won the bronze medal at the 2015 Men's EuroHockey Nations Championship. At club level, he was a member of the SV Kampong team that won the 2015–16 Euro Hockey League. Harte has won national league titles in Ireland, the Netherlands and Malaysia and has played in the Hockey India League. In both 2015 and 2016 he was named the FIH Goalkeeper of the Year. Harte's twin brother, Conor, and his sister, Emer, are also Ireland field hockey internationals. The Harte brothers have lined out together with eight different field hockey teams – Bandon Grammar School, Cork Harlequins, Pembroke Wanderers, DCU, SCHC, Dabang Mumbai, Munster and Ireland.

== Early years, family and education ==
Harte was raised in Ballinspittle, near Kinsale, West Cork. His mother was from Ballyheigue, County Kerry where his grandfather won county hurling medals. His father, Kieran Harte is a member of the prominent Tyrone GAA family. He was a goalkeeper for Tyrone in the 1972 Ulster Senior Football Championship final. Kieran's teammates on the day included his first cousin, Mickey Harte. Consequently, David Harte is also a cousin of Michaela McAreavey, Mark Harte, Peter Harte and his Gaelic footballer namesake, David Harte. Harte's twin brother, Conor, is also an Ireland men's field hockey international and his sister, Emer is an Ireland women's field hockey international. In his youth Harte played gaelic games with Courcey Rovers and also played badminton and tennis. Harte was educated at Bandon Grammar School and at Dublin City University where he gained a Bachelor of Science in PE and biology and qualified to become a teacher. He is currently studying for an MA in Sports Business from Leeds Beckett University.

== Domestic teams ==
=== Bandon Grammar School ===
Harte began playing field hockey at the age of thirteen at Bandon Grammar School. In 2005 David and Conor Harte helped Bandon win the All Ireland Schoolboys Hockey Championship.

=== Cork Harlequins ===
While studying for their Leaving Cert at Bandon Grammar School, David and Conor Harte, also played for Cork Harlequins, helping them win the 2006 Irish Senior Cup.

=== Pembroke Wanderers ===
While studying at Dublin City University, Harte also began playing for Pembroke Wanderers. In 2008–09, together with his brother Conor, Ronan Gormley, Stuart Loughrey, Justin Sheriff, Craig Fulton and Alan Sothern, Harte was a member of the Pembroke Wanderers team that won the Irish Senior Cup, the Men's Irish Hockey League and the EuroHockey Club Trophy. While playing for Wanderers, the Harte brothers also represented DCU at intervarsity level.

=== SCHC ===
In 2010 Harte began playing for SCHC. Harte had just accepted a job offer as a PE teacher at Sutton Park School when SCHC invited him to play for them. His brother, Conor, also played for SCHC.

=== SV Kampong ===
In 2012 Harte began playing for SV Kampong. He was a member of the SV Kampong team that won the 2015–16 Euro Hockey League. In 2016–17 and 2017–18 he helped Kampong win the Hoofdklasse title.

=== Hockey India League ===
At the 2014 Hockey India League players' auction, Harte was drafted by Mumbai Magicians for $11,000. The 2015 Hockey India League season saw Harte drafted by Dabang Mumbai for $51,000. His brother Conor was also drafted by Dabang Mumbai for $10,000. Harte was retained by Dabang Mumbai for the 2016 and 2017 seasons. Dabang Mumbai retained him after paying $65,000 in the players' auction, making him the most expensive goalkeeper in the league. In 2017 Harte helped Dabang Mumbai finish as runners up in the league.

=== UniKL ===
With no Hockey India League in 2018, Harte played for UniKL in the Malaysia Hockey League, helping them win their first title. In 2019 he again played for UniKL in the Malaysia Hockey League.

== Ireland international ==
Harte made his senior debut for Ireland in August 2006 in a Celtic Cup game against France. Harte's brother, Conor, and his sister, Emer, also made their senior international debuts on the same day. Harte was a member of the Ireland teams that won the 2009 Men's EuroHockey Nations Trophy and the 2011 Men's Hockey Champions Challenge II. He also helped Ireland win Men's FIH Hockey World League tournaments in 2012, 2015 and 2017. He has captained the Ireland team since 2015. In 2015 Harte was named Goalkeeper of the Tournament at the World League Round 2, the World League Semifinals and the Men's EuroHockey Nations Championship. Along the way he helped Ireland qualify for the 2016 Summer Olympics and win the bronze medal at the 2015 EuroHockey Championships. He was subsequently named FIH Goalkeeper of the Year for the first time. He won the award for a second time in 2016. In June 2017 Harte was a member of the Ireland team that won the Hamburg Masters, defeating Germany 4–2 in the final.

| Tournaments | Place |
|---|---|
| 2007 Men's EuroHockey Nations Championship | 7th |
| 2008 Men's Field Hockey Olympic Qualifier | 4th |
| 2009 Men's Hockey Champions Challenge II | 2nd |
| 2009 Men's EuroHockey Nations Trophy | 1st |
| 2009 Men's Hockey World Cup Qualifiers | 3rd |
| 2011 Men's Hockey Champions Challenge II | 1st |
| 2011 Men's EuroHockey Nations Championship | 5th |
| 2012 Men's Field Hockey Olympic Qualifier | 2nd |
| 2012–13 Men's FIH Hockey World League Round 1 | 1st |
| 2012 Men's Hockey Champions Challenge I | 3rd |
| 2012–13 Men's FIH Hockey World League Round 2 | 2nd |
| 2012–13 Men's FIH Hockey World League Semifinals | 7th |
| 2013 Men's EuroHockey Nations Championship | 6th |
| 2014 Men's Hockey Champions Challenge I | 4th |
| 2014 Men's Hockey Investec Cup | 2nd |
| 2014–15 Men's FIH Hockey World League Round 2 | 1st |
| 2014–15 Men's FIH Hockey World League Semifinals | 5th |
| 2015 Men's EuroHockey Nations Championship | 3rd place, bronze medalist(s) |
| 2016 Summer Olympics | 10th |
| 2017 Hamburg Masters | 1st |
| 2016–17 Men's FIH Hockey World League Round 2 | 1st |
| 2016–17 Men's FIH Hockey World League Semifinals | 5th |
| 2017 Men's EuroHockey Nations Championship | 6th |
| 2018 Men's Four Nations Cup | 4th |
| 2018 Men's Hockey World Cup | 14th |
| 2018–19 Men's FIH Series Finals | 2nd |

== Honours ==
Ireland

- Hamburg Masters
  - Winners: 2017
- Men's FIH Hockey World League Round 1
  - Winners: 2012 Cardiff
- Men's FIH Hockey World League Round 2
  - Winners: 2015 San Diego, 2017 Belfast
  - Runners up: 2013 New Delhi
- Men's FIH Series Finals
  - Runners up: 2019 Le Touquet
- Men's Hockey Champions Challenge II
  - Winners: 2011
  - Runners up: 2009
- Men's EuroHockey Nations Trophy
  - Winners: 2009
- Men's Field Hockey Olympic Qualifier
  - Runners up: 2012
- Men's Hockey Investec Cup
  - Runners up: 2014

SV Kampong

- Euro Hockey League
  - Winners: 2015–16
  - Runners up: 2017–18
- Hoofdklasse
  - Winners: 2016–17, 2017–18
  - Runners up: 2014–15

UniKL

- Malaysia Hockey League
  - Winners: 2018, 2020

Dabang Mumbai

- Hockey India League
  - Runners up: 2017

Pembroke Wanderers

- EuroHockey Club Trophy
  - Winners: 2009: 1
- Men's Irish Hockey League
  - Winners: 2008–09
- Irish Senior Cup
  - Winners: 2008, 2009: 2

Cork Harlequins

- Irish Senior Cup
  - Winners: 2006: 1

Bandon Grammar School

- All Ireland Schoolboys Hockey Championship
  - Winners: 2005: 1

Individual

- FIH Goalkeeper of the Year
  - Winner: 2015, 2016

Goalkeeper of the Tournament
2012 Men's Hockey Champions Challenge I
2014 Men's Hockey Champions Challenge I
2014–15 Men's FIH Hockey World League Round 2
2014–15 Men's FIH Hockey World League Semifinals
2015 Men's EuroHockey Nations Championship
2016–17 Men's FIH Hockey World League Round 2

| Preceded by Jaap Stockmann | FIH Goalkeeper of the Year; 2015–2016 | Succeeded by Vincent Vanasch |
