= Jankar =

Jankar is a surname. People with the surname include:

- Mahadev Jankar, Indian politician
- Uttamrao Jankar, Indian politician

== See also ==
- Elmo Jankari, Finnish equestrian
