= Carlos Lobos =

Carlos Lobos may refer to:

- Carlos Lobos (footballer) (born 1997), Chilean footballer
- Carlos Lobos (equestrian) (born 1980), Chilean Olympic eventing rider
