= Hermoso =

Hermoso is a surname. Notable people with the name include:

- Albert Hermoso Farras (born 1978), Spanish Olympic eventing rider
- Eugenio Hermoso (1883–1963), Spanish painter
- Jennifer Hermoso (born 1990), Spanish footballer
- Manuel Hermoso (1935–2025), Canarian politician
- Mario Hermoso (born 1995), Spanish footballer
- Miguel Hermoso (born 1942), Spanish film director and screenwriter
- Remy Hermoso (born 1946), American baseball player
- Ximena Hermoso (born 1991), Mexican tennis player
