= Equestrian at the 2011 Pan American Games – Individual eventing =

Individual eventing at the 2011 Pan American Games
- Venues: Guadalajara Country Club; Hipica Club
- Dates: October 21–23
- Competitors: 49 from 13 nations

Medalists
Gold medal	Jessica Phoenix on Pavarotti	Canada
Silver medal	Hannah Burnett on Harbour Pilot	United States
Bronze medal	Bruce Davidson Jr on Foxwood High	United States

The individual eventing competition of the equestrian events at the 2011 Pan American Games took place in Mexico between October 21–23 at the Guadalajara Country Club and the Hipica Club. The defending Pan American champion was Karen O'Connor of the United States of America.

== Schedule ==
All times are Central Standard Time (UTC-6).

Date	Time	Round
October 21, 2011	9:00	Dressage
October 22, 2011	11:00	Cross Country
October 23, 2011	12:00	Jumping
October 23, 2011	15:30	Final Jumping

== Results ==
Rank	Rider	Horse	Nation	Dressage	Cross Country	Jumping	Final Jumping	Total
1st place, gold medalist(s)	Jessica Phoenix	Pavarotti	Canada	43.90	0	0	0	43.90
2nd place, silver medalist(s)	Hannah Burnett	Harbour Pilot	United States	45.20	0	0	0	45.20
3rd place, bronze medalist(s)	Bruce Davidson, Jr.	Absolute Liberty	United States	48.90	0	0	0	48.90
4	Jack Pollard	Schoensgreen Hanni	United States	44.50	0	0	8.00	52.50
5	Elena Ceballo	Nounours du Moulin	Venezuela	56.90	0	0	0	56.90
6	Rebecca Howard	Roquefort	Canada	51.30	3.60	8.00	0	62.90
7	James Atkinson	Gustav	Canada	53.70	8.00	4.00	0	65.70
8	Rigoberto Aldana	Durango	Guatemala	67.40	3.60	0	0	71.00
9	Marcio Jorge	Josephine MCJ	Brazil	52.80	10.00	4.00	5.00	71.80
10	Carlos Lobos	Ranco	Chile	59.80	12.80	0	0	72.60
11	Sergio Iturriaga	Lago Rupanco	Chile	59.60	12.40	4.00	0	76.00
12	Jesper Martendal	Laid Jimmy	Brazil	65.20	0	16.00	0	81.20
13	Federico Valdez Diez	Remonta Lima	Argentina	65.00	12.80	0	4.00	81.80
14	Marcelo Rawson	King's Elf	Argentina	65.90	11.60	0	7.00	84.50
15	Jose Ortelli	Jos Aladar	Argentina	57.40	4.80	12.00	17.00	91.20
16	Erik Arambula	Monterrey	Mexico	60.90	10.00	9.00	17.00	96.90
17	Federico Daners	SVR Ron	Uruguay	63.20	20.00	4.00	12.00	99.20
18	Marcelo Tosi	Eleda All Black	Brazil	59.50	34.80	0	5.00	99.30
19	Carlos Narvaez	Que Loco	Ecuador	62.40	20.80	8.00	15.00	106.20
20	Shannon Lilley	Ballingowan Pizazz	United States	49.30	0	0	—	—
21	Lynn Symansky	Donner	United States	52.20	0	0	—	—
22	Serguei Fofanoff	Donner	Brazil	59.80	2.00	0	—	—
23	Selena O'Hanlon	Foxwood High	Canada	52.20	20.00	7.00	—	—
24	Hawley Bennett	Five O'clock Somewhere	Canada	53.20	26.40	0	—	—
25	Rita Sanz-Agero	Remonta Imperdible	Guatemala	58.20	56.00	4.00	—	—
26	Gimena Fernandez	Lover Foss	Uruguay	67.80	59.20	7.00	—	—
27	Carlos Sueiras	Ines	Guatemala	77.80	105.60	0	—	—
28	Fernando Dominguez Silva	Almil Agresivo Z	Argentina	53.50	126.60	4.00	—	—
29	Mauricio Bermudez	Nankin	Colombia	73.50	123.20	12.00	—	—
	Ronald Zabala	Mr. Wiseguy	Ecuador	52.00	6.40	EL	—	—
	Carlos Cornejo	Prometeo Equus	Mexico	58.00	30.80	—	—	—
	Luis Gamboa	Henry	El Salvador	76.50	0	—	—	—
	Martin Bedoya Guido	Remonta Lanza	Argentina	65.20	1000.00	—	—	—
	Ruy Fonseca Filho	Tom Bombadill Too	Brazil	50.40	1000.00	—	—	—
	Felipe Martinez	Navideño	Chile	56.30	1000.00	—	—	—
	Ricardo Stangher	Halesco	Chile	62.60	1000.00	—	—	—
	Jose Ibañez	Amil Fuego	Chile	56.50	1000.00	—	—	—
	Juan Tafur	Quinnto	Colombia	68.20	1000.00	—	—	—
	Alexander Lopez	Nilo	Colombia	74.30	1000.00	—	—	—
	Wilson Zarabanda	Victoriosa	Colombia	69.30	60.00	—	—	—
	Gonzalo Meza	Kosovo	Ecuador	63.00	1000.00	—	—	—
	Tiziana Billy	Shandon	Guatemala	63.30	1000.00	—	—	—
	Juan Pivaral	VDL Tommy	Guatemala	58.00	1000.00	—	—	—
	Gregorio Martinez	Noblesa	Mexico	65.70	1000.00	—	—	—
	Abraham Ojeda	Obusero	Mexico	58.90	1000.00	—	—	—
	Lauren Billys	Ballingowan Ginger	Puerto Rico	50.60	—	—	—	—
	Francisco Martinez	Ser Unico	Venezuela	66.70	1000.00	—	—	—
	Novis Borges	Ritual	Venezuela	65.00	1000.00	—	—	—
	Carlos Silva	T Start	Venezuela	71.70	1000.00	—	—	—
