= Van Springel =

Van Springel is a surname. Notable people with the surname include:

- Herman Van Springel (1943–2022), Belgian cyclist
- Joris Vanspringel (born 1963), Belgian equestrian
