= Champions Challenge =

Champions Challenge might refer to two different field hockey tournaments organized by the International Hockey Federation (FIH):

- Hockey Champions Challenge I: introduced in 2001 as Hockey Champions Challenge, its name changed in 2009 to the current one.
- Hockey Champions Challenge II: introduced in 2009.
