= Guillermo Schickendantz =

Argentine field hockey player (born 1979)

Willy Schickendantz
Personal information
- Full name: Guillermo Schickendantz
- Born: 22 June 1979 (age 47) Córdoba, Argentina

Sport
- Sport: Field hockey
- Position: Forward
Senior career
Years	Team	Caps	Goals
–	Córdoba	-	-
2003–2007	Taburiente	-	-
2007–2009	Club Egara	-	-
2009–2011	Club de Campo	-	-
2011–2012	Antwerp	-	-
–	Córdoba	-	-
National team
Years	Team	Caps	Goals
2012–2014	Argentina	49	-
Medal record
Men's field hockey
Representing Argentina
World Cup
Bronze medal – third place	2014 The Hague
Pan American Cup
Gold medal – first place	2013 Brampton
South American Games
Gold medal – first place	2014 Santiago	Team
South American Championship
Gold medal – first place	2014 Santiago

Guillermo Schickendantz is an Argentine field hockey player. He made his debut for the national team at the 2012 Men's Hockey Champions Challenge I, at the age of 33.
