= Bandon Grammar School =

Private secondary school in Bandon, County Cork, Ireland

- Scoil Ghramadaí Dhroichead na Bandan

Location
- Clancool More; Bandon, County Cork; Ireland; 51.7337°N 8.7480°W

Information
- Type: Private Boarding and Day
- Motto: Cavendo Tutus
- Religious affiliation: Church of Ireland
- Established: 1642; 384 years ago
- Head teacher: Niamh McShane
- Chaplain: Rev Anne Skuse
- Age: 12 to 19
- Color
- Sports: Rugby; Hockey; Basketball; Sailing
- Publication: Annual School Review
- Annual tuition: Day Pupils - € 5,090; 5-Day Boarders - €12,412; 7-Day Boarders - €20.502
- Website: bandongrammar.ie

Bandon Grammar School (Scoil Ghrammadaí Dhroichead na Bandan) is a Church of Ireland secondary school situated in Bandon, County Cork, Ireland. Established in 1642, it is one of the oldest schools in Ireland.

== General ==
Bandon Grammar School is a co-educational, boarding and day school founded in 1642, with an historic association with the Church of Ireland. It is managed by a local Board of Directors under the auspices of The Incorporated Society as patron and held from that body under a Lease "as a secondary school recognised as such by the Minister for Education under the rules of the Department of Education for secondary schools, primarily for Protestant pupils".

== History ==
Bandon Grammar School was founded in 1642 by Richard Boyle, 1st Earl of Cork.

== Sport ==
=== Field hockey ===
With a team that included future Ireland men's field hockey internationals, David and Conor Harte, Bandon Grammar School won the 2005 All Ireland Schoolboys Hockey Championship and also repeated the success in the COVID-19 delayed 2021–22 season. They also won a second place medal in the minor all Ireland hockey John warren tournament in 2026.

=== Rugby ===
Bandon Grammar School competes in the Munster Schools 'A' competitions. Notable past players include Darren Sweetnam, James French, Gavin Coombes, and Jack Crowley. Régis Sonnes spent two years coaching at the school, alongside coaching at Bandon R.F.C. before returning to top 14 rugby, taking Stade Toulousain to be the 2018 French Champions. He has since returned to Bandon and continues to coach at Bandon Grammar and Bandon R.F.C. Fiona Hayes currently coaches girls rugby at the school.

== Notable past students ==
- Jack Crowley, Ireland and Munster Rugby fly-half
- Gavin Coombes, Ireland and Munster Rugby player
- Harriet Cross, Conservative Party Member of House of Commons in 2024
- Conor Harte, Ireland field hockey international
- David Harte, Ireland field hockey international
- Graham Norton, TV chat show host and actor; finished his Leaving Certificate in 1981
- Lennox Robinson, playwright and director
- Darren Sweetnam, Ireland and Munster Rugby player and former Cork senior hurler
