= Ashton School =

Location
- Cork; Ireland
- Coordinates: 51.893°N 8.452°W

Information
- Other name: Ashton Comprehensive School
- Former name: Cork Grammar School, Rochelle School
- School type: Secondary school
- Religious affiliation: Church of Ireland
- Established: 1829; 197 years ago (as Rochelle School; girls); 1881 (as Cork Grammar; boys); 1972 (as Ashton School; merger)
- Patronage: Church of Ireland Bishop of Cork, Cork Education and Training Board
- Gender: Mixed
- Enrollment: 517 (2017)
- Website: ashton.ie
- Last updated: 24 May 2021

Ashton School is a co-educational Church of Ireland secondary school situated in Cork, Ireland. It was founded in 1972, following the merger of the Cork Grammar School and Rochelle School. As of 2017, Ashton School had over 500 pupils.

== Formation ==
Cork Grammar School was a Church of Ireland grammar school for boys. Founded in 1881, it was originally based in Sydney Place in Cork city, and intended to offer an alternative to parents "who had been sending their children to England, to educate them". The school ultimately acquired Ashton House (a large 19th-century house on the Blackrock Road) and moved to the new site in 1956.

Rochelle School was a predominantly Church of Ireland preparatory school for girls. Founded in 1829, it was originally based at Cook Street and South Terrace, before moving to Rochelle House (a large house also on the road to Blackrock) in 1863.

Cork Grammar School (boys; 1880s-1970s) and Rochelle School (girls; 1820s-1970s) operated as separate schools until 1972, when they merged. The newly amalgamated co-educational school occupied the Ashton House site, from which its current name was taken. Rochelle House was used for boarding accommodation for a period, before being sold in 1999.

Between 2013 and 2015, additional facilities were developed at the school, and the original Georgian-era building was refurbished.

== Alumni ==
Alumni of Ashton (and, prior to their merger, of Cork Grammar School and Rochelle School) have included:

- Herbert Cassidy, Dean of Armagh
- Paul Colton, academic in law and Bishop of Cork, Cloyne and Ross
- Mary Elmes, humanitarian activist
- Ken Good, Bishop of Derry and Raphoe
- Peter Foott, film director, producer and screenwriter
- Robert Hilliard, boxer for Ireland at the 1924 Olympics, minister at St Anne's Cathedral, Belfast, and volunteer during the Spanish Civil War
- John Jermyn, Ireland field hockey international who represented Ireland at the 2016 Summer Olympics
- Henry McAdoo, Archbishop of Dublin
- Noel Moffett, architect and educator
- Pat O'Hara, former flanker for the Ireland national rugby union team.
- Éanna Hardwicke, actor (The Sixth Commandment, Normal People)
