= Camilla Kruger =

Zimbabwean equestrian (born 1986)

Personal information
- Born: 19 September 1986 (age 38)

Camilla Kruger (born 19 September 1986) is a Zimbabwean Olympic eventing rider. She competed at the 2016 Summer Olympics in Rio de Janeiro where she placed 35th in the individual competition.

Kruger became the first Zimbabwean equestrian rider to compete at the Olympics.

== CCI 4* Results ==
Results
Event	Kentucky	Badminton	Luhmühlen	Burghley	Pau	Adelaide
2017			RET (Biarritz)			
EL = Eliminated; RET = Retired; WD = Withdrew
