= 2011 Men's Hockey Champions Challenge II =

Hockey competition held in 2011 France

Tournament details
- Host country: France
- City: Lille
- Dates: 2–10 July
- Teams: 8 (from 3 confederations)
- Venue: Lille Métropole Hockey Club

Final positions
- Champions: Ireland (1st title)
- Runner-up: France
- Third place: Russia

Tournament statistics
- Matches played: 24
- Goals scored: 130 (5.42 per match)
- Top scorer: (Czech Republic) Tomáš Procházka (6 goals)
- Best goalkeeper: (Ireland) David Harte

The 2011 Men's Hockey Champions Challenge II was the second and final edition of the Champions Challenge II. It was held at the Lille Métropole Hockey Club in Lille, France, from 2 to 10 July 2011.

Ireland won the tournament, defeating hosts France 4–2 in the final. With the win, Ireland gained promotion to the 2012 Champions Challenge I in Quilmes.

== Teams ==
Eight teams participated in the tournament, they were:

- Austria
- China
- Czech Republic
- France
- Ireland
- Russia
- Scotland
- United States

== Results ==
All times are Central European Summer Time (UTC+02:00)

=== First round ===
==== Pool A ====
Pos	Team	Pld	W	D	L	GF	GA	GD	Pts	Qualification
1	China	3	2	1	0	6	2	+4	7	Quarter-finals
2	Czech Republic	3	1	1	1	7	7	0	4	Quarter-finals
3	Austria	3	1	0	2	5	6	−1	3	Quarter-finals
4	United States	3	1	0	2	3	6	−3	3	Quarter-finals

Source: FIH
Rules for classification: 1) points; 2) goal difference; 3) goals scored; 4) head-to-head result.

2 July 2011
11:00

China	2–1	Austria
Dong 21'; Liu Y. 57'	Report	Körper 54'

Umpires:
Javed Shaikh (IND)
David Sweetman (SCO)

2 July 2011
13:00

United States	2–3	Czech Republic
Holt 8'; Harris 21'	Report	Procházka 11'; Bernátek 42', 44'

Umpires:
Geoff Conn (IRL)
Hichem Azaiez (FRA)

3 July 2011
11:00

Austria	4–3	Czech Republic
Körper 16'; Bele 46', 67'; Jelinek 63'	Report	Vacek 8', 62'; Procházka 70'

Umpires:
Andrey Isaev (RUS)
Geoff Conn (IRL)

3 July 2011
13:00

United States	0–3	China
	Report	Na 38'; Liu X. 57'; E 64'

Umpires:
Gaetan Dubval (FRA)
Marcin Grochal (POL)

5 July 2011
11:00

China	1–1	Czech Republic
Sun 27'	Report	Procházka 53'

Umpires:
Hichem Azaiez (FRA)
David Sweetman (SCO)

5 July 2011
13:00

Austria	0–1	United States
	Report	Harris 44'

Umpires:
Andrey Isaev (RUS)
Geoff Conn (IRL)

==== Pool B ====
Pos	Team	Pld	W	D	L	GF	GA	GD	Pts	Qualification
1	Ireland	3	2	1	0	9	4	+5	7	Quarter-finals
2	France (H)	3	2	1	0	10	8	+2	7	Quarter-finals
3	Russia	3	1	0	2	8	11	−3	3	Quarter-finals
4	Scotland	3	0	0	3	6	10	−4	0	Quarter-finals

Source: FIH
Rules for classification: 1) points; 2) goal difference; 3) goals scored; 4) head-to-head result.
(H) Hosts

2 July 2011
15:00

Ireland	3–2	Scotland
Giles 17'; McCabe 20'; C. Harte 38'	Report	Byers 58'; Forsyth 60'

Umpires:
Marcin Grochal (POL)
Jakub Mejzlik (CZE)

2 July 2011
17:00

France	5–4	Russia
Magner 5', 47'; Schambert 34'; Pauchet 48'; Sanchez 51'	Report	Zakirov 12', 65'; Golubev 19'; Platonov 27'

Umpires:
Michael Eilmer (AUT)
You Suolong (CHN)

3 July 2011
15:00

Russia	4–2	Scotland
Golubev 22'; Platonov 36'; Komarov 52'; Azarov 65'	Report	Christie 43'; Forsyth 44'

Umpires:
Jakub Mejzlik (CZE)
Michael Eilmer (AUT)

3 July 2011
17:00

Ireland	2–2	France
Watkins 17'; Magee 70+'	Report	Catonnet 34', 35+'

Umpires:
Javed Shaikh (IND)
You Suolong (CHN)

5 July 2011
15:00

Russia	0–4	Ireland
	Report	Watt 7'; Cargo 25'; Magee 44'; Blakeney 63'

Umpires:
Marcin Grochal (POL)
You Suolong (CHN)

5 July 2011
17:00

France	3–2	Scotland
Pauchet 39'; Sevestre 49'; Catonnet 55'	Report	Dunn 32'; Coultas 58'

Umpires:
Javed Shaikh (IND)
Michael Eilmar (AUT)

=== Second round ===
==== Bracket ====
Quarter-finals
7 July
China	1
Scotland	2
7 July
France (pen.)	2 (3)
Austria	2 (2)
7 July
Czech Republic	1
Russia	9
7 July
Ireland	6
United States	2

Semi-finals
9 July
Scotland	3
France	5
9 July
Russia	2
Ireland	9

Final
10 July
France	2
Ireland	4
Third place
10 July
Scotland	1
Russia	3

==== Quarter-finals ====
7 July 2011
10:00

China	1–2	Scotland
Liu Y. 8'	Report	Coultas 10'; Marshall 42'

Umpires:
Javed Shaikh (IND)
Hichem Azaiez (FRA)

7 July 2011
12:30

France	2–2 (a.e.t.)	Austria
Sevestre 28'; Becuwe 67'	Report	Grandits 6'; Bele 49'
Penalties
Migneau (penalty shoot-out missed); Catonnet (penalty shoot-out scored); Sanchez (penalty shoot-out missed); Pauchet (penalty shoot-out scored); T. Genestet	3–2	(penalty shoot-out missed) Minar; (penalty shoot-out scored) Eitenberger; (penalty shoot-out scored) Grandits; (penalty shoot-out missed) Wellan; (penalty shoot-out missed) Körper

Umpires:
Jakub Mejzlik (CZE)
Geoff Conn (IRL)

7 July 2011
15:00

Czech Republic	1–9	Russia
Procházka 15'	Report	Platonov 3', 40'; Zhirkov 4'; Komarov 41', 57'; Zakirov 43'; Larikov 52'; Golubev 64'; Yankun 70+'

Umpires:
David Sweetman (SCO)
You Suolong (CHN)

7 July 2011
17:30

Ireland	6–2	United States
C. Harte 4'; Watkins 35'; Brennan 44'; Caruth 45', 62'; Cargo 51'	Report	Sundeen 53'; Harris 56'

Umpires:
Marcin Grochal (POL)
Michael Eilmer (AUT)

==== Fifth to eighth place classification ====
Cross-overs
9 July
China	3
Austria	2
9 July
Czech Republic	2
United States	1

Fifth place
10 July
China	3
Czech Republic	4
Seventh place
10 July
Austria	2
United States	5

===== Cross-overs =====
9 July 2011
09:00

China	3–2	Austria
Na 6', 24'; Sun 64'	Report	Grandits 16'; Gerö 58'

Umpires:
David Sweetman (SCO)
Jakub Mejslik (CZE)

9 July 2011
11:30

Czech Republic	2–1	United States
Kyndl 60', 70'	Report	Barber 70'

Umpires:
Geoff Conn (IRL)
Hichem Azaiez (FRA)

===== Seventh and eighth place =====
10 July 2011
09:30

Austria	2–5	United States
Körper 10'; Jelinek 63'	Report	Dijxhoorn 25'; Holt 43', 44'; Ginolfi 53'; Harris 67'

Umpires:
Gaetan Duval (FRA)
You Suolong (CHN)

===== Fifth and sixth place =====
10 July 2011
12:00

China	3–4	Czech Republic
Liu X. 1'; Liu Y. 14', 34'	Report	Kyndl 3'; Bernártek 35'; Procházka 63', 65'

Umpires:
Brian Jones (USA)
Martin Canniffe (IRL)

==== First to fourth place classification ====
===== Semifinals =====
9 July 2011
14:00

Scotland	3–5	France
Dunn 23'; Coultas 42'; Christie 63'	Report	Sanchez 34'; Magner 35+', 45'; Sevestre 48'; Pauchet 54'

Umpires:
Marcin Grochal (POL)
You Suolong (CHN)

9 July 2011
16:30

Russia	2–9	Ireland
Komarov 21', 68'	Report	Magee 11'; C. Harte 15', 26', 38'; Caruth 23'; Blakeney 28'; Watt 47'; McCabe 55'; Watkins 57'

Umpires:
Javed Shaikh (IND)
Michael Eilmer (AUT)

===== Third and fourth place =====
10 July 2011
14:30

Scotland	1–3	Russia
Byers 19'	Report	Mamoshkin 62'; Golubev 68'; Kornilov 70'

Umpires:
Javed Shaikh (IND)
Hichem Azaiez (FRA)

===== Final =====
10 July 2011
17:00

France	2–4	Ireland
Catonnet 35'; Pauchet 50'	Report	Gormley 17'; Magee 30'; McConnell 49'; Watkins 55'

Umpires:
Marcin Grochal (POL)
Michael Eilmer (AUT)

== Awards ==
Top scorer	Goalkeeper of the Tournament
(Czech Republic) Tomáš Procházka	(Ireland) David Harte

== Final rankings ==
Pos	Team	Pld	W	D	L	GF	GA	GD	Pts	Qualification
1st place, gold medalist(s)	Ireland	6	5	1	0	28	10	+18	16	Qualified for 2012 Champions Challenge I
2nd place, silver medalist(s)	France (H)	6	3	2	1	19	17	+2	11	
3rd place, bronze medalist(s)	Russia	6	3	0	3	22	22	0	9	
4	Scotland	6	1	0	5	12	19	−7	3	
5	Czech Republic	6	3	1	2	14	20	−6	10	
6	China	6	3	1	2	13	10	+3	10	
7	United States	6	2	0	4	11	16	−5	6	
8	Austria	6	1	1	4	11	16	−5	4	

Source: FIH
(H) Hosts

== Goalscorers ==
There were 130 goals scored in 24 matches, for an average of 5.42 goals per match.

6 goals

- (Czech Republic) Tomáš Procházka

5 goals

- (Ireland) Conor Harte
- (Russia) Nikolay Komarov

4 goals

- (China) Liu Yixian
- (France) Matthieu Catonnet
- (France) Fabien Magner
- (France) Jean-Baptiste Pauchet
- (Ireland) Eugene Magee
- (Ireland) Gareth Watkins
- (Russia) Pavel Golubev
- (Russia) Aleksandr Platonov
- (United States) Patrick Harris

3 goals

- (Austria) Alexander Bele
- (Austria) Michael Körper
- (China) Na Yubo
- (Czech Republic) Štĕpán Bernátek
- (Czech Republic) Jakub Kyndl
- (France) Lucas Sevestre
- (Ireland) Peter Caruth
- (Russia) Ravshanzhon Zakirov
- (Scotland) Daniel Coultas
- (United States) William Holt

2 goals

- (Austria) Manuel Grandits
- (Austria) Jelinek Jelinek
- (China) Liu Xiantang
- (China) Sun Long
- (Czech Republic) David Vacek
- (France) Olivier Sanchez
- (Ireland) Peter Blakeney
- (Ireland) Christopher Cargo
- (Ireland) William McCabe
- (Ireland) Michael Watt
- (Scotland) Gavin Byers
- (Scotland) Michael Christie
- (Scotland) Fergus Dunn
- (Scotland) Alan Forsyth

1 goal

- (Austria) Matthias Gerö
- (China) Dong Yang
- (China) E Liguang
- (France) Arnaud Becuwe
- (France) Yannick Schambert
- (Ireland) Joseph Brennan
- (Ireland) Alan Giles
- (Ireland) Ronan Gormley
- (Ireland) Andrew McConnell
- (Russia) Dmitry Azarov
- (Russia) Alexey Kornilov
- (Russia) Ilya Larikov
- (Russia) Anton Mamoshkin
- (Russia) Nikolay Yankun
- (Russia) Alexander Zhirkov
- (Scotland) William Marshall
- (United States) Kevin Barber
- (United States) Michiel Dijxhoorn
- (United States) Jon Ginolfi
- (United States) Tyler Sundeen
