= John Jermyn (field hockey) =

Irish field hockey player (born 1982)

Personal information
- Full name: John Jermyn
- Born: 30 March 1982 (age 44) County Cork, Ireland
- Height: 186 cm (6 ft 1 in)
- Weight: 80 kg (176 lb)

Sport
- Sport: Field hockey
- Position: Midfielder
Youth career
- Years: Team
- 1996–2001: Ashton School
Senior career
Years	Team	Caps	Goals
199x–2018	Cork Church of Ireland	-	-
2007–2008	→ HGC	-	-
2012–2013	→ Royal Pingouin	-	-
20xx–20xx	→ Pembroke Wanderers	-	-
National team
Years	Team	Caps	Goals
2002–2018	Ireland	179	(93)

John Jermyn (born 30 March 1982) is a former Ireland men's field hockey international. Between 2002 and 2018 Jermyn made 179 appearances and scored 93 goals for Ireland. He represented Ireland at the 2007 and 2011 Men's EuroHockey Nations Championships and at the 2016 Summer Olympics. In 2012, Jermyn set the new record as career top goal scorer for Ireland, eventually increasing the record to 93 goals by the end of his career with the national team; his record was not broken until 2018.

== Early years and education ==
Jermyn completed his elementary educated at St Luke's National School in Douglas, Cork. Between 1996 and 2001 he attended Ashton School. Between 2005 and 2008 he attended University College Cork where he gained a BA in Economics and Geography. He also gained diplomas from the Law Society of Ireland in Employment Law and Legal Studies.

== Domestic teams ==
=== Ashton School ===
Between 1997 and 2000 Jermyn was a member of the Ashton School team that played in four successive All Ireland Schoolboys Hockey Championship finals. He finished on the winning teams in both 1998 and 2000.

=== Cork Church of Ireland ===
In 1998–99 Jermyn was a member of the Cork Church of Ireland team that won the Irish Senior Cup. He was also a member of the Cork Church of Ireland team that played in the 2014–15 final, losing 2–1 after extra time to Banbridge. In 2015–16 Jermyn scored eleven goals, including three hat-tricks, for Cork Church of Ireland in the Men's Irish Hockey League. This led to him gaining a recall into the Ireland team for the 2016 Summer Olympics. In April 2017 Jermyn was awarded an honorary life membership by the Cork Church of Ireland club. As of 2018–19 he was still playing for the club in the Men's Irish Hockey League.

=== HGC ===
The 2007–08 season saw Jermyn play for HGC in the Hoofdklasse. Together with Iain Lewers, Eugene Magee and Barry Middleton, he was a member of the HGC team that finished as runners-up in the 2007–08 Euro Hockey League.

=== Royal Pingouin ===
The 2012–13 season saw Jermyn play for Royal Pingouin in the Men's Belgian Hockey League. The club agreed fly him to Belgium on weekends for matches only, allowing him to continue his career as a solicitor in Cork.

== Ireland international ==
Jermyn represented Ireland at Under-16, Under-18 and Under-21 levels before making his senior debut. Between 2002 and 2018 Jermyn made 179 appearances and scored 93 goals for Ireland. He made his senior debut against Belgium in June 2002. Shortly after he scored his first goal for Ireland against Scotland. Jermyn was a member of the Ireland team that won the 2009 Men's EuroHockey Nations Trophy. In October 2009 he scored his 50th goal for Ireland against Scotland. In February 2010 he captained Ireland for the first time in a game against Scotland. Jermyn was also a member of the Ireland team that won a 2012–13 Men's FIH Hockey World League Round 1 tournament; on 7 September 2012, in an opening pool game against Wales, scored a goal that tied him with Stephen Butler as Ireland's all-time leading goal scorer, breaking the record the next night when he scored his 80th all-time in a game against Austria. He made his 150th appearance for Ireland at the 2012 Men's Hockey Champions Challenge I tournament. Between December 2012 and March 2016, Jermyn was effectively retired from the Ireland team. However his performances for Cork Church of Ireland in the Men's Irish Hockey League saw him recalled to the national team and he subsequently represented Ireland at the 2016 Summer Olympics. In June 2018, Jermyn scored his final goal, his 93rd all time for Ireland, in a 1–1 draw against France.

From September 2012 to December 2018, Jermyn held – and steadily increased – the record for goals scored with the Irish national team, retiring from international competition with 93 goals; he was surpassed on 7 December 2018 by Shane O'Donoghue, who scored his 94th goal in a first round match against England at the 2018 Men's Hockey World Cup.

Tournaments	Place
2001 Men's Hockey Junior World Cup	14th
2006 Men's Intercontinental Cup	8th
2007 Men's EuroHockey Nations Championship	7th
2008 Men's Field Hockey Olympic Qualifier	4th
2009 Men's Hockey Champions Challenge II	2nd
2009 Men's EuroHockey Nations Trophy	1st
2009 Men's Hockey World Cup Qualifiers	3rd
2011 Men's EuroHockey Nations Championship	5th
2012 Men's Field Hockey Olympic Qualifier	2nd
2012–13 Men's FIH Hockey World League Round 1	1st
2012 Men's Hockey Champions Challenge I	3rd
2016 Summer Olympics	10th

== Personal life ==
Since May 2011 Jermyn has worked as a solicitor for Ronan, Daly, Jermyn Solicitors. Jermyn is also actively involved in the Church of Ireland. In March 2018 he was appointed assistant diocesan registrar by the Bishop of Cork, Cloyne and Ross, Paul Colton. His father, grandfather and great–grandfather have all previously held the same office.

== Honours ==
Ireland

- Men's EuroHockey Nations Trophy
  - Winners: 2009
- Men's FIH Hockey World League Round 1
  - Winners: 2012 Cardiff
- Men's Hockey Champions Challenge II
  - Runners up: 2009
- Men's Field Hockey Olympic Qualifier
  - Runners up: 2012

HGC

- Euro Hockey League
  - Runners up: 2007–08

Cork Church of Ireland

- Irish Senior Cup
  - Winners: 1998–99: 1
  - Runners up: 2014–15: 1

Ashton School

- All Ireland Schoolboys Hockey Championship
  - Winners: 1998, 2000: 2
  - Runners up: 1997, 1999: 2
