= Lauren Shady =

American athlete

Personal information
- Born: May 14, 1988 (age 38) Visalia, California
Medal record
Equestrian
Representing Puerto Rico
Central American and Caribbean Games
Gold medal – first place	2023 Santo Domingo	Individual eventing

Lauren Shady (née Billys, born 14 May 1988) is an American-born eventer who represents Puerto Rico. She competed at the 2016 Summer Olympics in Rio de Janeiro, where she finished 44th in the individual competition. In doing so, Billys became the first Puerto Rican eventer to compete at the Olympics since 1988. She was eligible to represent Puerto Rico in the event because her grandmother is Puerto Rican.

Billys competed at her second Olympics in 2021, once again riding Castle Larchfield Purdy, but failed to complete the event.

Billys also competed at two Pan American Games (in 2011 and 2015). Her best result came in 2015, when she achieved 18th place.

== International championships results ==
Results
Year	Event	Horse	Placing	Notes
2011	Pan American Games	Ballingowan Ginger	EL	Individual
2015	Pan American Games	Castle Larchfield Purdy	18th	Individual
2016	Olympic Games	Castle Larchfield Purdy	44th	Individual
2021	Olympic Games	Castle Larchfield Purdy	EL	Individual
EL = Eliminated; RET = Retired; WD = Withdrew
