= 2012 Men's Hockey Champions Challenge I =

Field hockey tournament

2012 Men's Champions Challenge I

Tournament details
- Host country: Argentina
- City: Quilmes
- Teams: 8
- Venue: Estadio Nacional de Hockey

Final positions
- Champions: Argentina (3rd title)
- Runner-up: South Korea
- Third place: Ireland

Tournament statistics
- Matches played: 24
- Goals scored: 128 (5.33 per match)
- Top scorer: (South Korea) Jang Jong-Hyun (8 goals)
- Best player: (Argentina) Lucas Vila

The 2012 Men's Hockey Champions Challenge was held from 24 November to 2 December 2012 in Quilmes, Argentina. The tournament doubled as the qualifier to the 2014 Men's Hockey Champions Trophy to be held in India as the winner earned an automatic berth to compete.

This was the seventh edition of the competition initiated by the International Hockey Federation in 2001 to broaden hockey's competitive base globally and featured the 8 teams just behind the top six teams in the world.

Argentina won the tournament for the third time after defeating Korea 5–0 in the final, earning an automatic berth at the 2014 Men's Hockey Champions Trophy after their absence in the previous four editions.

== Qualification ==
The following eight teams announced by the FIH competed in this tournament.

- Argentina (Host nation)
- South Korea (Eighth in 2011 Champions Trophy)
- Ireland (Winners of 2011 Champions Challenge II)
- South Africa (Third in 2011 Champions Challenge I)
- Malaysia (Fifth in 2011 Champions Challenge I)
- Poland (Sixth in 2011 Champions Challenge I)
- Japan (Seventh in 2011 Champions Challenge I)
- Canada (Eighth in 2011 Champions Challenge I)

== Umpires ==
Below are the 10 umpires appointed by the International Hockey Federation:

- (Republic of Ireland) Geoff Conn
- (Austria) Michael Eilmer
- (Argentina) Fernando Gómez
- (Australia) Adam Kearns
- (Japan) Satoshi Kondo
- (Spain) Eduardo Lizana
- (India) Javed Shaikh
- (South Africa) Aiden Shrives
- (Belgium) Gregory Uyttenhove
- (China) You Suolong

== Results ==
All times are Argentine Time (UTC−03:00)

=== First round ===
==== Pool A ====
Team	Pld	W	D	L	GF	GA	GD	Pts
Malaysia	3	3	0	0	12	4	+8	9
Poland	3	1	1	1	8	11	−3	4
South Korea	3	1	0	2	8	9	–1	3
Canada	3	0	1	2	5	9	−4	1

24 November 2012
10:00

South Korea	2 – 0	Canada
Jang Jong-Hyun 31', 51'	Report

Umpires:
Geoff Conn (IRL)
Fernando Gómez (ARG)

24 November 2012
12:30

Malaysia	4 – 0	Poland
Razie 4', 63'; Nabil 30'; 42'	Report

Umpires:
Eduardo Lizana (ESP)
Ayden Shrives (RSA)

25 November 2012
10:00

Canada	3 – 3	Poland
Singh 30'; Stewart 37'; Ho-Garcia 54'	Report	Juszczak 3'; Lewartowski 56', 59'

Umpires:
Javed Shaikh (IND)
You Suolong (CHN)

25 November 2012
12:30

Malaysia	4 – 2	South Korea
Razie 18'; Tengku 30', 31'; Chua 48'	Report	Jang Jong-Hyun 8', 61'

Umpires:
Geoff Conn (IRL)
Satoshi Kondo (JPN)

27 November 2012
08:30

South Korea	4 – 5	Poland
You Hyo-Sik 2'; Jang Jong-Hyun 33', 63'; Hyun Hye-Sung 64'	Report	Hutek 26'; 40'; Rachwalski 42'; Juszczak 45'; Górny 58'

Umpires:
Fernando Gómez (ARG)
Javed Shaikh (IND)

27 November 2012
11:00

Canada	2 – 4	Malaysia
Pereira 17'; Guest 39'	Report	Razie 7'; Tengku 11'; Faizal 24'; Fitri 56'

Umpires:
Geoff Conn (IRL)
Ayden Shrives (RSA)

==== Pool B ====
Team	Pld	W	D	L	GF	GA	GD	Pts
Argentina	3	3	0	0	10	5	+5	9
Japan	3	1	1	1	8	8	0	4
Ireland	3	1	0	2	6	8	−2	3
South Africa	3	0	1	2	6	9	−2	1

24 November 2012
15:00

South Africa	4 – 4	Japan
Glutz 22'; Norris-Jones 32'; Gonsalves 39'; Malgraff 42'	Report	Tachibana 2', 51'; Tsubouchi 47'; Nagasawa 65'

Umpires:
Javed Shaikh (IND)
Gregory Uyttenhove (BEL)

24 November 2012
17:30

Argentina	4 – 3	Ireland
Peillat 30', 41'; L. Vila 34', 67'	Report	Jermyn 23'; Cockram 27'; Watt 70'

Umpires:
Michael Eilmer (AUT)
Adam Kearns (AUS)

25 November 2012
15:00

Ireland	0 – 3	Japan
	Report	Tsubouchi 18'; Ono 53'; Kawauchi 64'

Umpires:
Michael Eilmer (AUT)
Adam Kearns (AUS)

25 November 2012
17:30

South Africa	1 – 2	Argentina
Guise-Brown 48'	Report	Peillat 10'; Schickendantz 56'

Umpires:
Eduardo Lizana (ESP)
Gregory Uyttenhove (BEL)

27 November 2012
13:30

Ireland	3 – 1	South Africa
McConnell 8'; Jermyn 42'; Harte 62'	Report	da Graca 13'

Umpires:
Satoshi Kondo (JPN)
Gregory Uyttenhove (BEL)

27 November 2012
16:00

Argentina	4 – 1	Japan
Schickendantz 14'; Peillat 32', 49'; M. Vila 67'	Report	Nagasawa 38'

Umpires:
Eduardo Lizana (ESP)
You Suolong (CHN)

=== Second round ===
Fifth place
Japan	4
Canada	2
Seventh place
South Africa	4
Poland	2

Consolation semifinals
South Africa	1
Japan	2
Poland	2
Canada	4

Quarterfinals
Malaysia	4
South Africa	1
Japan	2
South Korea	3
Poland	0
Ireland	4
Argentina	5
Canada	1

Semifinals
Malaysia	3
South Korea	6
Ireland	1
Argentina	2

Final
South Korea	0
Argentina	5
Third place
Malaysia	3
Ireland (a.e.t.)	4

==== Quarterfinals ====
29 November 2012
08:30

Malaysia	4 – 1	South Africa
Izwan 3'; Faizal 38', 57'; Tengku 56'	Report	Smith 63'

Umpires:
You Suolong (CHN)
Fernando Gómez (ARG)

29 November 2012
11:30

Japan	2 – 3	South Korea
Ono 32'; Kawakami 38'	Report	23'; Kang Moon-Kweon 50'; You Hyo-Sik 53'

Umpires:
Eduardo Lizana (ESP)
Michael Eilmer (AUT)

29 November 2012
14:30

Poland	0 – 4	Ireland
	Report	Watt 45'; Harte 50', 54'; O'Donoghue 63'

Umpires:
Ayden Shrives (RSA)
Gregory Uyttenhove (BEL)

29 November 2012
17:30

Argentina	5 – 1	Canada
L. Vila 2', 56'; Callioni 10'; Agulleiro 14'; Schickendantz 31'	Report	Tupper 42'

Umpires:
Javed Shaikh (IND)
Satoshi Kondo (JPN)

==== Fifth to eighth place classification ====
===== Crossover =====
1 December 2012
08:30

South Africa	1 – 2	Japan
Smith 2'	Report	Nagasawa 18'; Tachibana 43'

Umpires:
Gregory Uyttenhove (BEL)
You Suolong (CHN)

1 December 2012
11:30

Poland	2 – 4	Canada
Hulbój 10', 12'	Report	Singh 22'; Guest 28'; Tupper 58'; Pereira 62'

Umpires:
Ayden Shrives (RSA)
Eduardo Lizana (ESP)

===== Seventh and eighth place =====
2 December 2012
08:30

South Africa	4 – 2	Poland
Norris-Jones 7'; Guise-Brown 12'; Drummond 14'; Paton 65'	Report	Lewartowski 59'; Krokosz 67'

Umpires:
Satoshi Kondo (JPN)
Adam Kearns (AUS)

===== Fifth and sixth place =====
2 December 2012
11:00

Japan	4 – 2	Canada
Fukushiro 3'; Kawakami 15'; Tsubouchi 39'; Tachibana 41'	Report	Bissett 12'; Pearson 50'

Umpires:
Geoff Conn (IRL)
Fernando Gómez (ARG)

==== First to fourth place classification ====
===== Semifinals =====
1 December 2012
14:00

Malaysia	3 – 6	South Korea
Chua 48'; Razie 52'; Marham 65'	Report	Hyun Hye-sung 8', 27'; 32'; Lee Seung-il 33'; Jang Jong-hyun 50', 60'

Umpires:
Geoff Conn (IRL)
Michael Eilmer (AUT)

1 December 2012
17:00

Ireland	1 – 2	Argentina
Jermyn 66'	Report	Ibarra 38'; Schickendantz 45'

Umpires:
Adam Kearns (AUS)
Javed Shaikh (IND)

===== Third and fourth place =====
2 December 2012
14:00

Malaysia	3 – 4 (a.e.t.)	Ireland
Ismail 18'; Faizal 50'; Nabil 66'	Report	McCabe 3'; Harte 28', 68'; Caruth 80'

Umpires:
Ayden Shrives (RSA)
Javed Shaikh (IND)

===== Final =====
2 December 2012
17:00

South Korea	0 – 5	Argentina
	Report	Mazzilli 1'; Peillat 34'; Ibarra 37'; Schickendantz 52'; Brunet 57'

Umpires:
Gregory Uyttenhove (BEL)
Eduardo Lizana (ESP)

== Awards ==
Top Goalscorer	Player of the Tournament	Goalkeeper of the Tournament	Fair Play Trophy
(South Korea) Jang Jong-Hyun	(Argentina) Lucas Vila	(Ireland) David Harte	Japan

== Statistics ==
=== Final ranking ===
1. Argentina
2. South Korea
3. Ireland
4. Malaysia
5. Japan
6. Canada
7. South Africa
8. Poland
