= Ben Vogg =

Swiss equestrian

Personal information
- Born: 7 September 1992 (age 32)

Benjamin "Ben" Vogg (born 7 September 1992) is a Swiss Olympic eventing rider. He competed at the 2016 Summer Olympics in Rio de Janeiro where he finished 43rd in the individual competition.

Vogg also participated at the 2014 World Equestrian Games and at the 2015 European Eventing Championships. His best result came at the 2015 Europeans, when he achieved 7th place in the team eventing competition.

His grandfather Roland Perret competed at the 1956 Summer Olympics, while his brother Felix Vogg also competed at the 2016 Olympics.
