= Elmo Jankari =

Finnish equestrian

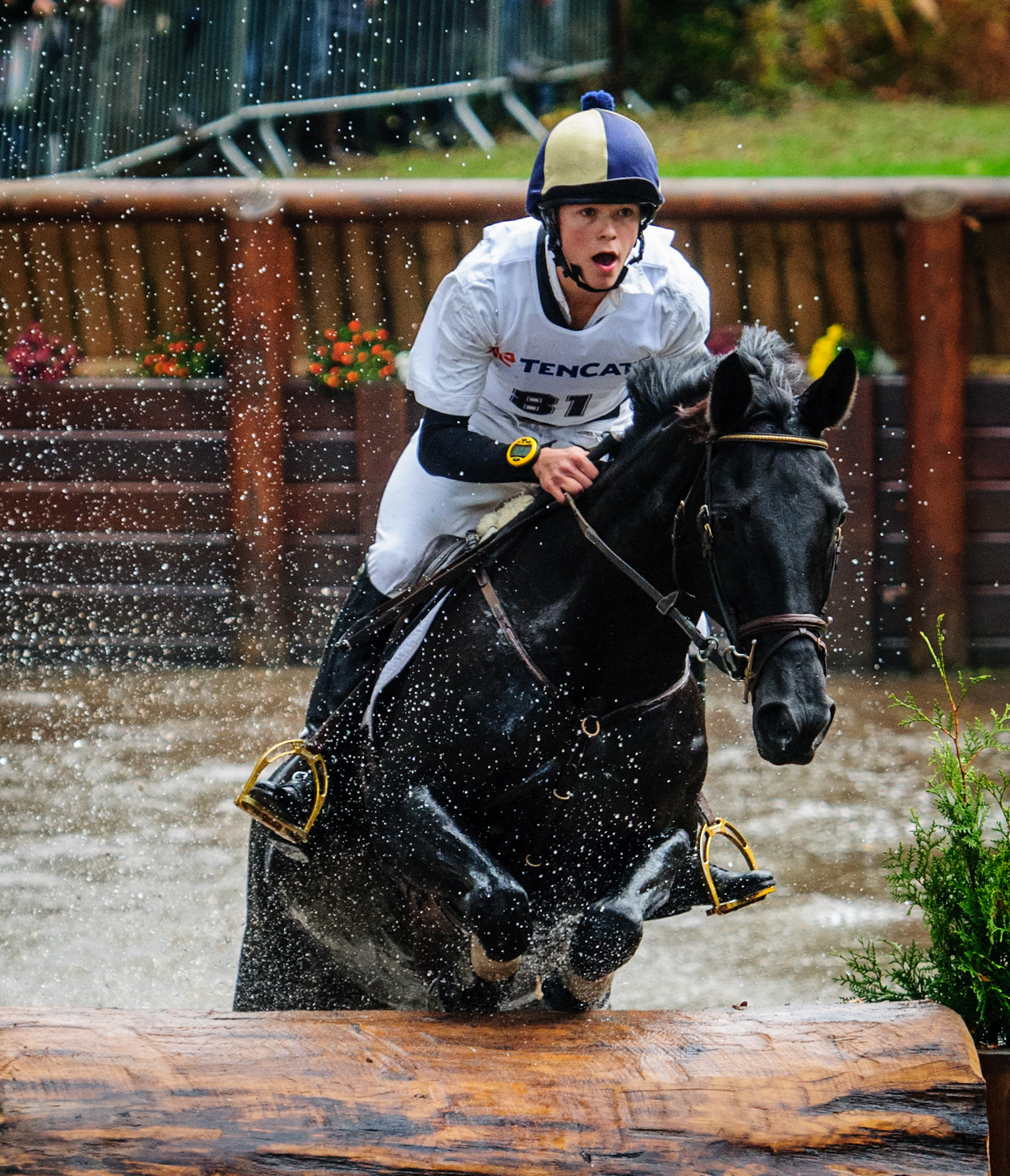
- Elmo Jankari (2013)

Personal information
- Born: 13 October 1992 (age 34) Turku, Finland

Elmo Jankari (born 13 October 1992 in Turku, Finland) is a Finnish Olympic eventing rider. He competed at the 2016 Summer Olympics in Rio de Janeiro where he finished 31st in the individual competition.

Jankari also participated at the 2014 World Equestrian Games and at the 2015 European Eventing Championships. His best result came at the 2015 Europeans, when he achieved 37th place in the individual eventing competition.
