= Joris Vanspringel =

Belgian equestrian

Personal information
- Born: 8 February 1963 (age 63) Turnhout, Belgium
Medal record
Equestrian
Representing Belgium
European Championships
Bronze medal – third place	2009 Fontainebleau	Team eventing

Joris Vanspringel (born 8 February 1963 in Turnhout, Belgium) is a Belgian Olympic eventing rider. Representing Belgium, he competed at four Summer Olympics (in 2004, 2008, 2012 and 2016). He placed 7th in team eventing in 2004. Meanwhile, his current best individual Olympic placement is 24th place from 2016.

Vanspringel also participated at the 2014 World Equestrian Games and at six European Eventing Championships (in 2003, 2007, 2009, 2011, 2013 and 2015). He won a team bronze at the 2009 Europeans held in Fontainebleau, France. His current best individual finish is 9th place from 2007.

In 2019, Vanspringel was banned for 9 months by the FEI for abusing a pony while teaching at a clinic in South Africa. The complaint against Vanspringel was lodged to the FEI by the South African Equestrian Federation after Vanspringel beat a 14-year-old child's pony leaving it with welts and marks after it refused to jump a fence. The FEI's extended suspension highlighted the aggravated circumstances as the behavior took place in front of a minor.

Joris Vanspringel is a full-time station master.

== CCI 4* results ==
Results
Event	Kentucky	Badminton	Luhmühlen	Burghley	Pau	Adelaide
2009		41st (Bold Action)				
2010	Did not participate					
2011		25th (Lully des Aulnes)				
2012	Did not participate					
2013		59th (Lully des Aulnes)	14th (Lully des Aulnes)			
2014-2016	Did not participate					
2017		24th (Lully des Aulnes)				
2018						
EL = Eliminated; RET = Retired; WD = Withdrew
