= Albert Hermoso Farras =

Spanish equestrian

Albert Hermoso
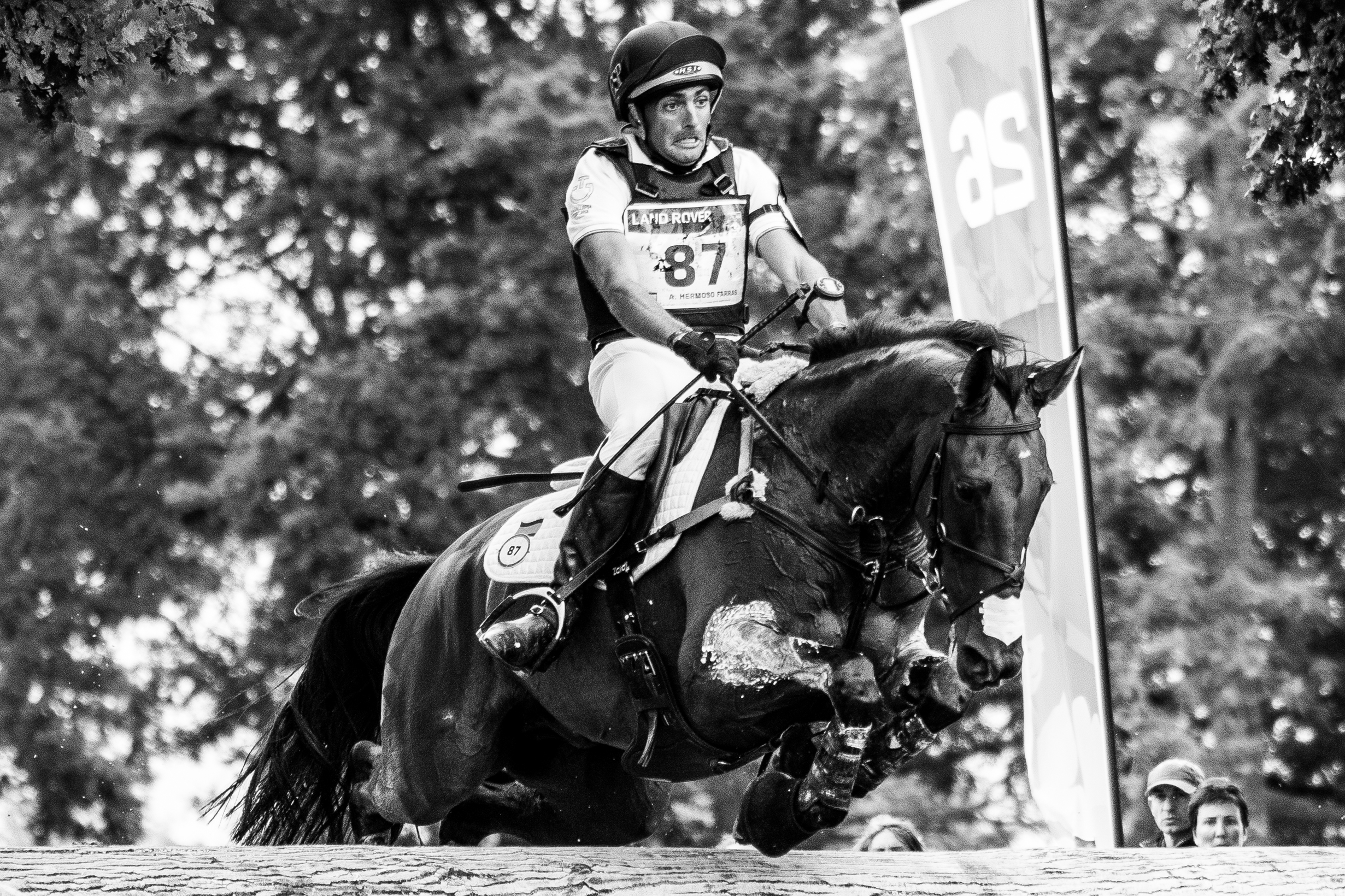
- Hermoso at the 2014 World Equestrian Games

Personal information
- Full name: Albert Hermoso Farras
- Born: 28 August 1978 (age 47)

Albert Hermoso Farras (born 28 August 1978) is a Spanish Olympic eventing rider. He competed at the 2016 Summer Olympics in Rio de Janeiro where he was eliminated during the cross-country stage of the individual eventing competition.

Hermoso Farras also participated at the 2014 World Equestrian Games and at four editions of European Eventing Championships (in 2009, 2011, 2013 and 2015). His best result is 8th place in team competition, which he achieved thrice, Hermoso also participated in Chile 2023, finishing in 5th place, making him one of the best in the Pan American Games. After winning the "Quilates" cup, he is taking a break and nothing is known about him for now.
