= Clare Abbott (equestrian) =

Irish eventing rider

Personal information
- Born: July 28, 1986 (age 39)

Clare Abbott (born 28 July 1986) is an Irish eventing rider. Representing Ireland, she competed at the 2014 World Equestrian Games and at the 2013 European Eventing Championships.

Her current best championship result is 29th place in individual eventing from the 2013 Europeans held in Malmö, Sweden.

Abbott has been selected to compete at the 2016 Summer Olympics in Rio de Janeiro with her Irish Sport Horse Euro Prince.

== CCI 5* Results ==
Results
Event	Kentucky	Badminton	Luhmühlen	Burghley	Pau	Adelaide
2014		24th (Euro Prince)				
2015		30th (Euro Prince)			9th (Euro Prince)	
2016	Did not participate					
2017		14th (Euro Prince)		13th (Euro Prince)		
2018		EL (Euro Prince)				
2019		12th (Euro Prince)				
EL = Eliminated; RET = Retired; WD = Withdrew

== International Championship Results ==
Results
Year	Event	Horse	Placing	Notes
2007	European Young Rider Championships	Mandalious	6th	Team
2007	European Young Rider Championships	Mandalious	29th	Individual
2010	World Young Horse Championships	Euro Prince	53rd	CCI**
2013	World Young Horse Championships	Oakley	RET	CCI*
2013	European Championships	Euro Prince	29th	Individual
2014	World Equestrian Games	Euro Prince	EL	Individual
2016	Olympic Games	Euro Prince	8th	Team
2016	Olympic Games	Euro Prince	37th	Individual
2019	World Young Horse Championships	Jewelent	12th	CCI***
EL = Eliminated; RET = Retired; WD = Withdrew
