= Carlos Lobos (equestrian) =

Chilean equestrian (born 1980)

Personal information
- Full name: Carlos Lobos Muñoz
- Other names: Lobito
- Born: 21 December 1980 (age 44)
Medal record
Equestrian
Representing Chile
South American Championships
Silver medal – second place	2014 Barretos	Individual eventing
Silver medal – second place	2014 Barretos	Team eventing
Silver medal – second place	2018 Campo de Mayo	Team eventing

Carlos "Lobito" Lobos Muñoz (born 21 December 1980) is a Chilean Olympic eventing rider, FEI cross-country course designer and army officer. He competed at the 2016 Summer Olympics in Rio de Janeiro, where he finished 29th in the individual competition.

Lobos also participated at three Pan American Games (in 2011, 2015 and 2019). His best result came in 2015, when he placed 5th individually. He qualified to compete at the 2020 Summer Olympics in Tokyo, but withdrew from taking part.
