= Felix Vogg =

Swiss equestrian

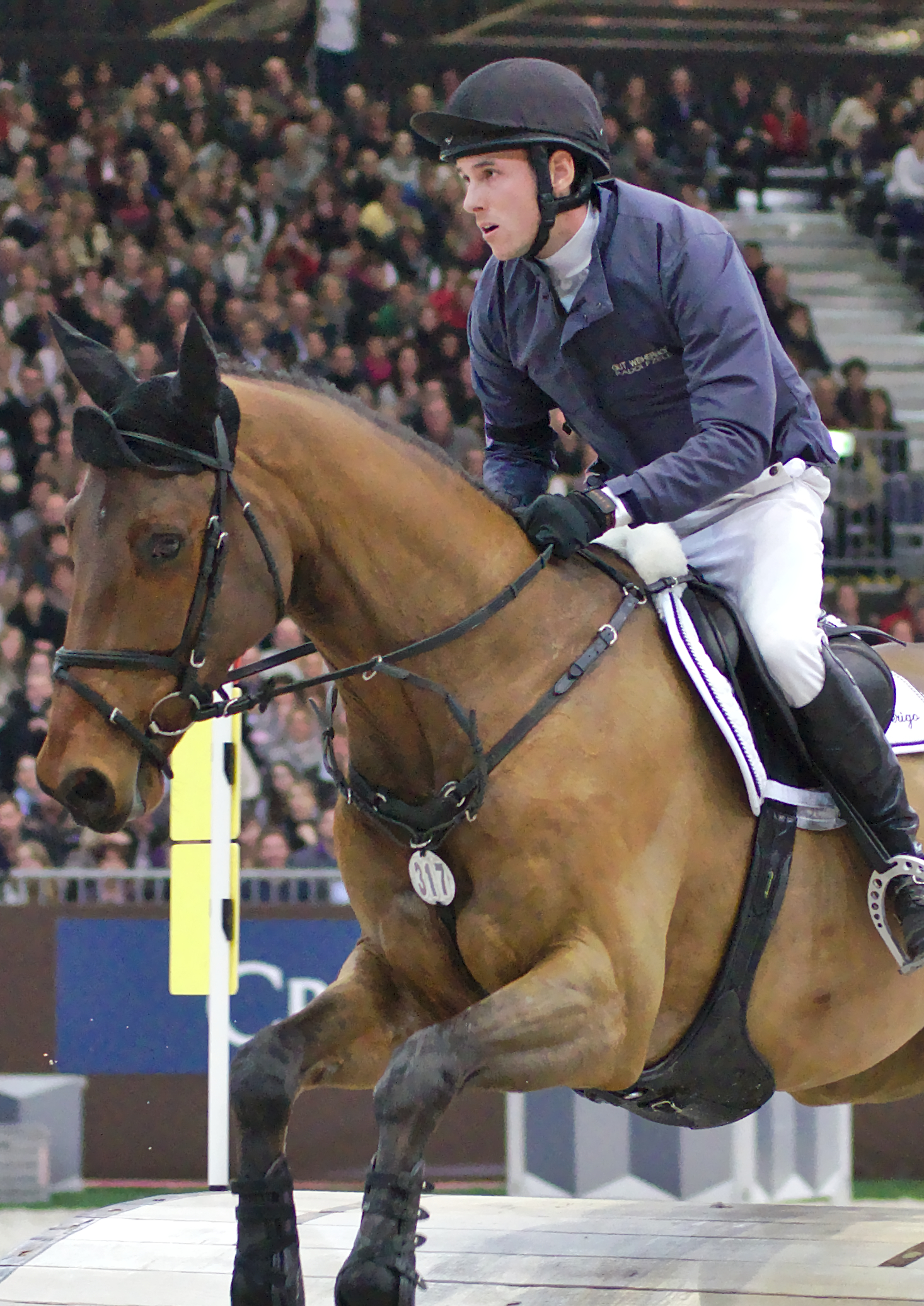
- Vogg and Maverick Mcnamara, CHI Geneva in 2014

Personal information
- Nationality: Swiss
- Born: 19 June 1990 (age 36) Waiblingen, Germany
- Height: 180 cm (5 ft 11 in)

Sport
- Country: Switzerland
- Sport: Equestrian
- Event: Eventing

Felix Vogg (born 19 June 1990) is a Swiss Olympic eventing rider. He competed at the 2016 Summer Olympics in Rio de Janeiro and at the 2020 Summer Olympics in Tokyo.

Vogg also participated 2014, 2018 and 2022at the World Equestrian Games. 2013, 2017, 2019, 2021 and 2023 he competed at the European Eventing Championships.

In 2012 he won the FEI World Cup Eventing title, with his horses Maverick MacNamara and Onfire. At the age of 22, he became the youngest winner of the FEI World Cup Eventing series in history.

Felix has become as well the first Swiss winner of a CCI5*L in over 70 years. (Luhmühlen 2022)

His grandfather Roland Perret competed at the 1956 Summer Olympics, while his brother Ben Vogg also competed at the 2016 Olympics.

At the 2019 Pau CCI***** event, Vogg's partner Archie Rocks suffered a catastrophic shoulder fracture on his approach to a fence late in the cross country course. The decision to euthanize the horse was made by the owners and the show veterinarians after it became clear that the injury was irreparable.

== CCI 5* Results ==
Results
Event	Kentucky	Badminton	Luhmühlen	Burghley	Pau	Adelaide
2024		11th (Cartania)				
2023		15th (Cartania)	20th (Colero)			
2022			1st (Colero)		17th (Colero)	
2019	6th (Colero)				EL (Archie Rocks)	
EL = Eliminated; RET = Retired; WD = Withdrew

== International Championship Results ==
Results
Year	Event	Horse	Placing	Notes
2003	European Pony Championships	Connection D	9th	Team
2003	European Pony Championships	Connection D	18th	Individual
2004	European Pony Championships	Cyrano 89	34th	Individual
2006	European Pony Championships	Connection D	6th	Team
2006	European Pony Championships	Connection D	4th	Individual
2007	European Junior Championships	Joy Des Ibis	7th	Team
2007	European Junior Championships	Joy Des Ibis	28th	Individual
2008	European Young Rider Championships	Cool Hand Luc	8th	Team
2008	European Young Rider Championships	Cool Hand Luc	EL	Individual
2009	European Young Rider Championships	Cool Hand Luc	6th	Team
2009	European Young Rider Championships	Cool Hand Luc	38th	Individual
2010	European Young Rider Championships	Touch of Sportsfield	8th	Team
2010	European Young Rider Championships	Touch of Sportsfield	20th	Individual
2011	World Young Horse Championships	Maverick McNamara	11th	CCI**
2013	European Championships	Onfire	8th	Team
2013	European Championships	Onfire	RET	Individual
2014	World Equestrian Games	Onfire	13th	Team
2014	World Equestrian Games	Onfire	49th	Individual
2016	Olympic Games	Onfire	EL	Individual
2016	World Young Horse Championships	Mathurin v/d Vogelzang	2nd place, silver medalist(s)	CCI*
2017	European Championships	Onfire	7th	Team
2017	European Championships	Onfire	EL	Individual
2018	World Equestrian Games	Colero	16th	Team
2018	World Equestrian Games	Colero	70th	Individual
2019	European Championships	Archie Rocks	8th	Team
2019	European Championships	Archie Rocks	35th	Individual
2021	Olympic Games 2020	Colero	10th 19th	Team Individual
2021	European Championships	Cartania	4th 8th	Team Individual
2022	World Championship	Cartania	7th 14th	Team Individual
2023	European Championships	Colero	5th 11th	Team Individual
EL = Eliminated; RET = Retired; WD = Withdrew
