= Mark Kyle (equestrian) =

Irish equestrian

Personal information
- Born: 5 June 1973 (age 53)

Mark Kyle (born 5 June 1973) is an Irish Olympic eventing rider. Representing Ireland, he competed at three Summer Olympics (in 2004, 2012 and 2016). He placed 5th in team eventing in 2012. Meanwhile, his current best individual Olympic placement is 21st place in the same Games.

Kyle also competed at two editions World Equestrian Games (in 1998 and 2010) and four editions of European Eventing Championships (in 1997, 2003, 2005 and 2011). He is a three-time European youth level team bronze Medallist in equestrian evening. As of 2016, Kyle's best individual championship result is 17th place from the 2003 European Championships in Punchestown, Ireland.

== Four-star results ==
Results
Event	Kentucky	Badminton	Luhmühlen	Burghley	Pau	Adelaide
2002				26th (Drunken Disorderly)		
2003	Did not participate					
2004				15th (Drunken Disorderly)		
2005		21st (Drunken Disorderly)				
2006-2008	Did not participate					
2009					16th (Nitetime Cavalier); 24th (Step In Time); WD (Willow F. A.)	
2010		20th (Step In Time)			15th (Nitetime Cavalier)	
2011		53rd (Step In Time)		24th (Step In Time)		
2012				RET (Willow F. A.); WD (Step In Time)		
2013	Did not participate					
2014		EL (Coolio)				
2015	Did not participate					
2016				27th (Jesmond Justice)		
2017-2019	Did not participate					
EL = Eliminated; RET = Retired; WD = Withdrew
