= 2009 Men's Hockey Champions Challenge II =

Hockey competition held in 2009 Ireland

Tournament details
- Host country: Ireland
- City: Dublin
- Dates: 6–12 July
- Teams: 8 (from 3 confederations)
- Venue: National Hockey Stadium

Final positions
- Champions: Poland (1st title)
- Runner-up: Ireland
- Third place: France

Tournament statistics
- Matches played: 20
- Top scorer: (Ireland) John Jermyn (7 goals)
- Best player: (Poland) Tomasz Dutkiewicz

The 2009 Men's Hockey Champions Challenge II was the inaugural edition of the Champions Challenge II. It was held at the National Hockey Stadium in Dublin, Ireland, from 6 to 12 July 2009.

Poland won the tournament, defeating hosts Ireland 5–4 on penalties after the final finished a 3–3 draw. With the win, Poland gained promotion to the 2011 Champions Challenge I in Johannesburg.

== Teams ==
Qualification for the tournament was based on rankings at the 2008 FIH Olympic Qualifiers.

Dates	Event	Location	Quotas	Qualifiers
2–10 February 2008	2008 FIH Olympic Qualifiers	Auckland, New Zealand	2	France; Ireland
1–9 March 2008	2008 FIH Olympic Qualifiers	Santiago, Chile	3	Austria; Chile; Russia
5–13 April 2008	2008 FIH Olympic Qualifiers	Santiago, Chile	3	Japan; Malaysia; Poland
Total			8	

== Results ==
All times are Irish Standard Time (UTC+1)

=== First round ===
==== Pool A ====
Pos	Team	Pld	W	D	L	GF	GA	GD	Pts	Qualification
1	Poland	3	3	0	0	9	6	+3	9	Semi-finals
2	Ireland (H)	3	2	0	1	8	3	+5	6	Semi-finals
3	Japan	3	1	0	2	6	9	−3	3	
4	Chile	3	0	0	3	5	10	−5	0	

Source: FIH
Rules for classification: 1) points; 2) goal difference; 3) goals scored; 4) head-to-head result.
(H) Hosts

6 July 2009
17:30

Japan	2–3	Poland
Nagasawa 44'; Kitazato 54'		Strykowski 37'; Górny 49', 69'

Umpires:
Michael Eilmer (AUT)
Iskandar Rashdan Rusli (MAS)

6 July 2009
19:45

Ireland	3–0	Chile
Jermyn 8', 30', 49'

Umpires:
Peter Wright (RSA)
Andrew Isaev (RUS)

7 July 2009
17:45

Poland	3–2	Chile
Choczaj 9'; Dutkiewicz 15'; Juszczak 42'		Krainz 12', 47'

Umpires:
Michael Eilmer (AUT)
Benoit Chopin (FRA)

7 July 2009
20:00

Ireland	3–0	Japan
Jermyn 11', 18'; Watt 30'

Umpires:
Ged Curran (ECO)
Iskandar Rashdan Rusli (MAS)

9 July 2009
17:30

Japan	4–3	Chile
Mitani 3'; Furusato 34'; Kitazato 36', 54'		Montegu 55'; Berzcely 60'; Eggers 69'

Umpires:
Michael Eilmer (AUT)
Andrey Isaev (RUS)

9 July 2009
19:45

Poland	3–2	Ireland
Górny 7'; Janiszewski 30'; Dutkiewicz 39'		Watt 5'; Sothern 24'

Umpires:
Peter Wright (RSA)
Benoit Chopin (FRA)

==== Pool B ====
Pos	Team	Pld	W	D	L	GF	GA	GD	Pts	Qualification
1	Malaysia	3	3	0	0	11	7	+4	9	Semi-finals
2	France	3	2	0	1	12	8	+4	6	Semi-finals
3	Russia	3	0	1	2	10	13	−3	1	
4	Austria	3	0	1	2	7	12	−5	1	

Source: FIH
Rules for classification: 1) points; 2) goal difference; 3) goals scored; 4) head-to-head result.

6 July 2009
13:00

Malaysia	3–2	Austria
Singh 4'; A. Rahim 46', 49'		Körper 43', 60'

Umpires:
Ged Curran (ECO)
Yoshikuni Tomiyama (JPN)

6 July 2009
15:15

France	5–3	Russia
Jean-Jean 14'; Martin-Brisac 17'; Soyez 40'; Becuwe 56', 70'		Sergeev 19', 68'; Mayorov 37'

Umpires:
David Stewart (IRL)
Krzysztof Cholewa (POL)

7 July 2009
13:15

Austria	4–4	Russia
Körper 31', 64'; Stanzl 39'; Monghy 53'		Sergeev 7', 48'; Mokrousov 13'; Azarov 20'

Umpires:
Krzysztof Cholewa (POL)
Martin Vatter (CHI)

7 July 2009
15:30

France	2–4	Malaysia
Sevestre 22'; Becuwe 68'		Ismail 14'; A. Rahim 34'; Azlan 37'; R. Rahim 41'

Umpires:
Peter Wright (RSA)
Yoshikuni Tomiyama (JPN)

9 July 2009
13:00

Malaysia	4–3	Russia
Ismail 8'; Hafifi 30'; Tengku 53'; Faizal 66'		Sergeev 42', 57'; Mamoshkin 43'

Umpires:
Martin Vatter (CHI)
Krzystof Cholewa (POL)

9 July 2009
15:15

Austria	1–5	France
Körper 39'		Soyez 16', 59'; Becuwe 18'; Durchon 64', 66'

Umpires:
Ged Curran (ECO)
David Stewart (IRL)

=== Fifth to eighth place classification ===
Crossover
11 July 2009
Japan	4
Austria	2
11 July 2009
Russia	2
Chile	1

Fifth place
12 July 2009
Japan	9
Russia	2
Seventh place
12 July 2009
Austria	4
Chile	2

==== Crossover ====
11 July 2009
09:30

Japan	4–2	Austria
Furusato 22'; Anai 25'; Mitani 48', 50'	Report	Stanzl 17'; Laminger 58'

Umpires:
Martin Vatter (CHI)
Krzysztof Cholewa (POL)

11 July 2009
12:00

Russia	2–1	Chile
Likov 14'; Platonov 64'	Report	Kannegiesser 68'

Umpires:
Yoshikuni Tomiyama (JPN)
Benoit Chopin (FRA)

==== Seventh and eighth place ====
12 July 2009
09:30

Austria	4–2	Chile
Körper 9'; Grandits 17'; Stanzl 28'; Hübner 39'	Report	Richter 11'; Krainz 47'

Umpires:
Iskandar Rashdan Rusli (MAS)
David Stewart (IRL)

==== Fifth and sixth place ====
12 July 2009
12:00

Japan	9–2	Russia
Anai 6', 64', 69'; Nagawasa 41', 49'; Watanabe 45'; Tsubouchi 55'; Furusato 59'; Ono 62'	Report	Platonov 19'; Azarov 22'

Umpires:
Benoit Chopin (FRA)
Martin Vatter (CHI)

=== First to fourth place classification ===
Semi-finals
11 July 2009
Poland	3
France	1
11 July 2009
Malaysia	1
Ireland	2

Final
12 July 2009
Poland (pen.)	3 (5)
Ireland	3 (4)
Third place
12 July 2009
France (a.e.t.)	4
Malaysia	3

==== Semifinals ====
11 July 2009
14:30

Poland	3–1	France
Strykowski 10'; Oszyjczyk 30'; Dutkiewicz 54'	Report	Soyez 3'

Umpires:
Iskandar Rashdan Rusli (MAS)
David Stewart (IRL)

11 July 2009
17:00

Malaysia	1–2	Ireland
Tengku 20'	Report	Jermyn 5'; Hobbs 57'

Umpires:
Andrey Isaev (RUS)
Michael Eilmer (AUT)

==== Third and fourth place ====
12 July 2009
14:30

France	4–3 (a.e.t.)	Malaysia
Genestet 16'; Soyez 22', 77'; Jean-Jean 44'	Report	Hanafi 32'; Sandrakasi 58'; R. Rahim 65'

Umpires:
Andrey Isaev (RUS)
Yoshikuni Tomiyama (JPN)

==== Final ====
12 July 2009
17:00

Poland	3–3 (a.e.t.)	Ireland
Strykowski 39', 70'; Rachwalski 57'	Report	Watt 4', 50'; Jermyn 16'
Penalties
Dutkiewicz (penalty shoot-out missed); Rachwalski; Hutek (penalty shoot-out scored); Górny (penalty shoot-out scored); Janiszewski (penalty shoot-out scored); Dutkiewicz (penalty shoot-out scored)	5–4	(penalty shoot-out scored) Butler; (penalty shoot-out scored) Jermyn; (penalty shoot-out missed) Brennan; (penalty shoot-out scored) Cockram; (penalty shoot-out scored) Gormley; (penalty shoot-out missed) Butler

Umpires:
Ged Curran (ECO)
Peter Wright (RSA)

== Awards ==
Top scorer	Player of the Tournament
(Ireland) John Jermyn	(Poland) Tomasz Dutkiewicz

== Final rankings ==
Pos	Team	Pld	W	D	L	GF	GA	GD	Pts	Qualification
1st place, gold medalist(s)	Poland	5	4	1	0	15	10	+5	13	Qualified for 2011 Champions Challenge I
2nd place, silver medalist(s)	Ireland (H)	5	3	1	1	13	7	+6	10	
3rd place, bronze medalist(s)	France	5	3	0	2	17	14	+3	9	
4	Malaysia	5	3	0	2	15	13	+2	9	
5	Japan	5	3	0	2	19	13	+6	9	
6	Russia	5	1	1	3	14	23	−9	4	
7	Austria	5	1	1	3	13	18	−5	4	
8	Chile	5	0	0	5	8	16	−8	0	

Source: FIH
(H) Hosts

== Goalscorers ==
There were 114 goals scored in 20 matches, for an average of 5.7 goals per match.

7 goals

- (Ireland) John Jermyn

6 goals

- (Austria) Michael Körper
- (France) Frédéric Soyez
- (Russia) Aleksei Sergeyev

4 goals

- (France) Arnaud Becuwe
- (Ireland) Michael Watt
- (Japan) Yoshihiro Anai
- (Poland) Marcin Strykowski

3 goals

- (Austria) Benjamin Stanzl
- (Chile) Esteban Krainz
- (Japan) Ryuji Furusato
- (Japan) Kenji Kitazato
- (Japan) Genki Mitani
- (Japan) Katsuyoshi Nagasawa
- (Malaysia) Amin Rahim
- (Poland) Tomasz Dutkiewicz
- (Poland) Tomasz Górny

2 goals

- (France) Matthieu Durchon
- (France) Sebastien Jean-Jean
- (Malaysia) Ismail Abu
- (Malaysia) Hafifi Hafiz Hanafi
- (Malaysia) Razie Rahim
- (Malaysia) Tengku Ahmad Tajuddin
- (Russia) Dmitry Azarov
- (Russia) Alexandre Platonov

1 goal

- (Austria) Manuel Grandits
- (Austria) Tobias Hübner
- (Austria) Wolfgang Laminger
- (Austria) Dominik Monghy
- (Chile) Alexis Berczely
- (Chile) Felipe Eggers
- (Chile) Thomas Kannegiesser
- (Chile) Felipe Montegu
- (Chile) Jan Richter
- (France) Martin Genestet
- (France) Nicolas Martin-Brisac
- (France) Lucas Sevestre
- (Ireland) David Hobbs
- (Ireland) Alan Sothern
- (Japan) Tomonori Ono
- (Japan) Kazuhiro Tsubouchi
- (Japan) Hiroki Watanabe
- (Malaysia) Azlan Misron
- (Malaysia) Faizal Saari
- (Malaysia) Selvaraju Sandrakasi
- (Malaysia) Kevinder Makbul Singh
- (Poland) Tomasz Choczaj
- (Poland) Maciej Janiszewski
- (Poland) Miroslaw Juszczak
- (Poland) Szymon Oszyjczyk
- (Poland) Dariusz Rachwalski
- (Russia) Alexander Likov
- (Russia) Alexey Mamoshkin
- (Russia) Alexey Mayorov
- (Russia) Evgeny Mokrousov
