= Jonty Evans =

Irish eventing rider

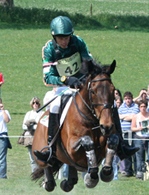
- Jonty Evans at Badminton Horse Trials (2007)

Personal information
- Born: 4 October 1971 (age 54) Burton-on-Trent, England

Jonty Evans (born 4 October 1971) is an Irish eventing rider.

== Personal life ==
Evans grew up near Trefriw, in the Conwy valley in North Wales. He is married with two children and lived near Cheltenham in the Cotswolds, where he had a yard. He now lives near Broadway in Worcestershire.

== Eventing career ==
Evans has been competing internationally in eventing for more than twenty years. Although brought up in Wales, Evans represents Ireland, thanks to his grandfather having been born in Northern Ireland, allowing him to hold an Irish passport.

Evans competed at the 2005 European Eventing Championships where he was placed 7th in team eventing and 40th in individual eventing competition. In 2015, he helped lead the Irish team to the nation's first-ever Irish FEI Eventing Nations' Cup victory in the Boekelo Nations' Cup.

Evans was selected to compete at the 2016 Summer Olympics in Rio de Janeiro with his Irish Sport Horse Cooley Rorkes Drift. This was Evans first time to make the Olympic team. The Irish team finished eighth in the three-day eventing competition, but Evans qualified for the individual eventing final. He finished ninth in the individual eventing competition.

In 2017 the owner of Cooley Rorkes Drift (Art) decided to sell him - which meant Jonty would have lost the horse. So Jonty set up a crowdfunding initiative to buy him. It was a massive success and on 9 August 2017, Jonty bought Cooley Rorkes Drift with the help of £500,000 raised by crowdfunding.

On 3 June 2018, during the cross-country portion of the Tattersalls event in Ireland, Evans suffered a serious brain injury from a fall.

== Controversies ==
On 31 December 2020 the Low Pay Commission of the Department for Business, Energy and Industrial Strategy revealed that "Mr Jonathan Evans, trading as Jonty Evans Equestrian Activities, Gloucester, failed to pay £5,008.16 to 5 workers"
