= Justin Sheriff =

Irish field hockey player

Justin Sheriff (born 18 May 1979 in Dublin) is a field hockey player from Ireland who, as of 22 September 2005, played 73 international matches for his native country. The striker from Pembroke Wanderers made his debut in 2000 against Wales. He has been prolific from short corners by specialising in drag flicking. He has played professional hockey in Belgium. He was a member of Pembroke's 2009 Irish Senior Cup championship team.
