= Men's Hockey Champions Challenge II =

8 team contest

The Men's Hockey Champions Challenge II was an international field hockey competition introduced by the International Hockey Federation in 2009. The tournament was held in an uneven year, and contested by eight teams based on the qualification criteria set by the federation that usually not competing in Champions Trophy and Champions Challenge. The winner of the competition will be promoted to subsequent tournament of Champions Challenge.

== Summaries ==
Year	Host	Final			Third place match
Year	Host	Winner	Score	Runner-up	Third place	Score	Fourth place
2009; Details	Dublin, Ireland	Poland	3–3 (5–4); Penalty strokes	Ireland	France	4–3 after extra time	Malaysia
2011; Details	Lille, France	Ireland	4–2	France	Russia	3–1	Scotland

== Successful national teams ==
Team	Titles	Runners-up	Third places	Fourth places
Ireland	1 (2011)	1 (2009*)		
Poland	1 (2009)			
France		1 (2011*)	1 (2009)	
Russia			1 (2011)	
Malaysia				1 (2009)
Scotland				1 (2011)

* = host nation

== Team appearances ==
Team	2009	2011	Total
Austria	7th	8th	2
Chile	8th	-	1
China	-	6th	1
Czech Republic	-	5th	1
France	3rd	2nd	2
Ireland	2nd	1st	2
Japan	5th	-	1
Malaysia	4th	-	1
Poland	1st	-	1
Russia	6th	3rd	2
Scotland	-	4th	1
United States	-	7th	1
Total	8	8	16
