= Russia at the 2016 Summer Olympics =

- IOC code: RUS
- NOC: Russian Olympic Committee
- Website: www.olympic.ru (in Russian)

in Rio de Janeiro
- Competitors: 282 in 26 sports
- Flag bearers: Sergey Tetyukhin (opening); Natalia Ishchenko and Svetlana Romashina (closing)
- Medals Ranked 4th: Gold 19 Silver 17 Bronze 20 Total 56

Summer Olympics appearances (overview)
- 1996; 2000; 2004; 2008; 2012; 2016; 2020–2024; 2028

Other related appearances
- Russian Empire (1900–1912); Soviet Union (1952–1988); Unified Team (1992); ROC (2020); Individual Neutral Athletes (2024)

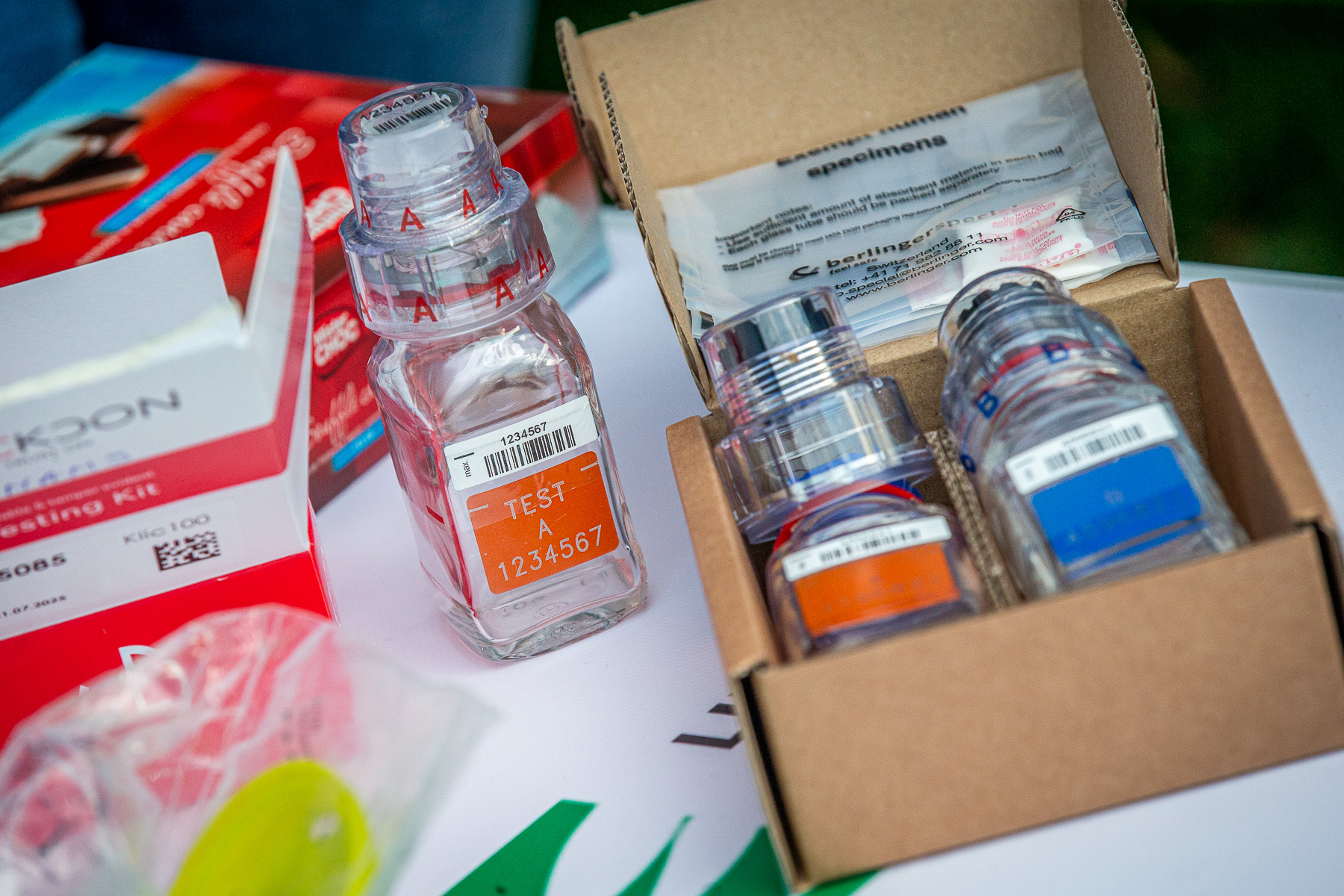
Urine doping sampling security bottles

The Russian Federation competed at the 2016 Summer Olympics in Rio de Janeiro, Brazil, from 5 to 21 August 2016. This was Russia's sixth consecutive appearance at the Summer Olympics as an independent nation. The nation finished fourth in the medal standings, with 19 gold and 56 total medals, ensuring that Soviet and Russian athletes had never placed below fourth since they started participating in 1952.

On 18 July 2016, an independent investigation commissioned by World Anti-Doping Agency concluded that it was shown "beyond a reasonable doubt" that the RUSADA, the Ministry of Sport, the Federal Security Service (FSB) and the Centre of Sports Preparation of the National Teams of Russia had "operated for the protection of doped Russian athletes" within a "state-directed failsafe system" using "the disappearing positive [test] methodology." According to the McLaren Report, the Disappearing Positive Methodology operated from "at least late 2011 to August 2015." It was used on 643 positive samples, a number that the authors consider "only a minimum" due to limited access to Russian records. Based on these findings the International Olympic Committee called for an emergency meeting to consider banning Russia from the Summer Olympics.

On 24 July, the IOC rejected WADA's recommendation to ban Russia from the Summer Olympics and announced that a decision would be made by each sport federation with each positive decision having to be approved by a CAS arbitrator. On 7 August 2016, the IOC cleared 278 athletes, while 111 were removed because of the scandal.

On 7 August 2016, the International Paralympic Committee announced that it had voted unanimously to ban the entire Russian Paralympic team from competing at the 2016 Summer Paralympics, in the wake of a larger scandal that exposed the participation of Russian Olympic and Paralympic athletes in a state-sponsored doping program.

On 8 December 2016, silver medalist Misha Aloyan was found to have committed an anti-doping rule violation after testing positive for Tuaminoheptane, a specified stimulant, prohibited in-competition under S6 on the WADA Prohibited List, during an in-competition doping control on 21 August 2016. The results obtained by the athlete at the Rio 2016 Olympic Games were disqualified.

On 9 December 2016, Canadian lawyer Richard McLaren published the second part of his independent report. The investigation claimed that from 2011 to 2015, more than 1,000 Russian competitors in various sports (including summer, winter, and Paralympic sports) were involved in a cover-up. Emails indicate that athletes who tested positive for banned substances included five blind powerlifters, who may have been given drugs without their knowledge, and a fifteen-year-old.

== Medalists ^{[a]} ==
Medal	Name	Sport	Event	Date
Gold	Beslan Mudranov	Judo	Men's 60 kg	6 August
Gold	Yana Egorian	Fencing	Women's sabre	8 August
Gold	Khasan Khalmurzaev	Judo	Men's 81 kg	9 August
Gold	Inna Deriglazova	Fencing	Women's foil	10 August
Gold	Artur Akhmatkhuzin; Aleksey Cheremisinov; Timur Safin	Fencing	Men's team foil	12 August
Gold	Yekaterina Dyachenko; Yuliya Gavrilova; Yana Egorian; Sofya Velikaya	Fencing	Women's team sabre	13 August
Gold	Ekaterina Makarova; Elena Vesnina	Tennis	Women's doubles	14 August
Gold	Aliya Mustafina	Gymnastics	Women's uneven bars	14 August
Gold	Roman Vlasov	Wrestling	Men's Greco-Roman 75 kg	14 August
Gold	Davit Chakvetadze	Wrestling	Men's Greco-Roman 85 kg	15 August
Gold	Evgeny Tishchenko	Boxing	Men's heavyweight	15 August
Gold	Natalia Ishchenko; Svetlana Romashina	Synchronized swimming	Women's duet	16 August
Gold	Vlada Chigireva; Natalia Ishchenko; Svetlana Kolesnichenko; Aleksandra Patskevich; Elena Prokofyeva; Svetlana Romashina; Alla Shishkina; Gelena Topilina; Maria Shurochkina	Synchronized swimming	Women's team	19 August
Gold	Russia women's national handball team: Anna Sedoykina; Polina Kuznetsova; Daria Dmitrieva; Anna Sen; Olga Akopyan; Anna Vyakhireva; Marina Sudakova; Vladlena Bobrovnikova; Victoria Zhilinskayte; Yekaterina Marennikova; Irina Bliznova; Ekaterina Ilina; Maya Petrova; Tatyana Yerokhina; Victoriya Kalinina	Handball	Women's team	20 August
Gold	Abdulrashid Sadulaev	Wrestling	Men's freestyle 86 kg	20 August
Gold	Margarita Mamun	Gymnastics	Women's rhythmic individual all-around	20 August
Gold	Aleksander Lesun	Modern pentathlon	Men's	20 August
Gold	Vera Biriukova; Anastasia Bliznyuk; Anastasia Maksimova; Anastasiia Tatareva; Maria Tolkacheva	Gymnastics	Women's rhythmic group all-around	21 August
Gold	Soslan Ramonov	Wrestling	Men's freestyle 65 kg	21 August
Silver	Vitalina Batsarashkina	Shooting	Women's 10 m air pistol	7 August
Silver	Tuyana Dashidorzhieva; Ksenia Perova; Inna Stepanova	Archery	Women's team	7 August
Silver	Sofya Velikaya	Fencing	Women's sabre	8 August
Silver	Denis Ablyazin; David Belyavskiy; Nikolai Kuksenkov; Nikita Nagornyy; Ivan Stretovich	Gymnastics	Men's team	8 August
Silver	Yuliya Yefimova	Swimming	Women's 100 m breaststroke	8 August
Silver	Angelina Melnikova; Aliya Mustafina; Maria Paseka; Daria Spiridonova; Seda Tutkhalyan	Gymnastics	Women's team	9 August
Silver	Olga Zabelinskaya	Cycling	Women's road time trial	10 August
Silver	Yuliya Yefimova	Swimming	Women's 200 m breaststroke	11 August
Silver	Daria Shmeleva; Anastasia Voynova	Cycling	Women's team sprint	12 August
Silver	Sergey Kamenskiy	Shooting	Men's 50 m rifle three positions	14 August
Silver	Maria Paseka	Gymnastics	Women's vault	14 August
Silver	Denis Ablyazin	Gymnastics	Men's vault	15 August
Silver	Valeria Koblova	Wrestling	Women's freestyle 58 kg	17 August
Silver	Nataliya Vorobyova	Wrestling	Women's freestyle 69kg	17 August
Silver	Alexey Denisenko	Taekwondo	Men's 68 kg	18 August
Silver	Aniuar Geduev	Wrestling	Men's freestyle 74 kg	19 August
Silver	Yana Kudryavtseva	Gymnastics	Women's rhythmic individual all-around	20 August
Bronze	Natalia Kuziutina	Judo	Women's 52 kg	7 August
Bronze	Timur Safin	Fencing	Men's foil	7 August
Bronze	Vladimir Maslennikov	Shooting	Men's 10 m air rifle	8 August
Bronze	Anton Chupkov	Swimming	Men's 200 m breaststroke	10 August
Bronze	Olga Kochneva; Violetta Kolobova; Tatiana Logunova; Lyubov Shutova	Fencing	Women's team épée	11 August
Bronze	Aliya Mustafina	Gymnastics	Women's artistic individual	11 August
Bronze	Evgeny Rylov	Swimming	Men's 200 m backstroke	11 August
Bronze	Kirill Grigoryan	Shooting	Men's 50 m rifle prone	12 August
Bronze	Stefania Elfutina	Sailing	Women's RS:X	14 August
Bronze	Denis Dmitriev	Cycling	Men's sprint	14 August
Bronze	Denis Ablyazin	Gymnastics	Men's rings	15 August
Bronze	Sergey Semenov	Wrestling	Men's Greco-Roman 130 kg	15 August
Bronze	Roman Anoshkin	Canoeing	Men's K-1 1000 metres	16 August
Bronze	David Belyavskiy	Gymnastics	Men's parallel bars	16 August
Bronze	Anastasia Belyakova	Boxing	Women's lightweight	17 August
Bronze	Vladimir Nikitin	Boxing	Men's bantamweight	18 August
Bronze	Ekaterina Bukina	Wrestling	Women's freestyle 75 kg	18 August
Bronze	Russia women's national water polo team: Anna Ustyukhina; Maria Borisova; Ekaterina Prokofyeva; Elvina Karimova; Nadezhda Fedotova; Olga Belova; Ekaterina Lisunova; Anastasia Simanovich; Anna Timofeeva; Evgenia Soboleva; Evgeniya Ivanova; Anna Grineva; Anna Karnaukh	Water polo	Women's team	19 August
Bronze	Vitaly Dunaytsev	Boxing	Men's light welterweight	19 August
Bronze	Ilya Shtokalov	Canoeing	Men's C-1 1000 metres	16 August

^{Medal Changes} Silver medalist Misha Aloyan was found to have committed an anti-doping rule violation after testing positive for Tuaminoheptane, a specified stimulant, prohibited in-competition under S6 on the WADA Prohibited List, during an in-competition doping control on 21 August 2016. The results obtained by the athlete in the Rio 2016 Olympic Games were disqualified.

Medals by sport
Sport	1st place, gold medalist(s)	2nd place, silver medalist(s)	3rd place, bronze medalist(s)	Total
Wrestling	4	3	2	9
Fencing	4	1	2	7
Gymnastics	3	5	3	11
Judo	2	0	1	3
Synchronized swimming	2	0	0	2
Boxing	1	0	3	4
Handball	1	0	0	1
Modern pentathlon	1	0	0	1
Tennis	1	0	0	1
Shooting	0	2	2	4
Swimming	0	2	2	4
Cycling	0	2	1	3
Archery	0	1	0	1
Taekwondo	0	1	0	1
Canoeing	0	0	2	2
Sailing	0	0	1	1
Water polo	0	0	1	1
Total	19	17	20	56

Medals by day
Day	1st place, gold medalist(s)	2nd place, silver medalist(s)	3rd place, bronze medalist(s)	Total
6 August	1	0	0	1
7 August	0	2	2	4
8 August	1	3	1	5
9 August	1	1	0	2
10 August	1	1	1	3
11 August	0	1	3	4
12 August	1	1	1	3
13 August	1	0	0	1
14 August	3	2	2	7
15 August	2	1	2	5
16 August	1	0	3	4
17 August	0	2	1	3
18 August	0	1	2	3
19 August	1	1	2	4
20 August	4	1	0	5
21 August	2	1	0	3
Total	19	17	20	56

Medals by gender
Gender	1st place, gold medalist(s)	2nd place, silver medalist(s)	3rd place, bronze medalist(s)	Total	Percentage
Male	9	5	13	27	48.2%
Female	10	12	7	29	51.8%
Total	19	17	20	56	100%

== Russian doping scandal ==
Media attention began growing in December 2014 when German broadcaster ARD reported on state-sponsored doping in Russia, comparing it to doping in East Germany. In November 2015, the World Anti-Doping Agency (WADA) published a report and the International Association of Athletics Federations (IAAF) suspended Russia indefinitely from world track and field events. The United Kingdom Anti-Doping agency later assisted WADA with testing in Russia. In June 2016, they reported that they were unable to fully carry out their work and noted intimidation by armed Federal Security Service (FSB) agents. After a Russian former lab director made allegations about the 2014 Winter Olympics in Sochi, WADA commissioned an independent investigation led by Richard McLaren. McLaren's investigation found corroborating evidence, concluding in a report published in July 2016 that the Ministry of Sport and the FSB had operated a "state-directed failsafe system" using a "disappearing positive [test] methodology" (DPM) from "at least late 2011 to August 2015".

In response to these findings, WADA announced that RUSADA should be regarded as non-compliant with respect to the World Anti-Doping Code and recommended that Russia be banned from competing at the 2016 Summer Olympics. The International Olympic Commission (IOC) rejected the recommendation, stating that the IOC and each sport's international federation would make decisions on each athlete's individual basis. One day prior to the opening ceremony, 278 athletes were cleared to compete under the Russian flag, while 111 were removed because of doping.

Unlike the IOC, the International Paralympic Committee voted unanimously to ban the entire Russian team from the 2016 Summer Paralympics and suspended the Russian Paralympic Committee, having found evidence that the DPM was also in operation at the 2014 Winter Paralympics.

The IOC's decision on 24 July 2016 was widely criticized by both athletes and writers, as well as members of the Olympic Committee. WADA's president Craig Reedie said, "WADA is disappointed that the IOC did not heed WADA's Executive Committee recommendations that were based on the outcomes of the McLaren Investigation and would have ensured a straight-forward, strong and harmonized approach." On the IOC's decision to exclude Stepanova, WADA director general Olivier Niggli stated that his agency was "very concerned by the message that this sends whistleblowers for the future." A member of the IOC Athletes' Commission, Hayley Wickenheiser, wrote, "I ask myself if we were not dealing with Russia would this decision to ban a nation [have] been an easier one? I fear the answer is yes". Writing for Deutsche Welle in Germany, Olivia Gerstenberger said that the head of the IOC, Thomas Bach had "flunked" his first serious test, adding, "With this decision, the credibility of the organization is shattered once more, while that of state-sponsored doping actually receives a minor boost". Bild (Germany) described Bach as "Putin's poodle".

The positive evaluation of every eligible participant is to be confirmed by a CAS arbitrator, which is "independent from any sports organization involved in the Olympic Games Rio 2016". On 30 July 2016, the IOC specified that following each federation's positive evaluation and its arbitration approval, a three-person IOC panel would be making the final decision. Originally Russia submitted a list of 389 athletes for competition. On 7 August 2016, the IOC cleared 278 athletes, while 111 were removed because of the scandal.

=== Athletics ===
On 17 June 2016, the International Association of Athletics Federations (IAAF) announced that Russia will not be permitted to field competitors in athletics due to the November 2015 doping-related temporary suspension of the All-Russia Athletic Federation (ARAF) from the IAAF, due to state-sponsored doping. Only Russian athletes tested mainly outside of the country under stringent measures would be allowed to participate in the 2016 Olympics. On 21 June 2016, the International Olympic Committee upheld the decision of the IAAF and banned ARAF from competing at the Summer Olympics. One month later, the Court of Arbitration for Sport rejected separate ARAF and "68 Claimant Athletes" appeals of the IAAF decision.

On 24 July 2016, the IOC rejected the IAAF and the World Anti-Doping Agency recommendation that if allowed Russian athletes could only compete as "neutral" athletes under the Olympic flag. Out of the 68 ARAF submitted athletes, only Darya Klishina was allowed to compete.

=== Weightlifting ===
Russian weightlifters had qualified their reduced maximum of six men's and four women's quota places for the Rio Olympics based on their combined team standing by points at the 2014 and 2015 IWF World Championships.

On 22 June 2016, the International Weightlifting Federation (IWF) announced that Russia would lose two quota places in Weightlifting at the 2016 Summer Olympics because of doping violations. IWF then went on to state that if the testing of 'B' samples proved to confirm that any country had three or more violations in the 2008 and 2012 Olympic re-testing programme, then that country would be suspended from international weightlifting for a period of one year, and would thereby be excluded from taking part in the Rio Olympics, alongside the already suspended Bulgaria. IWF clarified that after re-testing 'A' samples from 2008 and 2012 that the three countries thereby scheduled for suspension were Kazakhstan, Russia and Belarus. Russia appealed the decision to the Court of Arbitration for Sport on 6 July 2016.

On 29 July 2016, the International Weightlifting Federation issued a statement, stating that "the integrity of the weightlifting sport has been seriously damaged on multiple times and levels by the Russians, therefore an appropriate sanction was applied in order to preserve the status of the sport." The IWF noted that four further retests from Russian medalists at the 2012 Games had come back positive, that two of the Russian team had been withdrawn for previous bans in accordance with the IOC decision of 24 July 2016, and that of the remaining six entries from Russia, four were implicated in the 'disappearing positive methodology' uncovered by the McLaren report into state-sanctioned doping. IWF expressed its 'extreme shock and disappointment' at the statistics, stated that the Russian weightlifting had brought the sport into disrepute, and then sanctioned Russian weightlifting with a complete ban from the Games; the second team to receive it after Bulgaria. Following the decision, the executive board transferred to quota places that came available to Albania, Georgia and Macedonia (women) and to Belgium, Croatia, El Salvador, Mongolia and Serbia. The ban was upheld by the ad hoc division of the Court of Arbitration for Sports.

=== Banned athletes ===
Sport	Men	Women	Total
Athletics	30	37	67
Canoeing	2	2	4
Cycling	2	1	3
Modern Pentathlon	1	0	1
Rowing	15	11	26
Weightlifting	6	4	10
Wrestling	1	0	1
Total	27 excl. Athletics	18 excl. Athletics	111

== Competitors ==
The following is the list of the numbers of competitors who competed at the Games. The final number of competing athletes was 282.

Note that 1 reserve player that competed in Handball due to an injury to another player, is not counted as an athlete.

Sport	Men	Women	Total
Archery	0	3	3
Athletics	0	1	1
Badminton	3	1	4
Boxing	9	2	11
Canoeing	12	3	15
Cycling	7	5	12
Diving	4	4	8
Equestrian	2	3	5
Fencing	9	10	19
Golf	0	1	1
Gymnastics	7	13	20
Handball	0	14	14
Judo	7	5	12
Modern pentathlon	1	2	3
Rowing	4	0	4
Sailing	4	3	7
Shooting	12	6	18
Swimming	23	13	36
Synchronized swimming	—	9	9
Table tennis	1	2	3
Taekwondo	2	1	3
Tennis	3	5	8
Triathlon	3	3	6
Volleyball	16	14	30
Water polo	0	13	13
Wrestling	12	5	17
Total	141	141	282

== Archery ==
Russian archers qualified for the women's events after having secured a top eight finish in the team recurve at the 2015 World Archery Championships in Copenhagen, Denmark. The archery team was named to the Olympic roster on 13 July 2016.

On 25 July 2016, World Archery Federation announced that, following the criteria set down for the entry of Russian athletes to the 2016 Summer Olympics, that the three archers competing for Russia had been deemed eligible. On 4 August 2016, the IOC cleared all of the archers to participate.

Athlete	Event	Ranking round		Round of 64	Round of 32	Round of 16	Quarterfinals	Semifinals	Final / BM	
Athlete	Event	Score	Seed	Opposition Score	Opposition Score	Opposition Score	Opposition Score	Opposition Score	Opposition Score	Rank
Tuyana Dashidorzhieva	Women's individual	654	5	Karma (BHU); W 7–3	Cao H (CHN); L 4–6	did not advance				
Ksenia Perova	Women's individual	641	17	Sánchez (COL); W 6–4	Stepanova (RUS); L 3–7	did not advance				
Inna Stepanova	Women's individual	643	16	Nemati (IRI); W 6–2	Perova (RUS); W 7–3	Choi M-s (KOR); L 3–7	did not advance			
Tuyana Dashidorzhieva; Ksenia Perova; Inna Stepanova	Women's team	1938	2	—N/a		Bye	India; W 5–4	Italy; W 5–3	South Korea; L 1–5	2nd place, silver medalist(s)

== Athletics ==
Key

- Note–Ranks given for track events are within the athlete's heat only
- Q = Qualified for the next round
- q = Qualified for the next round as a fastest loser or, in field events, by position without achieving the qualifying target
- NR = National record
- N/A = Round not applicable for the event
- Bye = Athlete not required to compete in round

Field events

Athlete	Event	Qualification		Final	
Athlete	Event	Distance	Position	Distance	Position
Darya Klishina	Women's long jump	6.64	8 q	6.63	9

== Badminton ==
Russia has qualified four badminton players for each of the following events into the Olympic tournament. Vladimir Malkov and Natalia Perminova were selected among the top 34 individual shuttlers each in the men's and women's singles, while London 2012 Olympians Vladimir Ivanov and Ivan Sozonov secured the men's doubles spot by virtue of their top 16 finish in the Badminton World Federation World Rankings as of 5 May 2016. On 28 July 2016, BFW cleared all four athletes for competition.

Athlete	Event	Group Stage				Elimination	Quarterfinal	Semifinal	Final / BM	
Athlete	Event	Opposition Score	Opposition Score	Opposition Score	Rank	Opposition Score	Opposition Score	Opposition Score	Opposition Score	Rank
Vladimir Malkov	Men's singles	Nguyễn T M (VIE); L (21–15, 9–21, 13–21)	Lin D (CHN); L (18–21, 7–21)	Obernosterer (AUT); W (21–11, 21–10)	3	did not advance				
Vladimir Ivanov; Ivan Sozonov	Men's doubles	Lee S-m / Tsai C-h (TPE); W (21–11, 22–20)	Chau / Serasinghe (AUS); W (21–16, 21–16)	Lee Y-d / Yoo Y-s (KOR); W (21–17, 19–21, 21–16)	1 Q	—N/a	Chai B / Hong Wi (CHN); L (13–21, 21–16, 16–21)	did not advance		
Natalia Perminova	Women's singles	Baldauf (AUT); W (21–17, 21–8)	Tai T-y (TPE); L (12–21, 9–21)	—N/a	2	did not advance				

== Boxing ==
Russia has entered eleven boxers to compete in the following weight classes into the Olympic boxing tournament. Vladimir Nikitin and Adlan Abdurashidov were the only Russians finishing among the top two of their respective division in the World Series of Boxing, while three further boxers (Aloyan, Zamkovoy, and Chebotarev) did so in the AIBA Pro Boxing Series. Vasily Yegorov, Vitaly Dunaytsev, and Evgeny Tishchenko had claimed their Olympic spots at the 2015 World Championships.

Yaroslava Yakushina and Anastasia Belyakova were the only two Russian women to book their Olympic spots with a semifinal victory at the 2016 European Qualification Tournament in Samsun, Turkey, and with a quarterfinal victory at the Women's World Championships in Astana, Kazakhstan, respectively. Meanwhile, Petr Khamukov secured an additional place on the Russian roster with his quarterfinal triumph at the 2016 AIBA World Qualifying Tournament in Baku, Azerbaijan. All of the boxers were cleared for competition one day prior to the opening ceremony. However, Tishchenko's final match and Nikitin's quarterfinal match became controversial, leading to the suspension of the referees in question, with many observers saying that Tishchenko's and Nikitin's opponents were robbed. Nikitin was forced to withdraw from his semifinal bout against Shakur Stevenson due to cuts he sustained in his previous bouts; he received a bronze medal.

On 8 December 2016 Misha Aloyan was found to have committed an anti-doping rule violation after testing positive for Tuaminoheptane, a specified stimulant, prohibited in-competition under S6 on the WADA Prohibited List, during an in-competition doping control on 21 August 2016. The results obtained by the athlete in the Rio 2016 Olympic Games were disqualified.

Men

Athlete	Event	Round of 32	Round of 16	Quarterfinals	Semifinals	Final	
Athlete	Event	Opposition Result	Opposition Result	Opposition Result	Opposition Result	Opposition Result	Rank
Vasily Yegorov	Light flyweight	Bye	Hernández (USA); L 0–3	did not advance			
Misha Aloyan	Flyweight	Bye	Konki (FRA); W 3–0	Ávila (COL); W 3–0	Hu Jg (CHN); W 3–0	Zoirov (UZB); L 0–3	DSQ
Vladimir Nikitin	Bantamweight	Warawara (VAN); W 3–0	Butdee (THA); W 2–1	Conlan (IRL); W 3–0	Stevenson (USA); L WO	Did not advance	3rd place, bronze medalist(s)
Adlan Abdurashidov	Lightweight	Katua (PNG); W 3–0	Benbaziz (ALG); L 0–3	did not advance			
Vitaly Dunaytsev	Light welterweight	Bye	Baatarsükh (MGL); W 3–0	Hu Qx (CHN); W 3–0	Gaibnazarov (UZB); L 1–2	Did not advance	3rd place, bronze medalist(s)
Andrey Zamkovoy	Welterweight	Okwiri (KEN); L 1–2	did not advance				
Artem Chebotarev	Middleweight	Bye	Shakhsuvarly (AZE); L 1–2	did not advance			
Petr Khamukov	Light heavyweight	Ramirez (VEN); L 1–2	did not advance				
Evgeny Tishchenko	Heavyweight	Bye	Nogueira (BRA); W 3–0	Russo (ITA); W 3–0	Tulaganov (UZB); W 3–0	Levit (KAZ); W 3–0	1st place, gold medalist(s)

Women

Athlete	Event	Round of 16	Quarterfinals	Semifinals	Final	
Athlete	Event	Opposition Result	Opposition Result	Opposition Result	Opposition Result	Rank
Anastasia Belyakova	Lightweight	Bye	Mayer (USA); W 2–0	Mossely (FRA); L TKO	Did not advance	3rd place, bronze medalist(s)
Yaroslava Yakushina	Middleweight	Chen N-c (TPE); W 3–0	Shields (USA); L 0–3	did not advance		

== Canoeing ==
=== Slalom ===
Russian canoeists have qualified a maximum of one boat in each of the following classes through the 2015 ICF Canoe Slalom World Championships. The slalom canoeing team, including four returning Olympians from London 2012, was selected to the Russian roster at the 2016 European Championships on 15 May 2016.

Athlete	Event	Preliminary						Semifinal		Final	
Athlete	Event	Run 1	Rank	Run 2	Rank	Best	Rank	Time	Rank	Time	Rank
Alexander Lipatov	Men's C-1	101.78	10	98.72	7	98.72	10 Q	104.69	13	did not advance	
Mikhail Kuznetsov; Dmitry Larionov	Men's C-2	167.26	12	107.39	5	107.39	8 Q	112.39	8 Q	106.70	6
Pavel Eigel	Men's K-1	96.72	15	88.57	4	88.57	6 Q	92.43	7 Q	92.62	9
Marta Kharitonova	Women's K-1	111.01	13	104.72	5	104.72	8 Q	160.39	15	did not advance	

=== Sprint ===
Russian canoeists have qualified a total of ten boats in each of the following distances for the Games through the 2015 ICF Canoe Sprint World Championships. Meanwhile, one additional boat was awarded to the Russian squad in men's K-1 1000 m by virtue of a top two national finish at the 2016 European Qualification Regatta in Duisburg, Germany. As a response to the "multiple positive cases" of doping by Belarus and Romania, two further spare boats were accepted by the Russian team to round out the roster size to ten.

A total of 14 sprint canoeists (11 men and 3 women) were named to the Russian roster for the Games on 15 July 2016, with Alexander Dyachenko and Yury Postrigay looking to defend their men's sprint kayak double title at the Rio regatta.

On 26 July 2016, the International Canoe Federation announced that five selected Russian sprint canoeists, namely Yelena Anyushina, Natalia Podolskaya, Alexander Dyachenko, Andrey Kraitor and Aleksey Korovashkov, had been implicated in the DPM benefiting from the state-sponsored doping program. As a result, the Russian entries in the men's C-1 200 m, men's C-2 1000 m, and men's K-2 200 m, along with the women's events (K-1 200 m, K-1 500 m, and K-2 500 m), were removed, with four of the quota places being provisionally re-allocated to the different NOCs – women's K-2 500 m to Austria, women's K-1 200 m to Germany, men's K-2 200 m to Sweden and men's C-1 200 m to Iran. Kraitor's decision was reconsidered and was allowed to compete a day before the opening of the Games.

Men

Athlete	Event	Heats		Semifinals		Final	
Athlete	Event	Time	Rank	Time	Rank	Time	Rank
Roman Anoshkin	K-1 1000 m	3:37.296	5 Q	3:34.833	1 FA	3:33.363	3rd place, bronze medalist(s)
Andrey Kraitor	С-1 200 m	39.985	1 Q	40.394	1 FA	40.105	6
Evgenii Lukantsov	K-1 200 m	35.245	4 Q	35.567	7 FB	37.482	14
Ilya Shtokalov	C-1 1000 m	4:02.626	3 Q	3:58.259	1 FA	4:00.963	3rd place, bronze medalist(s)
Ilya Shtokalov; Ilya Pervukhin	C-2 1000 m	3:43.105	3 Q	3:42.127	3 FA	3:46.776	5
Roman Anoshkin; Kirill Lyapunov; Vasily Pogreban; Oleg Zhestkov	K-4 1000 m	2:56.662	4 Q	3:01.065	4 FB	3:06.825	9

Women

Athlete	Event	Heats		Semifinals		Final	
Athlete	Event	Time	Rank	Time	Rank	Time	Rank
Elena Anyushina	K-1 500 m	1:52.597	3 Q	1:57.229	4 FB	1:57.202	9
Elena Anyushina; Kira Stepanova	K-2 500 m	1:45.906	5 Q	1:42.439	2 FA	1:46.319	5

Qualification Legend: FA = Qualify to final (medal); FB = Qualify to final B (non-medal)

== Cycling ==
=== Road ===
Russian riders qualified for the following quota places in the men's and women's Olympic road race by virtue of their top 15 final national ranking in the 2015 UCI Europe Tour (for men) and top 22 in the 2016 UCI World Ranking (for women). The road cycling team, highlighted by two-time bronze medalist Olga Zabelinskaya from London 2012, was named to the Olympic roster on 26 June 2016.

On 26 July 2016, UCI announced that three cyclists with previous bans had been withdrawn by ROC, these including Ilnur Zakarin, Olga Zabelinskaya and track rider Sergei Shilov. A further three unnamed riders were implicated in the 'disappearing positive methodology' uncovered by Richard McLaren's report into state-sanctioned doping. On 5 August 2016, the date of the Opening Ceremony, Zabelinskaya's, Shilov's and Zakarin's bans were reversed and they were cleared to compete.

Athlete	Event	Time	Rank
Sergey Chernetskiy	Men's road race	6:19:43	31
Pavel Kochetkov	Men's road race	6:22:23	38
Pavel Kochetkov	Men's time trial	1:20:07.59	28
Alexey Kurbatov	Men's road race	did not finish	
Olga Zabelinskaya	Women's road race	3:55:52	16
Olga Zabelinskaya	Women's time trial	44:31.97	2nd place, silver medalist(s)

=== Track ===
Following the completion of the 2016 UCI Track Cycling World Championships, Russian riders have accumulated spots in the men's team pursuit and women's team sprint. As a result of their place in the women's team sprint, Russia has assured its right to enter two riders in the women's sprint and keirin. Although Russia failed to earn a place in the men's team sprint, they managed to secure a single berth in the men's keirin and two more in the men's sprint, by virtue of their final individual UCI Olympic rankings in those events.

On 26 July 2016, UCI announced that three cyclists with previous bans had been withdrawn by ROC, these including track rider Sergei Shilov. A further three unnamed riders were implicated in the 'disappearing positive methodology' uncovered by Richard McLaren's report into state-sanctioned doping. The UCI confirmed that the men's pursuit team from which Shilov was excluded would be allowed to replace him only from the existing pool of accepted athletes. The following day, two further track cyclists, Kirill Sveshnikov and Dmitri Sokolov were named as implicated in the methodology, and withdrawn, placing the Russian entry in the men's team pursuit in doubt.

Sprint

Athlete	Event	Qualification		Round 1	Repechage 1	Round 2	Repechage 2	Quarterfinals	Semifinals	Final	
Athlete	Event	Time Speed (km/h)	Rank	Opposition Time Speed (km/h)	Opposition Time Speed (km/h)	Opposition Time Speed (km/h)	Opposition Time Speed (km/h)	Opposition Time Speed (km/h)	Opposition Time Speed (km/h)	Opposition Time Speed (km/h)	Rank
Denis Dmitriev	Men's sprint	9.774; 73.664	4 Q	Sarnecki (POL); W 10.141; 70.998	Bye	Webster (NZL); W 10.102; 71.273	Bye	Baugé (FRA); W 10.202, W 10.166	Kenny (GBR); W 10.139, L, L	Glaetzer (AUS); W 10.105, W 10.190	3rd place, bronze medalist(s)
Nikita Shurshin	Men's sprint	10.418; 69.111	26	did not advance							
Daria Shmeleva	Women's sprint	11.230; 64.113	22	did not advance							
Anastasia Voynova	Women's sprint	10.985; 65.543	11 Q	Morton (AUS); W 11.503; 62.592	Bye	Zhong Ts (CHN); W 11.271; 63.880	Bye	Ligtlee (NED); L, L	Did not advance	5th place final Zhong (CHN); Lee W S (HKG); Krupeckaitė (LTU); L	8

Team sprint

Athlete	Event	Qualification		Semifinals		Final	
Athlete	Event	Time Speed (km/h)	Rank	Opposition Time Speed (km/h)	Rank	Opposition Time Speed (km/h)	Rank
Daria Shmeleva; Anastasia Voynova	Women's team sprint	32.655; 55.121	2 Q	Canada; W 32.324; 55.686	2 Q	China; L 32.401; 55.553	2nd place, silver medalist(s)

Keirin

Athlete	Event	1st Round	Repechage	2nd Round	Final
Athlete	Event	Rank	Rank	Rank	Rank
Denis Dmitriev	Men's keirin	4 R	2	did not advance	
Daria Shmeleva	Women's keirin	3 R	2	did not advance	
Anastasia Voynova	Women's keirin	4 R	1 Q	3 Q	4

=== Mountain biking ===
Russia has qualified one mountain biker for the women's Olympic cross-country race, as a result of her nation's ninth-place finish in the UCI Olympic Ranking List of 25 May 2016. Due to the lack of eligible NOCs for Oceania on the list, the unused berth was added to the Russian mountain biking team as the next highest-ranked nation, not yet qualified, in the men's cross-country race. Beijing 2008 bronze medalist Irina Kalentieva and rookie Anton Sintsov were named to Russia's mountain biking team for the Games on 3 July 2016.

Athlete	Event	Time	Rank
Anton Sintsov	Men's cross-country	1:37:38	12
Irina Kalentieva	Women's cross-country	1:36:54	17

=== BMX ===
Russian riders qualified for one men's and one women's quota place for BMX at the Olympics, as a result of the nation's seventh-place finish for women in the UCI Olympic Ranking List and top four for men in the UCI BMX Individual Ranking List of 31 May 2016. The BMX riders were named to the Olympic roster on 3 June 2016.

Athlete	Event	Seeding		Quarterfinal		Semifinal		Final	
Athlete	Event	Result	Rank	Points	Rank	Points	Rank	Result	Rank
Evgeny Komarov	Men's BMX	36.958	30	16	6	did not advance			
Yaroslava Bondarenko	Women's BMX	35.682	11	—N/a		13	4 Q	36.017	5

== Diving ==
Russian divers qualified for the following individual and synchronized team spots at the Olympics through the 2015 FINA World Championships and 2016 FINA World Cup series. The diving team, headlined by London 2012 springboard champion Ilya Zakharov, was named to the Olympic roster at the Russian Championships in Penza on 11 June 2016. In regard to the doping scandal, the FINA federation cleared all Russian divers for competition.

Men

Athlete	Event	Preliminaries		Semifinals		Final	
Athlete	Event	Points	Rank	Points	Rank	Points	Rank
Evgeny Kuznetsov	3 m springboard	449.90	4 Q	468.35	3 Q	481.35	4
Ilya Zakharov	3 m springboard	389.90	18 Q	345.60	18	did not advance	
Viktor Minibaev	10 m platform	462.25	8 Q	474.10	6 Q	481.60	8
Nikita Shleikher	10 m platform	418.15	16 Q	415.75	17	did not advance	
Evgeny Kuznetsov; Ilya Zakharov	3 m synchronized springboard	—N/a				385.17	7
Viktor Minibaev; Nikita Shleikher	10 m synchronized platform	—N/a				417.57	7

Women

Athlete	Event	Preliminaries		Semifinals		Final	
Athlete	Event	Points	Rank	Points	Rank	Points	Rank
Nadezhda Bazhina	3 m springboard	252.00	26	did not advance			
Kristina Ilinykh	3 m springboard	304.05	15 Q	295.20	15	did not advance	
Ekaterina Petukhova	10 m platform	317.25	11 Q	259.50	18	did not advance	
Yulia Timoshinina	10 m platform	212.25	28	did not advance			

== Equestrian ==
Russia has fielded a composite squad of three riders into the Olympic team eventing by virtue of the following results in the individual FEI Olympic rankings: a top finish from Central & Eastern Europe and Central Asia, and two top nine finishes from the combined overall Olympic rankings. Two dressage riders have been added to the squad into the Olympic equestrian competition by virtue of a top two finish from Central & Eastern Europe in the individual FEI Olympic rankings. In regard to doping, on 4 August 2016, the IOC cleared all of the riders to participate in the competition.

=== Dressage ===
Athlete	Horse	Event	Grand Prix		Grand Prix Special		Grand Prix Freestyle		Overall	
Athlete	Horse	Event	Score	Rank	Score	Rank	Technical	Artistic	Score	Rank
Marina Aframeeva	Vosk	Individual	71.343	31	did not advance					
Inessa Merkulova	Mister X	Individual	75.800	14 Q	73.154	23	did not advance			

=== Eventing ===
Athlete	Horse	Event	Dressage		Cross-country			Jumping						Total	
Athlete	Horse	Event	Dressage		Cross-country			Qualifier			Final			Total	
Athlete	Horse	Event	Penalties	Rank	Penalties	Total	Rank	Penalties	Total	Rank	Penalties	Total	Rank	Penalties	Rank
Aleksandr Markov	Kurfurstin	Individual	48.90	39	Eliminated			did not advance							
Andrey Mitin	Gurza	Individual	59.90	62	Eliminated			did not advance							
Evgeniya Ovchinnikova	Orion	Individual	66.00	65	Withdrew			did not advance							
Aleksandr Markov; Andrey Mitin; Evgeniya Ovchinnikova	See above	Team	174.80	13	3000	3000	13	did not start			—N/a			3000	13

== Fencing ==
Russian fencers have qualified a full squad each in the men's team foil, women's team épée, and women's team sabre by virtue of their top 4 national finish in the FIE Olympic Team Rankings, while the men's épée team has claimed the spot as the highest ranking team from Europe outside the world's top four.

Meanwhile, 2012 Olympic bronze medalist Nikolay Kovalev and three-time Olympian Aleksey Yakimenko (men's sabre), along with women's foil fencers Inna Deriglazova and Aida Shanaeva, had claimed their individual spots on the Russian team by finishing among the top 14 in the FIE Adjusted Official Rankings.

The fencing team was officially named to the Olympic roster on 17 June 2016. In regard to the doping scandal, the International Fencing Federation, cleared all Russian fencers for competition.

Men

Athlete	Event	Round of 64	Round of 32	Round of 16	Quarterfinal	Semifinal	Final / BM	
Athlete	Event	Opposition Score	Opposition Score	Opposition Score	Opposition Score	Opposition Score	Opposition Score	Rank
Vadim Anokhin	Épée	Bye	Brinck-Croteau (CAN); W 15–14	Heinzer (SUI); L 7–15	did not advance			
Anton Avdeev	Épée	Bye	Verwijlen (NED); W 15–9	Minobe (JPN); L 12–15	did not advance			
Pavel Sukhov	Épée	Bye	Park S-y (KOR); L 11–15	did not advance				
Vadim Anokhin; Anton Avdeev; Sergey Khodos; Pavel Sukhov	Team épée	—N/a		Bye	Ukraine; L 32–45	Classification semifinal Switzerland; L 28–45	7th place final Venezuela; W 36–30	7
Artur Akhmatkhuzin	Foil	Bye	Chamley-Watson (USA); W 15–13	Massialas (USA); L 9–15	did not advance			
Aleksey Cheremisinov	Foil	Bye	Safin (RUS); L 10–15	did not advance				
Timur Safin	Foil	Bye	Cheremisinov (RUS); W 15–10	Davis (GBR); W 15–13	Chen (CHN); W 15–7	Garozzo (ITA); L 8–15	Kruse (GBR); W 15–13	3rd place, bronze medalist(s)
Artur Akhmatkhuzin; Aleksey Cheremisinov; Timur Safin	Team foil	—N/a			Great Britain; W 45–43	United States; W 45–41	France; W 45–41	1st place, gold medalist(s)
Nikolay Kovalev	Sabre	—N/a	Decsi (HUN); W 15–10	Montano (ITA); W 15–13	Kim J-h (KOR); L 10–15	did not advance		
Aleksey Yakimenko	Sabre	—N/a	Paskov (BUL); L 14–15	did not advance				

Women

Athlete	Event	Round of 64	Round of 32	Round of 16	Quarterfinal	Semifinal	Final / BM	
Athlete	Event	Opposition Score	Opposition Score	Opposition Score	Opposition Score	Opposition Score	Opposition Score	Rank
Violetta Kolobova	Épée	Bye	Choi I-j (KOR); L 12–15	did not advance				
Tatiana Logunova	Épée	Bye	Nakano (JPN); L 14–15	did not advance				
Lyubov Shutova	Épée	Bye	Kong (HKG); L 10–15	did not advance				
Violetta Kolobova; Tatiana Logunova; Lyubov Shutova; Olga Kochneva	Team épée	—N/a		Bye	France; W 44–41	Romania; L 31–45	Estonia; W 37–31	3rd place, bronze medalist(s)
Inna Deriglazova	Foil	Bye	Bulcão (BRA); W 15–6	Mohamed (HUN); W 15–6	Guyart (FRA); W 15–6	Shanaeva (RUS); W 15–3	Di Francisca (ITA); W 12–11	1st place, gold medalist(s)
Aida Shanaeva	Foil	Bye	Rochel (BRA); W 15–13	Jeon H-s (KOR); W 15–11	Thibus (FRA); W 15–13	Deriglazova (RUS); L 3–15	Boubakri (TUN); L 11–15	4
Yekaterina Dyachenko	Sabre	Bye	Seo J-y (KOR); W 15–12	Zagunis (USA); W 15–12	Egorian (RUS); L 10–15	did not advance		
Yana Egorian	Sabre	Bye	Arrayales (MEX); W 15–7	Vougiouka (GRE); W 15–11	Dyachenko (RUS); W 15–10	Kharlan (UKR); W 15–9	Velikaya (RUS); W 15–14	1st place, gold medalist(s)
Sofiya Velikaya	Sabre	Bye	Jóźwiak (POL); W 15–5	Lembach (FRA); W 15–14	Berder (FRA); W 15–10	Brunet (FRA); W 15–14	Egorian (RUS); L 14–15	2nd place, silver medalist(s)
Yekaterina Dyachenko; Yana Egorian; Yuliya Gavrilova; Sofiya Velikaya	Team sabre	—N/a			Mexico; W 45–31	United States; W 45–42	Ukraine; W 45–30	1st place, gold medalist(s)

== Golf ==
Russia has entered one golfer into the Olympic tournament. Maria Verchenova (world no. 338) qualified directly among the top 60 eligible players for their respective individual events based on the IGF World Rankings as of 11 July 2016. On 4 August 2016, Verchenova was cleared to participate in the competition.

Athlete	Event	Round 1	Round 2	Round 3	Round 4	Total		
Athlete	Event	Score	Score	Score	Score	Score	Par	Rank
Maria Verchenova	Women's	75	70	73	62	280	−4	=16

== Gymnastics ==
=== Artistic ===
Russia fielded a full squad of five gymnasts in both the men's and women's artistic gymnastics events through a top eight finish each in the team all-around at the 2015 World Artistic Gymnastics Championships in Glasgow. The men's and women's gymnastics squads, led by London 2012 uneven bars champion Aliya Mustafina and bronze medalists Denis Ablyazin and Maria Paseka, were named to the Olympic roster at the Russian Cup in Penza on 3 July 2016. The International Federation of Gymnastics cleared all Russian gymnasts to compete.

Men
Team

Athlete	Event	Qualification								Final							
Athlete	Event	Apparatus						Total	Rank	Apparatus						Total	Rank
Athlete	Event	F	PH	R	V	PB	HB	Total	Rank	F	PH	R	V	PB	HB	Total	Rank
Denis Ablyazin	Team	14.700	—N/a	15.633 Q	15.400 Q	—N/a				15.100	—N/a	15.700	15.600	—N/a		—N/a	
David Belyavskiy	Team	14.600	15.300 Q	14.533	14.900	15.933 Q	14.533	89.799	3 Q	14.666	15.500	—N/a	15.033	15.800	14.958	—N/a	
Nikolai Kuksenkov	Team	14.666	15.383 Q	14.433	14.900	15.366	14.100	88.848	9 Q	—N/a	15.033	14.866	—N/a	15.133	14.166	—N/a	
Nikita Nagornyy	Team	14.066	14.541	14.900	15.266 Q	13.133	12.733	84.639	28	15.000	—N/a	14.866	15.400	—N/a		—N/a	
Ivan Stretovich	Team	—N/a	14.566	—N/a		15.200	14.633	—N/a		—N/a	14.766	—N/a		15.100	14.766	—N/a	
Total	Team	43.966	45.249	45.066	45.566	46.499	43.266	269.612	3 Q	44.766	45.299	45.432	46.033	46.033	43.890	271.453	2nd place, silver medalist(s)

Individual finals

Athlete	Event	Apparatus						Total	Rank
Athlete	Event	F	PH	R	V	PB	HB	Total	Rank
Denis Ablyazin	Rings	—N/a		15.700	—N/a			15.700	3rd place, bronze medalist(s)
Denis Ablyazin	Vault	—N/a			15.516	—N/a		15.516	2nd place, silver medalist(s)
David Belyavskiy	All-around	15.000	14.766	14.533	15.133	15.933	15.133	90.498	4
David Belyavskiy	Pommel horse	—N/a	15.400	—N/a				15.400	5
David Belyavskiy	Parallel bars	—N/a				15.783	—N/a	15.783	3rd place, bronze medalist(s)
Nikolai Kuksenkov	All-around	14.733	13.300	14.700	14.966	15.233	14.800	87.732	13
Nikolai Kuksenkov	Pommel horse	—N/a	15.233	—N/a				15.233	6
Nikita Nagornyy	Vault	—N/a			15.316	—N/a		15.316	5

Women
Team

Athlete	Event	Qualification						Final					
Athlete	Event	Apparatus				Total	Rank	Apparatus				Total	Rank
Athlete	Event	V	UB	BB	F	Total	Rank	V	UB	BB	F	Total	Rank
Angelina Melnikova	Team	14.933	15.100	13.266	13.200	56.499	22	14.900	15.133	13.033	14.266	—N/a	
Aliya Mustafina	Team	15.166	15.833 Q	13.033	14.066	58.098	6 Q	15.133	15.933	14.958	14.000	—N/a	
Maria Paseka	Team	14.733 Q	—N/a					15.700	—N/a			—N/a	
Daria Spiridonova	Team	—N/a	15.683 Q	14.266	12.033	—N/a		—N/a	15.100	—N/a		—N/a	
Seda Tutkhalyan	Team	14.733	15.133	14.466	13.875	58.207	5 Q	—N/a		14.766	13.766	—N/a	
Total	Team	44.832	46.649	41.998	41.141	174.620	3 Q	45.733	46.166	42.757	42.032	176.688	2nd place, silver medalist(s)

Individual finals

Athlete	Event	Apparatus				Total	Rank
Athlete	Event	V	UB	BB	F	Total	Rank
Aliya Mustafina	All-around	15.200	15.666	13.866	13.933	58.665	3rd place, bronze medalist(s)
Aliya Mustafina	Uneven bars	—N/a	15.900	—N/a		15.900	1st place, gold medalist(s)
Maria Paseka	Vault	15.253	—N/a			15.253	2nd place, silver medalist(s)
Daria Spiridonova	Uneven bars	—N/a	13.966	—N/a		13.966	8
Seda Tutkhalyan	All-around	14.866	15.033	13.800	10.966	54.665	22

=== Rhythmic ===
Russia has qualified a squad of rhythmic gymnasts for the individual and group all-around by finishing in the top 15 (for individual) and top 10 (for group) at the 2015 World Championships in Stuttgart, Germany. The rhythmic gymnastics squad was named on 24 July 2016, following the IOC's decision against a total blanket ban on the Russian Olympic team.

Athlete	Event	Qualification						Final					
Athlete	Event	Hoop	Ball	Clubs	Ribbon	Total	Rank	Hoop	Ball	Clubs	Ribbon	Total	Rank
Yana Kudryavtseva	Individual	18.166	18.616	19.000	18.216	73.998	2 Q	19.225	19.250	17.883	19.250	75.608	2nd place, silver medalist(s)
Margarita Mamun	Individual	18.833	19.000	17.500	19.050	74.383	1 Q	19.050	19.150	19.050	19.233	76.483	1st place, gold medalist(s)

Athlete	Event	Qualification				Final			
Athlete	Event	5 ribbons	3 clubs 2 hoops	Total	Rank	5 ribbons	3 clubs 2 hoops	Total	Rank
Vera Biryukova; Anastasia Bliznyuk; Anastasia Maksimova; Anastasiia Tatareva; Maria Tolkacheva	Team	18.283	17.233	35.516	2 Q	17.600	18.633	36.233	1st place, gold medalist(s)

=== Trampoline ===
Russia has qualified two gymnasts in the men's trampoline by virtue of a top eight finish at the 2015 World Championships in Odense, Denmark. Meanwhile, an additional Olympic berth had been awarded to the Russian female gymnast, who finished in the top six at the 2016 Olympic Test Event in Rio de Janeiro.

Athlete	Event	Qualification		Final	
Athlete	Event	Score	Rank	Score	Rank
Dmitry Ushakov	Men's	109.180	4 Q	59.525	5
Andrey Yudin	Men's	108.725	5 Q	6.815	8
Yana Pavlova	Women's	98.060	9	did not advance	

== Handball ==
Summary

Key:

- ET: After extra time
- P – Match decided by penalty-shootout.

Team	Event	Group Stage						Quarterfinal	Semifinal	Final / BM	
Team	Event	Opposition Score	Opposition Score	Opposition Score	Opposition Score	Opposition Score	Rank	Opposition Score	Opposition Score	Opposition Score	Rank
Russia women's	Women's tournament	South Korea; W 30–25	France; W 26–25	Sweden; W 36–34	Argentina; W 35–29	Netherlands; W 38–34	1	Angola; W 31–27	Norway; W 38–37^{ET}	France; W 22–19	1st place, gold medalist(s)

=== Women's tournament ===
Russia women's handball team qualified for the Olympics by virtue of a top two finish at the third meet of the Olympic Qualification Tournament in Astrakhan. Russia women's handball team qualified for the Olympics by virtue of a top two finish at the third meet of the Olympic Qualification Tournament in Astrakhan. On 28 July 2016 it was announced that the International Handball Federation (IHF) cleared the entire team to compete in Rio de Janeiro.

Team roster

The following is the Russian roster in the women's handball tournament of the 2016 Summer Olympics. On 12 August, Tatyana Yerokhina was added to the squad after Anna Sedoykina was ruled out for the test of the tournament due to an injury.

Head coach: Yevgeni Trefilov

No.	Pos.	Name	Date of birth (age)	Height	App.	Goals	Club
1	GK	Anna Sedoykina	1 August 1984 (aged 32)	1.81 m	128	4	(Russia) Rostov-Don
2	LW	Polina Kuznetsova	10 June 1987 (aged 29)	1.70 m	119	322	(Russia) Kuban Krasnodar
7	CB	Daria Dmitrieva	9 August 1995 (aged 20)	1.78 m	43	92	(Russia) Lada Togliatti
8	LB	Anna Sen	3 February 1990 (aged 26)	1.85 m	93	222	(Russia) Rostov-Don
10	LB	Olga Akopyan	4 March 1985 (aged 31)	1.76 m	133	367	(Russia) Lada Togliatti
13	RW	Anna Vyakhireva	13 March 1995 (aged 21)	1.62 m	37	165	(Russia) Rostov-Don
15	RW	Marina Sudakova	17 February 1989 (aged 27)	1.66 m	38	56	(Russia) Kuban Krasnodar
17	LB	Vladlena Bobrovnikova	24 October 1987 (aged 28)	1.80 m	36	69	(Russia) Rostov-Don
21	LB	Victoria Zhilinskayte	6 March 1989 (aged 27)	1.88 m	110	159	(Russia) Kuban Krasnodar
22	LW	Yekaterina Marennikova	29 April 1982 (aged 34)	1.79 m	120	260	(Russia) Kuban Krasnodar
24	RB	Irina Bliznova	6 October 1986 (aged 29)	1.82 m	124	369	(Russia) Lada Togliatti
33	CB	Ekaterina Ilina	7 March 1991 (aged 25)	1.75 m	68	187	(Russia) Rostov-Don
77	P	Maya Petrova	26 May 1982 (aged 34)	1.84 m	55	82	(Russia) Rostov-Don
84	GK	Tatyana Yerokhina	7 September 1984 (aged 31)	1.85 m	21	0	(Russia) Lada Togliatti
88	GK	Victoriya Kalinina	8 December 1988 (aged 27)	1.83 m	39	0	(Russia) Kuban Krasnodar

Group play

Pos	Team	Pld	W	D	L	GF	GA	GD	Pts	Qualification
1	Russia	5	5	0	0	165	147	+18	10	Quarter-finals
2	France	5	4	0	1	118	93	+25	8	Quarter-finals
3	Sweden	5	2	1	2	150	141	+9	5	Quarter-finals
4	Netherlands	5	1	2	2	135	135	0	4	Quarter-finals
5	South Korea	5	1	1	3	130	136	−6	3	
6	Argentina	5	0	0	5	101	147	−46	0	

Source: IHF
Rules for classification: 1) Points; 2) Head-to-head points; 3) Head-to-head goal difference; 4) Head-to-head goals scored; 5) Goal difference; 6) Goals scored; 7) Draw.

6 August 2016; 14:40	Russia	30–25	South Korea	Future Arena, Rio de Janeiro; Referees: Santos, Fonseca (POR)
6 August 2016; 14:40	Sudakova 6	(12–13)	Jung, Kim O. 6	Future Arena, Rio de Janeiro; Referees: Santos, Fonseca (POR)
6 August 2016; 14:40	3× (yellow card) 3× (suspension)	Report	4× (yellow card) 7× (suspension) 1× (red card)	Future Arena, Rio de Janeiro; Referees: Santos, Fonseca (POR)

8 August 2016; 11:30	France	25–26	Russia	Future Arena, Rio de Janeiro; Referees: Lah, Sok (SLO)
8 August 2016; 11:30	Lacrabère 11	(10–15)	Kuznetsova 6	Future Arena, Rio de Janeiro; Referees: Lah, Sok (SLO)
8 August 2016; 11:30	3× (yellow card) 6× (suspension)	Report	4× (yellow card) 4× (suspension)	Future Arena, Rio de Janeiro; Referees: Lah, Sok (SLO)

10 August 2016; 14:40	Russia	36–34	Sweden	Future Arena, Rio de Janeiro; Referees: Pinto, Menezes (BRA)
10 August 2016; 14:40	Bobrovnikova, Dmitriyeva 6	(15–18)	Gulldén 11	Future Arena, Rio de Janeiro; Referees: Pinto, Menezes (BRA)
10 August 2016; 14:40	4× (yellow card) 3× (suspension) 1× (red card)	Report	3× (yellow card) 6× (suspension) 1× (red card)	Future Arena, Rio de Janeiro; Referees: Pinto, Menezes (BRA)

12 August 2016; 19:50	Russia	35–29	Argentina	Future Arena, Rio de Janeiro; Referees: Mousaviyan, Kolahdouzan (IRI)
12 August 2016; 19:50	Vyakhireva 7	(20–18)	Pizzo 6	Future Arena, Rio de Janeiro; Referees: Mousaviyan, Kolahdouzan (IRI)
12 August 2016; 19:50	3× (yellow card) 11× (suspension) 1× (red card)	Report	4× (yellow card) 7× (suspension)	Future Arena, Rio de Janeiro; Referees: Mousaviyan, Kolahdouzan (IRI)

14 August 2016; 14:40	Netherlands	34–38	Russia	Future Arena, Rio de Janeiro; Referees: Lah, Sok (SLO)
14 August 2016; 14:40	Polman 12	(16–17)	Ilina 8	Future Arena, Rio de Janeiro; Referees: Lah, Sok (SLO)
14 August 2016; 14:40	3× (yellow card) 6× (suspension)	Report	2× (yellow card) 4× (suspension)	Future Arena, Rio de Janeiro; Referees: Lah, Sok (SLO)

Quarterfinal

16 August 2016; 20:30	Russia	31–27	Angola	Future Arena, Rio de Janeiro; Referees: Pinto, Menezes (BRA)
16 August 2016; 20:30	Kuznetsova 5	(18–14)	Bernardo 8	Future Arena, Rio de Janeiro; Referees: Pinto, Menezes (BRA)
16 August 2016; 20:30	2× (yellow card) 5× (suspension) 1× (red card)	Report	3× (yellow card) 4× (suspension)	Future Arena, Rio de Janeiro; Referees: Pinto, Menezes (BRA)

Semifinal

18 August 2016
20:30
Norway
37–38 (ET)
Russia
Future Arena, Rio de Janeiro
Referees: Lah, Sok (SLO)
Mørk 14
(16–18)
Bobrovnikova 8
3× (yellow card) 7× (suspension)
Report
4× (yellow card) 5× (suspension)

FT: 31–31 ET: 6–7

Gold medal match

20 August 2016; 15:30	France	19–22	Russia	Future Arena, Rio de Janeiro; Referees: Røen, Arntsen (NOR)
20 August 2016; 15:30	Dembélé, Pineau 5	(7–10)	Vyakhireva 5	Future Arena, Rio de Janeiro; Referees: Røen, Arntsen (NOR)
20 August 2016; 15:30	2× (yellow card) 1× (suspension)	Report	3× (yellow card) 2× (suspension)	Future Arena, Rio de Janeiro; Referees: Røen, Arntsen (NOR)

== Judo ==
Russia has qualified a total of eleven judokas (seven men and four women) for each of the following weight classes at the Games by virtue of their top 22 national finish for men and top 14 for women in the International Judo Federation (IJF) World Ranking List of 30 May 2016. Seven members of the Russian judo team were named to the Olympic roster on 31 May, with four more rounding out the lineup under the federation selection based on IOC requirements on 26 June 2016.

On 4 August 2016, the entire team was cleared to participate in the Olympics.

Men

Athlete	Event	Round of 64	Round of 32	Round of 16	Quarterfinals	Semifinals	Repechage	Final / BM	
Athlete	Event	Opposition Result	Opposition Result	Opposition Result	Opposition Result	Opposition Result	Opposition Result	Opposition Result	Rank
Beslan Mudranov	−60 kg	Bye	Mooren (NED); W 002–000	Davtyan (ARM); W 001–000	Kim W-j (KOR); W 100–000	Papinashvili (GEO); W 100–000	Bye	Smetov (KAZ); W 010–000	1st place, gold medalist(s)
Mikhail Pulyaev	−66 kg	Bye	Bouchard (CAN); L 000–001	did not advance					
Denis Yartsev	−73 kg	Bye	Duprat (FRA); W 001–000	Sai Yj (CHN); W 100–000	van Tichelt (BEL); L 010–011	Did not advance	Shavdatuashvili (GEO); L 000–100	Did not advance	7
Khasan Khalmurzaev	−81 kg	—N/a	Mollaei (IRN); W 000–000 S	Abdelaal (EGY); W 010–000	Valois-Fortier (CAN); W 010–000	Toma (UAE); W 100–000	Bye	Stevens (USA); W 100–000	1st place, gold medalist(s)
Kirill Denisov	−90 kg	Bye	Mehdiyev (AZE); L 000–100	did not advance					
Tagir Khaibulaev	−100 kg	Bye	Gasimov (AZE); L 000–011	did not advance					
Renat Saidov	+100 kg	—N/a	Allerstorfer (AUT); W 001–000	R Silva (BRA); L 000–100	did not advance				

Women

Athlete	Event	Round of 32	Round of 16	Quarterfinals	Semifinals	Repechage	Final / BM	
Athlete	Event	Opposition Result	Opposition Result	Opposition Result	Opposition Result	Opposition Result	Opposition Result	Rank
Irina Dolgova	−48 kg	Kim S-m (PRK); W 010–000	Pareto (ARG); L 000–102	did not advance				
Natalia Kuziutina	−52 kg	Bye	Guica (CAN); W 002–000	Nakamura (JPN); L 000–100	Did not advance	Legentil (MRI); W 100–000	Ma Yn (CHN); W 100–000	3rd place, bronze medalist(s)
Irina Zabludina	−57 kg	Manuel (NZL); L 000–001	did not advance					
Ekaterina Valkova	−63 kg	van Emden (NED); L 000–000 S	did not advance					
Ksenia Chibisova	+78 kg	Külbs (GER); W 101–000	Ortiz (CUB); L 000–100	did not advance				

== Modern pentathlon ==
Russia has qualified a total of four modern pentathletes for the following events at the Games. Aleksander Lesun and Donata Rimšaitė had claimed one of three available Olympic quota places each in the men's and women's event at the 2015 World Championships in Berlin, Germany, while Egor Puchkarevskiy and Gulnaz Guybaidullina added a second spot each to the full roster through the European Championships. Maksim Kustov became the third Russian to qualify for the men's event in Rio, as a result of his world ranking as of 31 May 2016, leading to his selection to the Olympic team instead of Puchkarevskiy.

On 26 July 2016, Maksim Kustov was named as one of the athletes implicated in the 'disappearing positive methodology' as part of the McClaren Report on Russian state-sponsored doping, and excluded from the games, along with reserve Ilia Frolov. Because of this doping issue, The UIPM decided to revoke the quota place held by Kustov and thereby awarded it to Ruslan Nakoņečnijs of Latvia.

Athlete	Event	Fencing (épée one touch)				Swimming (200 m freestyle)			Riding (show jumping)			Combined: shooting/running (10 m air pistol)/(3200 m)			Total points	Final rank
Athlete	Event	RR	BR	Rank	MP points	Time	Rank	MP points	Penalties	Rank	MP points	Time	Rank	MP Points	Total points	Final rank
Aleksander Lesun	Men's	28–7	0	1	268 OR	2:05.58	22	324	21	21	279	11:32.35	20	608	1479	1st place, gold medalist(s)
Gulnaz Gubaydullina	Women's	8–27	0	36	148	2:07.94 OR	1	317	10	15	290	12:30.76	5	550	1305	15
Donata Rimšaitė	Women's	17–18	0	17	202	2:22.09	30	274	16	19	284	12:32.67	6	548	1308	12

== Rowing ==
Russia had qualified a total of six boats for each of the following rowing classes into the Olympic regatta. Four rowing crews had confirmed Olympic places for their boats in the women's lightweight double sculls and large-boat classes (men's four, men's & women's eight) at the 2015 FISA World Championships in Lac d'Aiguebelette, France, while rowers competing in the men's lightweight four and quadruple sculls were further added to the Russian roster with their top two finish at the 2016 European & Final Qualification Regatta in Lucerne, Switzerland.

A total of 32 rowers (21 men and 11 women) were named to the Olympic roster on 13 June 2016, with Athens 2004 gold medalist Sergey Fedorovtsev leading the quadruple sculls crew at his fourth straight Games. On 1 July 2016, Fedorovtsev and his men's quadruple sculls crew were disqualified from the Games for failing an off-season doping test on the former's banned substance trimetazidine, cutting the rowing team size to 28.

On 25 July 2016, the International Rowing Federation (FISA) announced the first stage of its decision on Russian eligibility, following the decision of the International Olympic Committee in relation to the nation's athletes for the Games. According to the decision issued by the IOC on the previous day, FISA declared that one registered rower, Ivan Balandin, who had been implicated in the 'disappearing positive methodology', was ineligible to compete and could not be replaced. Two more rowers, namely Anastasiia Karabelshchikova and Ivan Podshivalov, were ruled ineligible by reason of previous bans. While the qualified rowers may be moved to the affected boats, the decision placed the entry of the women's eight in doubt, as Russia will only have seven qualified rowers in the open weight category.

The following day, FISA announced the second stage of its decision on Russian eligibility. Having considered the 'international' doping record of the remaining Russian rowers, others had evidently committed doping offences; thus, FISA could not be confident that all but six rowers entered by ROC had undergone sufficient international testing. As such, FISA could only accept entries from six rowers, including one lightweight four, namely Aleksandr Chaukin, Georgy Efremenko, Artyom Kosov, Nikita Morgachyov, Vladislav Ryabtsev and Anton Zarutskiy. No other rowers were sufficiently qualified to fill any of the boats, except the men's coxless four. FISA indicated that it was seeking clarification from Russian rowing as to whether they intended to take such place in the Games. On 31 July 2016, FISA confirmed that the Russian team had accepted he invitation to field a men's coxless four, manned by four of the six cleared rowers; Anton Zarutskiy, Artyom Kosov, Vladislav Ryabtsev and Nikita Morgachyov.

Consequently, out of the original 28 rowers named to the official Olympic roster only 6 were allowed to compete in the Olympics. Forfeited quota places were provisionally awarded to Greece (men's lightweight four), Italy (men's eight and women's lightweight double sculls), and Australia (women's eight). All three nations accepted their invitations. On 3 August 2016, the Court of Arbitration for Sport rejected a final appeal by seventeen of the excluded rowers, confirming the single boat for Russia at the Games.

Athlete	Event	Heats		Repechage		Semifinals		Final	
Athlete	Event	Time	Rank	Time	Rank	Time	Rank	Time	Rank
Artyom Kosov; Nikita Morgachyov; Vladislav Ryabtsev; Anton Zarutskiy	Men's four	6:03.89	5 R	6:39.32	3 SA/B	6:24.89	6 FB	6:02.09	10

Qualification Legend: FA=Final A (medal); FB=Final B (non-medal); FC=Final C (non-medal); FD=Final D (non-medal); FE=Final E (non-medal); FF=Final F (non-medal); SA/B=Semifinals A/B; SC/D=Semifinals C/D; SE/F=Semifinals E/F; QF=Quarterfinals; R=Repechage

== Sailing ==
Russian sailors have qualified one boat in each of the following classes through the 2014 ISAF Sailing World Championships, the individual fleet Worlds, and European qualifying regattas. Following the completion of the Princess Sofia Trophy Regatta, the entire Russian sailing team was announced on 2 April 2016, with former Ukrainian windsurfer Maksym Oberemko aiming to appear at his sixth Olympics under a new banner.

On 26 July 2016, World Sailing announced that 470 sailor Pavel Sozykin was deemed ineligible, as a result of his implication in the McClaren Report on Russian state-sponsored doping allegations. On 4 August 2016, Sozykin's removal was reversed and all five sailors were cleared to participate.

Hence, six named sailors were eligible to compete, pending confirmation by a CAS arbitrator in line with the procedures set out on 24 July by IOC.

Men

Athlete	Event	Race													Net points	Final rank
Athlete	Event	1	2	3	4	5	6	7	8	9	10	11	12	M*	Net points	Final rank
Maksym Oberemko	RS:X	~~27~~	25	14	24	17	13	3	3	10	8	13	9	EL	139	16
Sergey Komissarov	Laser	2	9	19	23	7	10	16	~~31~~	28	15	—N/a		EL	129	15
Denis Gribanov; Pavel Sozykin	470	12	17	7	~~25~~	5	21	18	3	16	19	—N/a		EL	118	14

Women

Athlete	Event	Race													Net points	Final rank
Athlete	Event	1	2	3	4	5	6	7	8	9	10	11	12	M*	Net points	Final rank
Stefania Elfutina	RS:X	2	5	3	6	2	9	8	4	6	3	~~16~~	7	14	69	3rd place, bronze medalist(s)
Liudmila Dmitrieva; Alisa Kirilyuk	470	~~UFD~~; ~~21~~	DSQ; 21	6	9	11	7	18	10	14	11	—N/a		EL	107	14

M = Medal race; EL = Eliminated – did not advance into the medal race

== Shooting ==
Russian shooters have achieved quota places for the following events by virtue of their best finishes at the 2014 and 2015 International Shooting Sport Federation (ISSF) World Championships, the 2015 ISSF World Cup series, and European Championships or Games, as long as they obtained a minimum qualifying score (MQS) by 31 March 2016.

On 26 July 2016, the ISSF approved the entire 18 athlete team to participate in the Olympics. On 4 August 2016, the IOC confirmed the ruling and cleared all of the shooters to participate.

Men

Athlete	Event	Qualification		Semifinal		Final	
Athlete	Event	Points	Rank	Points	Rank	Points	Rank
Alexey Alipov	Trap	117	7	did not advance			
Anton Astakhov	Skeet	119	12	did not advance			
Vitaly Fokeev	Double trap	133	11	did not advance			
Vladimir Gontcharov	10 m air pistol	580	8 Q	—N/a		98.9	7
Vladimir Gontcharov	50 m pistol	557	4 Q	—N/a		111.0	6
Kirill Grigoryan	50 m rifle prone	628.9	2 Q	—N/a		187.3	3rd place, bronze medalist(s)
Vladimir Isakov	10 m air pistol	574	31	—N/a		did not advance	
Sergey Kamenskiy	10 m air rifle	623.2	16	—N/a		did not advance	
Sergey Kamenskiy	50 m rifle prone	629.0 OR	1 Q	—N/a		165.8	4
Sergey Kamenskiy	50 m rifle 3 positions	1184	1 Q	—N/a		458.5	2nd place, silver medalist(s)
Alexei Klimov	25 m rapid fire pistol	581	9	—N/a		did not advance	
Denis Kulakov	50 m pistol	548	23	—N/a		did not advance	
Vladimir Maslennikov	10 m air rifle	629.0	2 Q	—N/a		184.2	3rd place, bronze medalist(s)
Vasily Mosin	Double trap	132	13	did not advance			
Fedor Vlasov	50 m rifle 3 positions	1176	6 Q	—N/a		403.1	7

Women

Athlete	Event	Qualification		Semifinal		Final	
Athlete	Event	Points	Rank	Points	Rank	Points	Rank
Tatiana Barsuk	Trap	62	18	did not advance			
Vitalina Batsarashkina	10 m air pistol	390	1 Q	—N/a		197.1	2nd place, silver medalist(s)
Vitalina Batsarashkina	25 m pistol	578	13	did not advance			
Ekaterina Korshunova	10 m air pistol	387	2 Q	—N/a		73.5	8
Ekaterina Korshunova	25 m pistol	582	8 Q	16	5	did not advance	
Ekaterina Rabaya	Trap	65	11	did not advance			
Albina Shakirova	Skeet	69	7	did not advance			
Daria Vdovina	10 m air rifle	417.4	4 Q	—N/a		143.5	5
Daria Vdovina	50 m rifle 3 positions	579	15	—N/a		did not advance	

Qualification Legend: Q = Qualify for the next round; q = Qualify for the bronze medal (shotgun)

== Swimming ==
Russian swimmers have so far achieved qualifying standards in the following events (up to a maximum of 2 swimmers in each event at the Olympic Qualifying Time (OQT), and potentially 1 at the Olympic Selection Time (OST)): To assure their selection to the Olympic team, swimmers must finish in the top two of each individual event with the federation's corresponding standard slightly faster than the FINA A-cut at the Russian Championships & Olympic Trials ( 16 to 23 April) in Moscow.

A total of 37 swimmers (24 men and 13 women) were selected to the Russian roster for the Olympics, including London 2012 medalists Anastasia Valeryevna Zuyeva, Yuliya Yefimova, and Vladimir Morozov, and 2014 Youth Olympic backstroke champion Evgeny Rylov.

On 25 July 2016, FINA, following the guidelines set out by the International Olympic Committee, announced that seven swimmers declared by the Russian Olympic Committee for the Rio games were deemed ineligible – four, Mikhail Dovgalyuk, Yuliya Yefimova, Nataliya Lovtsova and Anastasiya Krapyvina, because of previous doping bans, and three, Nikita Lobintsev, Vladimir Morozov and Daria Ustinova, because of being implicated in the 'disappearing positive methodology' uncovered by the McClaren report. The status of relay teams involving these ineligible swimmers remained unclear. On 4 August 2016, Morozov and Lobintsev were reported to be cleared for participation by the IOC. On 5 August 2016, the date of the opening ceremony, Yuliya Yefimova, Natalya Lovtsova, Daria Ustinova, Mikhail Dovgalyuk, and Anastasiya Krapyvina were cleared for participation. Consequently, all of the declared Russian swimmers were allowed to participate.

Men

Athlete	Event	Heat		Semifinal		Final	
Athlete	Event	Time	Rank	Time	Rank	Time	Rank
Vyacheslav Andrushenko	400 m freestyle	3:50.23	30	—N/a		did not advance	
Aleksei Brianskiy	50 m freestyle	22.33	28	did not advance			
Anton Chupkov	200 m breaststroke	2:07.93 NR	1 Q	2:08.08	6 Q	2:07.70 NR	3rd place, bronze medalist(s)
Evgeny Drattsev	10 km open water	—N/a				1:53:04.8	11
Ilya Druzhinin	1500 m freestyle	14:59.56	13	—N/a		did not advance	
Andrey Grechin	100 m freestyle	48.75	21	did not advance			
Ilya Khomenko	200 m breaststroke	2:08.94	4 Q	2:09.73	10	did not advance	
Evgeny Koptelov	100 m butterfly	52.01	15 Q	52.50	16	did not advance	
Evgeny Koptelov	200 m butterfly	1:56.13	11 Q	1:56.46	11	did not advance	
Alexander Krasnykh	200 m freestyle	1:47.15	16 Q	1:45.69	4 Q	1:45.91	8
Alexander Krasnykh	400 m freestyle	3:47.39	15	—N/a		did not advance	
Nikita Lobintsev	200 m freestyle	1:49.35	36	did not advance			
Semen Makovich	200 m individual medley	1:59.86	18	did not advance			
Vladimir Morozov	50 m freestyle	21.81	6 Q	21.88	10	did not advance	
Vladimir Morozov	100 m freestyle	48.39	8 Q	48.26	9	did not advance	
Daniil Pakhomov	200 m butterfly	1:57.36	24	did not advance			
Yaroslav Potapov	1500 m freestyle	15:00.99	14	—N/a		did not advance	
Kirill Prigoda	100 m breaststroke	1:00.37	20	did not advance			
Evgeny Rylov	100 m backstroke	53.25	6 Q	52.84	6 Q	52.74	6
Evgeny Rylov	200 m backstroke	1:55.02	1 Q	1:54.45	1 Q	1:53.97	3rd place, bronze medalist(s)
Aleksandr Sadovnikov	100 m butterfly	51.91	13 Q	51.71	7 Q	51.84	8
Andrey Shabasov	200 m backstroke	1:56.50	6 Q	1:56.84	12	did not advance	
Grigoriy Tarasevich	100 m backstroke	53.65	11 Q	53.46	9	did not advance	
Vsevolod Zanko	100 m breaststroke	59.91	13 Q	1:00.39	14	did not advance	
Andrey Grechin; Danila Izotov; Vladimir Morozov; Alexander Popkov*; Alexander Sukhorukov	4 × 100 m freestyle relay	3:12.04	1 Q	—N/a		3:11.64	4
Vyacheslav Andrushenko; Mikhail Dovgalyuk; Danila Izotov; Alexander Krasnykh; Nikita Lobintsev	4 × 200 m freestyle relay	7:06.81	3 Q	—N/a		7:05.70	5
Anton Chupkov; Evgeny Koptelov; Vladimir Morozov; Evgeny Rylov; Aleksandr Sadovnikov; Alexander Sukhorukov; Grigoriy Tarasevich	4 × 100 m medley relay	3:32.95	6 Q	—N/a		3:31.30	4

Women

Athlete	Event	Heat		Semifinal		Final	
Athlete	Event	Time	Rank	Time	Rank	Time	Rank
Sofiya Andreeva	200 m breaststroke	2:26.58	16 Q	2:25.90	15	did not advance	
Viktoriya Andreeva	200 m individual medley	2:13.01	16 Q	2:10.87	8 Q	2:12.28	7
Svetlana Chimrova	100 m butterfly	58.41	19	did not advance			
Daria Chikunova	100 m breaststroke	1:09.12	28	did not advance			
Anastasiya Krapyvina	10 km open water	—N/a				1:57:25.9	8
Nataliya Lovtsova	50 m freestyle	25.55	38	did not advance			
Nataliya Lovtsova	100 m freestyle	55.37	28	did not advance			
Nataliya Lovtsova	100 m butterfly	59.19	25	did not advance			
Rozaliya Nasretdinova	50 m freestyle	24.94	=22	did not advance			
Arina Openysheva	200 m freestyle	1:58.05	18	did not advance			
Arina Openysheva	400 m freestyle	4:11.83	20	—N/a		did not advance	
Arina Openysheva	800 m freestyle	8:48.89	26	—N/a		did not advance	
Veronika Popova	100 m freestyle	54.60	19	did not advance			
Veronika Popova	200 m freestyle	1:57.08	11 Q	1:57.22	9	did not advance	
Daria Ustinova	100 m backstroke	1:01.45	23	did not advance			
Daria Ustinova	200 m backstroke	2:09.96	13 Q	2:08.84	7 Q	2:07.89	4
Yuliya Yefimova	100 m breaststroke	1:05.79	2 Q	1:05.72	2 Q	1:05.50	2nd place, silver medalist(s)
Yuliya Yefimova	200 m breaststroke	2:23.90	8 Q	2:22.52	6 Q	2:21.97	2nd place, silver medalist(s)
Anastasia Zuyeva	100 m backstroke	1:00.04	10 Q	59.68	9	did not advance	
Anastasia Zuyeva	200 m backstroke	2:10.39	14 Q	2:09.12	11	did not advance	
Viktoriya Andreeva; Nataliya Lovtsova; Rozaliya Nasretdinova; Veronika Popova	4 × 100 m freestyle relay	3:37.68	10	—N/a		did not advance	
Viktoriya Andreeva; Arina Openysheva; Daria Mullakaeva; Veronika Popova; Daria Ustinova	4 × 200 m freestyle relay	7:50.52	4 Q	—N/a		7:53.26	7
Anastasia Zuyeva; Yuliya Yefimova; Svetlana Chimrova; Veronika Popova	4 × 100 m medley relay	3:57.44	4 Q	—N/a		3:55.66	6

== Synchronized swimming ==
Russia has fielded a squad of nine synchronized swimmers to compete in the women's duet and team events, by winning the 2015 LEN European Champions Cup.

The synchronized swimming team, led by defending Olympic duet champions Natalia Ishchenko and Svetlana Romashina, was named on 6 July 2016. The team was cleared to compete one day prior to the opening ceremony.

Athlete	Event	Technical routine		Free routine (preliminary)			Free routine (final)		
Athlete	Event	Points	Rank	Points	Total (technical + free)	Rank	Points	Total (technical + free)	Rank
Natalia Ishchenko; Svetlana Romashina	Duet	96.4577	1	98.0667	194.5244	1 Q	98.5333	194.9910	1st place, gold medalist(s)
Vlada Chigireva; Natalia Ishchenko; Svetlana Kolesnichenko; Aleksandra Patskevich; Elena Prokofyeva; Svetlana Romashina; Alla Shishkina; Gelena Topilina; Maria Shurochkina	Team	97.0106	1	—N/a			99.1333	196.1439	1st place, gold medalist(s)

== Table tennis ==
Russia has entered three athletes into the table tennis competition at the Games. 2012 Olympian Alexander Shibaev and Polina Mikhailova secured an Olympic spot each in the men's and women's singles, respectively, by winning their respective group final match at the European Qualification Tournament in Halmstad, Sweden. Meanwhile, Maria Dolgikh granted a wildcard invitation from International Table Tennis Federation to compete in the women's singles as one of the next seven highest-ranked eligible players, not yet qualified, on the Olympic Ranking List. In regard to the doping issue, the ITTF cleared all three athletes to compete.

Athlete	Event	Preliminary	Round 1	Round 2	Round 3	Round of 16	Quarterfinals	Semifinals	Final / BM	
Athlete	Event	Opposition Result	Opposition Result	Opposition Result	Opposition Result	Opposition Result	Opposition Result	Opposition Result	Opposition Result	Rank
Alexander Shibaev	Men's singles	Bye		Dyjas (POL); W 4–0	Boll (GER); L 3–4	did not advance				
Maria Dolgikh	Women's singles	Bye	Lay J F (AUS); L 3–4	did not advance						
Polina Mikhailova	Women's singles	Bye		Pavlovich (BLR); L 2–4	did not advance					

== Taekwondo ==
Russia entered three athletes into the taekwondo competition at the Olympics. 2012 Olympic bronze medalists Aleksey Denisenko and Anastasia Baryshnikova and newcomer Albert Gaun qualified automatically for their respective weight classes by finishing in the top 6 World Taekwondo Federation Olympic rankings. In regard to doping, all of the athletes were cleared to compete.

Athlete	Event	Round of 16	Quarterfinals	Semifinals	Repechage	Final / BM	
Athlete	Event	Opposition Result	Opposition Result	Opposition Result	Opposition Result	Opposition Result	Rank
Aleksey Denisenko	Men's −68 kg	Contreras (VEN); W 12–2	Tazegül (TUR); W 19–6 PTG	Achab (BEL); W 6–1	Bye	Abu-Ghaush (JOR); L 6–10	2nd place, silver medalist(s)
Albert Gaun	Men's −80 kg	López (USA); L 4–7	did not advance				
Anastasia Baryshnikova	Women's −67 kg	Gülec (GER); L 8–9	did not advance				

== Tennis ==
London 2012 silver medalist Maria Sharapova was ruled ineligible to compete at the Games, as the International Tennis Federation ordered her a two-year suspension for testing positive in the banned substance meldonium.

Russia has entered eight tennis players (two men and six women) into the Olympic tournament. Andrey Kuznetsov (world no. 42) and Evgeny Donskoy (world no. 77) qualified directly for the men's singles as two of the top 56 eligible players in the ATP World Rankings, while Svetlana Kuznetsova (world no. 12), Anastasia Pavlyuchenkova (world no. 23), Daria Kasatkina (world no. 31), and Ekaterina Makarova (world no. 36) did so for the women's singles based on their WTA World Rankings as of 6 June 2016.

Having been directly entered to the singles, Kuznetsova and Makarova also opted to play with their partners Margarita Gasparyan and Elena Vesnina, respectively, in the women's doubles, by virtue of the former's top-10 WTA ranking on the list. Due to the withdrawal of several tennis players from the Games, Teymuraz Gabashvili (world no. 96) received a spare ITF Olympic place to join Donskoy and Kuznetsov in the men's singles.

On 14 July 2016, Gasparyan withdrew from the Olympics due to injury and was replaced with Kasaktina to be partnered with Kuznetsova.

On 24 July 2016, the International Tennis Federation announced that the eight players competing for Russia had been deemed eligible. On 4 August 2016, the IOC cleared all of the players to participate.

Men

Athlete	Event	Round of 64	Round of 32	Round of 16	Quarterfinals	Semifinals	Final / BM	
Athlete	Event	Opposition Score	Opposition Score	Opposition Score	Opposition Score	Opposition Score	Opposition Score	Rank
Evgeny Donskoy	Singles	Struff (GER); W 6–3, 6–4	Ferrer (ESP); W 3–6, 7–6^{(7–1)}, 7–5	Johnson (USA); L 1–6, 1–6	did not advance			
Teymuraz Gabashvili	Singles	Albot (MDA); L 6–4, 4–6, 4–6	did not advance					
Andrey Kuznetsov	Singles	Bautista Agut (ESP); L 7–6^{(7–4)}, 2–6, ret	did not advance					

Women

Athlete	Event	Round of 64	Round of 32	Round of 16	Quarterfinals	Semifinals	Final / BM	
Athlete	Event	Opposition Score	Opposition Score	Opposition Score	Opposition Score	Opposition Score	Opposition Score	Rank
Daria Kasatkina	Singles	Jabeur (TUN); W 3–6, 7–6^{(7–4)}, 6–1	Zheng Ss (CHN); W 6–1, 6–4	Errani (ITA); W 7–5, 6–2	Keys (USA); L 3–6, 1–6	did not advance		
Svetlana Kuznetsova	Singles	Wang Q (CHN); W 6–1, 4–6, 6–0	Niculescu (ROU); W WO	Konta (GBR); L 6–3, 5–7, 5–7	did not advance			
Ekaterina Makarova	Singles	Büyükakçay (TUR); W 3–6, 6–0, 7–6^{(8–6)}	Schmiedlová (SVK); W 3–6, 6–4, 6–2	Kvitová (CZE); L 6–4, 4–6, 4–6	did not advance			
Anastasia Pavlyuchenkova	Singles	Linette (POL); W 6–0, 6–3	Puig (PUR); L 3–6, 2–6	did not advance				
Daria Kasatkina; Svetlana Kuznetsova	Doubles	—N/a	Grönefeld / Siegemund (GER); W 6–1, 6–4	Doi / Hozumi (JPN); W 6–4, 1–6, 6–1	Hlaváčková / Hradecká (CZE); L 1–6, 6–4, 5–7	did not advance		
Ekaterina Makarova; Elena Vesnina	Doubles	—N/a	An Rodionova / Ar Rodionova (AUS); W 6–1, 6–2	Mitu / Olaru (ROU); W 6–1, 6–4	Muguruza / Suárez Navarro (ESP); W 6–3, 6–4	Šafářová / Strýcová (CZE); W 7–6^{(9–7)}, 6–4	Bacsinszky / Hingis (SUI); W 6–4, 6–4	1st place, gold medalist(s)

== Triathlon ==
Russia has qualified a total of six triathletes for the following events at the Olympics. Two-time Olympians Alexander Bryukhankov and Dmitry Polyanski, along with Igor Polyanski, Alexandra Razarenova, Anastasia Abrosimova, and Mariya Shorets, were ranked among the top 40 eligible triathletes each in the men's and women's event, respectively, based on the International Triathlon Union's Olympic Qualification List as of 15 May 2016. In regard to doping, all of the athletes were cleared to compete.

Athlete	Event	Swim (1.5 km)	Trans 1	Bike (40 km)	Trans 2	Run (10 km)	Total Time	Rank
Alexander Bryukhankov	Men's	17:26	0:51	57:03	0:46	did not finish		
Dmitry Polyanski	Men's	17:24	0:49	57:07	0:36	33:30	1:49:26	32
Igor Polyanski	Men's	17:18	0:51	56:32	0:41	33:49	1:49:11	31
Anastasia Abrosimova	Women's	19:05	0:56	1:04:44	0:38	37:22	2:02:45	32
Alexandra Razarenova	Women's	19:56	0:54	1:03:55	0:40	35:44	2:01:09	20
Mariya Shorets	Women's	19:48	1:00	1:03:54	0:41	36:10	2:01:33	25

== Volleyball ==
=== Beach ===
Three Russian beach volleyball teams (two men's pairs and one women's pair) qualified directly for the Olympics; one by virtue of their nation's top 15 placement in the FIVB Olympic Rankings as of 13 June 2016, and two others by finishing among the top two nations each in the men's and women's tournament at the 2016 FIVB Continental Cup in Sochi. In regard to doping, all of the athletes were cleared to compete.

Athlete	Event	Preliminary round	Standing	Round of 16	Quarterfinals	Semifinals	Final / BM	
Athlete	Event	Opposition Score	Standing	Opposition Score	Opposition Score	Opposition Score	Opposition Score	Rank
Viacheslav Krasilnikov; Konstantin Semenov	Men's	Pool E Fijałek – Prudel (POL); W 2 – 0 (21–14, 21–13); E. Grimalt – M. Grimalt (CHI); W 2 – 0 (21–17, 21–14); Nummerdor – Varenhorst (NED); W 2 – 1 (21–15, 14–21, 15–9)	1 Q	Cherif – Jefferson (QAT); W 2 – 0 (21–13, 21–13)	Díaz – González (CUB); W 2 – 1 (22–20, 22–24, 18–16)	Lupo – Nicolai (ITA); L 1 – 2 (21–15, 16–21, 13–15)	Brouwer – Meeuwsen (NED); L 0 – 2 (21–23, 20–22)	4
Dmitri Barsouk; Nikita Liamin	Men's	Pool B Brouwer – Meeuwsen (NED); L 0 – 2 (15–21, 14–21); Kantor – Łosiak (POL); W 2 – 0 (21–14, 21–17); Böckermann – Flüggen (GER); W 2 – 0 (21–14, 21–17)	2 Q	Evandro – Pedro Solberg (BRA); W 2 – 1 (16–21, 21–14, 15–10)	Lupo – Nicolai (ITA); L 1 – 2 (18–21, 22–20, 11–15)	did not advance		
Ekaterina Birlova; Evgenia Ukolova	Women's	Pool A Antunes – França (BRA); L 0 – 2 (14–21, 16–21); Brzostek – Kołosińska (POL); L 0 – 2 (19–21, 18–21); Fendrick – Sweat (USA); W 2 – 1 (21–18, 24–26, 15–13); Lucky Losers; Hermannová – Sluková (CZE); W 2 – 1 (21–19, 12–21, 15–10)	3 q	Baquerizo – Fernández (ESP); W 2 – 0 (23–21, 24–22)	Ágatha – Bárbara (BRA); L 0 – 2 (21–23, 16–21)	did not advance		

=== Indoor ===
==== Men's tournament ====
Russia men's volleyball team qualified for the Olympics by attaining a top finish and securing a lone outright berth at the European Olympic Qualification Tournament in Germany. In regard to doping, all of Russian volleyball athletes were cleared to compete.

Team roster

The following is the Russia roster in the men's volleyball tournament of the 2016 Summer Olympics.

Head coach: Vladimir Alekno

No.	Name	Date of birth	Height	Weight	Spike	Block	2015–16 club
1	Igor Kobzar	13 April 1991	1.98 m (6 ft 6 in)	86 kg (190 lb)	337 cm (133 in)	315 cm (124 in)	(Russia) Zenit Kazan
5	Sergey Grankin	21 January 1985	1.95 m (6 ft 5 in)	96 kg (212 lb)	351 cm (138 in)	320 cm (130 in)	(Russia) Dynamo Moscow
7	Dmitry Volkov	25 May 1995	2.01 m (6 ft 7 in)	88 kg (194 lb)	340 cm (130 in)	330 cm (130 in)	(Russia) Fakel Novy Urengoy
8	Sergey Tetyukhin (c)	23 September 1975	1.97 m (6 ft 6 in)	89 kg (196 lb)	345 cm (136 in)	338 cm (133 in)	(Russia) Belogorie Belgorod
11	Andrey Ashchev	10 May 1983	2.02 m (6 ft 8 in)	105 kg (231 lb)	350 cm (140 in)	338 cm (133 in)	(Russia) Zenit Kazan
12	Konstantin Bakun	15 March 1985	2.04 m (6 ft 8 in)	96 kg (212 lb)	348 cm (137 in)	325 cm (128 in)	(Russia) Gazprom-Ugra Surgut
14	Artem Volvich	22 January 1990	2.08 m (6 ft 10 in)	96 kg (212 lb)	350 cm (140 in)	330 cm (130 in)	(Russia) Lokomotiv Novosibirsk
16	Aleksey Verbov (L)	31 January 1982	1.83 m (6 ft 0 in)	79 kg (174 lb)	315 cm (124 in)	310 cm (120 in)	(Russia) Zenit Kazan
17	Maxim Mikhaylov	19 March 1988	2.02 m (6 ft 8 in)	103 kg (227 lb)	345 cm (136 in)	330 cm (130 in)	(Russia) Zenit Kazan
18	Aleksandr Volkov	14 February 1985	2.10 m (6 ft 11 in)	90 kg (200 lb)	360 cm (140 in)	335 cm (132 in)	(Russia) Ural Ufa
19	Egor Kliuka	15 June 1995	2.08 m (6 ft 10 in)	93 kg (205 lb)	360 cm (140 in)	350 cm (140 in)	(Russia) Fakel Novy Urengoy
20	Artem Ermakov	16 March 1982	1.88 m (6 ft 2 in)	80 kg (180 lb)	323 cm (127 in)	313 cm (123 in)	(Russia) Dynamo Moscow

Group play

Pos	Team	Pld	W	L	Pts	SW	SL	SR	SPW	SPL	SPR	Qualification
1	Argentina	5	4	1	12	12	4	3.000	394	335	1.176	Quarterfinals
2	Poland	5	4	1	12	14	5	2.800	447	389	1.149	Quarterfinals
3	Russia	5	4	1	11	13	6	2.167	432	367	1.177	Quarterfinals
4	Iran	5	2	3	7	8	9	0.889	389	392	0.992	Quarterfinals
5	Egypt	5	1	4	3	3	12	0.250	286	362	0.790	
6	Cuba	5	0	5	0	1	15	0.067	300	403	0.744	

Source: FIVB
Rules for classification: Tiebreakers

7 August 2016; 20:30	Russia	3–1	Cuba	Ginásio do Maracanãzinho, Rio de Janeiro; Attendance: 6,287; Referees: Vladimir Simonović (SRB), Rogerio Espicalsky (BRA)
7 August 2016; 20:30	(25–17, 25–19, 22–25, 25–18); Results Statistics			Ginásio do Maracanãzinho, Rio de Janeiro; Attendance: 6,287; Referees: Vladimir Simonović (SRB), Rogerio Espicalsky (BRA)

9 August 2016; 09:30	Russia	1–3	Argentina	Ginásio do Maracanãzinho, Rio de Janeiro; Attendance: 7,165; Referees: Arturo di Giacomo (BEL), Heike Kraft (GER)
9 August 2016; 09:30	(18–25, 25–18, 18–25, 21–25); Results Statistics			Ginásio do Maracanãzinho, Rio de Janeiro; Attendance: 7,165; Referees: Arturo di Giacomo (BEL), Heike Kraft (GER)

11 August 2016; 11:35	Russia	3–0	Egypt	Ginásio do Maracanãzinho, Rio de Janeiro; Attendance: 6,665; Referees: Paulo Turci (BRA), Ibrahim Al-Naama (QAT)
11 August 2016; 11:35	(25–11, 25–17, 25–9); Results Statistics			Ginásio do Maracanãzinho, Rio de Janeiro; Attendance: 6,665; Referees: Paulo Turci (BRA), Ibrahim Al-Naama (QAT)

13 August 2016; 15:00	Poland	2–3	Russia	Ginásio do Maracanãzinho, Rio de Janeiro; Attendance: 7,239; Referees: Fabrizio Pasquali (ITA), Juraj Mokrý (SVK)
13 August 2016; 15:00	(18–25, 25–16, 18–25, 25–22, 13–15); Results Statistics			Ginásio do Maracanãzinho, Rio de Janeiro; Attendance: 7,239; Referees: Fabrizio Pasquali (ITA), Juraj Mokrý (SVK)

15 August 2016; 15:00	Russia	3–0	Iran	Ginásio do Maracanãzinho, Rio de Janeiro; Attendance: 7,387; Referees: Liu Jiang (CHN), Fabrizio Pasquali (ITA)
15 August 2016; 15:00	(25–23, 25–16, 25–20); Results Statistics			Ginásio do Maracanãzinho, Rio de Janeiro; Attendance: 7,387; Referees: Liu Jiang (CHN), Fabrizio Pasquali (ITA)

Quarterfinal

17 August 2016; 10:00	Canada	0–3	Russia	Ginásio do Maracanãzinho, Rio de Janeiro; Attendance: 6,291; Referees: Arturo Di Giacomo (BEL), Mohammad Shahmiri (IRI)
17 August 2016; 10:00	(15–25, 20–25, 18–25); Results Statistics			Ginásio do Maracanãzinho, Rio de Janeiro; Attendance: 6,291; Referees: Arturo Di Giacomo (BEL), Mohammad Shahmiri (IRI)

Semifinal

19 August 2016; 22:15	Russia	0–3	Brazil	Ginásio do Maracanãzinho, Rio de Janeiro; Attendance: 9,784; Referees: Juraj Mokrý (SVK), Vladimir Simonović (SRB)
19 August 2016; 22:15	(21–25, 20–25, 17–25); Results Statistics			Ginásio do Maracanãzinho, Rio de Janeiro; Attendance: 9,784; Referees: Juraj Mokrý (SVK), Vladimir Simonović (SRB)

Bronze medal match

21 August 2016; 09:30	United States	3–2	Russia	Ginásio do Maracanãzinho, Rio de Janeiro; Attendance: 6,976; Referees: Fabrizio Pasquali (ITA), Liu Jiang (CHN)
21 August 2016; 09:30	(23–25, 21–25, 25–19, 25–19, 15–13); Results Statistics			Ginásio do Maracanãzinho, Rio de Janeiro; Attendance: 6,976; Referees: Fabrizio Pasquali (ITA), Liu Jiang (CHN)

==== Women's tournament ====
Russia women's volleyball team qualified for the Olympics by attaining a top finish and securing a lone outright berth at the European Olympic Qualification Tournament in Turkey.

Team roster

The following is the Russian roster in the women's volleyball tournament of the 2016 Summer Olympics.

Head coach: Yuri Marichev

No.	Name	Date of birth	Height	Weight	Spike	Block	2015–16 club
1	Yana Shcherban	6 September 1989	1.86 m (6 ft 1 in)	71 kg (157 lb)	298 cm (117 in)	294 cm (116 in)	(Russia) Dynamo Moscow
3	Elena Ezhova	14 August 1977	1.78 m (5 ft 10 in)	69 kg (152 lb)	288 cm (113 in)	282 cm (111 in)	(Russia) Dynamo Kazan
4	Irina Zaryazhko	4 October 1991	1.96 m (6 ft 5 in)	78 kg (172 lb)	305 cm (120 in)	290 cm (110 in)	(Russia) Uralochka Ekaterinburg
6	Daria Malygina	4 April 1994	1.98 m (6 ft 6 in)	82 kg (181 lb)	317 cm (125 in)	305 cm (120 in)	(Russia) Zarechie Odintsovo
8	Nataliya Goncharova	1 June 1989	1.95 m (6 ft 5 in)	75 kg (165 lb)	315 cm (124 in)	306 cm (120 in)	(Russia) Dynamo Moscow
9	Vera Ulyakina	21 August 1986	1.81 m (5 ft 11 in)	73 kg (161 lb)	298 cm (117 in)	293 cm (115 in)	(Russia) Dynamo Moscow
10	Ekaterina Kosianenko (c)	2 February 1990	1.76 m (5 ft 9 in)	64 kg (141 lb)	290 cm (110 in)	285 cm (112 in)	(Russia) Dynamo Moscow
14	Irina Fetisova	7 September 1994	1.89 m (6 ft 2 in)	76 kg (168 lb)	307 cm (121 in)	286 cm (113 in)	(Russia) Dynamo Moscow
15	Tatiana Kosheleva	23 December 1988	1.91 m (6 ft 3 in)	67 kg (148 lb)	315 cm (124 in)	305 cm (120 in)	(Russia) Dinamo Krasnodar
16	Irina Voronkova	20 October 1995	1.90 m (6 ft 3 in)	84 kg (185 lb)	305 cm (120 in)	290 cm (110 in)	(Russia) Zarechie Odintsovo
19	Anna Malova (L)	16 April 1990	1.75 m (5 ft 9 in)	59 kg (130 lb)	286 cm (113 in)	290 cm (110 in)	(Russia) Dynamo Moscow
20	Anastasia Shlyakhovaya	5 October 1990	1.92 m (6 ft 4 in)	69 kg (152 lb)	313 cm (123 in)	307 cm (121 in)	(Russia) Dinamo Krasnodar

Group play

Pos	Team	Pld	W	L	Pts	SW	SL	SR	SPW	SPL	SPR	Qualification
1	Brazil (H)	5	5	0	15	15	0	MAX	377	272	1.386	Quarter-finals
2	Russia	5	4	1	12	12	4	3.000	393	323	1.217	Quarter-finals
3	South Korea	5	3	2	9	10	7	1.429	384	372	1.032	Quarter-finals
4	Japan	5	2	3	6	7	9	0.778	347	364	0.953	Quarter-finals
5	Argentina	5	1	4	2	3	14	0.214	319	407	0.784	
6	Cameroon	5	0	5	1	2	15	0.133	328	410	0.800	

Source: FIVB
Rules for classification: Tiebreakers
(H) Host

6 August 2016; 20:30	Russia	3–0	Argentina	Ginásio do Maracanãzinho, Rio de Janeiro; Attendance: 5,437; Referees: Ibrahim Al-Naama (QAT), Luis Macias (MEX)
6 August 2016; 20:30	(25–13, 25–10, 25–16); Result Statistics			Ginásio do Maracanãzinho, Rio de Janeiro; Attendance: 5,437; Referees: Ibrahim Al-Naama (QAT), Luis Macias (MEX)

8 August 2016; 20:30	Russia	3–1	South Korea	Ginásio do Maracanãzinho, Rio de Janeiro; Attendance: 5,398; Referees: Piotr Dudek (POL), Ibrahim Al-Naama (QAT)
8 August 2016; 20:30	(25–23, 23–25, 25–23, 25–14); Result Statistics			Ginásio do Maracanãzinho, Rio de Janeiro; Attendance: 5,398; Referees: Piotr Dudek (POL), Ibrahim Al-Naama (QAT)

10 August 2016; 17:05	Russia	3–0	Cameroon	Ginásio do Maracanãzinho, Rio de Janeiro; Attendance: 6,396; Referees: Ibrahim Al-Naama (QAT), Mohammad Shahmiri (IRI)
10 August 2016; 17:05	(25–19, 25–22, 25–23); Result Statistics			Ginásio do Maracanãzinho, Rio de Janeiro; Attendance: 6,396; Referees: Ibrahim Al-Naama (QAT), Mohammad Shahmiri (IRI)

12 August 2016; 20:30	Russia	3–0	Japan	Ginásio do Maracanãzinho, Rio de Janeiro; Attendance: 7,448; Referees: Mohammad Shahmiri (IRI), Heike Kraft (GER)
12 August 2016; 20:30	(25–14, 30–28, 25–18); Result Statistics			Ginásio do Maracanãzinho, Rio de Janeiro; Attendance: 7,448; Referees: Mohammad Shahmiri (IRI), Heike Kraft (GER)

14 August 2016; 22:35	Brazil	3–0	Russia	Ginásio do Maracanãzinho, Rio de Janeiro; Attendance: 8,892; Referees: Nasr Shaaban (EGY), Taoufik Boudaya (TUN)
14 August 2016; 22:35	(25–23, 25–21, 25–21); Result Statistics			Ginásio do Maracanãzinho, Rio de Janeiro; Attendance: 8,892; Referees: Nasr Shaaban (EGY), Taoufik Boudaya (TUN)

Quarterfinal

16 August 2016; 18:00	Russia	0–3	Serbia	Ginásio do Maracanãzinho, Rio de Janeiro; Attendance: 7,121; Referees: Susana Rodríguez (ESP), Hernán Casamiquela (ARG)
16 August 2016; 18:00	(9–25, 22–25, 21–25); Result Statistics			Ginásio do Maracanãzinho, Rio de Janeiro; Attendance: 7,121; Referees: Susana Rodríguez (ESP), Hernán Casamiquela (ARG)

== Water polo ==
Summary

Key:

- FT – After full time.
- P – Match decided by penalty-shootout.

Team	Event	Group Stage						Quarterfinal	Semifinal	Final / BM	
Team	Event	Opposition Score	Opposition Score	Opposition Score	Opposition Score	Opposition Score	Rank	Opposition Score	Opposition Score	Opposition Score	Rank
Russia women's	Women's tournament	Australia; L 4–14	Brazil; W 14–7	Italy; L 5–10	—N/a		3	Spain; W 12–10	Italy; L 9–12	Hungary; W 7–6^{P} FT: 12–12	3rd place, bronze medalist(s)

=== Women's tournament ===
Russia women's water polo team qualified for the Olympics by virtue of a top four finish at the Olympic Qualification Tournament in Gouda. In regard to doping, as of 7 July 2016 FINA stated that it would not disqualify the team.

Team roster

The following is the Russian roster in the women's water polo tournament of the 2016 Summer Olympics.

Head coach: Alexandr Gaidukov

№	Name	Pos.	Height	Weight	Date of birth	2016 club
1	Anna Ustyukhina	GK	1.77 m (5 ft 10 in)	70 kg (154 lb)	18 March 1989	(Russia) SKIF-CSP Izmailovo
2	Nadezhda Fedotova	D	1.75 m (5 ft 9 in)	68 kg (150 lb)	20 May 1988	(Russia) Kinef Kirishi
3	Ekaterina Prokofyeva (c)	D	1.76 m (5 ft 9 in)	70 kg (154 lb)	13 March 1991	(Russia) Kinef Kirishi
4	Elvina Karimova	D	1.66 m (5 ft 5 in)	62 kg (137 lb)	25 March 1994	(Russia) Uralochka Zlatoust
5	Maria Borisova	D	1.84 m (6 ft 0 in)	95 kg (209 lb)	28 July 1997	(Russia) SKIF-CSP Izmailovo
6	Olga Belova	CB	1.69 m (5 ft 7 in)	60 kg (132 lb)	27 August 1993	(Russia) Uralochka Zlatoust
7	Ekaterina Lisunova	D	1.75 m (5 ft 9 in)	64 kg (141 lb)	6 October 1989	(Russia) Ugra Khanty-Mansiysk
8	Anastasia Simanovich	CF	1.74 m (5 ft 9 in)	69 kg (152 lb)	23 January 1995	(Russia) Kinef Kirishi
9	Anna Timofeeva	CF	1.78 m (5 ft 10 in)	86 kg (190 lb)	18 July 1987	(Russia) Ugra Khanty-Mansiysk
10	Evgenia Soboleva	CB	1.80 m (5 ft 11 in)	75 kg (165 lb)	26 August 1988	(Russia) Kinef Kirishi
11	Evgeniya Ivanova	D	1.76 m (5 ft 9 in)	67 kg (148 lb)	26 July 1987	(Russia) Kinef Kirishi
12	Anna Grineva	CB	1.85 m (6 ft 1 in)	87 kg (192 lb)	31 January 1988	(Russia) Spartak Volgograd
13	Anna Karnaukh	GK	1.73 m (5 ft 8 in)	61 kg (134 lb)	31 August 1993	(Russia) Kinef Kirishi

Group play

Pos	Team	Pld	W	D	L	GF	GA	GD	Pts	Qualification
1	Italy	3	3	0	0	27	15	+12	6	Quarter-finals
2	Australia	3	2	0	1	31	15	+16	4	Quarter-finals
3	Russia	3	1	0	2	23	31	−8	2	Quarter-finals
4	Brazil (H)	3	0	0	3	13	33	−20	0	Quarter-finals

Source: Rio2016
Rules for classification: 1) Points; 2) Head-to-head points; 3) Head-to-head goal difference; 4) Head-to-head goals scored; 5) Goal difference.
(H) Hosts

9 August 2016; 13:00	Report	Russia	4–14	Australia	Maria Lenk Aquatic Center, Rio de Janeiro; Referees: Marie-Claude Deslières (CAN), Adrian Alexandrescu (ROU)
9 August 2016; 13:00	Report	Score by quarters: 0–3, 1–5, 3–2, 0–4			Maria Lenk Aquatic Center, Rio de Janeiro; Referees: Marie-Claude Deslières (CAN), Adrian Alexandrescu (ROU)
9 August 2016; 13:00	Report	Prokofyeva 2	Goals	Southern 4	Maria Lenk Aquatic Center, Rio de Janeiro; Referees: Marie-Claude Deslières (CAN), Adrian Alexandrescu (ROU)

11 August 2016; 09:00	Report	Russia	14–7	Brazil	Maria Lenk Aquatic Center, Rio de Janeiro; Referees: Diana Dutilh-Dumas (NED), Tadao Tahara (JPN)
11 August 2016; 09:00	Report	Score by quarters: 2–4, 2–0, 4–2, 6–1			Maria Lenk Aquatic Center, Rio de Janeiro; Referees: Diana Dutilh-Dumas (NED), Tadao Tahara (JPN)
11 August 2016; 09:00	Report	Ivanova, Prokofyeva 3	Goals	Chiappini 4	Maria Lenk Aquatic Center, Rio de Janeiro; Referees: Diana Dutilh-Dumas (NED), Tadao Tahara (JPN)

13 August 2016; 10:20	Report	Russia	5–10	Italy	Maria Lenk Aquatic Center, Rio de Janeiro; Referees: Joseph Peila (USA), Adrian Alexandrescu (ROU)
13 August 2016; 10:20	Report	Score by quarters: 2–3, 1–2, 1–3, 1–2			Maria Lenk Aquatic Center, Rio de Janeiro; Referees: Joseph Peila (USA), Adrian Alexandrescu (ROU)
13 August 2016; 10:20	Report	Grineva 2	Goals	Bianconi 3	Maria Lenk Aquatic Center, Rio de Janeiro; Referees: Joseph Peila (USA), Adrian Alexandrescu (ROU)

Quarterfinal

15 August 2016; 18:20	Report	Russia	12–10	Spain	Olympic Aquatics Stadium, Rio de Janeiro; Referees: Marie-Claude Deslières (CAN), Nenad Peris (CRO)
15 August 2016; 18:20	Report	Score by quarters: 2–3, 3–2, 5–3, 2–2			Olympic Aquatics Stadium, Rio de Janeiro; Referees: Marie-Claude Deslières (CAN), Nenad Peris (CRO)
15 August 2016; 18:20	Report	Fedotova 4	Goals	López, Tarragó 3	Olympic Aquatics Stadium, Rio de Janeiro; Referees: Marie-Claude Deslières (CAN), Nenad Peris (CRO)

Semifinal

17 August 2016; 12:20	Report	Russia	9–12	Italy	Olympic Aquatics Stadium, Rio de Janeiro; Referees: Mark Koganov (AZE), Francesc Buch (ESP)
17 August 2016; 12:20	Report	Score by quarters: 2–2, 2–4, 0–2, 5–4			Olympic Aquatics Stadium, Rio de Janeiro; Referees: Mark Koganov (AZE), Francesc Buch (ESP)
17 August 2016; 12:20	Report	Ivanova, Lisunova 2	Goals	Garibotti 5	Olympic Aquatics Stadium, Rio de Janeiro; Referees: Mark Koganov (AZE), Francesc Buch (ESP)

Bronze medal match

19 August 2016; 11:20	Report	Hungary	18–19 (PSO)	Russia	Olympic Aquatics Stadium, Rio de Janeiro; Referees: Diana Dutilh-Dumas (NED), Fillippo Gomez (ITA)
19 August 2016; 11:20	Report	Score by quarters: 3–3, 3–4, 3–1, 3–4 PSO: 6–7			Olympic Aquatics Stadium, Rio de Janeiro; Referees: Diana Dutilh-Dumas (NED), Fillippo Gomez (ITA)
19 August 2016; 11:20	Report	Bujka 3	Goals	Fedotova 5	Olympic Aquatics Stadium, Rio de Janeiro; Referees: Diana Dutilh-Dumas (NED), Fillippo Gomez (ITA)

== Wrestling ==
Russia has fielded a full squad of seventeen wrestlers across all weight classes (except women's freestyle 53 kg) into the Olympic competition. Majority of Olympic berths were awarded to Russian wrestlers, who finished among the top six of their respective weight classes at the 2015 World Championships, while three more secured their Olympic spots each in the men's Greco-Roman 59 & 85 kg and women's freestyle 63 kg at the 2016 European Qualification Tournament.

Two further wrestlers had claimed the remaining Olympic slots each in the women's freestyle 58 & 75 kg to complete the Russian wrestling line-up at the final meet of the World Qualification Tournament in Istanbul.

The men's freestyle wrestling team was named to the Olympic roster on 6 July 2016, with the women joining them on 19 July. The men's Greco-Roman wrestlers rounded out the squad on 22 July 2016.

On 28 July, United World Wrestling announced that four-time world medalist Viktor Lebedev was deemed ineligible to compete and had his quota place revoked in the men's freestyle 57 kg, by reason of his previous doping ban. The rest of wrestlers were cleared to compete. On 6 August, the IOC recanted their decision on the international doping ban, allowing Lebedev and others to compete in Rio.

Key:

- VT – Victory by fall.
- PP – Decision by points – the loser with technical points.
- PO – Decision by points – the loser without technical points.
- SP – Technical superiority – the loser with technical points and a margin of victory of at least 8 (Greco-Roman) or 10 (freestyle) points.
- ST – Great superiority – the loser without technical points and a margin of victory of at least 8 (Greco-Roman) or 10 (freestyle) points.

Men's freestyle

Athlete	Event	Qualification	Round of 16	Quarterfinal	Semifinal	Repechage 1	Repechage 2	Final / BM	
Athlete	Event	Opposition Result	Opposition Result	Opposition Result	Opposition Result	Opposition Result	Opposition Result	Opposition Result	Rank
Viktor Lebedev	−57 kg	Bye	Tomar (IND); W 3–1 ^{PP}	Rahimi (IRI); L 1–3 ^{PP}	did not advance				9
Soslan Ramonov	−65 kg	Garcia (CAN); W 3–1 ^{PP}	Valdés (CUB); W 3–1 ^{PP}	Ganzorig (MGL); W 3–0 ^{PO}	Navruzov (UZB); W 4–1 ^{SP}	Bye		Asgarov (AZE); W 4–0 ^{ST}	1st place, gold medalist(s)
Aniuar Geduev	−74 kg	Bye	Abdurakhmonov (UZB); W 3–1 ^{PP}	Burroughs (USA); W 3–2 ^{PP}	Hasanov (AZE); W 3–1 ^{PP}	Bye		Yazdani (IRI); L 1–3 ^{PP}	2nd place, silver medalist(s)
Abdulrashid Sadulaev	−86 kg	Bye	Veréb (HUN); W 4–0 ^{ST}	Ceballos (VEN); W 3–0 ^{PO}	Sharifov (AZE); W 3–1 ^{PP}	Bye		Yaşar (TUR); W 3–0 ^{PO}	1st place, gold medalist(s)
Anzor Boltukayev	−97 kg	Bye	Andriitsev (UKR); L 1–3 ^{PP}	did not advance					11
Bilyal Makhov	−125 kg	Zasyeyev (UKR); L 1–3 ^{PP}	did not advance						13

Men's Greco-Roman

Athlete	Event	Qualification	Round of 16	Quarterfinal	Semifinal	Repechage 1	Repechage 2	Final / BM	
Athlete	Event	Opposition Result	Opposition Result	Opposition Result	Opposition Result	Opposition Result	Opposition Result	Opposition Result	Rank
Ibragim Labazanov	−59 kg	Kebispayev (KAZ); L 0–3 ^{PO}	did not advance						16
Islambek Albiev	−66 kg	Panait (ROU); W 3–1 ^{PP}	Chunayev (AZE); L 1–3 ^{PP}	did not advance					9
Roman Vlasov	−75 kg	Bye	Kim H-w (KOR); W 3–1 ^{PP}	Yang B (CHN); W 4–0 ^{ST}	Starčević (CRO); W 3–1 ^{PP}	Bye		Madsen (DEN); W 3–1 ^{PP}	1st place, gold medalist(s)
Davit Chakvetadze	−85 kg	Tahmasebi (AZE); W 3–0 ^{PO}	Akhlaghi (IRI); W 5–0 ^{VT}	Kudla (GER); W 4–0 ^{ST}	Lőrincz (HUN); W 3–1 ^{ST}	Bye		Beleniuk (UKR); W 3–1 ^{PP}	1st place, gold medalist(s)
Islam Magomedov	−98 kg	Bye	Arusaar (EST); W 3–0 ^{PO}	İldem (TUR); L 1–3 ^{PP}	did not advance				8
Sergey Semenov	−130 kg	Ramonov (KGZ); W 3–1 ^{PP}	Abdullaev (UZB); W 3–0 ^{PO}	Kajaia (GEO); W 3–0 ^{PO}	López (CUB); L 0–3 ^{PO}	Bye		Nabi (EST); W 3–0 ^{PO}	3rd place, bronze medalist(s)

Women's freestyle

Athlete	Event	Qualification	Round of 16	Quarterfinal	Semifinal	Repechage 1	Repechage 2	Final / BM	
Athlete	Event	Opposition Result	Opposition Result	Opposition Result	Opposition Result	Opposition Result	Opposition Result	Opposition Result	Rank
Milana Dadasheva	−48 kg	Kim H-g (PRK); W 3–1 ^{PP}	Yankova (BUL); L 1–3 ^{PP}	did not advance					11
Valeria Koblova	−58 kg	Niemesch (GER); W 3–0 ^{PO}	Pürevdorj (MGL); W 4–0 ^{ST}	Malik (IND); W 3–1 ^{PP}	Tynybekova (KGZ); W 3–1 ^{PP}	Bye		Icho (JPN); L 1–3 ^{PP}	2nd place, silver medalist(s)
Inna Trazhukova	−63 kg	Sastin (HUN); W 3–0 ^{PO}	Şahin (TUR); W 3–1 ^{PP}	Xu R (CHN); W 3–1 ^{PP}	Kawai (JPN); L 0–4 ^{ST}	Bye		Michalik (POL); L 1–3 ^{PP}	5
Natalia Vorobieva	−69 kg	Bye	Syzdykova (KAZ); W 3–1 ^{PP}	Ochirbat (MGL); W 5–0 ^{VT}	Mostafa (EGY); W 5–0 ^{VT}	Bye		Dosho (JPN); L 1–3 ^{PP}	2nd place, silver medalist(s)
Ekaterina Bukina	−75 kg	Amer (EGY); W 3–1 ^{PP}	Adar (TUR); W 3–1 ^{PP}	Ferreira (BRA); W 3–1 ^{PP}	Manyurova (KAZ); L 0–5 ^{VT}	Bye		Ali (CMR); W 3–1 ^{PP}	3rd place, bronze medalist(s)

== See also ==
- Russia at the 2016 Summer Paralympics
