= Canoeing at the 2016 Summer Olympics – Men's C-1 1000 metres =

Men's canoe sprint C-1 1000 metres events at the Olympics

Men's canoe sprint C-1 1000 metres at the Games of the XXXI Olympiad
- Venue: Lagoa Stadium
- Date: 15–16 August 2016
- Competitors: 19 from 19 nations
- Winning time: 3:56.926

Medalists
1st place, gold medalist(s)		Sebastian Brendel	Germany
2nd place, silver medalist(s)		Isaquias Queiroz	Brazil
3rd place, bronze medalist(s)		Ilia Shtokalov	Russia

The men's canoe sprint C-1 1000 metres at the 2016 Olympic Games in Rio de Janeiro took place between 15 and 16 August at Lagoa Stadium. The medals were presented by Tony Estanguet, IOC member, France and István Vaskuti, First Vice President of the ICF.

== Competition format ==
The competition comprised heats, semifinals, and a final round. The top boats from each heat advance to the "A" final, and the remaining boats advance to the semifinals. The top two boats in each semifinal and the next overall best boat advanced to the "A" final, and competed for medals. A placing "B" final was held for the other semifinalists.

== Schedule ==
All times are Brasilia Time (UTC-03:00)

Date	Time	Round
Monday, 15 August 2016	8:00; 10:30	Heats; Semifinals
Tuesday, 16 August 2016	9:00	Finals

== Results ==
=== Heats ===
First boat progresses to A final and the remaining boats are qualified for the semifinals.

==== Heat 1 ====
Rank	Canoer	Country	Time	Notes
1	Sebastian Brendel	Germany	3:58.044	FA
2	Tomasz Kaczor	Poland	3:59.928	SF
3	Henrik Vasbányai	Hungary	4:01.953	SF
4	Dagnis Iljins	Latvia	4:11.766	SF
5	Vincent Farkas	Slovakia	4:12.295	SF
6	Martin Marinov	Australia	4:33.166	SF
7	Mussa Chamaune	Mozambique	5:00.454	SF

==== Heat 2 ====
Rank	Canoer	Country	Time	Notes
1	Isaquias Queiroz	Brazil	3:59.615	FA
2	Martin Fuksa	Czech Republic	4:01.492	SF
3	Ilia Shtokalov	Russia	4:02.626	SF
4	Carlo Tacchini	Italy	4:04.697	SF
5	Adrien Bart	France	4:10.043	SF
6	Buly Da Conceição Triste	São Tomé and Príncipe	4:54.516	SF

==== Heat 3 ====
Rank	Canoer	Country	Time	Notes
1	Serghei Tarnovschi	Moldova	4:05.193	FA
2	Gerasim Kochnev	Uzbekistan	4:08.127	SF
3	Mark Oldershaw	Canada	4:13.600	SF
4	Pavlo Altukhov	Ukraine	4:19.361	SF
5	Angel Kodinov	Bulgaria	4:27.904	SF
6	Timur Khaidarov	Kazakhstan	5:30.030	SF

=== Semifinals ===
The fastest two canoeists in each semifinal, and the overall next best time qualify for the 'A' final. The next four canoeists in each semifinal qualify for the 'B' final.

==== Semifinal 1 ====
Rank	Canoer	Country	Time	Notes
1	Ilia Shtokalov	Russia	3:58.259	FA
2	Pavlo Altukhov	Ukraine	3:58.574	FA
3	Gerasim Kochnev	Uzbekistan	3:59.489	FA
4	Tomasz Kaczor	Poland	3:59.836	FB
5	Adrien Bart	France	4:08.593	FB
6	Dagnis Iljins	Latvia	4:20.181	FB
7	Martin Marinov	Australia	4:24.723	FB
8	Timur Khaidarov	Kazakhstan	5:33.919	

==== Semifinal 2 ====
Rank	Canoer	Country	Time	Notes
1	Martin Fuksa	Czech Republic	4:01.793	FA
2	Carlo Tacchini	Italy	4:02.461	FA
3	Henrik Vasbányai	Hungary	4:03.113	FB
4	Mark Oldershaw	Canada	4:03.493	FB
5	Vincent Farkas	Slovakia	4:19.084	FB
6	Angel Kodinov	Bulgaria	4:30.574	FB
7	Buly Da Conceição Triste	São Tomé and Príncipe	4:46.396	
8	Mussa Chamaune	Mozambique	5:07.281	

=== Finals ===
==== Final B ====
Rank	Canoer	Country	Time	Notes
1	Tomasz Kaczor	Poland	3:59.350	
2	Adrien Bart	France	4:00.911	
3	Vincent Farkas	Slovakia	4:04.013	
4	Mark Oldershaw	Canada	4:06.972	
5	Dagnis Iljins	Latvia	4:10.084	
6	Angel Kodinov	Bulgaria	4:10.102	
7	Martin Marinov	Australia	4:15.524	
	Henrik Vasbányai	Hungary	DSQ	

==== Final A ====
Rank	Canoer	Country	Time	Notes
1st place, gold medalist(s)	Sebastian Brendel	Germany	3:56.926	
2nd place, silver medalist(s)	Isaquias Queiroz	Brazil	3:58.529	
3rd place, bronze medalist(s)	Ilia Shtokalov	Russia	4:00.963	
4	Pavlo Altukhov	Ukraine	4:01.587	
5	Martin Fuksa	Czech Republic	4:03.322	
6	Gerasim Kochnev	Uzbekistan	4:04.205	
7	Carlo Tacchini	Italy	4:15.368	
	Serghei Tarnovschi	Moldova	4:00.852 (DSQ)*	

- Serghei Tarnovschi finished third, but was suspended and stripped of his bronze medal due to a failed doping test.
