= Vincent Farkaš =

Slovak canoeist

Personal information
- Born: 13 January 1993 (age 33)

Sport
- Sport: Canoe sprint

Vincent Farkaš (born 13 January 1993) is a Slovak canoeist. He competed in the men's C-1 1000 metres event at the 2016 Summer Olympics.
