= Ilia Shtokalov =

Russian canoeist

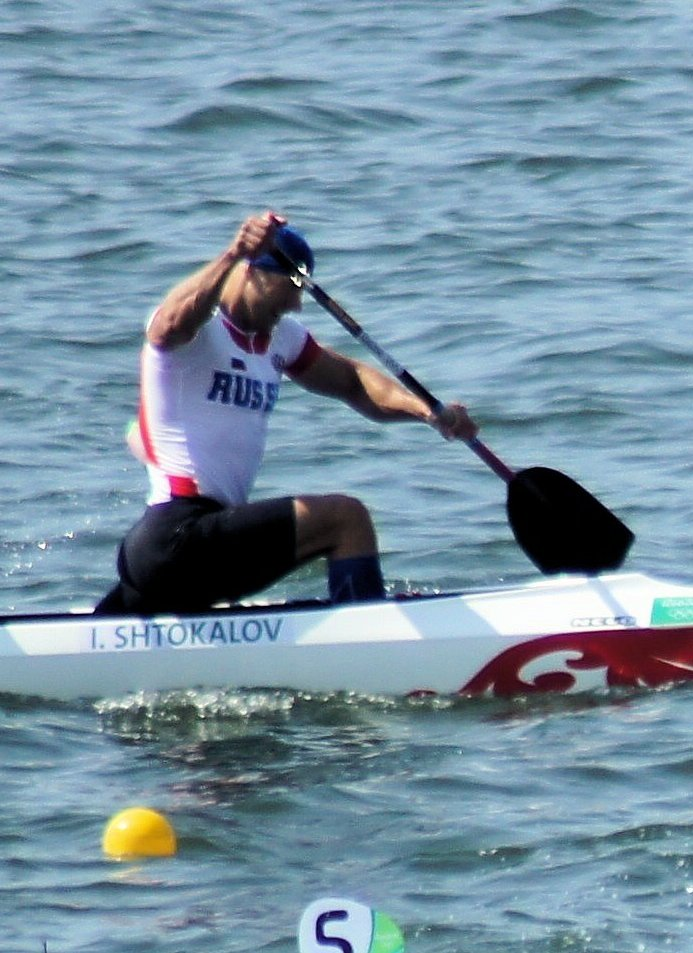
- Shtokalov at the 2016 Olympics

Personal information
- Born: 1 September 1986 (age 39) Pobeda, Russian SFSR, Soviet Union

Sport
- Country: Russia
- Sport: Men's canoe sprint
- Club: Dynamo
Medal record
Men's canoe sprint
Representing Russia
Olympic Games
Bronze medal – third place	2016 Rio de Janeiro	C-1 1000m
European Championships
Bronze medal – third place	2009 Brandenburg	C-4 1000 m
Bronze medal – third place	2017 Plovdiv	C-4 1000 m

Ilia Anatolyevich Shtokalov (Russian: Илья Анатольевич Штокалов; born 1 September 1986, in Pobeda) is a Russian sprint canoeist. At the 2012 Summer Olympics, he competed in the Men's C-1 1000 metres. He finished 8th in the final.

At the 2016 Summer Olympics he won a bronze medal after a disqualification of a competitor.
