= Dagnis Iļjins =

Latvian canoeist (born 1992)

Personal information
- Nationality: Latvian
- Born: 20 August 1992 (age 33) Talsi, Latvia
- Height: 1.78 m (5 ft 10 in)
- Weight: 82 kg (181 lb)

Sport
- Country: Latvia
- Sport: Canoe

Dagnis Iļjins (born 20 August 1992) is a Latvian canoeist. He represented his country at the 2016 Summer Olympics.
