= Italy at the 2016 Summer Olympics =

- IOC code: ITA
- NOC: Italian National Olympic Committee
- Website: www.coni.it (in Italian)

in Rio de Janeiro
- Competitors: 314 in 24 sports
- Flag bearers: Federica Pellegrini (opening); Daniele Lupo (closing)
- Medals Ranked 9th: Gold 8 Silver 12 Bronze 8 Total 28

Summer Olympics appearances (overview)
- 1896; 1900; 1904; 1908; 1912; 1920; 1924; 1928; 1932; 1936; 1948; 1952; 1956; 1960; 1964; 1968; 1972; 1976; 1980; 1984; 1988; 1992; 1996; 2000; 2004; 2008; 2012; 2016; 2020; 2024; 2028

Other related appearances
- 1906 Intercalated Games

Italy competed at the 2016 Summer Olympics in Rio de Janeiro, Brazil, from 5 to 21 August 2016. Italy has competed in every Summer Olympics, except the 1904 Summer Olympics in St. Louis.

== Medalists ==
Italy's medalists.

| Medal | Name | Sport | Event | Date |
|---|---|---|---|---|
| Gold | Elia Viviani | Cycling | Men's omnium | August 15 |
| Gold | Niccolò Campriani | Shooting | Men's 50 m air rifle three positions | August 14 |
| Gold | Gregorio Paltrinieri | Swimming | Men's 1500 m freestyle | August 13 |
| Gold | Gabriele Rossetti | Shooting | Men's skeet | August 13 |
| Gold | Diana Bacosi | Shooting | Women's skeet | August 12 |
| Gold | Niccolò Campriani | Shooting | Men's 10 m air rifle | August 8 |
| Gold | Daniele Garozzo | Fencing | Men's foil | August 7 |
| Gold | Fabio Basile | Judo | Men's 66 kg | August 7 |
| Silver | Italy men's national volleyball team: Oleg Antonov; Emanuele Birarelli; Simone Buti; Massimo Colaci; Simone Giannelli; Osmany Juantorena; Filippo Lanza; Matteo Piano; Salvatore Rossini; Pasquale Sottile; Luca Vettori; Ivan Zaytsev | Volleyball | Men's indoor tournament | August 21 |
| Silver | Italy women's national water polo team: Giulia Gorlero; Chiara Tabani; Arianna Garibotti; Elisa Queirolo; Federica Radicchi; Rosaria Aiello; Tania Di Mario; Roberta Bianconi; Giulia Enrica Emmolo; Francesca Pomeri; Aleksandra Cotti; Teresa Frassinetti; Laura Teani | Water polo | Women's tournament | August 19 |
| Silver | Daniele Lupo; Paolo Nicolai | Volleyball | Men's beach volleyball | August 18 |
| Silver | Rachele Bruni | Swimming | Women's 10 km open water | August 15 |
| Silver | Marco Fichera; Enrico Garozzo; Paolo Pizzo; Andrea Santarelli | Fencing | Men's team épée | August 14 |
| Silver | Chiara Cainero | Shooting | Women's skeet | August 12 |
| Silver | Elisa Di Francisca | Fencing | Women's foil | August 10 |
| Silver | Marco Innocenti | Shooting | Men's double trap | August 10 |
| Silver | Giovanni Pellielo | Shooting | Men's trap | August 8 |
| Silver | Odette Giuffrida | Judo | Women's 52 kg | August 7 |
| Silver | Tania Cagnotto; Francesca Dallapé | Diving | Women's 3 m synchronized springboard | August 7 |
| Silver | Rossella Fiamingo | Fencing | Women's épée | August 6 |
| Bronze | Frank Chamizo | Wrestling | Men's freestyle 65 kg | August 21 |
| Bronze | Italy men's national water polo team: Stefano Tempesti; Francesco Di Fulvio; Niccolò Gitto; Pietro Figlioli; Alessandro Velotto; Michael Bodegas; Andrea Fondelli; Valentino Gallo; Christian Presciutti; Nicholas Presciutti; Matteo Aicardi; Alessandro Nora; Marco Del Lungo | Water polo | Men's tournament | August 20 |
| Bronze | Tania Cagnotto | Diving | Women's 3 m springboard | August 14 |
| Bronze | Gabriele Detti | Swimming | Men's 1500 m freestyle | August 13 |
| Bronze | Domenico Montrone; Matteo Castaldo; Matteo Lodo; Giuseppe Vicino | Rowing | Men's four | August 12 |
| Bronze | Marco Di Costanzo; Giovanni Abagnale | Rowing | Men's pair | August 11 |
| Bronze | Elisa Longo Borghini | Cycling | Women's road race | August 7 |
| Bronze | Gabriele Detti | Swimming | Men's 400 m freestyle | August 6 |

Medals by sport
| Sport | 1st place, gold medalist(s) | 2nd place, silver medalist(s) | 3rd place, bronze medalist(s) | Total |
| Shooting | 4 | 3 | 0 | 7 |
| Fencing | 1 | 3 | 0 | 4 |
| Swimming | 1 | 1 | 2 | 4 |
| Judo | 1 | 1 | 0 | 2 |
| Cycling | 1 | 0 | 1 | 2 |
| Diving | 0 | 1 | 1 | 2 |
| Volleyball | 0 | 2 | 0 | 2 |
| Water polo | 0 | 1 | 1 | 2 |
| Rowing | 0 | 0 | 2 | 2 |
| Wrestling | 0 | 0 | 1 | 1 |
| Total | 8 | 12 | 8 | 28 |

Medals by day
| Day | Date | 1st place, gold medalist(s) | 2nd place, silver medalist(s) | 3rd place, bronze medalist(s) | Total |
| 1 | August 6 | 0 | 1 | 1 | 2 |
| 2 | August 7 | 2 | 2 | 1 | 5 |
| 3 | August 8 | 1 | 1 | 0 | 2 |
| 4 | August 9 | 0 | 0 | 0 | 0 |
| 5 | August 10 | 0 | 2 | 0 | 2 |
| 6 | August 11 | 0 | 0 | 1 | 1 |
| 7 | August 12 | 1 | 1 | 1 | 3 |
| 8 | August 13 | 2 | 0 | 1 | 3 |
| 9 | August 14 | 1 | 1 | 1 | 3 |
| 10 | August 15 | 1 | 1 | 0 | 2 |
| 11 | August 16 | 0 | 0 | 0 | 0 |
| 12 | August 17 | 0 | 0 | 0 | 0 |
| 13 | August 18 | 0 | 1 | 0 | 1 |
| 14 | August 19 | 0 | 1 | 0 | 1 |
| 15 | August 20 | 0 | 0 | 1 | 1 |
| 16 | August 21 | 0 | 1 | 1 | 2 |
| | Total | 8 | 12 | 8 | 28 |

Medals by gender
| Gender | 1st place, gold medalist(s) | 2nd place, silver medalist(s) | 3rd place, bronze medalist(s) | Total |
| Male | 7 | 5 | 6 | 18 |
| Female | 1 | 7 | 2 | 10 |
| Mixed | 0 | 0 | 0 | 0 |
| Total | 8 | 12 | 8 | 28 |

Multiple medalists
| Name | Sport | 1st place, gold medalist(s) | 2nd place, silver medalist(s) | 3rd place, bronze medalist(s) | Total |
| Niccolò Campriani | Shooting | 2 | 0 | 0 | 2 |
| Tania Cagnotto | Diving | 0 | 1 | 1 | 2 |
| Gabriele Detti | Swimming | 0 | 0 | 2 | 2 |

== Competitors ==
The following is the list of number of competitors participating in the Games. Note that reserves in fencing, field hockey, football, and handball are not counted as athletes:

| Sport | Men | Women | Total |
|---|---|---|---|
| Archery | 3 | 3 | 6 |
| Athletics | 15 | 23 | 38 |
| Badminton | 0 | 1 | 1 |
| Boxing | 6 | 1 | 7 |
| Canoeing | 7 | 1 | 8 |
| Cycling | 14 | 9 | 23 |
| Diving | 4 | 4 | 8 |
| Equestrian | 4 | 2 | 6 |
| Fencing | 8 | 6 | 14 |
| Golf | 2 | 2 | 4 |
| Gymnastics | 1 | 11 | 12 |
| Judo | 3 | 3 | 6 |
| Modern pentathlon | 2 | 2 | 4 |
| Rowing | 22 | 4 | 26 |
| Sailing | 6 | 7 | 13 |
| Shooting | 10 | 4 | 14 |
| Swimming | 20 | 18 | 38 |
| Synchronized swimming | — | 9 | 9 |
| Tennis | 4 | 3 | 7 |
| Triathlon | 2 | 2 | 4 |
| Volleyball | 16 | 14 | 30 |
| Water polo | 13 | 13 | 26 |
| Weightlifting | 1 | 1 | 2 |
| Wrestling | 2 | 0 | 2 |
| Total | 170 | 144 | 314 |

== Archery ==
Three Italian archers qualified for the men's events after having secured a top eight finish in the men's team recurve at the 2015 World Archery Championships in Copenhagen, Denmark. Another set of three archers qualified for the women's events by virtue of the nation's podium finish in the team recurve competition at the 2016 Archery World Cup meet in Antalya, Turkey.

The full Italian archery team, led by London 2012 champions Marco Galiazzo and Mauro Nespoli was named on July 6, 2016.

Men

| Athlete | Event | Ranking round | | Round of 64 | Round of 32 | Round of 16 | Quarterfinals | Semifinals | Final / BM | |
| Athlete | Event | Score | Seed | Opposition Score | Opposition Score | Opposition Score | Opposition Score | Opposition Score | Opposition Score | Rank |
|---|---|---|---|---|---|---|---|---|---|---|
| Marco Galiazzo | Individual | 651 | 47 | Duenas (CAN); L 5–6 | did not advance | | | | | |
| Mauro Nespoli | Individual | 671 | 16 | Wijaya (INA); W 7–3 | Duzelbayev (KAZ); W 6–0 | Agatha (INA); W 6–0 | Valladont (FRA); L 5–6 | did not advance | | |
| David Pasqualucci | Individual | 685 | 3 | David (MAW); W 6–0 | Fernández (ESP); L 2–6 | did not advance | | | | |
| Marco Galiazzo; Mauro Nespoli; David Pasqualucci | Team | 2007 | 3 | —N/a | | Bye | China; L 0–6 | did not advance | | |

Women

| Athlete | Event | Ranking round | | Round of 64 | Round of 32 | Round of 16 | Quarterfinals | Semifinals | Final / BM | |
| Athlete | Event | Score | Seed | Opposition Score | Opposition Score | Opposition Score | Opposition Score | Opposition Score | Opposition Score | Rank |
|---|---|---|---|---|---|---|---|---|---|---|
| Lucilla Boari | Individual | 651 | 7 | Ingley (AUS); L 1–7 | did not advance | | | | | |
| Claudia Mandia | Individual | 612 | 46 | Brown (USA); L 4–6 | did not advance | | | | | |
| Guendalina Sartori | Individual | 648 | 13 | Aguirre (COL); W 6–0 | Kumari (IND); L 2–6 | did not advance | | | | |
| Lucilla Boari; Claudia Mandia; Guendalina Sartori | Team | 1911 | 6 | —N/a | | Brazil; W 6–0 | China; W 5–3 | Russia; L 3–5 | Chinese Taipei; L 3–5 | 4 |

== Athletics ==
Italian athletes have so far achieved qualifying standards in the following athletics events (up to a maximum of 3 athletes in each event):

Following the end of the qualifying period, a total of 35 athletes (15 men and 20 women) were officially named to Italy's track and field roster for the Games on July 14, 2016, with triple jumper and London 2012 bronze medalist Fabrizio Donato matching the record with sprinter Pietro Mennea as the only men competing in five straight Olympics. A day later, high jumper and London 2012 Olympian Gianmarco Tamberi was forced to withdraw from the team after sustaining a partial rupture of his ankle ligament shortly upon clearing a national record of 2.39 m in Monaco. Three more athletes (Lingua, Magnani, & Malavisi) were added to the team on July 18, bringing the roster size to 38. On 27 July, Jamel Chatbi was suspended for missing out the doping test.

Key
- Note–Ranks given for track events are within the athlete's heat only
- Q = Qualified for the next round
- q = Qualified for the next round as a fastest loser or, in field events, by position without achieving the qualifying target
- NR = National record
- N/A = Round not applicable for the event
- Bye = Athlete not required to compete in round

Track & road events
Men

| Athlete | Event | Heat | | Semifinal | | Final | |
| Athlete | Event | Result | Rank | Result | Rank | Result | Rank |
|---|---|---|---|---|---|---|---|
| Abdoullah Bamoussa | 3000 m steeplechase | 8:42.81 | 12 | —N/a | | did not advance | |
| Giordano Benedetti | 800 m | 1:49.40 | 3 Q | 1:46.41 | 6 | did not advance | |
| Teodorico Caporaso | 50 km walk | —N/a | | | | DSQ | |
| Marco De Luca | 50 km walk | —N/a | | | | 3:54:40 | 21 |
| Eseosa Desalu | 200 m | 20.65 | 5 | did not advance | | | |
| Yuri Floriani | 3000 m steeplechase | 8:40.80 | 10 | —N/a | | did not advance | |
| Matteo Galvan | 200 m | 20.58 | 2 Q | 20.88 | 8 | did not advance | |
| Matteo Galvan | 400 m | 46.07 | 4 | did not advance | | | |
| Matteo Giupponi | 20 km walk | —N/a | | | | 1:20:27 | 8 |
| Matteo Giupponi | 50 km walk | —N/a | | | | DNF | |
| Stefano La Rosa | Marathon | —N/a | | | | 2:18:57 | 57 |
| Davide Manenti | 200 m | 20.51 | 4 | did not advance | | | |
| Daniele Meucci | Marathon | —N/a | | | | DNF | |
| Ruggero Pertile | Marathon | —N/a | | | | 2:17:30 | 38 |

Women

| Athlete | Event | Heat | | Semifinal | | Final | |
| Athlete | Event | Result | Rank | Result | Rank | Result | Rank |
|---|---|---|---|---|---|---|---|
| Catherine Bertone | Marathon | —N/a | | | | 2:33:29 | 25 |
| Marzia Caravelli | 400 m hurdles | 57.77 | 6 | did not advance | | | |
| Maria Benedicta Chigbolu | 400 m | 52.06 | 3 | did not advance | | | |
| Ayomide Folorunso | 400 m hurdles | 55.78 | 3 Q | 56.37 | 7 | did not advance | |
| Eleonora Giorgi | 20 km walk | —N/a | | | | DSQ | |
| Libania Grenot | 400 m | 51.17 | 2 Q | 50.60 | 3 q | 51.25 | 8 |
| Gloria Hooper | 200 m | 23.05 | 6 | did not advance | | | |
| Anna Incerti | Marathon | —N/a | | | | DNF | |
| Veronica Inglese | 10000 m | —N/a | | | | 32:11.67 | 30 |
| Margherita Magnani | 1500 m | 4:09.74 | 11 | did not advance | | | |
| Antonella Palmisano | 20 km walk | —N/a | | | | 1:29:03 | 4 |
| Yadisleidy Pedroso | 400 m hurdles | 55.91 | 4 q | 55.78 | 5 | did not advance | |
| Elisa Rigaudo | 20 km walk | —N/a | | | | 1:31:04 | 11 |
| Yusneysi Santiusti | 800 m | 2:00.45 | 2 Q | 2:00.80 | 7 | did not advance | |
| Valeria Straneo | Marathon | —N/a | | | | 2:29:44 | 13 |
| Chiara Bazzoni; Elena Maria Bonfanti; Maria Benedicta Chigbolu; Libania Grenot; Marta Milani; Maria Enrica Spacca | 4 × 400 m relay | 3:25.16 | 4 q | —N/a | | 3:27.05 | 6 |

Field events
Men

| Athlete | Event | Qualification | | Final | |
| Athlete | Event | Distance | Position | Distance | Position |
|---|---|---|---|---|---|
| Silvano Chesani | High jump | 2.22 | 33 | did not advance | |
| Fabrizio Donato | Triple jump | 16.54 | 17 | did not advance | |
| Marco Lingua | Hammer throw | NM | — | did not advance | |

Women

| Athlete | Event | Qualification | | Final | |
| Athlete | Event | Distance | Position | Distance | Position |
|---|---|---|---|---|---|
| Dariya Derkach | Triple jump | 13.56 | 28 | did not advance | |
| Sonia Malavisi | Pole vault | 4.45 | =21 | did not advance | |
| Desirée Rossit | High jump | 1.94 | =15 Q | 1.88 | 16 |
| Alessia Trost | High jump | 1.94 | =7 Q | 1.93 | 5 |

== Badminton ==
Italy has qualified one badminton player for the women's singles into the Olympic tournament. Having previously competed for Switzerland in Beijing 2008, Jeanine Cicognini claimed her second Olympic spot as one of top 34 individual shuttlers in the BWF World Rankings as of 5 May 2016.

| Athlete | Event | Group Stage | | | Elimination | Quarterfinal | Semifinal | Final / BM | |
| Athlete | Event | Opposition Score | Opposition Score | Rank | Opposition Score | Opposition Score | Opposition Score | Opposition Score | Rank |
|---|---|---|---|---|---|---|---|---|---|
| Jeanine Cicognini | Women's singles | Bae Y-j (KOR); L (11–21, 8–21) | Bayrak (TUR); L (14–21, 7–21) | 3 | did not advance | | | | |

== Boxing ==
Italy has entered six boxers to compete in the following weight classes into the Olympic boxing tournament. Valentino Manfredonia became the first Italian boxer to be selected to the Olympic team with a top two finish in the World Series of Boxing, while two-time Olympic silver medalist Clemente Russo did so in the AIBA Pro Boxing series.

Three further boxers, including London 2012 Olympians Manuel Cappai and bronze medalist Vincenzo Mangiacapre, claimed their Olympic spots at the 2016 European Qualification Tournament in Samsun, Turkey. Meanwhile, Guido Vianello secured an additional place on the Italian roster as the winner and sole recipient of the men's super heavyweight division at the 2016 AIBA World Qualifying Tournament in Baku, Azerbaijan. Carmine Tommasone completed the nation's boxing lineup with his box-off victory at the 2016 APB and WSB Olympic Qualifier in Vargas, Venezuela.

Men

| Athlete | Event | Round of 32 | Round of 16 | Quarterfinals | Semifinals | Final | |
| Athlete | Event | Opposition Result | Opposition Result | Opposition Result | Opposition Result | Opposition Result | Rank |
|---|---|---|---|---|---|---|---|
| Manuel Cappai | Light flyweight | Hernández (USA); L 0–3 | did not advance | | | | |
| Carmine Tommasone | Lightweight | Delgado (MEX); W 3–0 | Álvarez (CUB); L 0–3 | did not advance | | | |
| Vincenzo Mangiacapre | Welterweight | Romero (MEX); W 2–1 | Maestre (VEN); L WO | did not advance | | | |
| Valentino Manfredonia | Light heavyweight | Dauhaliavets (BLR); L 1–2 | did not advance | | | | |
| Clemente Russo | Heavyweight | Bye | Chaktami (TUN); W 3–0 | Tishchenko (RUS); L 0–3 | did not advance | | |
| Guido Vianello | Super heavyweight | Bye | Pero (CUB); L 0–3 | did not advance | | | |

Women

| Athlete | Event | Round of 16 | Quarterfinals | Semifinals | Final | |
| Athlete | Event | Opposition Result | Opposition Result | Opposition Result | Opposition Result | Rank |
|---|---|---|---|---|---|---|
| Irma Testa | Lightweight | Watts (AUS); W 2–1 | Mossely (FRA); L 0–3 | did not advance | | |

== Canoeing ==
=== Slalom ===
Italian canoeists have qualified a maximum of one boat in each of the following classes through the 2015 ICF Canoe Slalom World Championships. Giovanni de Gennaro and Stefanie Horn were selected to the Italian team on May 15, 2016, as a result of their performances at the 2016 European Canoe Slalom Championships.

| Athlete | Event | Preliminary | | | | | | Semifinal | | Final | |
| Athlete | Event | Run 1 | Rank | Run 2 | Rank | Best | Rank | Time | Rank | Time | Rank |
|---|---|---|---|---|---|---|---|---|---|---|---|
| Giovanni De Gennaro | Men's K-1 | 86.85 | 1 | 90.74 | 9 | 86.85 | 1 Q | 95.59 | 9 Q | 91.77 | 7 |
| Stefanie Horn | Women's K-1 | 106.90 | 7 | 99.07 | 1 | 99.07 | 1 Q | 108.30 | 8 Q | 107.22 | 8 |

=== Sprint ===
Italian canoeists have qualified two boats in each of the following distances for the Games by virtue of a top two finish at the 2016 European Qualification Regatta in Duisburg, Germany. As a response to the "multiple positive" cases on doping that provoked a one-year suspension for Belarus and Romania, the men's K-4 1000 m crew (Crenna, Dressino, Ricchetti, & Ripamonti) received a spare berth from the International Canoe Federation for the Italians.

| Athlete | Event | Heats | | Semifinals | | Final | |
| Athlete | Event | Time | Rank | Time | Rank | Time | Rank |
|---|---|---|---|---|---|---|---|
| Alberto Ricchetti | Men's K-1 1000 m | 3:37.610 | 6 | did not advance | | | |
| Manfredi Rizza | Men's K-1 200 m | 34.726 | 2 Q | 34.686 | 3 FA | 36.000 | 5 |
| Carlo Tacchini | Men's C-1 200 m | 41.368 | 3 Q | 41.468 | 4 FB | 40.733 | 15 |
| Carlo Tacchini | Men's C-1 1000 m | 4:04.697 | 4 Q | 4:02.461 | 2 FA | 4:15.368 | 8 |
| Mauro Crenna; Alberto Ricchetti | Men's K-2 200 m | 34.000 | 7 Q | 34.318 | 5 FB | 35.516 | 13 |
| Giulio Dressino; Nicola Ripamonti | Men's K-2 1000 m | 3:30.429 | 5 Q | 3:17.942 | 2 FA | 3:14.883 | 6 |
| Mauro Crenna; Giulio Dressino; Alberto Ricchetti; Nicola Ripamonti | Men's K-4 1000 m | 3:10.266 | 7 Q | 3:03.868 | 5 FB | 3:14.399 | 14 |

Qualification Legend: FA = Qualify to final (medal); FB = Qualify to final B (non-medal)

== Cycling ==
=== Road ===
Italian riders qualified for the following quota places in the men's and women's Olympic road race by virtue of their top 15 final national ranking in the 2015 UCI World Tour (for men) and top 22 in the UCI World Ranking (for women). The road cycling team was officially named to the Italian roster on July 17, 2016.

Men

| Athlete | Event | Time | Rank |
|---|---|---|---|
| Fabio Aru | Road race | 6:10:27 | 6 |
| Damiano Caruso | Road race | 6:22:23 | 40 |
| Damiano Caruso | Time trial | 1:19:46.53 | 27 |
| Alessandro De Marchi | Road race | 6:30:10 | 63 |
| Vincenzo Nibali | Road race | did not finish | |
| Diego Rosa | Road race | did not finish | |

Women

| Athlete | Event | Time | Rank |
|---|---|---|---|
| Giorgia Bronzini | Road race | 4:01:33 | 42 |
| Elena Cecchini | Road race | 3:55:34 | 20 |
| Tatiana Guderzo | Road race | 3:53:46 | 14 |
| Elisa Longo Borghini | Road race | 3:51:27 | 3rd place, bronze medalist(s) |
| Elisa Longo Borghini | Time trial | 44:51.94 | 5 |

=== Track ===
Following the completion of the 2016 UCI Track Cycling World Championships, Italian riders have accumulated spots in the women's team pursuit, as well as the men's omnium. The full Italian track cycling team was named on July 17, 2016.

Pursuit

| Athlete | Event | Qualification | | Semifinals | | Final | |
| Athlete | Event | Time | Rank | Opponent Results | Rank | Opponent Results | Rank |
|---|---|---|---|---|---|---|---|
| Liam Bertazzo; Simone Consonni; Filippo Ganna; Francesco Lamon | Men's team pursuit | 3:59.708 | 5 Q | China; 3:55.724 | 5 | Germany; 4:02.360 | 6 |
| Simona Frapporti; Tatiana Guderzo; Francesca Pattaro; Silvia Valsecchi | Women's team pursuit | 4:25.543 | 7 Q | China; 4:22.964 | 5 | Australia; 4:28.368 | 6 |

Omnium

| Athlete | Event | Scratch race | | Individual pursuit | | | Elimination race | | Time trial | | | Flying lap | | | Points race | | Total points | Rank |
| Athlete | Event | Rank | Points | Time | Rank | Points | Rank | Points | Time | Rank | Points | Time | Rank | Points | Points | Rank | Total points | Rank |
|---|---|---|---|---|---|---|---|---|---|---|---|---|---|---|---|---|---|---|
| Elia Viviani | Men's omnium | 7 | 28 | 4:17.453 | 3 | 36 | 1 | 40 | 1:02.338 | 3 | 36 | 12.660 | 2 | 38 | 29 | 5 | 207 | 1st place, gold medalist(s) |

=== Mountain biking ===
Italian mountain bikers qualified for three men's and one women's quota place into the Olympic cross-country race, as a result of the nation's fifth-place finish for men and fourteenth for women, respectively, in the UCI Olympic Ranking List of May 25, 2016. The mountain biking team, highlighted by London 2012 bronze medalist Marco Aurelio Fontana, was named to the Olympic roster on June 1, 2016.

| Athlete | Event | Time | Rank |
|---|---|---|---|
| Luca Braidot | Men's cross-country | 1:36:25 | 7 |
| Marco Aurelio Fontana | Men's cross-country | 1:40:25 | 20 |
| Andrea Tiberi | Men's cross-country | 1:39:33 | 19 |
| Eva Lechner | Women's cross-country | 1:38:45 | 18 |

== Diving ==
Italian divers qualified for the following individual spots and synchronized teams at the Olympics through the 2015 FINA World Championships and the 2016 FINA World Cup series.

Men

| Athlete | Event | Preliminaries | | Semifinals | | Final | |
| Athlete | Event | Points | Rank | Points | Rank | Points | Rank |
|---|---|---|---|---|---|---|---|
| Michele Benedetti | 3 m springboard | 390.85 | 17 Q | 387.30 | 13 | did not advance | |
| Andrea Chiarabini | 3 m springboard | 350.40 | 28 | did not advance | | | |
| Maicol Verzotto | 10 m platform | 313.10 | 27 | did not advance | | | |
| Andrea Chiarabini; Giovanni Tocci | 3 m synchronized springboard | —N/a | | | | 395.19 | 6 |

Women

| Athlete | Event | Preliminaries | | Semifinals | | Final | |
| Athlete | Event | Points | Rank | Points | Rank | Points | Rank |
|---|---|---|---|---|---|---|---|
| Tania Cagnotto | 3 m springboard | 347.30 | 4 Q | 324.40 | 7 Q | 372.80 | 3rd place, bronze medalist(s) |
| Maria Marconi | 3 m springboard | 292.95 | 19 | did not advance | | | |
| Noemi Batki | 10 m platform | 256.90 | 26 | did not advance | | | |
| Tania Cagnotto; Francesca Dallapé | 3 m synchronized springboard | —N/a | | | | 313.83 | 2nd place, silver medalist(s) |

== Equestrian ==
Italy has fielded a composite squad of three riders into the Olympic team eventing by virtue of the following results in the individual FEI Olympic rankings: a top finish from South Western Europe, and two top nine finishes from the combined overall FEI Olympic rankings. One dressage and jumping rider has been added each to the squad into the Olympic equestrian competition by virtue of their top six and top four finishes, respectively, outside the group selection in the individual FEI Olympic Rankings.

On June 28, 2016, the International Federation for Equestrian Sports (FEI) awarded an additional berth to the fourth Italian eventing rider, as the next highest-ranked eligible individual, not yet qualified, in the FEI Olympic rankings, after Belarus rejected the Olympic spot.

=== Dressage ===
| Athlete | Horse | Event | Grand Prix | | Grand Prix Special | | Grand Prix Freestyle | | Overall | |
| Athlete | Horse | Event | Score | Rank | Score | Rank | Technical | Artistic | Score | Rank |
|---|---|---|---|---|---|---|---|---|---|---|
| Valentina Truppa | Chablis | Individual | 65.971 | 52 | did not advance | | | | | |

=== Eventing ===
| Athlete | Horse | Event | Dressage | | Cross-country | | | Jumping | | | | | | Total | |
| Athlete | Horse | Event | Dressage | | Cross-country | | | Qualifier | | | Final | | | Total | |
| Athlete | Horse | Event | Penalties | Rank | Penalties | Total | Rank | Penalties | Total | Rank | Penalties | Total | Rank | Penalties | Rank |
|---|---|---|---|---|---|---|---|---|---|---|---|---|---|---|---|
| Stefano Brecciaroli | Apollo WD Wendi Kurt Hoev | Individual | 41.90 | 10 | Eliminated | | | did not advance | | | | | | | |
| Luca Roman | Castlewoods Jake | Individual | 50.80 | 46 | 71.60 | 122.40 | 40 | 16.00 | 138.00 | 40 | Did non advance | | | | |
| Pietro Roman | Barraduff | Individual | 48.20 | 38 | 20.00 | 68.20 | 23 | 14.00 | 82.20 | 24 Q | 4.00 | 86.20 | 23 | 86.20 | 23 |
| Arianna Schivo | Quefira de l'Ormeau | Individual | 55.00 # | 54 | 50.40 | 105.40 | 36 | 4.00 | 109.40 | 34 | Did non advance | | | | |
| Stefano Brecciaroli; Luca Roman; Pietro Roman; Arianna Schivo | See above | Team | 140.90 | 8 | 142.00 | 296.00 | 8 | 34.00 | 330.00 | 9 | —N/a | | | 330.00 | 9 |

=== Jumping ===
| Athlete | Horse | Event | Qualification | | | | | | | | Final | | | | | Total | |
| Athlete | Horse | Event | Round 1 | | Round 2 | | | Round 3 | | | Round A | | Round B | | | Total | |
| Athlete | Horse | Event | Penalties | Rank | Penalties | Total | Rank | Penalties | Total | Rank | Penalties | Rank | Penalties | Total | Rank | Penalties | Rank |
|---|---|---|---|---|---|---|---|---|---|---|---|---|---|---|---|---|---|
| Emanuele Gaudiano | Caspar | Individual | 27 | 67 | did not advance | | | | | | | | | | | | |

== Fencing ==
Italian fencers have qualified a full squad each in the men's team épée and men's team foil by virtue of their top 4 national finish in the FIE Olympic Team Rankings, while the women's sabre team has claimed the spot as the highest ranking team from Europe outside the world's top four.

Multiple Olympic men's sabre medalists Diego Occhiuzzi and Aldo Montano, along with London 2012 champion Elisa Di Francisca and runner-up Arianna Errigo, both in women's foil, claimed their spots on the Italian team by finishing among the top 14 fencers in the FIE Adjusted Official Rankings, while Rossella Fiamingo did the same feat in women's épée as the highest-ranked fencer coming from the Europe zone.

The fencing team was officially selected to the Italian roster for the Games on June 27, 2016.

Men

| Athlete | Event | Round of 64 | Round of 32 | Round of 16 | Quarterfinal | Semifinal | Final / BM | |
| Athlete | Event | Opposition Score | Opposition Score | Opposition Score | Opposition Score | Opposition Score | Opposition Score | Rank |
|---|---|---|---|---|---|---|---|---|
| Marco Fichera | Épée | Bye | Minobe (JPN); L 8–15 | did not advance | | | | |
| Enrico Garozzo | Épée | Bye | Jung J-s (KOR); W 15–11 | Park S-y (KOR); L 12–15 | did not advance | | | |
| Paolo Pizzo | Épée | Bye | Heinzer (SUI); L 11–15 | did not advance | | | | |
| Marco Fichera; Enrico Garozzo; Paolo Pizzo; Andrea Santarelli | Team épée | —N/a | | Bye | Switzerland; W 45–32 | Ukraine; W 45–33 | France; L 31–45 | 2nd place, silver medalist(s) |
| Giorgio Avola | Foil | Bye | Gómez (MEX); W 15–5 | Joppich (GER); W 15–13 | Massialas (USA); L 14–15 | did not advance | | |
| Andrea Cassarà | Foil | Bye | Cadot (FRA); W 15–14 | Kruse (GBR); L 12–15 | did not advance | | | |
| Daniele Garozzo | Foil | Bye | Ayad (EGY); W 15–8 | Abouelkassem (EGY); W 15–13 | Toldo (BRA); W 15–8 | Safin (RUS); W 15–8 | Massialas (USA); W 15–11 | 1st place, gold medalist(s) |
| Giorgio Avola; Andrea Cassarà; Daniele Garozzo; Andrea Baldini | Team foil | —N/a | | | Brazil; W 45–27 | France; L 30–45 | United States; L 31–45 | 4 |
| Aldo Montano | Sabre | —N/a | F Ferjani (TUN); W 15–11 | Kovalev (RUS); L 13–15 | did not advance | | | |
| Diego Occhiuzzi | Sabre | —N/a | Vū T A (VIE); L 12–15 | did not advance | | | | |

Women

| Athlete | Event | Round of 64 | Round of 32 | Round of 16 | Quarterfinal | Semifinal | Final / BM | |
| Athlete | Event | Opposition Score | Opposition Score | Opposition Score | Opposition Score | Opposition Score | Opposition Score | Rank |
|---|---|---|---|---|---|---|---|---|
| Rossella Fiamingo | Épée | Bye | Mackinnon (CAN); W 15–8 | Kong (HKG); W 15–11 | Choi I-j (KOR); W 15–8 | Sun Yw (CHN); W 12–11 | Szász (HUN); L 13–15 | 2nd place, silver medalist(s) |
| Elisa Di Francisca | Foil | Bye | Lin P H (HKG); W 8–15 | Łyczbińska (POL); W 15–6 | Liu Ys (CHN); W 15–10 | Boubakri (TUN); W 12–9 | Deriglazova (RUS); L 11–12 | 2nd place, silver medalist(s) |
| Arianna Errigo | Foil | Bye | Đỗ T A (VIE); W 9–15 | Harvey (CAN); L 11–15 | did not advance | | | |
| Rossella Gregorio | Sabre | Bye | Komashchuk (UKR); L 14–15 | did not advance | | | | |
| Loreta Gulotta | Sabre | Bye | Socha (POL); W 15–10 | Kim J-y (KOR); W 15–13 | Kharlan (UKR); L 4–15 | did not advance | | |
| Irene Vecchi | Sabre | Bye | Lembach (FRA); L 11–15 | did not advance | | | | |
| Rossella Gregorio; Loreta Gulotta; Irene Vecchi; Ilaria Bianco | Team sabre | —N/a | | | France; W 45–36 | Ukraine; L 42–45 | United States; L 30–45 | 4 |

== Golf ==
Italy has entered four golfers (two per gender) into the Olympic tournament. Nino Bertasio (world no. 299), Matteo Manassero (world no. 342), Giulia Molinaro (world no. 251), and Giulia Sergas (world no. 326) qualified directly among the top 60 eligible players for their respective individual events based on the IGF World Rankings as of 11 July 2016.

| Athlete | Event | Round 1 | Round 2 | Round 3 | Round 4 | Total | | |
| Athlete | Event | Score | Score | Score | Score | Score | Par | Rank |
|---|---|---|---|---|---|---|---|---|
| Nino Bertasio | Men's | 72 | 72 | 71 | 68 | 283 | −1 | =30 |
| Matteo Manassero | Men's | 69 | 73 | 71 | 69 | 282 | −2 | =27 |
| Giulia Molinaro | Women's | 78 | 78 | 74 | 70 | 300 | +16 | =53 |
| Giulia Sergas | Women's | 77 | 74 | 77 | 74 | 302 | +18 | 55 |

== Gymnastics ==
=== Artistic ===
Italy fielded a full squad of six artistic gymnasts (one man and five women) into the Olympic competition. The women's team qualified through a top eight finish at the 2015 World Artistic Gymnastics Championships in Glasgow. Meanwhile, Ludovico Edalli secured his Olympic spot as a lone Italian male gymnast in the apparatus and individual all-around events at the Olympic Test Event in Rio de Janeiro. The artistic gymnastics team was named to the Italian roster for the Games on July 10, 2016.

Men

| Athlete | Event | Qualification | | | | | | | | Final | | | | | | | |
| Athlete | Event | Apparatus | | | | | | Total | Rank | Apparatus | | | | | | Total | Rank |
| Athlete | Event | F | PH | R | V | PB | HB | Total | Rank | F | PH | R | V | PB | HB | Total | Rank |
|---|---|---|---|---|---|---|---|---|---|---|---|---|---|---|---|---|---|
| Ludovico Edalli | All-around | 12.433 | 13.333 | 13.666 | 13.933 | 14.400 | 14.033 | 81.798 | 44 | did not advance | | | | | | | |

Women
Team

| Athlete | Event | Qualification | | | | | | Final | | | | | |
| Athlete | Event | Apparatus | | | | Total | Rank | Apparatus | | | | Total | Rank |
| Athlete | Event | V | UB | BB | F | Total | Rank | V | UB | BB | F | Total | Rank |
|---|---|---|---|---|---|---|---|---|---|---|---|---|---|
| Erika Fasana | Team | —N/a | 14.200 | 12.933 | 14.333 Q | —N/a | | did not advance | | | | | |
| Carlotta Ferlito | Team | 14.300 | 14.033 | 13.233 | 14.033 | 55.599 | 22 Q | did not advance | | | | | |
| Vanessa Ferrari | Team | 14.533 | 13.866 | 12.000 | 14.866 Q | 55.265 | 24 Q | did not advance | | | | | |
| Elisa Meneghini | Team | 14.166 | —N/a | 14.166 | 14.233 | —N/a | | did not advance | | | | | |
| Martina Rizzelli | Team | 14.533 | 14.033 | —N/a | | | | did not advance | | | | | |
| Total | Team | 43.366 | 42.266 | 40.332 | 43.432 | 169.396 | 10 | did not advance | | | | | |

Individual finals

| Athlete | Event | Apparatus | | | | Total | Rank |
| Athlete | Event | V | UB | BB | F | Total | Rank |
|---|---|---|---|---|---|---|---|
| Carlotta Ferlito | All-around | 14.733 | 14.100 | 14.000 | 14.125 | 56.958 | 12 |
| Vanessa Ferrari | All-around | 14.633 | 14.033 | 13.800 | 14.075 | 56.541 | 16 |
| Vanessa Ferrari | Floor | —N/a | | | 14.766 | —N/a | 4 |
| Erika Fasana | Floor | —N/a | | | 14.533 | —N/a | 6 |

=== Rhythmic ===
Italy has qualified a squad of rhythmic gymnasts for the group all-around by finishing in the top 10 (for group) at the 2015 World Championships in Stuttgart, Germany. Meanwhile, an additional Olympic berth was awarded to the Italian female gymnast, who participated in the individual all-around at the Olympic Test Event in Rio de Janeiro. The rhythmic gymnastics team, led by London 2012 bronze medalist Marta Pagnini, was named on July 10, 2016.

| Athlete | Event | Qualification | | | | | | Final | | | | | |
| Athlete | Event | Hoop | Ball | Clubs | Ribbon | Total | Rank | Hoop | Ball | Clubs | Ribbon | Total | Rank |
|---|---|---|---|---|---|---|---|---|---|---|---|---|---|
| Veronica Bertolini | Individual | 17.516 | 16.550 | 17.541 | 16.400 | 68.007 | 19 | did not advance | | | | | |

| Athlete | Event | Qualification | | | | Final | | | |
| Athlete | Event | 5 ribbons | 3 clubs 2 hoops | Total | Rank | 5 ribbons | 3 clubs 2 hoops | Total | Rank |
|---|---|---|---|---|---|---|---|---|---|
| Martina Centofanti; Sofia Lodi; Alessia Maurelli; Marta Pagnini; Camilla Patriarca | Team | 17.516 | 17.833 | 35.349 | 4 Q | 17.516 | 18.033 | 35.549 | 4 |

== Judo ==
Italy has qualified a total of six judokas for each of the following weight classes at the Games. Elios Manzi, Fabio Basile, Odette Giuffrida, and London 2012 Olympian Edwige Gwend were ranked among the top 22 eligible judokas for men and top 14 for women in the IJF World Ranking List of May 30, 2016, while Matteo Marconcini at men's half-middleweight (81 kg) earned a continental quota spot from the European region, as the highest-ranked Italian judoka outside of direct qualifying position.

On June 30, 2016, the International Judo Federation awarded a spare Olympic berth freed up by Palau to Valentina Moscatt at women's extra-lightweight (48 kg), as one of the highest-ranked eligible judokas, not yet qualified, across all genders and continents on the list.

| Athlete | Event | Round of 64 | Round of 32 | Round of 16 | Quarterfinals | Semifinals | Repechage | Final / BM | |
| Athlete | Event | Opposition Result | Opposition Result | Opposition Result | Opposition Result | Opposition Result | Opposition Result | Opposition Result | Rank |
|---|---|---|---|---|---|---|---|---|---|
| Elios Manzi | Men's −60 kg | Bye | Kim W-j (KOR); L 000–001 | did not advance | | | | | |
| Fabio Basile | Men's −66 kg | Bye | Seidl (GER); W 100–000 | Shikhalizade (AZE); W 110–000 | Davaadorj (MGL); W 100–000 | Gomboč (SLO); W 000–000 S | Bye | An B-u (KOR); W 100–000 | 1st place, gold medalist(s) |
| Matteo Marconcini | Men's −81 kg | Nakano (PHI); W 100–000 | Bottieau (BEL); W 000–000 S | Duminică (MDA); W 110–010 | Tchrikishvili (GEO); L 000–011 | Did not advance | Ivanov (BUL); W 100–000 | Toma (UAE); L 000–100 | 5 |
| Valentina Moscatt | Women's −48 kg | —N/a | Văn N T (VIE); L 000–000 S | did not advance | | | | | |
| Odette Giuffrida | Women's −52 kg | —N/a | Bye | Kräh (GER); W 001–000 | Chițu (ROU); W 001–000 | Ma Yn (CHN); W 000–000 S | Bye | Kelmendi (KOS); L 000–001 | 2nd place, silver medalist(s) |
| Edwige Gwend | Women's −63 kg | —N/a | Hermansson (SWE); W 101–000 | Trstenjak (SLO); L 000–000 S | did not advance | | | | |

== Modern pentathlon ==
Italy has qualified a total of four modern pentathletes for the following events at the Games. Riccardo De Luca secured a selection in the men's event by winning the 2015 UIPM World Cup Final in Minsk, Belarus, while Alice Sotero gained a place in the women's event through the European Championships. Pierpaolo Petroni and London 2012 Olympian Claudia Cesarini were ranked among the top 10 modern pentathletes, not yet qualified, in their respective events based on the UIPM World Rankings as of June 1, 2016.

| Athlete | Event | Fencing (épée one touch) | | | | Swimming (200 m freestyle) | | | Riding (show jumping) | | | Combined: shooting/running (10 m air pistol)/(3200 m) | | | Total points | Final rank |
| Athlete | Event | RR | BR | Rank | MP points | Time | Rank | MP points | Penalties | Rank | MP points | Time | Rank | MP Points | Total points | Final rank |
|---|---|---|---|---|---|---|---|---|---|---|---|---|---|---|---|---|
| Riccardo De Luca | Men's | 20–15 | 2 | 9 | 222 | 2:09.36 | 34 | 312 | 0 | 6 | 300 | 11:07.23 | 6 | 633 | 1467 | 5 |
| Pierpaolo Petroni | Men's | 13–22 | 1 | 31 | 179 | 2:05.51 | 21 | 324 | 7 | 7 | 293 | 11:39.60 | 23 | 601 | 1397 | 24 |
| Claudia Cesarini | Women's | 17–18 | 3 | 16 | 205 | 2:20.85 | 27 | 278 | 39 | 27 | 261 | 13:04.34 | 21 | 516 | 1260 | 24 |
| Alice Sotero | Women's | 20–15 | 1 | 9 | 221 | 2:12.63 | 8 | 303 | 21 | 23 | 279 | 13:00.47 | 18 | 520 | 1323 | 8 |

== Rowing ==
Italy has qualified a total of eight boats for each of the following rowing classes into the Olympic regatta. Five rowing crews confirmed Olympic places for their boats at the 2015 FISA World Championships in Lac d'Aiguebelette, France, while the women's pair rowers added one more boat to the Italian roster as a result of their top four finish at the 2016 European & Final Qualification Regatta in Lucerne, Switzerland.

A total of 16 rowers (14 men and 2 women), highlighted by London 2012 silver medalist Romano Battisti (men's double sculls), were officially named to the Italian roster for the Games on July 13, 2016.

On July 26, 2016, two more boats (men's eight and women's lightweight double sculls) were awarded to the Italian rowing team, as a response to the removal of four boats held by the Russians from FISA due to their previous doping bans and their implications in the "disappearing positive methodology" set out in the McClaren Report on Russia's state-sponsored doping.

Men

| Athlete | Event | Heats | | Repechage | | Semifinals | | Final | |
| Athlete | Event | Time | Rank | Time | Rank | Time | Rank | Time | Rank |
|---|---|---|---|---|---|---|---|---|---|
| Giovanni Abagnale; Marco Di Costanzo | Pair | 6:46.04 | 2 SA/B | Bye | | 6:24.96 | 1 FA | 7:04.52 | 3rd place, bronze medalist(s) |
| Romano Battisti; Francesco Fossi | Double sculls | 6:42.33 | 3 SA/B | Bye | | 6:15.24 | 2 FA | 6:57.10 | 4 |
| Marcello Miani; Andrea Micheletti | Lightweight double sculls | 6:24.10 | 2 SA/B | Bye | | 6:40.45 | 4 FB | 6:29.52 | 8 |
| Matteo Castaldo; Matteo Lodo; Domenico Montrone; Giuseppe Vicino | Four | 5:56.01 | 1 SA/B | Bye | | 6:16.54 | 3 FA | 6:03.85 | 3rd place, bronze medalist(s) |
| Martino Goretti; Livio La Padula; Stefano Oppo; Pietro Ruta | Lightweight four | 6:03.26 | 1 SA/B | Bye | | 6:06.54 | 1 FA | 6:25.52 | 4 |
| Luca Agamennoni; Vincenzo Capelli; Pierpaolo Frattini; Fabio Infimo; Emanuele Liuzzi; Mario Paonessa; Matteo Stefanini; Simone Venier; Enrico D'Aniello (cox) | Eight | 5:52.83 | 4 R | 6:05.12 | 5 | —N/a | | did not advance | |

Women

| Athlete | Event | Heats | | Repechage | | Semifinals | | Final | |
| Athlete | Event | Time | Rank | Time | Rank | Time | Rank | Time | Rank |
|---|---|---|---|---|---|---|---|---|---|
| Sara Bertolasi; Alessandra Patelli | Pair | 7:13.06 | 4 R | 7:58.89 | 2 SA/B | 7:45.44 | 6 FB | 7:24.51 | 11 |
| Laura Milani; Valentina Rodini | Lightweight double sculls | 7:09.12 | 4 R | 8:03.03 | 3 SC/D | 8:11.21 | 1 FC | 7:36.64 | 13 |

Qualification Legend: FA=Final A (medal); FB=Final B (non-medal); FC=Final C (non-medal); FD=Final D (non-medal); FE=Final E (non-medal); FF=Final F (non-medal); SA/B=Semifinals A/B; SC/D=Semifinals C/D; SE/F=Semifinals E/F; QF=Quarterfinals; R=Repechage

== Sailing ==
Italian sailors have qualified one boat in each of the following classes through the 2014 ISAF Sailing World Championships, the individual fleet Worlds, and European qualifying regattas.

Following their podium finish at the 2015 49er & 49erFX World Championships, 2012 Olympians Giulia Conti and Francesca Clapcich became the first Italian sailors to be selected for Rio regatta. By the end of 2015, two more crews joined Conti and Clapcich in the Italian Olympic sailing squad: Vittorio Bissaro and Silvia Sicouri (Nacra 17), and Flavia Tartaglini (RS:X). Two further sailors (Camboni & Marrai) sealed their Olympic spots at the Princess Sofia Trophy regatta, while the remaining sailing crews (except the men's 470) rounded out the Italian selection on the last week of May 2016. The sailing crews were formally named to the Olympic roster on June 2, 2016.

Men

| Athlete | Event | Race | | | | | | | | | | | | | Net points | Final rank |
| Athlete | Event | 1 | 2 | 3 | 4 | 5 | 6 | 7 | 8 | 9 | 10 | 11 | 12 | M* | Net points | Final rank |
|---|---|---|---|---|---|---|---|---|---|---|---|---|---|---|---|---|
| Mattia Camboni | RS:X | 11 | 13 | 4 | ~~37~~ | 37 | 9 | 10 | 21 | 3 | 3 | 5 | 1 | 20 | 137 | 10 |
| Francesco Marrai | Laser | ~~39~~ | 11 | 18 | 5 | 22 | 11 | 5 | 1 | 13 | 23 | —N/a | | EL | 109 | 12 |
| Giorgio Poggi | Finn | 11 | 4 | 16 | 11 | 18 | 15 | 7 | ~~19~~ | 11 | 18 | —N/a | | EL | 111 | 18 |
| Ruggero Tita; Pietro Zucchetti | 49er | 7 | ~~20~~ | 19 | 11 | 5 | 8 | 10 | 9 | 6 | 7 | 10 | 19 | EL | 120 | 14 |

Women

| Athlete | Event | Race | | | | | | | | | | | | | Net points | Final rank |
| Athlete | Event | 1 | 2 | 3 | 4 | 5 | 6 | 7 | 8 | 9 | 10 | 11 | 12 | M* | Net points | Final rank |
|---|---|---|---|---|---|---|---|---|---|---|---|---|---|---|---|---|
| Flavia Tartaglini | RS:X | ~~12~~ | 1 | 5 | 1 | 1 | 4 | 1 | 12 | 10 | 9 | 5 | 6 | 16 | 71 | 6 |
| Silvia Zennaro | Laser Radial | 10 | 24 | 23 | 18 | 15 | 21 | 15 | 16 | ~~28~~ | 17 | —N/a | | EL | 163 | 22 |
| Elena Berta; Alice Sinno | 470 | 13 | 19 | 16 | 14 | 8 | 15 | 16 | 19 | 15 | ~~20~~ | —N/a | | EL | 135 | 19 |
| Francesca Clapcich; Giulia Conti | 49erFX | 3 | 7 | 7 | 6 | 10 | 8 | ~~15~~ | 13 | 5 | 6 | 4 | 7 | 6 | 82 | 5 |

Mixed

| Athlete | Event | Race | | | | | | | | | | | | | Net points | Final rank |
| Athlete | Event | 1 | 2 | 3 | 4 | 5 | 6 | 7 | 8 | 9 | 10 | 11 | 12 | M* | Net points | Final rank |
|---|---|---|---|---|---|---|---|---|---|---|---|---|---|---|---|---|
| Vittorio Bissaro; Silvia Sicouri | Nacra 17 | 10 | 12 | 3 | 3 | 3 | 7 | 6 | ~~13~~ | 13 | 2 | 7 | 4 | 14 | 85 | 5 |

M = Medal race; EL = Eliminated – did not advance into the medal race

== Shooting ==
Italian shooters have achieved quota places for the following events by virtue of their best finishes at the 2014 and 2015 ISSF World Championships, the 2015 ISSF World Cup series, and European Championships or Games, as long as they obtained a minimum qualifying score (MQS) by March 31, 2016.

On February 19, 2016, the Italian Shotgun Federation officially announced the names of the nine shooters to compete in Rio 2016, including Olympic champions Jessica Rossi in women's trap (2012) and Chiara Cainero in women's skeet (2008), 2012 Olympic runner-up Massimo Fabbrizi, and triple Olympic medalist Giovanni Pellielo, who has been set to appear at his seventh Games, both in men's trap. Meanwhile, five other shooters competing in the rifle and pistol events were named to the Olympic roster, with Niccolò Campriani aiming to defend his title in the men's 50 m rifle 3 positions.

Italy secured an additional quota place in the men's 50 m pistol at the 2015 European Shooting Championships, but the Italian Olympic Committee chose to exchange it with the men's 25 m rapid fire pistol instead based on performances throughout the qualifying period. The slot was awarded to rookie Riccardo Mazzetti.

Men

| Athlete | Event | Qualification | | Semifinal | | Final / BM | |
| Athlete | Event | Points | Rank | Points | Rank | Points | Rank |
|---|---|---|---|---|---|---|---|
| Antonino Barillà | Double trap | 125 | 16 | did not advance | | | |
| Niccolò Campriani | 10 m air rifle | 630.2 OR | 1 Q | —N/a | | 206.1 OR | 1st place, gold medalist(s) |
| Niccolò Campriani | 50 m rifle prone | 625.3 | 6 Q | —N/a | | 102.8 | 7 |
| Niccolò Campriani | 50 m rifle 3 positions | 1174 | 8 Q | —N/a | | 458.8 OR | 1st place, gold medalist(s) |
| Marco De Nicolo | 10 m air rifle | 620.5 | 30 | —N/a | | did not advance | |
| Marco De Nicolo | 50 m rifle prone | 626.0 | 5 Q | —N/a | | 123.6 | 6 |
| Marco De Nicolo | 50 m rifle 3 positions | 1168 | 27 | —N/a | | did not advance | |
| Massimo Fabbrizi | Trap | 118 | 6 Q | 11 | 6 | did not advance | |
| Giuseppe Giordano | 10 m air pistol | 580 | 5 Q | —N/a | | 118.4 | 6 |
| Giuseppe Giordano | 50 m pistol | 547 | 26 | —N/a | | did not advance | |
| Marco Innocenti | Double trap | 136 | 5 Q | 27 | 2 Q | 24 | 2nd place, silver medalist(s) |
| Luigi Lodde | Skeet | 116 | 24 | did not advance | | | |
| Riccardo Mazzetti | 25 m rapid fire pistol | 586 | 4 Q | —N/a | | 10 | 6 |
| Giovanni Pellielo | Trap | 122 | 1 Q | 14 | 2 Q | 13 (+3) | 2nd place, silver medalist(s) |
| Gabriele Rossetti | Skeet | 121 | 5 Q | 16 | 1 Q | 16 | 1st place, gold medalist(s) |

Women

| Athlete | Event | Qualification | | Semifinal | | Final / BM | |
| Athlete | Event | Points | Rank | Points | Rank | Points | Rank |
|---|---|---|---|---|---|---|---|
| Diana Bacosi | Skeet | 72 | 3 Q | 15 | 2 Q | 15 | 1st place, gold medalist(s) |
| Chiara Cainero | Skeet | 70 | 4 Q | 16 | 1 Q | 14 | 2nd place, silver medalist(s) |
| Jessica Rossi | Trap | 69 | 2 Q | 10 | 6 | did not advance | |
| Petra Zublasing | 10 m air rifle | 411.6 | 34 | —N/a | | did not advance | |
| Petra Zublasing | 50 m rifle 3 positions | 589 OR | 1 Q | —N/a | | 437.7 | 4 |

Qualification Legend: Q = Qualify for the next round; q = Qualify for the bronze medal (shotgun)

== Swimming ==
Italian swimmers have so far achieved qualifying standards in the following events (up to a maximum of 2 swimmers in each event at the Olympic Qualifying Time (OQT), and potentially 1 at the Olympic Selection Time (OST)):

With the successful podium finish at the 2015 FINA World Championships, long-freestyle distance aces Gregorio Paltrinieri and upcoming four-time Olympian Federica Pellegrini became the first Italian swimmers to be selected to the Olympic team for Rio 2016. The rest of the Italian swimmers must attain the federation's entry standards at three selection meets to confirm their places for the Games: Italian Nationals in Riccione (April 19 to 23), European Championships in London (May 16 to 22), and Sette Colli trophy in Rome (June 24 to 26).

On June 30, 2016, the Italian Olympic Committee nominated a total of 38 swimmers (20 men and 18 women) for the Games. Eighteen of them, including Paltrinieri and Pellegrini, were directly qualified under the federation's entry standards in three-meet selection process, while others were added to the roster upon the federation's discretionary selection criteria.

Men

| Athlete | Event | Heat | | Semifinal | | Final | |
| Athlete | Event | Time | Rank | Time | Rank | Time | Rank |
|---|---|---|---|---|---|---|---|
| Marco Belotti | 200 m freestyle | 1:48.71 | 33 | did not advance | | | |
| Federico Bocchia | 50 m freestyle | 22.54 | 37 | did not advance | | | |
| Piero Codia | 100 m butterfly | 51.72 | 6 Q | 51.82 | 11 | did not advance | |
| Andrea Mitchell D'Arrigo | 200 m freestyle | 1:47.46 | 23 | did not advance | | | |
| Gabriele Detti | 400 m freestyle | 3:43.94 | 3 Q | —N/a | | 3:43.49 | 3rd place, bronze medalist(s) |
| Gabriele Detti | 1500 m freestyle | 14:48.68 | 5 Q | —N/a | | 14:40.86 | 3rd place, bronze medalist(s) |
| Luca Dotto | 50 m freestyle | 21.87 | 9 Q | 21.84 | 9 | did not advance | |
| Luca Dotto | 100 m freestyle | 48.47 | 10 Q | 48.49 | 12 | did not advance | |
| Filippo Magnini | 100 m freestyle | 49.40 | 37 | did not advance | | | |
| Luca Marin | 400 m individual medley | 4:17.88 | 16 | —N/a | | did not advance | |
| Gregorio Paltrinieri | 1500 m freestyle | 14:44.51 | 1 Q | —N/a | | 14:34.57 | 1st place, gold medalist(s) |
| Luca Pizzini | 200 m breaststroke | 2:11.26 | 16 Q | 2:11.53 | 14 | did not advance | |
| Matteo Rivolta | 100 m butterfly | 52.67 | 25 | did not advance | | | |
| Simone Ruffini | 10 km open water | —N/a | | | | 1:53:03.5 | 6 |
| Simone Sabbioni | 100 m backstroke | 54.91 | 28 | did not advance | | | |
| Andrea Toniato | 100 m breaststroke | 1:00.45 | 22 | did not advance | | | |
| Federico Turrini | 200 m individual medley | DNS | | did not advance | | | |
| Federico Turrini | 400 m individual medley | 4:18.39 | 20 | —N/a | | did not advance | |
| Federico Vanelli | 10 km open water | —N/a | | | | 1:53:03.9 | 7 |
| Luca Dotto; Luca Leonardi; Filippo Magnini; Marco Orsi; Michele Santucci | 4 × 100 m freestyle relay | 3:14.22 | 9 | —N/a | | did not advance | |
| Marco Belotti; Andrea Mitchell D'Arrigo; Gabriele Detti; Alex Di Giorgio | 4 × 200 m freestyle relay | 7:09.20 | 9 | —N/a | | did not advance | |
| Luca Dotto; Simone Sabbioni; Matteo Rivolta; Andrea Toniato | 4 × 100 m medley relay | 3:34.85 | 11 | —N/a | | did not advance | |

Women

| Athlete | Event | Heat | | Semifinal | | Final | |
| Athlete | Event | Time | Rank | Time | Rank | Time | Rank |
|---|---|---|---|---|---|---|---|
| Ilaria Bianchi | 100 m butterfly | 58.48 | 20 | did not advance | | | |
| Rachele Bruni | 10 km open water | —N/a | | | | 1:56:49.5 | 2nd place, silver medalist(s) |
| Diletta Carli | 400 m freestyle | 4:17.15 | 27 | —N/a | | did not advance | |
| Martina Carraro | 100 m breaststroke | 1:07.56 | 20 | did not advance | | | |
| Arianna Castiglioni | 100 m breaststroke | 1:07.32 | 17 | did not advance | | | |
| Martina De Memme | 800 m freestyle | DNS | | —N/a | | did not advance | |
| Silvia Di Pietro | 50 m freestyle | 24.89 | 17 | did not advance | | | |
| Erika Ferraioli | 50 m freestyle | 25.40 | 34 | did not advance | | | |
| Erika Ferraioli | 100 m freestyle | 55.20 | 26 | did not advance | | | |
| Sara Franceschi | 200 m individual medley | 2:15.61 | 28 | did not advance | | | |
| Sara Franceschi | 400 m individual medley | 4:48.48 | 30 | —N/a | | did not advance | |
| Alice Mizzau | 200 m freestyle | 1:59.16 | 24 | did not advance | | | |
| Alice Mizzau | 400 m freestyle | 4:14.20 | 22 | —N/a | | did not advance | |
| Margherita Panziera | 200 m backstroke | 2:10.92 | 17 | did not advance | | | |
| Federica Pellegrini | 100 m freestyle | DNS | | did not advance | | | |
| Federica Pellegrini | 200 m freestyle | 1:56.37 | 5 Q | 1:55.42 | 3 Q | 1:55.18 | 4 |
| Stefania Pirozzi | 200 m butterfly | 2:09.40 | 17 | did not advance | | | |
| Alessia Polieri | 200 m butterfly | 2:08.95 | 15 Q | 2:09.35 | 14 | did not advance | |
| Luisa Trombetti | 200 m individual medley | 2:14.66 | 22 | did not advance | | | |
| Luisa Trombetti | 400 m individual medley | 4:45.52 | 26 | —N/a | | did not advance | |
| Silvia Di Pietro; Erika Ferraioli; Laura Letrari; Alice Mizzau; Federica Pellegrini; Aglaia Pezzato | 4 × 100 m freestyle relay | 3:35.90 | 4 Q | —N/a | | 3:36.78 | 6 |
| Diletta Carli; Martina De Memme; Chiara Masini Luccetti; Alice Mizzau; Federica Pellegrini | 4 × 200 m freestyle relay | 7:57.74 | 13 | —N/a | | did not advance | |
| Ilaria Bianchi; Arianna Castiglioni; Federica Pellegrini; Carlotta Zofkova | 4 × 100 m medley relay | 3:59.09 | 7 Q | —N/a | | 3:59.50 | 8 |

== Synchronized swimming ==
Italy has fielded a squad of nine synchronized swimmers to compete in both the women's team and duet routine by virtue of their third-place finish at the FINA Olympic test event in Rio de Janeiro.

| Athlete | Event | Technical routine | | Free routine (preliminary) | | | Free routine (final) | | |
| Athlete | Event | Points | Rank | Points | Total (technical + free) | Rank | Points | Total (technical + free) | Rank |
|---|---|---|---|---|---|---|---|---|---|
| Linda Cerruti; Costanza Ferro | Duet | 90.4412 | 6 | 91.1333 | 181.5745 | 6 Q | 92.3667 | 182.8079 | 6 |
| Elisa Bozzo; Beatrice Callegari; Camilla Cattaneo; Linda Cerruti; Francesca Deidda; Costanza Ferro; Manila Flamini; Mariangela Perrupato; Sara Sgarzi | Team | 91.1142 | 5 | —N/a | | | 92.2667 | 183.3809 | 5 |

== Tennis ==
Italy has entered seven tennis players (four men and three women) into the Olympic tournament. Two-time Olympian Andreas Seppi (world no. 40), along with his colleagues Fabio Fognini (world no. 34) and rookie Paolo Lorenzi (world no. 57), qualified directly for the men's singles as three of the top 56 eligible players in the ATP World Rankings, while Roberta Vinci (world no. 7), Sara Errani (world no. 22), and Karin Knapp (world no. 93) did so for the women's singles based on their WTA World Rankings as of June 6, 2016.

On June 30, 2016, the International Tennis Federation awarded one of the Olympic women's singles places to three-time Olympian Francesca Schiavone, as Italy's top-ranked player outside of direct qualifying position, but she decided to reject the invitation. On July 30, 2016, Thomas Fabbiano (world no. 112) received a spare ITF Olympic place following the withdrawal of several tennis players from the Games.

Men

| Athlete | Event | Round of 64 | Round of 32 | Round of 16 | Quarterfinals | Semifinals | Final / BM | |
| Athlete | Event | Opposition Score | Opposition Score | Opposition Score | Opposition Score | Opposition Score | Opposition Score | Rank |
|---|---|---|---|---|---|---|---|---|
| Thomas Fabbiano | Singles | Dutra Silva (BRA); L 6–7^{(4–7)}, 1–6 | did not advance | | | | | |
| Fabio Fognini | Singles | Estrella Burgos (DOM); W 2–6, 7–6^{(7–4)}, 6–0 | Paire (FRA); W 6–4, 4–6, 7–6^{(7–5)} | Murray (GBR); L 1–6, 6–2, 3–6 | did not advance | | | |
| Paolo Lorenzi | Singles | Lu Y-h (TPE); W 3–6, 6–3, 6–4 | Bautista Agut (ESP); L 6–7^{(2–7)}, 2–6 | did not advance | | | | |
| Andreas Seppi | Singles | Marchenko (UKR); W 6–3, 3–6, 7–6^{(8–6)} | Nadal (ESP); L 3–6, 3–6 | did not advance | | | | |
| Fabio Fognini; Andreas Seppi | Doubles | —N/a | Marchenko / Molchanov (UKR); W 6–4, 6–3 | Bellucci / Sá (BRA); W 5–7, 7–5, 6–3 | Nestor / Pospisil (CAN); L 3–6, 1–6 | did not advance | | |

Women

| Athlete | Event | Round of 64 | Round of 32 | Round of 16 | Quarterfinals | Semifinals | Final / BM | |
| Athlete | Event | Opposition Score | Opposition Score | Opposition Score | Opposition Score | Opposition Score | Opposition Score | Rank |
|---|---|---|---|---|---|---|---|---|
| Sara Errani | Singles | Bertens (NED); W 4–6, 6–4, 6–3 | Strýcová (CZE); W 6–2, 6–2 | Kasatkina (RUS); L 5–7, 2–6 | did not advance | | | |
| Karin Knapp | Singles | Šafářová (CZE); L 6–4, 1–6, 1–6 | did not advance | | | | | |
| Roberta Vinci | Singles | Schmiedlová (SVK); L 5–7, 4–6 | did not advance | | | | | |
| Sara Errani; Roberta Vinci | Doubles | —N/a | Kerber / Petkovic (GER); W 6–2, 6–2 | Xu Yf / Zheng Ss (CHN); W 6–2, 6–3 | Šafářová / Strýcová (CZE); L 6–4, 4–6, 4–6 | did not advance | | |

Mixed

| Athlete | Event | Round of 16 | Quarterfinals | Semifinals | Final / BM | |
| Athlete | Event | Opposition Score | Opposition Score | Opposition Score | Opposition Score | Rank |
|---|---|---|---|---|---|---|
| Roberta Vinci; Fabio Fognini | Doubles | Mladenovic / Herbert (FRA); W 6–4, 3–6, [10–8] | V Williams / Ram (USA); L 3–6, 5–7 | did not advance | | |

== Triathlon ==
Italy has qualified a total of four triathletes for the following events at the Olympics. London 2012 Olympians Alessandro Fabian, Davide Uccellari, and Annamaria Mazzetti, along with Charlotte Bonin, were ranked among the top 43 eligible triathletes each in the men's and women's event, respectively, based on the ITU Olympic Qualification List as of May 15, 2016.

| Athlete | Event | Swim (1.5 km) | Trans 1 | Bike (40 km) | Trans 2 | Run (10 km) | Total Time | Rank |
|---|---|---|---|---|---|---|---|---|
| Alessandro Fabian | Men's | 17:22 | 0:49 | 55:07 | 0:40 | 33:37 | 1:47:35 | 14 |
| Davide Uccellari | Men's | 17:32 | 0:51 | 56:57 | 0:37 | 35:09 | 1:51:06 | 34 |
| Charlotte Bonin | Women's | 19:07 | 0:55 | 1:01:29 | 0:43 | 38:34 | 2:00:48 | 17 |
| Annamaria Mazzetti | Women's | 19:42 | 0:52 | 1:04:08 | 0:37 | 36:34 | 2:01:53 | 29 |

== Volleyball ==
=== Beach ===
Three Italian beach volleyball teams (one men's pair and two women's pairs) qualified directly for the Olympics by virtue of their nation's top 15 placement in the FIVB Olympic Rankings as of June 13, 2016. Among the beach volleyball players featured London 2012 Olympians Marta Menegatti and duo Daniele Lupo and Paolo Nicolai.

On 3 August 2016, Viktoria Orsi Toth was excluded from the women's tournament due to positive doping test for clostebol before the competitions.

| Athlete | Event | Preliminary round | Standing | Round of 16 | Quarterfinals | Semifinals | Final / BM | |
| Athlete | Event | Opposition Score | Standing | Opposition Score | Opposition Score | Opposition Score | Opposition Score | Rank |
|---|---|---|---|---|---|---|---|---|
| Adrian Carambula; Alex Ranghieri | Men's | Pool A Doppler – Horst (AUT); W 2 – 0 (21–14, 21–13); Binstock – Schachter (CAN); W 2 – 1 (21–18, 14–21, 15–11); Cerutti – Schmidt (BRA); L 0 – 2 (19–21, 16–21) | 1 Q | Lupo – Nicolai (ITA); L 0 – 2 (12–21, 21–23) | did not advance | | | |
| Daniele Lupo; Paolo Nicolai | Men's | Pool C Ontiveros – Virgen (MEX); L 1 – 2 (21–14, 14–21, 11–15); Naceur – Salah (TUN); W 2 – 0 (21–17, 21–13); Dalhausser – Lucena (USA); L 1 – 2 (13–21, 21–17, 22–24); Lucky Losers; Kantor – Łosiak (POL); W 2 – 1 (21–12, 15–21, 15–13) | 3 q | Carambula – Ranghieri (ITA); W 2 – 0 (21–12, 23–21) | Barsouk – Liamin (RUS); W 2 – 1 (21–18, 20–22, 15–11) | Krasilnikov – Semenov (RUS); W 2 – 1 (15–21, 21–16, 15–13) | Alison – Bruno Schmidt (BRA); L (19–21, 17–21) | 2nd place, silver medalist(s) |
| Laura Giombini; Marta Menegatti | Women's | Pool D Broder – Valjas (CAN); L 1 – 2 (21–15, 18–21, 9–15); El-Ghobashy – Meawad (EGY); W 2 – 0 (21–10, 21–13); Ludwig – Walkenhorst (GER); L (18–21, 21–18, 9–15) | 3 Q | Ross – Walsh Jennings (USA); L 0 – 2 (10–21, 16–21) | did not advance | | | |

=== Indoor ===
==== Men's tournament ====
Italy men's volleyball team qualified for the Olympics by attaining a top two finish at the 2015 FIVB World Cup in Japan.

Team roster

The following is the Italy roster in the men's volleyball tournament of the 2016 Summer Olympics.

Head coach: Gianlorenzo Blengini

| No. | Name | Date of birth | Height | Weight | Spike | Block | 2015–16 club |
|---|---|---|---|---|---|---|---|
| 3 | Daniele Sottile | 17 August 1979 | 1.86 m (6 ft 1 in) | 73 kg (161 lb) | 332 cm (131 in) | 310 cm (120 in) | (Italy) Ninfa Latina |
| 4 | Luca Vettori | 26 April 1991 | 2.00 m (6 ft 7 in) | 95 kg (209 lb) | 345 cm (136 in) | 323 cm (127 in) | (Italy) DHL Modena |
| 5 | Osmany Juantorena | 12 August 1985 | 2.00 m (6 ft 7 in) | 85 kg (187 lb) | 370 cm (150 in) | 340 cm (130 in) | (Italy) Cucine Lube Civitanova |
| 6 | Simone Giannelli | 9 August 1996 | 1.98 m (6 ft 6 in) | 92 kg (203 lb) | 342 cm (135 in) | 265 cm (104 in) | (Italy) Diatec Trentino |
| 7 | Salvatore Rossini | 13 July 1986 | 1.85 m (6 ft 1 in) | 82 kg (181 lb) | 312 cm (123 in) | 301 cm (119 in) | (Italy) DHL Modena |
| 9 | Ivan Zaytsev | 2 October 1988 | 2.02 m (6 ft 8 in) | 92 kg (203 lb) | 355 cm (140 in) | 348 cm (137 in) | (Russia) Dynamo Moscow |
| 10 | Filippo Lanza | 3 March 1991 | 1.98 m (6 ft 6 in) | 98 kg (216 lb) | 350 cm (140 in) | 330 cm (130 in) | (Italy) Diatec Trentino |
| 11 | Simone Buti | 19 September 1983 | 2.06 m (6 ft 9 in) | 100 kg (220 lb) | 346 cm (136 in) | 328 cm (129 in) | (Italy) Sir Safety Conad Perugia |
| 13 | Massimo Colaci (L) | 21 February 1985 | 1.80 m (5 ft 11 in) | 75 kg (165 lb) | 324 cm (128 in) | 308 cm (121 in) | (Italy) Diatec Trentino |
| 14 | Matteo Piano | 24 October 1990 | 2.08 m (6 ft 10 in) | 102 kg (225 lb) | 352 cm (139 in) | 325 cm (128 in) | (Italy) DHL Modena |
| 15 | Emanuele Birarelli (c) | 8 February 1981 | 2.02 m (6 ft 8 in) | 95 kg (209 lb) | 340 cm (130 in) | 316 cm (124 in) | (Italy) Sir Safety Conad Perugia |
| 16 | Oleg Antonov | 28 July 1988 | 1.98 m (6 ft 6 in) | 88 kg (194 lb) | 340 cm (130 in) | 310 cm (120 in) | (Italy) Diatec Trentino |

Group play

| Pos | Team | Pld | W | L | Pts | SW | SL | SR | SPW | SPL | SPR | Qualification |
|---|---|---|---|---|---|---|---|---|---|---|---|---|
| 1 | Italy | 5 | 4 | 1 | 12 | 13 | 5 | 2.600 | 432 | 375 | 1.152 | Quarterfinals |
| 2 | Canada | 5 | 3 | 2 | 9 | 10 | 7 | 1.429 | 378 | 378 | 1.000 | Quarterfinals |
| 3 | United States | 5 | 3 | 2 | 9 | 10 | 8 | 1.250 | 419 | 405 | 1.035 | Quarterfinals |
| 4 | Brazil (H) | 5 | 3 | 2 | 9 | 11 | 9 | 1.222 | 467 | 442 | 1.057 | Quarterfinals |
| 5 | France | 5 | 2 | 3 | 6 | 8 | 9 | 0.889 | 386 | 367 | 1.052 | |
| 6 | Mexico | 5 | 0 | 5 | 0 | 1 | 15 | 0.067 | 283 | 398 | 0.711 | |

Source: FIVB
Rules for classification: Tiebreakers
(H) Host

| 7 August 2016; 09:30 | Italy | 3–0 | France | Ginásio do Maracanãzinho, Rio de Janeiro; Attendance: 4,456; Referees: Hernán Casamiquela (ARG), Denny Cespedes (DOM) |
| 7 August 2016; 09:30 | (25–20, 25–20, 25–15); Results Statistics | | | Ginásio do Maracanãzinho, Rio de Janeiro; Attendance: 4,456; Referees: Hernán Casamiquela (ARG), Denny Cespedes (DOM) |

| 9 August 2016; 15:00 | Italy | 3–1 | United States | Ginásio do Maracanãzinho, Rio de Janeiro; Attendance: 6,494; Referees: Vladimir Simonović (SRB), Andrey Zenovich (RUS) |
| 9 August 2016; 15:00 | (28–26, 20–25, 25–23, 25–23); Results Statistics | | | Ginásio do Maracanãzinho, Rio de Janeiro; Attendance: 6,494; Referees: Vladimir Simonović (SRB), Andrey Zenovich (RUS) |

| 11 August 2016; 20:30 | Italy | 3–0 | Mexico | Ginásio do Maracanãzinho, Rio de Janeiro; Attendance: 5,472; Referees: Arturo Di Giacomo (BEL), Piotr Dudek (POL) |
| 11 August 2016; 20:30 | (25–17, 25–13, 25–17); Results Statistics | | | Ginásio do Maracanãzinho, Rio de Janeiro; Attendance: 5,472; Referees: Arturo Di Giacomo (BEL), Piotr Dudek (POL) |

| 13 August 2016; 22:35 | Brazil | 1–3 | Italy | Ginásio do Maracanãzinho, Rio de Janeiro; Attendance: 8,892; Referees: Piotr Dudek (POL), Nasr Shaaban (EGY) |
| 13 August 2016; 22:35 | (25–23, 23–25, 22–25, 15–25); Results Statistics | | | Ginásio do Maracanãzinho, Rio de Janeiro; Attendance: 8,892; Referees: Piotr Dudek (POL), Nasr Shaaban (EGY) |

| 15 August 2016; 20:30 | Italy | 1–3 | Canada | Ginásio do Maracanãzinho, Rio de Janeiro; Attendance: 7,109; Referees: Andrey Zenovich (RUS), Hernán Casamiquela (ARG) |
| 15 August 2016; 20:30 | (23–25, 17–25, 25–16, 21–25); Results Statistics | | | Ginásio do Maracanãzinho, Rio de Janeiro; Attendance: 7,109; Referees: Andrey Zenovich (RUS), Hernán Casamiquela (ARG) |

Quarterfinal

| 17 August 2016; 18:00 | Italy | 3–0 | Iran | Ginásio do Maracanãzinho, Rio de Janeiro; Attendance: 7,213; Referees: Denny Cespedes (DOM), Juraj Mokrý (SVK) |
| 17 August 2016; 18:00 | (31–29, 25–19, 25–17); Results Statistics | | | Ginásio do Maracanãzinho, Rio de Janeiro; Attendance: 7,213; Referees: Denny Cespedes (DOM), Juraj Mokrý (SVK) |

Semifinal

| 19 August 2016; 13:00 | Italy | 3–2 | United States | Ginásio do Maracanãzinho, Rio de Janeiro; Attendance: 8,153; Referees: Arturo Di Giacomo (BEL), Hernán Casamiquela (ARG) |
| 19 August 2016; 13:00 | (30–28, 26–28, 9–25, 25–22, 15–9); Results Statistics | | | Ginásio do Maracanãzinho, Rio de Janeiro; Attendance: 8,153; Referees: Arturo Di Giacomo (BEL), Hernán Casamiquela (ARG) |

Gold medal match

| 21 August 2016; 13:15 | Italy | 0–3 | Brazil | Ginásio do Maracanãzinho, Rio de Janeiro; Attendance: 9,824; Referees: Andrey Zenovich (RUS), Denny Cespedes (DOM) |
| 21 August 2016; 13:15 | (22–25, 26–28, 24–26); Results Statistics | | | Ginásio do Maracanãzinho, Rio de Janeiro; Attendance: 9,824; Referees: Andrey Zenovich (RUS), Denny Cespedes (DOM) |

==== Women's tournament ====
Italy women's volleyball team qualified for the Olympics by virtue of a top three national finish at the first meet of the World Olympic Qualifying Tournament in Tokyo, Japan.

Team roster

The following is the Italian roster in the women's volleyball tournament of the 2016 Summer Olympics.

Head coach: Marco Bonitta

| No. | Name | Date of birth | Height | Weight | Spike | Block | 2015–16 club |
|---|---|---|---|---|---|---|---|
| 1 | Serena Ortolani | 7 January 1987 | 1.86 m (6 ft 1 in) | 63 kg (139 lb) | 315 cm (124 in) | 310 cm (120 in) | (Italy) Imoco Volley |
| 4 | Alessia Orro | 18 July 1998 | 1.78 m (5 ft 10 in) | 74 kg (163 lb) | 308 cm (121 in) | 302 cm (119 in) | (Italy) Club Italia |
| 6 | Monica De Gennaro (L) | 8 January 1987 | 1.74 m (5 ft 9 in) | 67 kg (148 lb) | 270 cm (110 in) | 265 cm (104 in) | (Italy) Imoco Volley |
| 7 | Martina Guiggi | 1 May 1984 | 1.86 m (6 ft 1 in) | 80 kg (180 lb) | 317 cm (125 in) | 312 cm (123 in) | (Italy) AGIL Novara |
| 8 | Alessia Gennari | 3 November 1991 | 1.83 m (6 ft 0 in) | 68 kg (150 lb) | 305 cm (120 in) | 238 cm (94 in) | (Italy) Foppapedretti Bergamo |
| 9 | Nadia Centoni | 19 June 1981 | 1.84 m (6 ft 0 in) | 63 kg (139 lb) | 315 cm (124 in) | 311 cm (122 in) | (Turkey) Galatasaray S.K. |
| 11 | Cristina Chirichella | 10 February 1994 | 1.95 m (6 ft 5 in) | 73 kg (161 lb) | 320 cm (130 in) | 315 cm (124 in) | (Italy) AGIL Novara |
| 14 | Eleonora Lo Bianco | 22 December 1979 | 1.71 m (5 ft 7 in) | 67 kg (148 lb) | 300 cm (120 in) | 295 cm (116 in) | (Turkey) Galatasaray S.K. |
| 15 | Antonella Del Core (c) | 5 November 1980 | 1.83 m (6 ft 0 in) | 75 kg (165 lb) | 310 cm (120 in) | 305 cm (120 in) | (Russia) Dynamo Kazan |
| 16 | Miriam Sylla | 8 January 1995 | 1.87 m (6 ft 2 in) | 80 kg (180 lb) | 320 cm (130 in) | 315 cm (124 in) | (Italy) Foppapedretti Bergamo |
| 18 | Paola Egonu | 18 December 1998 | 1.93 m (6 ft 4 in) | 70 kg (150 lb) | 336 cm (132 in) | 330 cm (130 in) | (Italy) Club Italia |
| 20 | Anna Danesi | 20 April 1996 | 1.98 m (6 ft 6 in) | 75 kg (165 lb) | 312 cm (123 in) | 308 cm (121 in) | (Italy) Club Italia |

Group play

| Pos | Team | Pld | W | L | Pts | SW | SL | SR | SPW | SPL | SPR | Qualification |
|---|---|---|---|---|---|---|---|---|---|---|---|---|
| 1 | United States | 5 | 5 | 0 | 14 | 15 | 5 | 3.000 | 470 | 400 | 1.175 | Quarter-finals |
| 2 | Netherlands | 5 | 4 | 1 | 11 | 14 | 7 | 2.000 | 455 | 425 | 1.071 | Quarter-finals |
| 3 | Serbia | 5 | 3 | 2 | 10 | 12 | 6 | 2.000 | 410 | 394 | 1.041 | Quarter-finals |
| 4 | China | 5 | 2 | 3 | 7 | 9 | 9 | 1.000 | 398 | 389 | 1.023 | Quarter-finals |
| 5 | Italy | 5 | 1 | 4 | 3 | 4 | 12 | 0.333 | 351 | 374 | 0.939 | |
| 6 | Puerto Rico | 5 | 0 | 5 | 0 | 0 | 15 | 0.000 | 277 | 379 | 0.731 | |

Source: FIVB
Rules for classification: Tiebreakers

| 6 August 2016; 22:35 | Serbia | 3–0 | Italy | Ginásio do Maracanãzinho, Rio de Janeiro; Attendance: 4,373; Referees: Piotr Dudek (POL), Arturo Di Giacomo (BEL) |
| 6 August 2016; 22:35 | (27–25, 25–20, 25–23); Result Statistics | | | Ginásio do Maracanãzinho, Rio de Janeiro; Attendance: 4,373; Referees: Piotr Dudek (POL), Arturo Di Giacomo (BEL) |

| 8 August 2016; 09:30 | China | 3–0 | Italy | Ginásio do Maracanãzinho, Rio de Janeiro; Attendance: 4,804; Referees: Patricia Rolf (USA), Paulo Turci (BRA) |
| 8 August 2016; 09:30 | (25–21, 25–21, 25–16); Result Statistics | | | Ginásio do Maracanãzinho, Rio de Janeiro; Attendance: 4,804; Referees: Patricia Rolf (USA), Paulo Turci (BRA) |

| 10 August 2016; 11:35 | Italy | 0–3 | Netherlands | Ginásio do Maracanãzinho, Rio de Janeiro; Attendance: 5,539; Referees: Juraj Mokrý (SVK), Nasr Shaaban (EGY) |
| 10 August 2016; 11:35 | (21–25, 20–25, 20–25); Result Statistics | | | Ginásio do Maracanãzinho, Rio de Janeiro; Attendance: 5,539; Referees: Juraj Mokrý (SVK), Nasr Shaaban (EGY) |

| 12 August 2016; 15:00 | United States | 3–1 | Italy | Ginásio do Maracanãzinho, Rio de Janeiro; Attendance: 7,243; Referees: Rogerio Espicalsky (BRA), Denny Cespedes (DOM) |
| 12 August 2016; 15:00 | (25–22, 25–22, 23–25, 25–20); Result Statistics | | | Ginásio do Maracanãzinho, Rio de Janeiro; Attendance: 7,243; Referees: Rogerio Espicalsky (BRA), Denny Cespedes (DOM) |

| 14 August 2016; 15:00 | Italy | 3–0 | Puerto Rico | Ginásio do Maracanãzinho, Rio de Janeiro; Attendance: 7,225; Referees: Kang Joo-hee (KOR), Patricia Rolf (USA) |
| 14 August 2016; 15:00 | (25–14, 25–13, 25–22); Result Statistics | | | Ginásio do Maracanãzinho, Rio de Janeiro; Attendance: 7,225; Referees: Kang Joo-hee (KOR), Patricia Rolf (USA) |

== Water polo ==
Summary

Key:
- FT – After full time.
- P – Match decided by penalty-shootout.

| Team | Event | Group Stage | | | | | | Quarterfinal | Semifinal | Final / BM | |
| Team | Event | Opposition Score | Opposition Score | Opposition Score | Opposition Score | Opposition Score | Rank | Opposition Score | Opposition Score | Opposition Score | Rank |
|---|---|---|---|---|---|---|---|---|---|---|---|
| Italy men's | Men's tournament | Spain; W 9–8 | France; W 11–8 | Montenegro; W 6–5 | Croatia; L 7–10 | United States; L 7–10 | 3 | Greece; W 9–5 | Serbia; L 8–10 | Montenegro; W 12–10 | 3rd place, bronze medalist(s) |
| Italy women's | Women's tournament | Brazil; W 9–3 | Australia; W 8–7 | Russia; W 10–5 | —N/a | | 1 | China; W 12–7 | Russia; W 12–9 | United States; L 5–12 | 2nd place, silver medalist(s) |

=== Men's tournament ===
Italy men's water polo team qualified for the Olympics by virtue of a top four finish at the Olympic Qualification Tournament in Trieste.

Team roster

The following is the Italian roster in the men's water polo tournament of the 2016 Summer Olympics.

Head coach: Alessandro Campagna

| № | Name | Pos. | Height | Weight | Date of birth | 2016 club |
|---|---|---|---|---|---|---|
| 1 | Stefano Tempesti (c) | GK | 2.05 m (6 ft 9 in) | 100 kg (220 lb) | 9 June 1979 | (Italy) Pro Recco |
| 2 | Francesco Di Fulvio | D | 1.90 m (6 ft 3 in) | 88 kg (194 lb) | 15 August 1993 | (Italy) Pro Recco |
| 3 | Niccolò Gitto | CB | 1.90 m (6 ft 3 in) | 90 kg (198 lb) | 12 October 1986 | (Italy) Pro Recco |
| 4 | Pietro Figlioli | D | 1.91 m (6 ft 3 in) | 98 kg (216 lb) | 29 May 1984 | (Italy) Pro Recco |
| 5 | Alessandro Velotto | CB | 1.86 m (6 ft 1 in) | 85 kg (187 lb) | 21 February 1995 | (Italy) Canottieri Napoli |
| 6 | Michaël Bodegas | CF | 1.92 m (6 ft 4 in) | 102 kg (225 lb) | 3 May 1987 | (Italy) Pro Recco |
| 7 | Andrea Fondelli | D | 1.90 m (6 ft 3 in) | 96 kg (212 lb) | 27 February 1994 | (Italy) Pro Recco |
| 8 | Valentino Gallo | D | 1.92 m (6 ft 4 in) | 95 kg (209 lb) | 17 July 1985 | (Italy) Posillipo |
| 9 | Christian Presciutti | D | 1.84 m (6 ft 0 in) | 87 kg (192 lb) | 27 November 1982 | (Italy) Pro Recco |
| 10 | Nicholas Presciutti | CB | 1.89 m (6 ft 2 in) | 93 kg (205 lb) | 14 December 1993 | (Italy) Pro Recco |
| 11 | Matteo Aicardi | CF | 1.92 m (6 ft 4 in) | 102 kg (225 lb) | 19 April 1986 | (Italy) Pro Recco |
| 12 | Alessandro Nora | D | 1.91 m (6 ft 3 in) | 85 kg (187 lb) | 24 May 1987 | (Italy) AN Brescia |
| 13 | Marco Del Lungo | GK | 1.90 m (6 ft 3 in) | 97 kg (214 lb) | 1 March 1990 | (Italy) AN Brescia |

Group play

| Pos | Team | Pld | W | D | L | GF | GA | GD | Pts | Qualification |
|---|---|---|---|---|---|---|---|---|---|---|
| 1 | Spain | 5 | 3 | 1 | 1 | 46 | 35 | +11 | 7 | Quarter-finals |
| 2 | Croatia | 5 | 3 | 0 | 2 | 37 | 37 | 0 | 6 | Quarter-finals |
| 3 | Italy | 5 | 3 | 0 | 2 | 40 | 41 | −1 | 6 | Quarter-finals |
| 4 | Montenegro | 5 | 2 | 1 | 2 | 36 | 32 | +4 | 5 | Quarter-finals |
| 5 | United States | 5 | 2 | 0 | 3 | 35 | 35 | 0 | 4 | |
| 6 | France | 5 | 1 | 0 | 4 | 28 | 42 | −14 | 2 | |

Source: Rio2016
Rules for classification: 1) Points; 2) Head-to-head points; 3) Head-to-head goal difference; 4) Head-to-head goals scored; 5) Goal difference.

| 6 August 2016; 11:40 | Report | Spain | 8–9 | Italy | Maria Lenk Aquatic Center, Rio de Janeiro; Referees: Vojin Putniković (SRB), Georgios Stavridis (GRE) |
| 6 August 2016; 11:40 | Report | Score by quarters: 3–2, 2–1, 1–2, 2–4 | | | Maria Lenk Aquatic Center, Rio de Janeiro; Referees: Vojin Putniković (SRB), Georgios Stavridis (GRE) |
| 6 August 2016; 11:40 | Report | Molina 4 | Goals | Figlioli, Presciutti 3 | Maria Lenk Aquatic Center, Rio de Janeiro; Referees: Vojin Putniković (SRB), Georgios Stavridis (GRE) |

| 8 August 2016; 10:20 | Report | Italy | 11–8 | France | Maria Lenk Aquatic Center, Rio de Janeiro; Referees: Radosław Koryzna (POL), Sergey Naumov (RUS) |
| 8 August 2016; 10:20 | Report | Score by quarters: 4–3, 4–1, 1–2, 2–2 | | | Maria Lenk Aquatic Center, Rio de Janeiro; Referees: Radosław Koryzna (POL), Sergey Naumov (RUS) |
| 8 August 2016; 10:20 | Report | Aicardi 4 | Goals | three players 2 | Maria Lenk Aquatic Center, Rio de Janeiro; Referees: Radosław Koryzna (POL), Sergey Naumov (RUS) |

| 10 August 2016; 13:00 | Report | Montenegro | 5–6 | Italy | Maria Lenk Aquatic Center, Rio de Janeiro; Referees: Péter Molnár (HUN), Georgios Stavridis (GRE) |
| 10 August 2016; 13:00 | Report | Score by quarters: 1–2, 1–1, 0–1, 3–2 | | | Maria Lenk Aquatic Center, Rio de Janeiro; Referees: Péter Molnár (HUN), Georgios Stavridis (GRE) |
| 10 August 2016; 13:00 | Report | Brguljan 2 | Goals | Di Fulvio 3 | Maria Lenk Aquatic Center, Rio de Janeiro; Referees: Péter Molnár (HUN), Georgios Stavridis (GRE) |

| 12 August 2016; 10:20 | Report | Croatia | 10–7 | Italy | Maria Lenk Aquatic Center, Rio de Janeiro; Referees: Mark Koganov (AZE), Daniel Flahive (AUS) |
| 12 August 2016; 10:20 | Report | Score by quarters: 1–1, 4–3, 3–2, 2–1 | | | Maria Lenk Aquatic Center, Rio de Janeiro; Referees: Mark Koganov (AZE), Daniel Flahive (AUS) |
| 12 August 2016; 10:20 | Report | Sukno 5 | Goals | Gallo 2 | Maria Lenk Aquatic Center, Rio de Janeiro; Referees: Mark Koganov (AZE), Daniel Flahive (AUS) |

| 14 August 2016; 15:30 | Report | United States | 10–7 | Italy | Olympic Aquatics Stadium, Rio de Janeiro; Referees: Boris Margeta (SLO), Vojin Putniković (SRB) |
| 14 August 2016; 15:30 | Report | Score by quarters: 2–4, 3–2, 3–1, 2–0 | | | Olympic Aquatics Stadium, Rio de Janeiro; Referees: Boris Margeta (SLO), Vojin Putniković (SRB) |
| 14 August 2016; 15:30 | Report | four players 2 | Goals | Di Fulvio, Figlioli 2 | Olympic Aquatics Stadium, Rio de Janeiro; Referees: Boris Margeta (SLO), Vojin Putniković (SRB) |

Quarterfinal

| 16 August 2016; 16:30 | Report | Greece | 5–9 | Italy | Olympic Aquatics Stadium, Rio de Janeiro; Referees: Sergey Naumov (RUS), Boris Margeta (SLO) |
| 16 August 2016; 16:30 | Report | Score by quarters: 0–2, 2–2, 1–2, 2–3 | | | Olympic Aquatics Stadium, Rio de Janeiro; Referees: Sergey Naumov (RUS), Boris Margeta (SLO) |
| 16 August 2016; 16:30 | Report | Fountoulis, Mourikis 2 | Goals | Figlioli 3 | Olympic Aquatics Stadium, Rio de Janeiro; Referees: Sergey Naumov (RUS), Boris Margeta (SLO) |

Semifinal

| 18 August 2016; 16:30 | Report | Italy | 8–10 | Serbia | Olympic Aquatics Stadium, Rio de Janeiro; Referees: Georgios Stavridis (GRE), Daniel Flahive (AUS) |
| 18 August 2016; 16:30 | Report | Score by quarters: 0–3, 2–3, 0–1, 6–3 | | | Olympic Aquatics Stadium, Rio de Janeiro; Referees: Georgios Stavridis (GRE), Daniel Flahive (AUS) |
| 18 August 2016; 16:30 | Report | three players 2 | Goals | three players 2 | Olympic Aquatics Stadium, Rio de Janeiro; Referees: Georgios Stavridis (GRE), Daniel Flahive (AUS) |

Bronze medal match

| 20 August 2016; 13:00 | Report | Montenegro | 10–12 | Italy | Olympic Aquatics Stadium, Rio de Janeiro; Referees: Boris Margeta (SLO), Sergey Naumov (RUS) |
| 20 August 2016; 13:00 | Report | Score by quarters: 1–2, 3–3, 2–4, 4–3 | | | Olympic Aquatics Stadium, Rio de Janeiro; Referees: Boris Margeta (SLO), Sergey Naumov (RUS) |
| 20 August 2016; 13:00 | Report | Janović 3 | Goals | C. Presciutti 4 | Olympic Aquatics Stadium, Rio de Janeiro; Referees: Boris Margeta (SLO), Sergey Naumov (RUS) |

=== Women's tournament ===
Italy women's water polo team qualified for the Olympics by virtue of a top four finish at the Olympic Qualification Tournament in Gouda.

Team roster

The following is the Italian roster in the women's water polo tournament of the 2016 Summer Olympics.

Head coach: Fabio Conti

| № | Name | Pos. | Height | Weight | Date of birth | 2016 club |
|---|---|---|---|---|---|---|
| 1 | Giulia Gorlero | GK | 1.80 m (5 ft 11 in) | 73 kg (161 lb) | 26 September 1990 | (Italy) Despar Messina |
| 2 | Chiara Tabani | CB | 1.76 m (5 ft 9 in) | 72 kg (159 lb) | 27 August 1994 | (Italy) Mediostar Prato |
| 3 | Arianna Garibotti | D | 1.69 m (5 ft 7 in) | 64 kg (141 lb) | 9 December 1989 | (Italy) Despar Messina |
| 4 | Elisa Queirolo | CB | 1.68 m (5 ft 6 in) | 61 kg (134 lb) | 6 March 1991 | (Italy) Plebiscito Padova |
| 5 | Federica Radicchi | CB | 1.70 m (5 ft 7 in) | 70 kg (154 lb) | 21 December 1988 | (Italy) Despar Messina |
| 6 | Rosaria Aiello | CF | 1.72 m (5 ft 8 in) | 74 kg (163 lb) | 12 May 1989 | (Italy) Despar Messina |
| 7 | Tania Di Mario (c) | D | 1.68 m (5 ft 6 in) | 62 kg (137 lb) | 4 May 1979 | (Italy) L'Ekipe Orizzonte |
| 8 | Roberta Bianconi | CB | 1.76 m (5 ft 9 in) | 76 kg (168 lb) | 8 July 1989 | (Greece) Olympiacos |
| 9 | Giulia Emmolo | D | 1.71 m (5 ft 7 in) | 67 kg (148 lb) | 16 October 1991 | (Greece) Olympiacos |
| 10 | Francesca Pomeri | CF | 1.74 m (5 ft 9 in) | 76 kg (168 lb) | 18 February 1993 | (Italy) Città di Cosenza |
| 11 | Aleksandra Cotti | CF | 1.67 m (5 ft 6 in) | 65 kg (143 lb) | 13 December 1988 | (Italy) Rapallo Pallanuoto |
| 12 | Teresa Frassinetti | CF | 1.78 m (5 ft 10 in) | 75 kg (165 lb) | 24 December 1985 | (Italy) Rari Nantes Bogliasco |
| 13 | Laura Teani | GK | 1.75 m (5 ft 9 in) | 75 kg (165 lb) | 13 March 1991 | (Italy) Plebiscito Padova |

Group play

| Pos | Team | Pld | W | D | L | GF | GA | GD | Pts | Qualification |
|---|---|---|---|---|---|---|---|---|---|---|
| 1 | Italy | 3 | 3 | 0 | 0 | 27 | 15 | +12 | 6 | Quarter-finals |
| 2 | Australia | 3 | 2 | 0 | 1 | 31 | 15 | +16 | 4 | Quarter-finals |
| 3 | Russia | 3 | 1 | 0 | 2 | 23 | 31 | −8 | 2 | Quarter-finals |
| 4 | Brazil (H) | 3 | 0 | 0 | 3 | 13 | 33 | −20 | 0 | Quarter-finals |

Source: Rio2016
Rules for classification: 1) Points; 2) Head-to-head points; 3) Head-to-head goal difference; 4) Head-to-head goals scored; 5) Goal difference.
(H) Hosts

| 9 August 2016; 10:20 | Report | Italy | 9–3 | Brazil | Maria Lenk Aquatic Center, Rio de Janeiro; Referees: Diana Dutilh-Dumas (NED), Dion Willis (RSA) |
| 9 August 2016; 10:20 | Report | Score by quarters: 1–1, 2–0, 3–0, 3–2 | | | Maria Lenk Aquatic Center, Rio de Janeiro; Referees: Diana Dutilh-Dumas (NED), Dion Willis (RSA) |
| 9 August 2016; 10:20 | Report | Bianconi 3 | Goals | three players 1 | Maria Lenk Aquatic Center, Rio de Janeiro; Referees: Diana Dutilh-Dumas (NED), Dion Willis (RSA) |

| 11 August 2016; 10:20 | Report | Italy | 8–7 | Australia | Maria Lenk Aquatic Center, Rio de Janeiro; Referees: Péter Molnár (HUN), Boris Margeta (SLO) |
| 11 August 2016; 10:20 | Report | Score by quarters: 4–2, 0–1, 2–3, 2–1 | | | Maria Lenk Aquatic Center, Rio de Janeiro; Referees: Péter Molnár (HUN), Boris Margeta (SLO) |
| 11 August 2016; 10:20 | Report | Garibotti 3 | Goals | Southern, Webster 2 | Maria Lenk Aquatic Center, Rio de Janeiro; Referees: Péter Molnár (HUN), Boris Margeta (SLO) |

| 13 August 2016; 10:20 | Report | Russia | 5–10 | Italy | Maria Lenk Aquatic Center, Rio de Janeiro; Referees: Joseph Peila (USA), Adrian Alexandrescu (ROU) |
| 13 August 2016; 10:20 | Report | Score by quarters: 2–3, 1–2, 1–3, 1–2 | | | Maria Lenk Aquatic Center, Rio de Janeiro; Referees: Joseph Peila (USA), Adrian Alexandrescu (ROU) |
| 13 August 2016; 10:20 | Report | Grineva 2 | Goals | Bianconi 3 | Maria Lenk Aquatic Center, Rio de Janeiro; Referees: Joseph Peila (USA), Adrian Alexandrescu (ROU) |

Quarterfinal

| 15 August 2016; 19:40 | Report | Italy | 12–7 | China | Olympic Aquatics Stadium, Rio de Janeiro; Referees: Georgios Stavridis (GRE), Adrian Alexandrescu (ROU) |
| 15 August 2016; 19:40 | Report | Score by quarters: 1–1, 3–1, 4–2, 4–3 | | | Olympic Aquatics Stadium, Rio de Janeiro; Referees: Georgios Stavridis (GRE), Adrian Alexandrescu (ROU) |
| 15 August 2016; 19:40 | Report | Bianconi 3 | Goals | Zhang Cong 3 | Olympic Aquatics Stadium, Rio de Janeiro; Referees: Georgios Stavridis (GRE), Adrian Alexandrescu (ROU) |

Semifinal

| 17 August 2016; 12:20 | Report | Russia | 9–12 | Italy | Olympic Aquatics Stadium, Rio de Janeiro; Referees: Mark Koganov (AZE), Francesc Buch (ESP) |
| 17 August 2016; 12:20 | Report | Score by quarters: 2–2, 2–4, 0–2, 5–4 | | | Olympic Aquatics Stadium, Rio de Janeiro; Referees: Mark Koganov (AZE), Francesc Buch (ESP) |
| 17 August 2016; 12:20 | Report | Ivanova, Lisunova 2 | Goals | Garibotti 5 | Olympic Aquatics Stadium, Rio de Janeiro; Referees: Mark Koganov (AZE), Francesc Buch (ESP) |

Gold medal match

| 19 August 2016; 15:30 | Report | United States | 12–5 | Italy | Olympic Aquatics Stadium, Rio de Janeiro; Referees: Adrian Alexandrescu (ROU), Francesc Buch (ESP) |
| 19 August 2016; 15:30 | Report | Score by quarters: 4–1, 1–2, 4–1, 3–1 | | | Olympic Aquatics Stadium, Rio de Janeiro; Referees: Adrian Alexandrescu (ROU), Francesc Buch (ESP) |
| 19 August 2016; 15:30 | Report | Neushul 3 | Goals | Radicchi 2 | Olympic Aquatics Stadium, Rio de Janeiro; Referees: Adrian Alexandrescu (ROU), Francesc Buch (ESP) |

== Weightlifting ==
Italy has qualified one male and one female weightlifter for the Rio Olympics by virtue of a top seven national finish (for men) and top six (for women), respectively, at the 2016 European Championships. The team must allocate these places to individual athletes by June 20, 2016.

The Italian Olympic Committee selected London 2012 Olympian Mirco Scarantino and rookie Giorgia Bordignon to the weightlifting team for the Games.

| Athlete | Event | Snatch | | Clean & Jerk | | Total | Rank |
| Athlete | Event | Result | Rank | Result | Rank | Total | Rank |
|---|---|---|---|---|---|---|---|
| Mirco Scarantino | Men's −56 kg | 115 | 10 | 149 | 5 | 264 | 7 |
| Giorgia Bordignon | Women's −63 kg | 98 | 8 | 119 | 6 | 217 | 6 |

== Wrestling ==
Italy has qualified two wrestlers for each of the following weight classes into the Olympic competition. One of them finished among the top six to book an Olympic spot in the men's freestyle 65 kg at the 2015 World Championships, while the other claimed the remaining Olympic slot in the men's Greco-Roman 98 kg to round out the Italian roster at the final meet of the World Qualification Tournament in Istanbul.

Key:
- VT – Victory by fall.
- PP – Decision by points – the loser with technical points.
- PO – Decision by points – the loser without technical points.
- ST – Great superiority – the loser without technical points and a margin of victory of at least 8 (Greco-Roman) or 10 (freestyle) points.

Men's freestyle

| Athlete | Event | Qualification | Round of 16 | Quarterfinal | Semifinal | Repechage 1 | Repechage 2 | Final / BM | |
| Athlete | Event | Opposition Result | Opposition Result | Opposition Result | Opposition Result | Opposition Result | Opposition Result | Opposition Result | Rank |
|---|---|---|---|---|---|---|---|---|---|
| Frank Chamizo | −65 kg | Bye | Safaryan (ARM); W 3–1 ^{PP} | Iakobishvili (GEO); W 3–1 ^{PP} | Asgarov (AZE); L 1–3 ^{PP} | Bye | | Molinaro (USA); W 3–1 ^{PP} | 3rd place, bronze medalist(s) |

Men's Greco-Roman

| Athlete | Event | Qualification | Round of 16 | Quarterfinal | Semifinal | Repechage 1 | Repechage 2 | Final / BM | |
| Athlete | Event | Opposition Result | Opposition Result | Opposition Result | Opposition Result | Opposition Result | Opposition Result | Opposition Result | Rank |
|---|---|---|---|---|---|---|---|---|---|
| Daigoro Timoncini | −98 kg | Bye | Aleksanyan (ARM); L 1–3 ^{PP} | did not advance | | Bye | Alexuc-Ciurariu (ROU); L 0–3 ^{PO} | Did not advance | 12 |

== See also ==
- Italy at the 2016 Summer Paralympics
