= 2022 ICF Canoe Sprint World Championships – Men's K-1 500 metres =

Men's K-1 500 metres at the 2022 ICF Canoe Sprint World Championships
- Venue: Lake Banook
- Location: Dartmouth, Canada
- Dates: 3–7 August
- Competitors: 31 from 31 nations
- Winning time: 1:42.45

Medalists
gold medal	Josef Dostál	Czech Republic
silver medal	Jean Westhuyzen	Australia
bronze medal	Fernando Pimenta	Portugal

The men's K-1 500 metres competition at the 2022 ICF Canoe Sprint World Championships in Dartmouth took place on Lake Banook.

== Schedule ==
The schedule is as follows:

Date	Time	Round
Wednesday 3 August 2022	12:30	Heats
Friday 5 August 2022	10:51	Semifinals
Saturday 6 August 2022	11:52	Final A
Saturday 6 August 2022	14:42	Final C
Saturday 6 August 2022	14:48	Final B

== Results ==
=== Heats ===
The five fastest boats in each heat, plus the two fastest sixth-place boats advanced to the semifinals.

==== Heat 1 ====
Rank	Canoeist	Country	Time	Notes
1	Francis Mouget	France	1:45.40	QS
2	Jeremy Hakala	Finland	1:47.81	QS
3	Darius Zaharia	Romania	1:48.99	QS
4	Eddy Barranco	Puerto Rico	1:58.22	QS

==== Heat 2 ====
Rank	Canoeist	Country	Time	Notes
1	Jakob Thordsen	Germany	1:43.08	QS
2	Gergely Balogh	Hungary	1:43.66	QS
3	Saeid Fazloula	ICF	1:47.24	QS
4	Ilya Podpolnyy	Israel	1:47.60	QS
5	Saphan Swaleh	Pakistan	2:12.04	QS
	José Alcazar	Mexico	DNF	
	Mohamed Ismail	Egypt	DNS	

==== Heat 3 ====
Rank	Canoeist	Country	Time	Notes
1	Dennis Kernen	Sweden	1:43.57	QS
2	Marcus Walz	Spain	1:46.52	QS
3	Mauro Crenna	Italy	1:46.83	QS
4	Rok Šmit	Slovenia	1:47.84	QS
5	Ryuji Matsushiro	Japan	1:49.96	QS
6	Amado Cruz	Belize	1:52.56	

==== Heat 4 ====
Rank	Canoeist	Country	Time	Notes
1	Jean Westhuyzen	Australia	1:43.79	QS
2	Thorbjørn Rask	Denmark	1:44.71	QS
3	Cameron Low	Canada	1:46.79	QS
4	Augustus Cook	United States	1:47.08	QS
5	Brandon Ooi	Singapore	1:47.27	QS
6	Ashton Reiser	New Zealand	1:47.37	qS

==== Heat 5 ====
Rank	Canoeist	Country	Time	Notes
1	Josef Dostál	Czech Republic	1:42.18	QS
2	Fernando Pimenta	Portugal	1:43.30	QS
3	Wiktor Leszczyński	Poland	1:43.63	QS
4	Matías Otero	Uruguay	1:44.00	QS
5	Milan Dörner	Slovakia	1:46.10	QS
6	Albert Flier	Netherlands	1:47.68	qS
7	Lin Yung	Chinese Taipei	1:49.13	
8	Nicolas Robinson	Trinidad and Tobago	2:02.72	

=== Semifinals ===
Qualification in each semi was as follows:

The fastest three boats advanced to the A final.
The next three fastest boats advanced to the B final.
The remaining boats advanced to the C final.

==== Semifinal 1 ====
Rank	Canoeist	Country	Time	Notes
1	Marcus Walz	Spain	1:41.89	QA
2	Jakob Thordsen	Germany	1:42.68	QA
3	Josef Dostál	Czech Republic	1:44.00	QA
4	Cameron Low	Canada	1:45.47	QB
5	Jeremy Hakala	Finland	1:46.02	QB
6	Augustus Cook	United States	1:46.21	QB
7	Eddy Barranco	Puerto Rico	1:59.97	QC
8	Matías Otero	Uruguay	2:04.07	QC
9	Saphan Swaleh	Pakistan	2:11.75	QC

==== Semifinal 2 ====
Rank	Canoeist	Country	Time	Notes
1	Fernando Pimenta	Portugal	1:42.78	QA
2	Mauro Crenna	Italy	1:43.32	QA
3	Thorbjørn Rask	Denmark	1:43.35	QA
4	Francis Mouget	France	1:43.59	QB
5	Milan Dörner	Slovakia	1:45.36	QB
6	Ryuji Matsushiro	Japan	1:46.47	QB
7	Albert Flier	Netherlands	1:47.28	QC
8	Ilya Podpolnyy	Israel	1:48.50	QC

==== Semifinal 3 ====
Rank	Canoeist	Country	Time	Notes
1	Jean Westhuyzen	Australia	1:42.02	QA
2	Dennis Kernen	Sweden	1:42.75	QA
3	Wiktor Leszczyński	Poland	1:42.87	QA
4	Gergely Balogh	Hungary	1:43.35	QB
5	Rok Šmit	Slovenia	1:45.45	QB
6	Saeid Fazloula	ICF	1:46.20	QB
7	Brandon Ooi	Singapore	1:46.80	QC
8	Ashton Reiser	New Zealand	1:47.06	QC
9	Darius Zaharia	Romania	1:52.62	QC

=== Finals ===
==== Final C ====
Competitors in this final raced for positions 19 to 26.

Rank	Canoeist	Country	Time
1	Brandon Ooi	Singapore	1:54.75
2	Ilya Podpolnyy	Israel	1:54.84
3	Ashton Reiser	New Zealand	1:55.78
4	Darius Zaharia	Romania	1:56.02
5	Albert Flier	Netherlands	1:59.09
6	Eddy Barranco	Puerto Rico	2:06.31
7	Matías Otero	Uruguay	2:13.30
8	Saphan Swaleh	Pakistan	2:27.11

==== Final B ====
Competitors in this final raced for positions 10 to 18.

Rank	Canoeist	Country	Time
1	Francis Mouget	France	1:50.76
2	Milan Dörner	Slovakia	1:50.80
3	Gergely Balogh	Hungary	1:50.81
4	Jeremy Hakala	Finland	1:53.00
5	Saeid Fazloula	ICF	1:53.46
6	Augustus Cook	United States	1:54.09
7	Cameron Low	Canada	1:54.68
8	Rok Šmit	Slovenia	1:55.39
9	Ryuji Matsushiro	Japan	1:57.32

==== Final A ====
Competitors in this final raced for positions 1 to 9, with medals going to the top three.

Rank	Canoeist	Country	Time
1st place, gold medalist(s)	Josef Dostál	Czech Republic	1:42.45
2nd place, silver medalist(s)	Jean Westhuyzen	Australia	1:43.57
3rd place, bronze medalist(s)	Fernando Pimenta	Portugal	1:44.06
4	Jakob Thordsen	Germany	1:46.24
5	Wiktor Leszczyński	Poland	1:46.44
6	Dennis Kernen	Sweden	1:47.57
7	Mauro Crenna	Italy	1:48.94
8	Thorbjørn Rask	Denmark	1:52.49
9	Marcus Walz	Spain	2:07.89
