= Crenna =

Crenna may refer to:

- Mauro Crenna (born 1991), Italian canoeist
- Richard Crenna (1926-2003), American motion picture, television, and radio actor
- Crenna, Gallarate, a frazione of Gallarate, Province of Varese, Italy
