= Canoeing at the 2016 Summer Olympics – Men's K-2 200 metres =

Men's canoe sprint K-2 200 metres at the Games of the XXXI Olympiad
- Venue: Lagoa Stadium
- Date: 17–18 August 2016
- Competitors: 26 from 13 nations
- Teams: 13
- Winning time: 32.075

Medalists
| 1st place, gold medalist(s) | | Saúl Craviotto; Cristian Toro | Spain |
| 2nd place, silver medalist(s) | | Liam Heath; Jon Schofield | Great Britain |
| 3rd place, bronze medalist(s) | | Aurimas Lankas; Edvinas Ramanauskas | Lithuania |

The men's canoe sprint K-2 200 metres competition at the 2016 Olympic Games in Rio de Janeiro took place between 17 and 18 August at Lagoa Stadium.

It was the last appearance of the men's K-2 200 metres. The men's C-1 200 metres and men's K-2 200 metres were replaced with women's C-1 200 metres and women's C-2 500 metres as part of the Olympics' move towards gender equality.

== Format ==
The competition comprised heats, semifinals, and a final round. Heat winners advanced to the "A" final, with all other boats getting a second chance in the semifinals. The top three from each semifinal also advanced to the "A" final, and competed for medals. A placing "B" final was held for the other semifinalists.

== Schedule ==
All times are Brasilia Time (UTC-03:00)

| Date | Time | Round |
|---|---|---|
| Wednesday, 17 August 2016 | 08:51; 10:10 | Heats; Semifinals |
| Thursday, 18 August 2016 | 09:47 | Finals |

== Results ==
=== Heats ===
The best placed boat from each heat qualified for the finals, remainder went to the semifinals.

==== Heat 1 ====
| Rank | Canoer | Country | Time | Notes |
|---|---|---|---|---|
| 1 | Aurimas Lankas; Edvinas Ramanauskas | Lithuania | 31.755 | FA |
| 2 | Nebojša Grujić; Marko Novaković | Serbia | 31.776 | SF |
| 3 | Maxime Beaumont; Sébastien Jouve | France | 31.855 | SF |
| 4 | Ryan Cochrane; Hugues Fournel | Canada | 32.749 | SF |
| 5 | Edson Isaias Freitas da Silva; Gilvan Bitencourt Ribeiro | Brazil | 33.021 | SF |
| 6 | Daniel Bowker; Jordan Wood | Australia | 34.246 | SF |

==== Heat 2 ====
| Rank | Canoer | Country | Time | Notes |
|---|---|---|---|---|
| 1 | Saúl Craviotto; Cristian Toro | Spain | 31.161 | FA |
| 2 | Sandor Totka; Péter Molnár | Hungary | 31.438 | SF |
| 3 | Liam Heath; Jon Schofield | Great Britain | 31.534 | SF |
| 4 | Tom Liebscher; Ronald Rauhe | Germany | 31.572 | SF |
| 5 | Sergii Tokarnytskyi; Andrey Yerguchyov | Kazakhstan | 33.807 | SF |
| 6 | Choi Min-kyu; Cho Gwang-hee | South Korea | 33.825 | SF |
| 7 | Alberto Ricchetti; Mauro Crenna | Italy | 34.000 | SF |

=== Semifinals ===
First three boats in each semifinal qualify for the "A" final, remainder go to the "B" final.

==== Semifinal 1 ====
| Rank | Canoer | Country | Time | Notes |
|---|---|---|---|---|
| 1 | Sandor Totka; Peter Molnar | Hungary | 32.138 | FA |
| 2 | Maxime Beaumont; Sébastien Jouve | France | 32.526 | FA |
| 3 | Ryan Cochrane; Hugues Fournel | Canada | 33.494 | FA |
| 4 | Choi Min-kyu; Cho Gwang-hee | South Korea | 33.767 | FB |
| 5 | Sergii Tokarnytskyi; Andrey Yerguchyov | Kazakhstan | 35.151 | FB |

==== Semifinal 2 ====
| Rank | Canoer | Country | Time | Notes |
|---|---|---|---|---|
| 1 | Liam Heath; Jon Schofield | Great Britain | 31.899 | FA |
| 2 | Tom Liebscher; Ronald Rauhe | Germany | 32.061 | FA |
| 3 | Nebojša Grujić; Marko Novaković | Serbia | 32.513 | FA |
| 4 | Edson Isaias Freitas da Silva; Gilvan Bitencourt Ribeiro | Brazil | 33.359 | FB |
| 5 | Alberto Ricchetti; Mauro Crenna | Italy | 34.318 | FB |
| 6 | Daniel Bowker; Jordan Wood | Australia | 34.845 | FB |

=== Finals ===
==== Final B ====
| Rank | Canoer | Country | Time | Notes |
|---|---|---|---|---|
| 1 | Choi Min-kyu; Cho Gwang-hee | South Korea | 33.812 | |
| 2 | Edson Isaias Freitas da Silva; Gilvan Bitencourt Ribeiro | Brazil | 33.992 | |
| 3 | Daniel Bowker; Jordan Wood | Australia | 35.334 | |
| 4 | Sergii Tokarnytskyi; Andrey Yerguchyov | Kazakhstan | 35.427 | |
| 5 | Alberto Ricchetti; Mauro Crenna | Italy | 35.516 | |

==== Final A ====
| Rank | Canoer | Country | Time | Notes |
|---|---|---|---|---|
| 1st place, gold medalist(s) | Saúl Craviotto; Cristian Toro | Spain | 32.075 | |
| 2nd place, silver medalist(s) | Liam Heath; Jon Schofield | Great Britain | 32.368 | |
| 3rd place, bronze medalist(s) | Aurimas Lankas; Edvinas Ramanauskas | Lithuania | 32.382 | |
| 4 | Sandor Totka; Péter Molnár | Hungary | 32.412 | |
| 5 | Tom Liebscher; Ronald Rauhe | Germany | 32.488 | |
| 6 | Nebojša Grujić; Marko Novaković | Serbia | 32.656 | |
| 7 | Maxime Beaumont; Sébastien Jouve | France | 32.699 | |
| 8 | Ryan Cochrane; Hugues Fournel | Canada | 33.767 | |
