= Daniel Bowker =

Australian canoeist (born 1987)

Personal information
- Born: 21 September 1987 (age 38) Perth, Western Australia, Australia

Sport
- Sport: Canoe sprint

Daniel Bowker (born 21 September 1987) is an Australian canoeist. He competed in the men's K-2 200 metres event at the 2016 Summer Olympics.
