= Alberto Ricchetti =

Italian canoeist (born 1985)

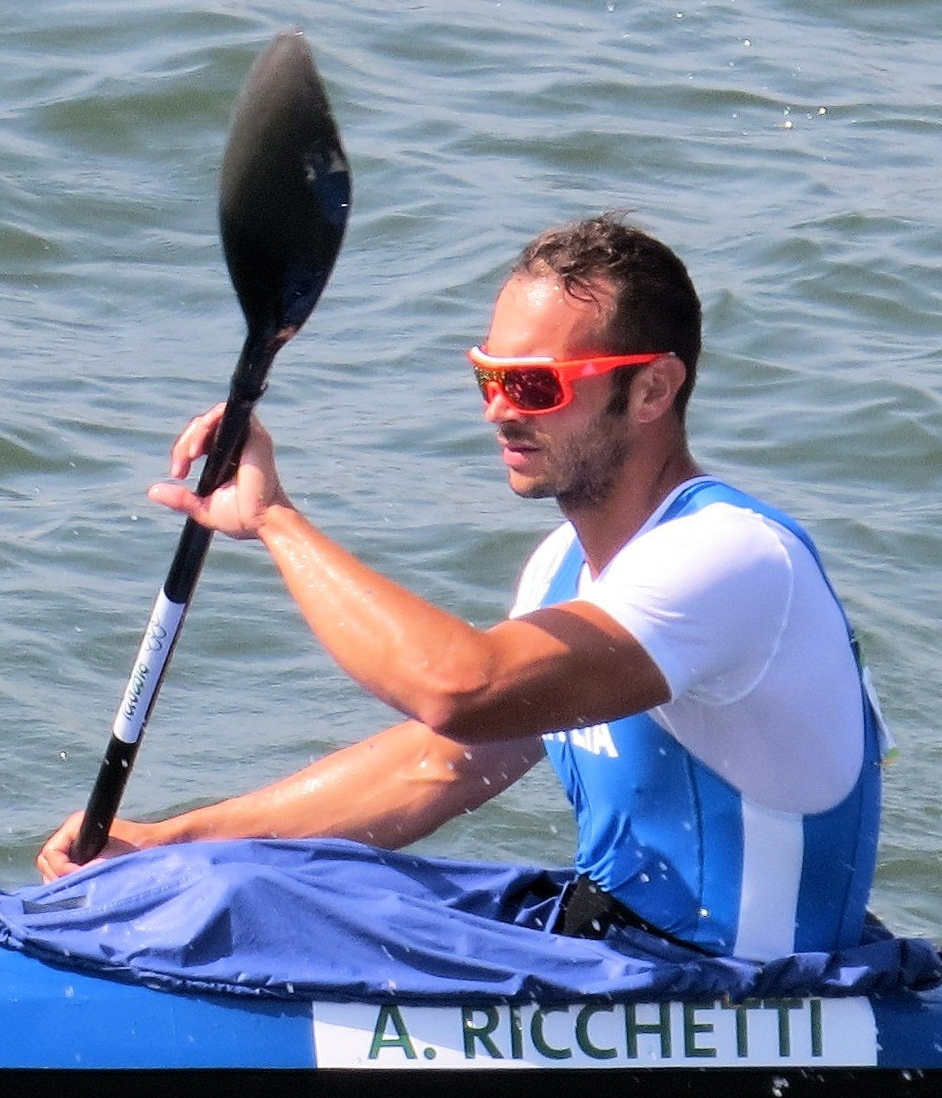
- Ricchetti at the 2016 Olympics

Personal information
- Born: 26 May 1985 (age 41) Omegna, Italy
- Height: 186 cm (6 ft 1 in)
- Weight: 88 kg (194 lb)

Sport
- Sport: Canoe sprint
- Club: Fiamme Gialle
- Coached by: Claudio Ghelardini (club); Antonio Cannone (national); Giuseppe Buonfiglio (national)

Alberto Ricchetti (born 26 May 1985) is an Italian canoe sprinter who competed at the 2008 and 2016 Olympics. In 2008 he finished fourth the K-4 1000 m event. In 2016 he placed 13th–14th in the K-2 200 m and K-4 1000 m events and failed to reach the K-1 1000 m final.
