= Mauro Crenna =

Italian canoeist (born 1991)

Personal information
- Born: 2 November 1991 (age 34)

Sport
- Sport: Canoe sprint

Mauro Crenna (born 2 November 1991) is an Italian canoeist. He competed in the men's K-2 200 metres event at the 2016 Summer Olympics.
