= Canoe sprint at the 2015 European Games – Men's K-4 1000 metres =

Men's K-4 1000 metres at the 2015 European Games
- Venue: Kur Sport and Rowing Centre, Mingachevir
- Date: 14–16 June
- Competitors: 40 from 10 nations
- Winning time: 3:07.063

Medalists
gold medal	Zoltán Kammerer; Tamás Kulifai; Dávid Tóth; Dániel Pauman	Hungary
silver medal	Aleksandr Sergeyev; Anton Ryakhov; Vasily Pogreban; Vladislav Blintsov	Russia
bronze medal	Pavel Miadzvedzeu; Vitaliy Bialko; Aleh Yurenia; Raman Piatrushenka	Belarus

The men's K-4 1000 metres canoe sprint competition at the 2015 European Games in Baku took place between 14 and 16 June at the Kur Sport and Rowing Centre in Mingachevir.

== Schedule ==
The schedule was as follows:

Date	Time	Round
Sunday 14 June 2015	13:35	Heats
Sunday 14 June 2015	17:24	Semifinal
Tuesday 16 June 2015	11:26	Final

All times are Azerbaijan Summer Time (UTC+5)

== Results ==
=== Heats ===
The fastest three boats in each heat advanced directly to the final. The next four fastest boats in each heat, plus the fastest remaining boat advanced to the semifinal.

==== Heat 1 ====
Rank	Kayakers	Country	Time	Notes
1	Zoltán Kammerer; Tamás Kulifai; Dávid Tóth; Dániel Pauman	Hungary	2:50.083	QF, GB
2	Pavel Miadzvedzeu; Vitaliy Bialko; Aleh Yurenia; Raman Piatrushenka	Belarus	2:50.643	QF
3	Daniel Havel; Josef Dostál; Lukáš Trefil; Jan Štěrba	Czech Republic	2:51.332	QF
4	Simo Boltić; Ervin Holpert; Vladimir Torubarov; Dejan Terzić	Serbia	2:52.417	QS
5	Martin Schubert; Lukas Reuschenbach; Kostja Stroinski; Kai Spenner	Germany	2:55.990	QS
6	Aleksandr Sergeyev; Anton Ryakhov; Vasily Pogreban; Vladislav Blintsov	Russia	3:01.368	QS

==== Heat 2 ====
Rank	Kayakers	Country	Time	Notes
1	Rafał Maroń; Paweł Szandrach; Paweł Florczak; Mariusz Kujawski	Poland	2:52.420	QF
2	Fernando Pimenta; Emanuel Silva; João Ribeiro; David Fernandes	Portugal	2:53.152	QF
3	Daniel Burciu; Constantin Mironescu; Valentin Cameneschi; Petrus Gavrila	Romania	2:53.698	QF
4	Marek Krajčovič; Gábor Jakubík; Matej Michálek; Viktor Demin	Slovakia	2:54.252	QS

=== Semifinal ===
The fastest three boats advanced to the final.

Rank	Kayakers	Country	Time	Notes
1	Marek Krajčovič; Gábor Jakubík; Matej Michálek; Viktor Demin	Slovakia	2:50.523	QF
2	Simo Boltić; Ervin Holpert; Vladimir Torubarov; Dejan Terzić	Serbia	2:50.640	QF
3	Aleksandr Sergeyev; Anton Ryakhov; Vasily Pogreban; Vladislav Blintsov	Russia	2:50.884	QF
4	Martin Schubert; Lukas Reuschenbach; Kostja Stroinski; Kai Spenner	Germany	2:53.049	

=== Final ===
Competitors in this final raced for positions 1 to 9, with medals going to the top three.

Rank	Kayakers	Country	Time
1st place, gold medalist(s)	Zoltán Kammerer; Tamás Kulifai; Dávid Tóth; Dániel Pauman	Hungary	3:07.063
2nd place, silver medalist(s)	Aleksandr Sergeyev; Anton Ryakhov; Vasily Pogreban; Vladislav Blintsov	Russia	3:08.034
3rd place, bronze medalist(s)	Pavel Miadzvedzeu; Vitaliy Bialko; Aleh Yurenia; Raman Piatrushenka	Belarus	3:08.827
4	Daniel Havel; Josef Dostál; Lukáš Trefil; Jan Štěrba	Czech Republic	3:08.885
5	Fernando Pimenta; Emanuel Silva; João Ribeiro; David Fernandes	Portugal	3:09.010
6	Simo Boltić; Ervin Holpert; Vladimir Torubarov; Dejan Terzić	Serbia	3:10.740
7	Marek Krajčovič; Gábor Jakubík; Matej Michálek; Viktor Demin	Slovakia	3:10.773
8	Rafał Maroń; Paweł Szandrach; Paweł Florczak; Mariusz Kujawski	Poland	3:11.987
9	Daniel Burciu; Constantin Mironescu; Valentin Cameneschi; Petrus Gavrila	Romania	3:12.615
