= 2018 ICF Canoe Sprint World Championships – Men's K-2 500 metres =

Men's K-2 500 metres at the 2018 ICF Canoe Sprint World Championships
- Venue: Centro de Alto Rendimento de Montemor-o-Velho
- Location: Montemor-o-Velho, Portugal
- Dates: 24–26 August
- Competitors: 38 from 19 nations
- Winning time: 1:30.666

Medalists
gold medal	Artem Kuzakhmetov; Vladislav Blintcov	Russia
silver medal	Stefan Vekić; Vladimir Torubarov	Serbia
bronze medal	Ričardas Nekriošius; Andrej Olijnik	Lithuania

The men's K-2 500 metres competition at the 2018 ICF Canoe Sprint World Championships in Montemor-o-Velho took place at the Centro de Alto Rendimento de Montemor-o-Velho.

== Schedule ==
The schedule was as follows:

Date	Time	Round
Thursday 24 August 2017	18:30	Heats
Saturday 26 August 2017	10:45	Semifinals
Saturday 26 August 2017	12:39	Final A
Saturday 26 August 2017	13:56	Final B

All times are Western European Summer Time (UTC+1)

== Results ==
=== Heats ===
Heat winners advanced directly to the A final. The next six fastest boats in each heat advanced to the semifinals.

==== Heat 1 ====
Rank	Kayakers	Country	Time	Notes
1	Ričardas Nekriošius; Andrej Olijnik	Lithuania	1:31.039	QA
2	Albert Marti; Juan Oriyés	Spain	1:33.086	QS
3	Riley Fitzsimmons; Jordan Wood	Australia	1:33.842	QS
4	Lukáš Nepraš; Lukáš Trefil	Czech Republic	1:34.516	QS
5	Yusuke Miyata; Kenta Chikamura	Japan	1:37.673	QS
6	Abdelmajid Jabbour; Ossama Bousserra	Morocco	1:53.077	QS

==== Heat 2 ====
Rank	Kayakers	Country	Time	Notes
1	Artem Kuzakhmetov; Vladislav Blintcov	Russia	1:30.844	QA
2	Stefan Vekić; Vladimir Torubarov	Serbia	1:32.138	QS
3	Dávid Tóth; Tamás Kulifai	Hungary	1:33.704	QS
4	Juan Ignacio Cáceres; Abraham Dietz	Argentina	1:36.725	QS
5	Edvards Ceipe; Kristofers Lamberts	Latvia	1:38.325	QS
6	Hamish Lovemore; Cameron Hudson	South Africa	1:43.322	QS

==== Heat 3 ====
Rank	Kayakers	Country	Time	Notes
1	Erik Vlček; Juraj Tarr	Slovakia	1:30.997	QA
2	Cyrille Carré; Francis Mouget	France	1:32.360	QS
3	Saeid Fazloula; Kostja Stroinski	Germany	1:33.994	QS
4	Theodor Orban; David Johansson	Sweden	1:34.781	QS
5	Hakeem Teland; Lars Hjemdal	Norway	1:35.011	QS
6	Vitalii Brezitskyi; Vasyl Chedryk	Ukraine	1:37.641	QS
7	David Fernandes; Artur Pereira	Portugal	1:40.304	QS

=== Semifinals ===
Qualification was as follows:

The fastest three boats in each semi advanced to the A final.
The next four fastest boats in each semi, plus the fastest remaining boat advanced to the B final.

==== Semifinal 1 ====
Rank	Kayakers	Country	Time	Notes
1	Cyrille Carré; Francis Mouget	France	1:31.220	QA
2	Dávid Tóth; Tamás Kulifai	Hungary	1:33.120	QA
3	Juan Ignacio Cáceres; Abraham Dietz	Argentina	1:33.153	QA
4	Theodor Orban; David Johansson	Sweden	1:33.810	QB
5	Yusuke Miyata; Kenta Chikamura	Japan	1:35.720	QB
6	David Fernandes; Artur Pereira	Portugal	1:37.747	QB
7	Hamish Lovemore; Cameron Hudson	South Africa	1:40.244	QB
8	Abdelmajid Jabbour; Ossama Bousserra	Morocco	1:45.937	qB
9	Riley Fitzsimmons; Jordan Wood	Australia	1:51.244	

==== Semifinal 2 ====
Rank	Kayakers	Country	Time	Notes
1	Stefan Vekić; Vladimir Torubarov	Serbia	1:32.114	QA
2	Albert Marti; Juan Oriyés	Spain	1:32.321	QA
3	Saeid Fazloula; Kostja Stroinski	Germany	1:32.627	QA
4	Lukáš Nepraš; Lukáš Trefil	Czech Republic	1:32.974	QB
5	Hakeem Teland; Lars Hjemdal	Norway	1:34.111	QB
6	Vitalii Brezitskyi; Vasyl Chedryk	Ukraine	1:38.764	QB
7	Edvards Ceipe; Kristofers Lamberts	Latvia	1:47.145	QB

=== Finals ===
==== Final B ====
Competitors in this final raced for positions 10 to 18.

Rank	Kayakers	Country	Time
1	Lukáš Nepraš; Lukáš Trefil	Czech Republic	1:34.717
2	Hakeem Teland; Lars Hjemdal	Norway	1:35.193
3	Theodor Orban; David Johansson	Sweden	1:36.833
4	Yusuke Miyata; Kenta Chikamura	Japan	1:37.477
5	David Fernandes; Artur Pereira	Portugal	1:37.673
6	Vitalii Brezitskyi; Vasyl Chedryk	Ukraine	1:38.110
7	Hamish Lovemore; Cameron Hudson	South Africa	1:42.070
8	Edvards Ceipe; Kristofers Lamberts	Latvia	1:55.052
–	Abdelmajid Jabbour; Ossama Bousserra	Morocco	DNS

==== Final A ====
Competitors in this final raced for positions 1 to 9, with medals going to the top three.

Rank	Kayakers	Country	Time
1st place, gold medalist(s)	Artem Kuzakhmetov; Vladislav Blintcov	Russia	1:30.666
2nd place, silver medalist(s)	Stefan Vekić; Vladimir Torubarov	Serbia	1:30.953
3rd place, bronze medalist(s)	Ričardas Nekriošius; Andrej Olijnik	Lithuania	1:31.449
4	Cyrille Carré; Francis Mouget	France	1:31.786
5	Erik Vlček; Juraj Tarr	Slovakia	1:31.886
6	Dávid Tóth; Tamás Kulifai	Hungary	1:32.243
7	Albert Marti; Juan Oriyés	Spain	1:33.469
8	Saeid Fazloula; Kostja Stroinski	Germany	1:33.606
9	Juan Ignacio Cáceres; Abraham Dietz	Argentina	1:38.626
