= 2017 ICF Canoe Sprint World Championships – Men's K-4 1000 metres =

Men's K-4 1000 metres at the 2017 ICF Canoe Sprint World Championships
- Venue: Sportcentrum Račice
- Location: Račice, Czech Republic
- Dates: 25–27 August
- Competitors: 52 from 13 nations
- Winning time: 2:50.576

Medalists
gold medal	Kenny Wallace; Jordan Wood; Riley Fitzsimmons; Murray Stewart	Australia
silver medal	Zoltán Kammerer; Dániel Pauman; Dávid Tóth; Benjámin Ceiner	Hungary
bronze medal	Kai Spenner; Lukas Reuschenbach; Kostja Stroinski; Tamás Gecső	Germany

The men's K-4 1000 metres competition at the 2017 ICF Canoe Sprint World Championships in Račice took place at the Sportcentrum Račice.

== Schedule ==
The schedule was as follows:

Date	Time	Round
Friday 25 August 2017	09:00	Heats
Friday 25 August 2017	17:43	Semifinal
Sunday 27 August 2017	10:02	Final

All times are Central European Summer Time (UTC+2)

== Results ==
=== Heats ===
The fastest three boats in each heat advanced directly to the final. The next four fastest boats in each heat, plus the fastest remaining boat advanced to the semifinal.

==== Heat 1 ====
Rank	Kayakers	Country	Time	Notes
1	Javier Hernanz; Javier Cabañín; Óscar Carrera; Rubén Millán	Spain	2:48.611	QF
2	Kenny Wallace; Jordan Wood; Riley Fitzsimmons; Murray Stewart	Australia	2:48.678	QF
3	Kai Spenner; Lukas Reuschenbach; Kostja Stroinski; Tamás Gecső	Germany	2:55.872	QF
4	Martin Nemček; Milan Fraňa; Samo Balaz; Gábor Jakubík	Slovakia	2:58.089	QS
5	Samuele Burgo; Luca Beccaro; Tommaso Freschi; Matteo Torneo	Italy	3:03.722	QS
6	Jakub Michalski; Dorian Kliczkowski; Norbert Kuczyński; Patryk Switalski	Poland	3:06.550	QS
7	Maizir Riyondra; Andri Sugiarto; Sutrisno Sutrisno; Tri Wahyu Buwono	Indonesia	3:21.817	QS

==== Heat 2 ====
Rank	Kayakers	Country	Time	Notes
1	Zoltán Kammerer; Dániel Pauman; Dávid Tóth; Benjámin Ceiner	Hungary	2:56.489	QF
2	Aliaksei Misiuchenka; Pavel Miadzvedzeu; Yuri Tkachou; Ilya Fedarenka	Belarus	2:58.445	QF
3	Aleksandr Sergeyev; Vasily Pogreban; Ruslan Mamutov; Nikolay Chervov	Russia	2:58.484	QF
4	Pavel Davidek; Tomáš Veselý; Lukáš Nepraš; Lukáš Trefil	Czech Republic	2:58.550	QS
5	Yavuz Selim Balci; Fahri Ayvaz; Mustafa Özmen; Engin Erkan	Turkey	3:13.439	QS
6	Zhang Yu; Li Fu; Yang Junling; Wu Minzhe	China	3:16.739	QS

=== Semifinal ===
The fastest three boats advanced to the final.

Rank	Kayakers	Country	Time	Notes
1	Martin Nemček; Milan Fraňa; Samo Balaz; Gábor Jakubík	Slovakia	2:55.688	QF
2	Samuele Burgo; Luca Beccaro; Tommaso Freschi; Matteo Torneo	Italy	2:56.327	QF
3	Pavel Davidek; Tomáš Veselý; Lukáš Nepraš; Lukáš Trefil	Czech Republic	2:58.927	QF
4	Jakub Michalski; Dorian Kliczkowski; Norbert Kuczyński; Patryk Switalski	Poland	3:00.616	
5	Yavuz Selim Balci; Fahri Ayvaz; Mustafa Özmen; Engin Erkan	Turkey	3:01.927	
6	Zhang Yu; Li Fu; Yang Junling; Wu Minzhe	China	3:07.650	
7	Maizir Riyondra; Andri Sugiarto; Sutrisno Sutrisno; Tri Wahyu Buwono	Indonesia	3:08.466	

=== Final ===
Competitors raced for positions 1 to 9, with medals going to the top three.

Rank	Kayakers	Country	Time
1st place, gold medalist(s)	Kenny Wallace; Jordan Wood; Riley Fitzsimmons; Murray Stewart	Australia	2:50.576
2nd place, silver medalist(s)	Zoltán Kammerer; Dániel Pauman; Dávid Tóth; Benjámin Ceiner	Hungary	2:50.931
3rd place, bronze medalist(s)	Kai Spenner; Lukas Reuschenbach; Kostja Stroinski; Tamás Gecső	Germany	2:53.146
4	Javier Hernanz; Javier Cabañín; Óscar Carrera; Rubén Millán	Spain	2:54.076
5	Martin Nemček; Milan Fraňa; Samo Balaz; Gábor Jakubík	Slovakia	2:55.416
6	Aliaksei Misiuchenka; Pavel Miadzvedzeu; Yuri Tkachou; Ilya Fedarenka	Belarus	2:56.796
7	Samuele Burgo; Luca Beccaro; Tommaso Freschi; Matteo Torneo	Italy	2:56.946
8	Pavel Davidek; Tomáš Veselý; Lukáš Nepraš; Lukáš Trefil	Czech Republic	2:58.326
9	Aleksandr Sergeyev; Vasily Pogreban; Ruslan Mamutov; Nikolay Chervov	Russia	3:03.521
