= Canoe sprint at the 2015 European Games – Men's K-1 5000 metres =

Men's K-1 5000 metres at the 2015 European Games
- Venue: Kur Sport and Rowing Centre, Mingachevir
- Date: 16 June
- Competitors: 29 from 29 nations
- Winning time: 20:01.864

Medalists
| gold medal | Max Hoff | Germany |
| silver medal | Fernando Pimenta | Portugal |
| bronze medal | Cyrille Carré | France |

The men's K-1 5000 metres canoe sprint competition at the 2015 European Games in Baku took place on 16 June at the Kur Sport and Rowing Centre in Mingachevir.

== Schedule ==
The schedule was as follows:

| Date | Time | Round |
|---|---|---|
| Tuesday 16 June 2015 | 17:05 | Final |

All times are Azerbaijan Summer Time (UTC+5)

== Results ==
As a long-distance event, it was held as a direct final.

| Rank | Kayaker | Country | Time |
|---|---|---|---|
| 1st place, gold medalist(s) | Max Hoff | Germany | 20:01.864 GB |
| 2nd place, silver medalist(s) | Fernando Pimenta | Portugal | 20:11.989 |
| 3rd place, bronze medalist(s) | Cyrille Carré | France | 20:42.081 |
| 4 | Aleh Yurenia | Belarus | 20:52.003 |
| 5 | Dániel Pauman | Hungary | 20:53.776 |
| 6 | Lukáš Trefil | Czech Republic | 20:59.157 |
| 7 | Nikolay Chervov | Russia | 21:18.387 |
| 8 | Laurens Pannecoucke | Belgium | 21:29.569 |
| 9 | Fabio Wyss | Switzerland | 21:32.391 |
| 10 | Miika Dietrich | Finland | 21:36.697 |
| 11 | Milenko Zorić | Serbia | 21:46.941 |
| 12 | Jošt Zakrajšek | Slovenia | 21:49.421 |
| 13 | Vitaliy Tsurkan | Ukraine | 21:50.950 |
| 14 | Christoph Kornfeind | Austria | 21:52.276 |
| 15 | Martin Brzeziński | Poland | 22:14.459 |
| 16 | Marek Krajčovič | Slovakia | 22:30.158 |
| 17 | Roi Rodríguez | Spain | 22:34.354 |
| 18 | Giulio Dressino | Italy | 22:36.923 |
| 19 | Darko Savić | Bosnia and Herzegovina | 22:53.688 |
| 20 | Kyriakos Syriopoulos | Greece | 23:12.512 |
| 21 | Peter Egan | Ireland | 23:13.183 |
| 22 | Antun Novaković | Croatia | 23:47.300 |
| – | Mirnazim Javadov | Azerbaijan | DNF |
| – | Andreas Diamantis | Cyprus | DNF |
| – | René Holten Poulsen | Denmark | DNF |
| – | Timothy Pendle | Great Britain | DNF |
| – | Konstantin Dejkoski | Macedonia | DNF |
| – | Daniel Salbu | Norway | DSQ |
| – | Gábor Bozsik | Turkey | DSQ |
