= Canoeing at the 2020 Summer Olympics – Men's K-2 1000 metres =

Olympic canoeing event

Men's K-2 1000 metres at the Games of the XXXII Olympiad
- Canoeing pictogram
- Venue: Sea Forest Waterway
- Dates: 4 August 2021 (heats and quarterfinal); 5 August 2021 (semifinal & final)
- Competitors: 32 (16 boats) from 14 nations
- Winning time: 3:15.280

Medalists
1st place, gold medalist(s)		Jean van der Westhuyzen; Thomas Green; Australia
2nd place, silver medalist(s)		Max Hoff; Jacob Schopf; Germany
3rd place, bronze medalist(s)		Josef Dostál; Radek Šlouf; Czech Republic

The men's K-2 1000 metres sprint canoeing event at the 2020 Summer Olympics took place on 4 and 5 August 2021 at the Sea Forest Waterway. At least 20 canoeists (10 boats of 2) from at least 10 nations competed.

== Background ==
This was the 20th appearance of the event, one of four events that have been held at every Summer Olympics since the introduction of canoeing in 1936.

The reigning World Champions are Max Hoff and Jacob Schopf of Germany, who have been named to the German team. The reigning Olympic champions are Max Rendschmidt and Marcus Gross, also of Germany; Rendschmidt has been named to the team, but Gross has not.

== Qualification ==
A National Olympic Committee (NOC) could qualify one place in the event, though could enter up to 2 boats if it earned enough quota places through other men's kayak events. A total of 13 qualification places were available, initially allocated as follows:

- 6 places awarded through the 2019 ICF Canoe Sprint World Championships
- 3 places awarded to 3 continents (excluding Europe) through the World Championships, which are then competed for at continental tournaments
- 1 place awarded through a European continental tournament

Qualifying places were awarded to the NOC, not to the individual canoeist who earned the place.

The three continental spots were awarded to the Americas (#14 Canada), Oceania (#15 New Zealand), and Asia (#21 Japan); Africa had the lowest next-ranked team (#24 South Africa). The continental tournaments were won by Canada (via World Championship rather than continental tournament, which was cancelled), China, Hungary, and New Zealand. The World Championships places were allocated as follows:

Rank	Kayaker	Nation	Qualification	Selected competitors
1	Max Hoff; Jacob Schopf	Germany	Quota #1 in K-2 (#1, #2 athlete quotas)	Max Hoff; Jacob Schopf
2	Francisco Cubelos; Iñigo Peña	Spain	Quota #2 in K-2 (#3, #4 athlete quotas)	
3	Cyrille Carré; Étienne Hubert	France	Quota #3 in K-2 (#5, #6 athlete quotas)	
4	Josef Dostál; Radek Šlouf	Czech Republic	Quota #4 in K-2 (#7, #8 athlete quotas)	
5	Jordan Wood; Riley Fitzsimmons	Australia	Quota #5 in K-2 (#9, #10 athlete quotas)	
6	Luca Beccaro; Samuele Burgo	Italy	Quota #6 in K-2 (#11, #12 athlete quotas)	

Continental places:

Nation	Qualification	Selected competitor
Canada	Americas quota in K-2 500 m	
China	Asia quota in K-2 500 m	
Hungary	Europe quota in K-2 500 m	
New Zealand	Oceania quota in K-2 500 m	

Nations with women's kayak quota spots from the K-1 200 metres, K-1 500 metres, or K-4 500 metres could enter (additional) boats as well.

== Competition format ==
Sprint canoeing uses a four-round format for events with at least 11 boats, with heats, quarterfinals, semifinals, and finals. The specifics of the progression format depend on the number of boats ultimately entered.

The course is a flatwater course 9 metres wide. The name of the event describes the particular format within sprint canoeing. The "K" format means a kayak, with the canoeist sitting, using a double-bladed paddle to paddle, and steering with a foot-operated rudder (as opposed to a canoe, with a kneeling canoeist, single-bladed paddle, and no rudder). The "2" is the number of canoeists in each boat. The "1000 metres" is the distance of each race.

== Schedule ==
The event was held over two consecutive days, with two rounds per day. All sessions started at 9:30 a.m. local time, though there are multiple events with races in each session.

Legend
H	Heats	¼	Quarter-finals	½	Semi-finals	F	Final

Sprint
Event↓/Date →	Mon 2	Tue 3	Wed 4		Thu 5		Fri 6	Sat 7
Men's K-2 1000 m			H	¼	½	F		

== Results ==
=== Heats ===
Progression System: 1st-2nd to SF, rest to QF.

==== Heat 1 ====
Rank	Lane	Canoer	Country	Time	Notes
1	7	Jean van der Westhuyzen; Thomas Green	Australia	3:08.773	OB, SF
2	5	Max Hoff; Jacob Schopf	Germany	3:09.830	SF
3	4	Samuel Baláž; Adam Botek	Slovakia	3:13.982	QF
4	2	Max Brown; Kurtis Imrie	New Zealand	3:17.210	QF
5	3	Mikita Borykau; Aleh Yurenia	Belarus	3:18.952	QF
6	6	Brian Malfesi; Vincent Jourdenais	Canada	3:22.068	QF

==== Heat 2 ====
Rank	Lane	Canoer	Country	Time	Notes
1	2	Bence Nádas; Bálint Kopasz	Hungary	3:11.877	SF
2	5	Josef Dostál; Radek Šlouf	Czech Republic	3:13.425	SF
3	6	Riley Fitzsimmons; Jordan Wood	Australia	3:18.453	QF
4	3	Samuele Burgo; Luca Beccaro	Italy	3:28.047	QF
5	4	Étienne Hubert; Guillaume Burger	France	3:29.296	QF

==== Heat 3 ====
Rank	Lane	Canoer	Country	Time	Notes
1	4	Francisco Cubelos; Íñigo Peña	Spain	3:10.138	SF
2	6	Wang Congkang; Bu Tingkai	China	3:10.292	SF
3	5	Maxim Spesivtsev; Roman Anoshkin	ROC	3:20.610	QF
4	3	Kornél Béke; Ádám Varga	Hungary	3:26.732	QF
5	2	Tuva'a Clifton; Rudolf Williams	Samoa	3:55.617	QF

=== Quarterfinals ===
Progression System: 1st-3rd to SF, rest to Final B.

==== Quarterfinal 1 ====
Rank	Lane	Canoer	Country	Time	Notes
1	2	Mikita Borykau; Aleh Yurenia	Belarus	3:10.126	SF
2	4	Max Brown; Kurtis Imrie	New Zealand	3:10.220	SF
3	3	Samuele Burgo; Luca Beccaro	Italy	3:12.667	SF
4	5	Maxim Spesivtsev; Roman Anoshkin	ROC	3:14.045	FB
5	6	Étienne Hubert; Guillaume Burger	France	3:18.284	FB

==== Quarterfinal 2 ====
Rank	Lane	Canoer	Country	Time	Notes
1	4	Riley Fitzsimmons; Jordan Wood	Australia	3:10.619	SF
2	5	Samuel Baláž; Adam Botek	Slovakia	3:11.458	SF
3	3	Kornél Béke; Ádám Varga	Hungary	3:15.225	SF
4	6	Brian Malfesi; Vincent Jourdenais	Canada	3:15.736	FB
5	2	Tuva'a Clifton; Rudolf Williams	Samoa	3:46.523	FB

=== Semifinals ===
Progression System: 1st-4th to Final A, rest to Final B.

==== Semifinal 1 ====
Rank	Lane	Canoer	Country	Time	Notes
1	4	Jean van der Westhuyzen; Thomas Green	Australia	3:17.077	FA
2	2	Max Brown; Kurtis Imrie	New Zealand	3:17.684	FA
3	3	Wang Congkang; Bu Tingkai	China	3:17.784	FA
4	5	Josef Dostál; Radek Šlouf	Czech Republic	3:18.240	FA
5	7	Samuele Burgo; Luca Beccaro	Italy	3:20.591	FB
6	6	Riley Fitzsimmons; Jordan Wood	Australia	3:21.860	FB

==== Semifinal 2 ====
Rank	Lane	Canoer	Country	Time	Notes
1	3	Max Hoff; Jacob Schopf	Germany	3:17.554	FA
2	5	Bence Nádas; Bálint Kopasz	Hungary	3:18.316	FA
3	6	Mikita Borykau; Aleh Yurenia	Belarus	3:18.875	FA
4	4	Francisco Cubelos; Íñigo Peña	Spain	3:19.133	FA
5	7	Kornél Béke; Ádám Varga	Hungary	3:20.197	FB
6	2	Samuel Baláž; Adam Botek	Slovakia	3:20.917	FB

=== Finals ===
==== Final A ====
Rank	Lane	Canoer	Country	Time	Notes
1st place, gold medalist(s)	5	Jean van der Westhuyzen; Thomas Green	Australia	3:15.280	
2nd place, silver medalist(s)	4	Max Hoff; Jacob Schopf	Germany	3:15.584	
3rd place, bronze medalist(s)	1	Josef Dostál; Radek Šlouf	Czech Republic	3:16.106	
4	6	Bence Nádas; Bálint Kopasz	Hungary	3:16.535	
5	3	Max Brown; Kurtis Imrie	New Zealand	3:17.267	
6	8	Francisco Cubelos; Íñigo Peña	Spain	3:17.327	
7	2	Mikita Borykau; Aleh Yurenia	Belarus	3:17.769	
8	7	Wang Congkang; Bu Tingkai	China	3:19.612	

==== Final B ====
Rank	Lane	Canoer	Country	Time	Notes
9	2	Maxim Spesivtsev; Roman Anoshkin	ROC	3:19.680	
10	6	Samuel Baláž; Adam Botek	Slovakia	3:21.087	
11	5	Samuele Burgo; Luca Beccaro	Italy	3:22.408	
12	4	Kornél Béke; Ádám Varga	Hungary	3:24.223	
13	3	Riley Fitzsimmons; Jordan Wood	Australia	3:24.757	
14	7	Brian Malfesi; Vincent Jourdenais	Canada	3:25.181	
15	8	Étienne Hubert; Guillaume Burger	France	3:32.690	
16	1	Tuva'a Clifton; Rudolf Williams	Samoa	3:56.171	
