= 2018 ICF Canoe Sprint World Championships – Men's K-4 1000 metres =

Men's K-4 1000 metres at the 2018 ICF Canoe Sprint World Championships
- Venue: Centro de Alto Rendimento de Montemor-o-Velho
- Location: Montemor-o-Velho, Portugal
- Dates: 25 August
- Competitors: 32 from 8 nations
- Winning time: 2:57.947

Medalists
| gold medal | Tamás Gecső; Jakob Thordsen; Jacob Schopf; Lukas Reuschenbach | Germany |
| silver medal | Samuel Baláž; Juraj Tarr; Erik Vlček; Gábor Jakubík | Slovakia |
| bronze medal | Francisco Cubelos; Rubén Millán; Pelayo Roza; Iñigo Peña | Spain |

The men's K-4 1000 metres competition at the 2018 ICF Canoe Sprint World Championships in Montemor-o-Velho took place at the Centro de Alto Rendimento de Montemor-o-Velho.

== Schedule ==
The schedule was as follows:

| Date | Time | Round |
|---|---|---|
| Saturday 25 August 2018 | 13:26 | Final |

All times are Western European Summer Time (UTC+1)

== Results ==
With fewer than ten competitors entered, this event was held as a direct final.

| Rank | Kayakers | Country | Time |
|---|---|---|---|
| 1st place, gold medalist(s) | Tamás Gecső; Jakob Thordsen; Jacob Schopf; Lukas Reuschenbach | Germany | 2:57.947 |
| 2nd place, silver medalist(s) | Samuel Baláž; Juraj Tarr; Erik Vlček; Gábor Jakubík | Slovakia | 2:58.914 |
| 3rd place, bronze medalist(s) | Francisco Cubelos; Rubén Millán; Pelayo Roza; Iñigo Peña | Spain | 2:59.341 |
| 4 | Vladislav Litovka; Oleg Siniavin; Maxim Spesivtsev; Oleg Zhestkov | Russia | 2:59.981 |
| 5 | Pavel Miadzvedzeu; Mikita Borykau; Aleh Yurenia; Ihar Baicheuski | Belarus | 3:01.801 |
| 6 | Dávid Tóth; Gábor Bogár; Róbert Ilyés; Benjámin Ceiner | Hungary | 3:02.821 |
| 7 | Viliyan Buchvarov; Hristo Rekov; Todor Kolevski; Veselin Vulchov | Bulgaria | 3:04.468 |
| 8 | Luis Ferreira; João Pereira; Igor Pinho; Ruben Boas | Portugal | 3:11.665 |
