= Hungary at the 2020 Summer Olympics =

- IOC code: HUN
- NOC: Hungarian Olympic Committee
- Website: www.olimpia.hu (in Hungarian and English)

in Tokyo, Japan 23 July 2021 – 8 August 2021
- Competitors: 169 in 22 sports
- Flag bearers (opening): Aida Mohamed; László Cseh
- Flag bearer (closing): Bálint Kopasz
- Medals Ranked 15th: Gold 6 Silver 7 Bronze 7 Total 20

Summer Olympics appearances (overview)
- 1896; 1900; 1904; 1908; 1912; 1920; 1924; 1928; 1932; 1936; 1948; 1952; 1956; 1960; 1964; 1968; 1972; 1976; 1980; 1984; 1988; 1992; 1996; 2000; 2004; 2008; 2012; 2016; 2020; 2024; 2028

Other related appearances
- 1906 Intercalated Games

Hungary competed at the 2020 Summer Olympics in Tokyo. Originally scheduled to take place from 24 July to 9 August 2020, the Games were postponed to 23 July to 8 August 2021, because of the COVID-19 pandemic. Hungarian athletes have appeared in every edition of the Summer Olympic Games, except for two occasions. Hungary was not invited to the 1920 Summer Olympics in Antwerp, because of its role in the first World War, and was also part of the Soviet boycott, when Los Angeles hosted the 1984 Summer Olympics.

== Medalists ==
The following Hungarian competitors won medals at the games. In the discipline sections below, the medalists' names are bolded.

Medal	Name	Sport	Event	Date
Gold	Áron Szilágyi	Fencing	Men's sabre	24 July
Gold	Kristóf Milák	Swimming	Men's 200 metre butterfly	28 July
Gold	Bálint Kopasz	Canoeing	Men's K-1 1000 metres	3 August
Gold	Tamás Lőrincz	Wrestling	Men's Greco-Roman 77 kg	3 August
Gold	Sándor Tótka	Canoeing	Men's K-1 200 metres	5 August
Gold	Danuta Kozák; Tamara Csipes; Anna Kárász; Dóra Bodonyi	Canoeing	Women's K-4 500 metres	7 August
Silver	Gergely Siklósi	Fencing	Men's épée	25 July
Silver	Kristóf Milák	Swimming	Men's 100 metre butterfly	31 July
Silver	Ádám Varga	Canoeing	Men's K-1 1000 metres	3 August
Silver	Zsombor Berecz	Sailing	Men's finn	3 August
Silver	Viktor Lőrincz	Wrestling	Men's Greco-Roman 87 kg	4 August
Silver	Kristóf Rasovszky	Swimming	Men's 10 kilometre open water	5 August
Silver	Tamara Csipes	Canoeing	Women's K-1 500 metres	5 August
Bronze	Áron Szilágyi; András Szatmári; Tamás Decsi; Csanád Gémesi	Fencing	Men's team sabre	28 July
Bronze	Krisztián Tóth	Judo	Men's 90kg	28 July
Bronze	Danuta Kozák; Dóra Bodonyi	Canoeing	Women's K-2 500 metres	3 August
Bronze	Sarolta Kovács	Modern pentathlon	Women's individual	6 August
Bronze	Gábor Hárspataki	Karate	Men's 75 kg	6 August
Bronze	Hungary women's national water polo team: Edina Gangl; Dorottya Szilágyi; Vanda Vályi; Gréta Gurisatti; Gabriella Szűcs; Rebecca Parkes; Anna Illés; Rita Keszthelyi; Dóra Leimeter; Anikó Gyöngyössy; Natasa Rybanska; Krisztina Garda; Alda Magyari	Water polo	Women's tournament	7 August
Bronze	Hungary men's national water polo team: Viktor Nagy; Dániel Angyal; Krisztián Manhercz; Gergő Zalánki; Márton Vámos; Norbert Hosnyánszky; Mátyás Pásztor; Szilárd Jansik; Balázs Erdélyi; Dénes Varga; Tamás Mezei; Balázs Hárai; Soma Vogel	Water polo	Men's tournament	8 August

Medals by sport
**Sport**	1st place, gold medalist(s)	2nd place, silver medalist(s)	3rd place, bronze medalist(s)	Total
Canoeing	3	2	1	6
Swimming	1	2	0	3
Fencing	1	1	1	3
Wrestling	1	1	0	2
Sailing	0	1	0	1
Water polo	0	0	2	2
Judo	0	0	1	1
Karate	0	0	1	1
Modern pentathlon	0	0	1	1
Total	6	7	7	20

Medals by gender
**Gender**	1st place, gold medalist(s)	2nd place, silver medalist(s)	3rd place, bronze medalist(s)	**Total**
Male	5	6	4	**15**
Female	1	1	3	**5**
Total	6	7	7	20

=== Multiple medalists ===
The following competitors won multiple medals at the 2020 Olympic Games.

Name	Medal	Sport	Event
Kristóf Milák	Gold; Silver	Swimming	Men's 200 m butterfly Men's 100 m butterfly
Tamara Csipes	Gold; Silver	Canoeing	Women's K-4 500 m Women's K-1 500 m
Áron Szilágyi	Gold; Bronze	Fencing	Men's sabre Men's team sabre
Danuta Kozák	Gold; Bronze	Canoeing	Women's K-4 500 m Women's K-2 500 m
Dóra Bodonyi	Gold; Bronze	Canoeing	Women's K-4 500 m Women's K-2 500 m

== Competitors ==
The following is the list of number of competitors in the Games. Note that reserves in handball are not counted:

Sport	Men	Women	Total
Archery	1	0	1
Athletics	7	11	18
Badminton	1	1	2
Boxing	1	0	1
Canoeing	8	8	16
Cycling	2	1	3
Fencing	5	8	13
Gymnastics	0	2	2
Judo	3	4	7
Handball	0	14	14
Karate	1	0	1
Modern pentathlon	2	2	4
Rowing	1	0	1
Sailing	2	2	4
Shooting	2	2	4
Swimming	21	13	34
Table tennis	2	4	6
Taekwondo	1	0	1
Triathlon	2	2	4
Water polo	13	13	26
Weightlifting	1	0	1
Wrestling	5	1	6
Total	81	88	169

Medals by date
Day	Date	1st place, gold medalist(s)	2nd place, silver medalist(s)	3rd place, bronze medalist(s)	Total
Day 1	24 July	1	0	0	1
Day 2	25 July	0	1	0	1
Day 3	26 July	0	0	0	0
Day 4	27 July	0	0	0	0
Day 5	28 July	1	0	2	3
Day 6	29 July	0	0	0	0
Day 7	30 July	0	0	0	0
Day 8	31 July	0	1	0	1
Day 9	1 August	0	0	0	0
Day 10	2 August	0	0	0	0
Day 11	3 August	2	2	1	5
Day 12	4 August	0	1	0	1
Day 13	5 August	1	2	0	3
Day 14	6 August	0	0	2	2
Day 15	7 August	1	0	1	2
Day 16	8 August	0	0	1	1
Total		6	7	7	20

== Archery ==
One Hungarian archer directly qualified for the men's individual recurve at the Games by reaching the quarterfinal stage and obtaining one of seven available spots at the 2021 Final Qualification Tournament in Paris, France.

Athlete	Event	Ranking round		Round of 64	Round of 32	Round of 16	Quarterfinals	Semifinals	Final / BM	
Athlete	Event	Score	Seed	Opposition Score	Opposition Score	Opposition Score	Opposition Score	Opposition Score	Opposition Score	Rank
Mátyás László Balogh	Men's individual	632	61	Kim W-j (KOR); L 0–6	Did not advance					

== Athletics ==
Hungarian athletes further achieved the entry standards, either by qualifying time or by world ranking, in the following track and field events (up to a maximum of 3 athletes in each event):

Key

- Note–Ranks given for track events are within the athlete's heat only
- Q = Qualified for the next round
- q = Qualified for the next round as a fastest loser or, in field events, by position without achieving the qualifying target
- NR = National record
- N/A = Round not applicable for the event
- Bye = Athlete not required to compete in round

Track & road events
Men

Athlete	Event	Heat		Semifinal		Final	
Athlete	Event	Result	Rank	Result	Rank	Result	Rank
István Szögi	1500 m	3:38.79	12	Did not advance			
Valdó Szűcs	110 m hurdles	13.50	3 Q	13.40	4	Did not advance	
Máté Koroknai	400 m hurdles	49.80	6	Did not advance			
Máté Helebrandt	50 km walk	—N/a				3:57:53	17
Bence Venyercsán	50 km walk	—N/a				3:59:05	20

Women

Athlete	Event	Heat		Semifinal		Final	
Athlete	Event	Result	Rank	Result	Rank	Result	Rank
Bianka Kéri	800 m	2:02.82	6	Did not advance			
Luca Kozák	100 m hurdles	12.97	3 Q	DNF		Did not advance	
Zita Kácser	3000 m steeplechase	10.43.99	13	—N/a		Did not advance	
Lili Anna Toth	3000 m steeplechase	9.30.96	7	—N/a		Did not advance	
Barbara Kovács	20 km walk	—N/a				1:41:49	45
Viktória Madarász	20 km walk	—N/a				DNF	

Field events

Athlete	Event	Qualification		Final	
Athlete	Event	Distance	Position	Distance	Position
Norbert Rivasz-Tóth	Men's javelin throw	77.76	22	Did not advance	
Bence Halász	Men's hammer throw	75.39	14	Did not advance	
Anasztázia Nguyen	Women's long jump	6.52	16	Did not advance	
Anita Márton	Women's shot put	17.59	21	Did not advance	
Réka Szilágyi	Women's javelin throw	57.39	25	Did not advance	
Réka Gyurátz	Women's hammer throw	66.48	26	Did not advance	

Combined events – Women's heptathlon

Athlete	Event	100H	HJ	SP	200 m	LJ	JT	800 m	Final	Rank
Xénia Krizsán	Result	13.58	1.74	13.78	24.96	5.88	50.59	2:07.65	6295	13
Xénia Krizsán	Points	1039	903	779	890	813	872	999	6295	13

== Badminton ==
Hungary entered two badminton players (one per gender) into the Olympic tournament. Rio 2016 Olympian Laura Sárosi was selected to compete in the women's singles based on the BWF World Race to Tokyo Rankings. Gergely Krausz will compete in the men's singles after received reallocation quota.

Athlete	Event	Group stage			Elimination	Quarterfinal	Semifinal	Final / BM	
Athlete	Event	Opposition Score	Opposition Score	Rank	Opposition Score	Opposition Score	Opposition Score	Opposition Score	Rank
Gergely Krausz	Men's singles	Ginting (INA); L (13–21, 8–21)	Sirant (ROC); L (18–21, 18–21)	3	Did not advance				
Laura Sárosi	Women's singles	Intanon (THA); L (5–21, 10–21)	Cheah (MAS); L WO	3	Did not advance				

== Boxing ==
Hungary entered one male boxer into the Olympic tournament. Roland Gálos scored a round-of-16 victory to secure a spot in the men's featherweight division at the 2020 European Qualification Tournament in London, United Kingdom.

Athlete	Event	Round of 32	Round of 16	Quarterfinals	Semifinals	Final	
Athlete	Event	Opposition Result	Opposition Result	Opposition Result	Opposition Result	Opposition Result	Rank
Roland Gálos	Men's featherweight	Temirzhanov (KAZ); L 0–5	Did not advance				

== Canoeing ==
=== Sprint ===
Hungarian canoeists qualified six boats in each of the following distances for the Games through the 2019 ICF Canoe Sprint World Championships in Szeged. Meanwhile, two additional boats were awarded to the Hungarian canoeists each in the men's K-2 1000 m and women's C-2 1000 m, respectively, with their top-two placements at the 2021 European Canoe Sprint Qualification Regatta.

Men

Athlete	Event	Heats		Quarterfinals		Semifinals		Final	
Athlete	Event	Time	Rank	Time	Rank	Time	Rank	Time	Rank
Kolos Csizmadia	K-1 200 m	34.442	1 SF	Bye		35.099	1 FA	35.317	4
Sándor Tótka	K-1 200 m	35.070	1 SF	Bye		35.114	1 FA	35.035	1st place, gold medalist(s)
Balázs Adolf	C-1 1000 m	4:01.665	2 SF	Bye		4:09.177	5 FB	4:07.613	15
Dániel Fejes	C-1 1000 m	4:34.000	6 QF	4:21.847	5	Did not advance			
Bálint Kopasz	K-1 1000 m	3:39.084	1 SF	Bye		3:24.558	1 FA	3:20.643	1st place, gold medalist(s)
Ádám Varga	K-1 1000 m	3:39.650	2 SF	Bye		3:23.634	2 FA	3:22.431	2nd place, silver medalist(s)
Balázs Adolf; Dániel Fejes	C-2 1000 m	3:53.964	7 QF	3:53:559	4 FB	—N/a		3:32.076	11
Kornél Béke; Ádám Varga	K-2 1000 m	3:26.732	4 QF	3:15.225	3 SF	3:20.197	5 FB	3:24.223	12
Bálint Kopasz; Bence Nádas	K-2 1000 m	3:11.877	1 SF	Bye		3:18.316	2 FA	3:16.535	4
Kornél Béke; Kolos Csizmadia; Bence Nádas; Sándor Tótka	K-4 500 m	1:34.274	5 QF	1:23.727	1 SF	1:24.918	3 FA	1:25.068	7

Women

Athlete	Event	Heats		Quarterfinals		Semifinals		Final	
Athlete	Event	Time	Rank	Time	Rank	Time	Rank	Time	Rank
Virág Balla	C-1 200 m	46.852	3 QF	46.218	1 SF	48.257	6 FB	47.560	9
Kincső Takács	C-1 200 m	47.977	2 SF	Bye		49.178	8 FB	48.921	14
Anna Kárász	K-1 200 m	41.127	2 SF	Bye		40.724	8 FB	41.242	16
Dóra Lucz	K-1 200 m	41.098	1 SF	Bye		39.713	1 FA	39.442	6
Tamara Csipes	K-1 500 m	1:48.790	1 SF	Bye		1:51.698	1 FA	1:51.855	2nd place, silver medalist(s)
Danuta Kozák	K-1 500 m	1:48.730	1 SF	Bye		1:52.016	1 FA	1:53.414	4
Virág Balla; Kincső Takács	C-2 500 m	2:02.344	2 SF	Bye		2:04.545	3 FA	2:00.289	5
Tamara Csipes; Erika Medveczky	K-2 500 m	1:42.776	1 SF	Bye		1:38.446	2 FA	1:37.117	4
Dóra Bodonyi; Danuta Kozák	K-2 500 m	1:45.735	1 SF	Bye		1:37.912	1 FA	1:36.867	3rd place, bronze medalist(s)
Dóra Bodonyi; Tamara Csipes; Anna Kárász; Danuta Kozák	K-4 500 m	1:33.335	1 SF	—N/a		1:36.529	1 FA	1:35.463	1st place, gold medalist(s)

Qualification Legend: FA = Qualify to final (medal); FB = Qualify to final B (non-medal)

== Cycling ==
=== Road ===
Hungary entered one rider to compete in the men's Olympic road race, by virtue of his top 50 national finish (for men) in the UCI World Ranking.

Athlete	Event	Time	Rank
Attila Valter	Men's road race	Did not finish	

=== Mountain biking ===
Hungarian mountain bikers qualified for one men's and one women's quota place into the Olympic cross-country race, as a result of the nation's twentieth-place finish for men and nineteenth for women, respectively, in the UCI Olympic Ranking List of 16 May 2021.

Athlete	Event	Time	Rank
András Parti	Men's cross-country	1:35:33	32
Kata Blanka Vas	Women's cross-country	1:17:55	4

== Fencing ==
Hungarian fencers qualified a full squad in the men's team sabre at the Games, by finishing among the top four nations in the FIE Olympic Team Rankings, while the women's foil and women's sabre teams claimed the spot each as the highest-ranked nation from the European zone outside the world's top four. Meanwhile, Gergely Siklósi (men's épée) booked an additional spot on the Hungarian roster as one of the two highest-ranked fencers vying for qualification from Europe in the FIE Adjusted Official Rankings.

The fencing squad was officially named on May 28, 2021, with the two-time defending champion Áron Szilágyi in the men's sabre leading the fencers to his fourth consecutive Games.

Men

Athlete	Event	Round of 64	Round of 32	Round of 16	Quarterfinal	Semifinal	Final / BM	
Athlete	Event	Opposition Score	Opposition Score	Opposition Score	Opposition Score	Opposition Score	Opposition Score	Rank
Gergely Siklósi	Épée	Bye	Dong C (CHN); W 15–9	El Kord (MAR); W 15–13	Park S-y (KOR); W 15–12	Santarelli (ITA); W 15–10	Cannone (FRA); L 10–15	2nd place, silver medalist(s)
Tamás Decsi	Sabre	Bye	Hartung (GER); L 8–15	Did not advance				
András Szatmári	Sabre	Bye	Pakmadan (IRI); L 12–15	Did not advance				
Áron Szilágyi	Sabre	Bye	Quintero (VEN); W 15–7	Abedini (IRI); W 15–7	Pakmadan (IRI); W 15–6	Bazadze (GEO); W 15–13	Samele (ITA); W 15–7	1st place, gold medalist(s)
Tamás Decsi; Csanád Gémesi*; András Szatmári; Áron Szilágyi	Team sabre	—N/a		Bye	United States; W 45–36	Italy; L 43–45	Germany; W 45–40	3rd place, bronze medalist(s)

Women

Athlete	Event	Round of 64	Round of 32	Round of 16	Quarterfinal	Semifinal	Final / BM	
Athlete	Event	Opposition Score	Opposition Score	Opposition Score	Opposition Score	Opposition Score	Opposition Score	Rank
Kata Kondricz	Foil	Bye	Volpi (ITA); L 5–15	Did not advance				
Fanni Kreiss	Foil	Bye	Batini (ITA); W 15–10	Deriglazova (ROC); L 10–15	Did not advance			
Flóra Pásztor	Foil	Mebarki (ALG); W 15–8	Thibus (FRA); L 13–15	Did not advance				
Kata Kondricz; Fanni Kreiss; Flóra Pásztor; Aida Mohamed	Team foil	—N/a			Italy; L 32–45	Classification semifinal Canada; L 33–45	Seventh place final Egypt; W 45–28	7
Renáta Katona	Sabre	Daghfous (TUN); W 15–6	Velikaya (ROC); L 4–15	Did not advance				
Anna Márton	Sabre	Bye	Maurice (ARG); W 15–12	Choi S-y (KOR); W 15–12	Dayibekova (UZB); W 15–11	Velikaya (ROC); L 8–15	Brunet (FRA); L 6–15	4
Liza Pusztai	Sabre	Bye	Chaabane (TUN); W 15–12	Qian Jr (CHN); L 10–15	Did not advance			
Renáta Katona; Anna Márton; Liza Pusztai; Sugar Battai	Team sabre	—N/a			South Korea; L 40–45	Classification semifinal Japan; L 42–45	Seventh place final China; L 30–45	8

== Gymnastics ==
=== Artistic ===
Hungary entered one artistic gymnast into the Olympic competition. Rio 2016 Olympian Zsófia Kovács booked a spot in the women's individual all-around and apparatus events, by finishing sixth out of the twenty gymnasts eligible for qualification at the 2019 World Championships in Stuttgart, Germany.

Women

Athlete	Event	Qualification						Final					
Athlete	Event	Apparatus				Total	Rank	Apparatus				Total	Rank
Athlete	Event	V	UB	BB	F	Total	Rank	V	UB	BB	F	Total	Rank
Zsófia Kovács	All-around	14.500	14.433	13.133	12.666	54.732	16 Q	14.500	14.233	12.100	12.600	53.433	14

=== Rhythmic ===
Hungary qualified one rhythmic gymnast for the individual all-around at the 2021 European Championships in Varna, Bulgaria, signifying the country's return to the sporting scene since 2000.

Athlete	Event	Qualification						Final					
Athlete	Event	Hoop	Ball	Clubs	Ribbon	Total	Rank	Hoop	Ball	Clubs	Ribbon	Total	Rank
Fanni Pigniczki	Individual	21.200	22.400	21.350	19.450	84.400	20	Did not advance					

== Handball ==
Summary

Key:
- ET – After extra time.
- P – Match decided by penalty-shootout.

Team	Event	Group stage						Quarterfinal	Semifinal	Final / BM	
Team	Event	Opposition Score	Opposition Score	Opposition Score	Opposition Score	Opposition Score	Rank	Opposition Score	Opposition Score	Opposition Score	Rank
Hungary women's	Women's tournament	France; L 29–30	Brazil; L 27–33	ROC; L 31–38	Spain; W 29–25	Sweden; W 26–23	4	Norway; L 22–26	Did not advance		7

=== Women's tournament ===
Hungary women's national handball team qualified for the Olympics by securing a top-two finish at the Győr leg of the 2020 IHF Olympic Qualification Tournament.

Team roster

The squad was announced on 2 July 2021. On 30 July, Zita Szucsánszki was replaced by Fanny Helembai, and Kinga Janurik was replaced by Melinda Szikora.

Head Coach: Gábor Elek

No.	Pos.	Name	Date of birth (age)	Height	App.	Goals	Club
2	LB	Szandra Zácsik	22 April 1990 (aged 31)	1.85 m	72	238	(Hungary) Ferencváros
6	LW	Nadine Schatzl	19 November 1993 (aged 27)	1.74 m	77	201	(Hungary) Győr
7	CB	Zita Szucsánszki	22 May 1987 (aged 34)	1.72 m	144	417	(Hungary) Ferencváros
8	CB	Anikó Kovacsics	29 August 1991 (aged 29)	1.70 m	142	310	(Hungary) Ferencváros
12	GK	Melinda Szikora	19 November 1988 (aged 32)	1.75 m	14	0	(Hungary) Siófok
14	P	Anett Kisfaludy	31 August 1990 (aged 30)	1.82 m	41	49	(Hungary) Ferencváros
16	GK	Blanka Bíró	22 September 1994 (aged 26)	1.87 m	86	2	(Hungary) Ferencváros
19	LW	Gréta Márton	3 October 1999 (aged 21)	1.73 m	29	66	(Hungary) Ferencváros
38	CB	Petra Vámos	14 September 2000 (aged 20)	1.75 m	17	23	(Hungary) Debrecen
42	RB	Katrin Klujber	21 April 1999 (aged 22)	1.70 m	31	149	(Hungary) Ferencváros
45	LB	Noémi Háfra	5 October 1998 (aged 22)	1.79 m	57	144	(Hungary) Győr
58	LP	Réka Bordás	26 August 1997 (aged 23)	1.84 m	3	7	(Hungary) Debrecen
61	GK	Kinga Janurik	6 November 1991 (aged 29)	1.76 m	39	1	(Hungary) Ferencváros
66	RW	Viktória Lukács	31 October 1995 (aged 25)	1.68 m	70	178	(Hungary) Győr
76	P	Fanny Helembai	26 December 1996 (aged 24)	1.78 m	12	16	(Hungary) Vác
87	LB	Zsuzsanna Tomori	18 June 1987 (aged 34)	1.87 m	183	454	(Hungary) Siófok
88	RB	Nikolett Kiss	23 July 1996 (aged 25)	1.82 m	21	30	(Hungary) Siófok

Group play

Pos	Team	Pld	W	D	L	GF	GA	GD	Pts	Qualification
1	Sweden	5	3	1	1	152	133	+19	7 (Note: Sweden 36–24 ROC)	Quarter-finals
2	ROC	5	3	1	1	148	149	−1	7	Quarter-finals
3	France	5	2	1	2	139	135	+4	5	Quarter-finals
4	Hungary	5	2	0	3	142	149	−7	4 (Note: Hungary 29–25 Spain)	Quarter-finals
5	Spain	5	2	0	3	135	142	−7	4	
6	Brazil	5	1	1	3	133	141	−8	3	

Source: Tokyo 2020 and IHF
Rules for classification: 1) Points; 2) Head-to-head points; 3) Head-to-head goal difference; 4) Head-to-head goals scored; 5) Goal difference; 6) Goals scored; 7) Draw.
Notes:

25 July 2021; 21:30	Hungary	29–30	France	Yoyogi National Gymnasium, Tokyo; Referees: Hansen, Madsen (DEN)
25 July 2021; 21:30	Vámos 7	(12–15)	Zaadi 10	Yoyogi National Gymnasium, Tokyo; Referees: Hansen, Madsen (DEN)
25 July 2021; 21:30	3× (suspension)	Report	1× (yellow card) 4× (suspension)	Yoyogi National Gymnasium, Tokyo; Referees: Hansen, Madsen (DEN)

27 July 2021; 11:00	Brazil	33–27	Hungary	Yoyogi National Gymnasium, Tokyo; Referees: Koo, Lee (KOR)
27 July 2021; 11:00	Belo, Vieira 7	(17–11)	Schatzl 7	Yoyogi National Gymnasium, Tokyo; Referees: Koo, Lee (KOR)
27 July 2021; 11:00	1× (yellow card) 4× (suspension)	Report	3× (suspension)	Yoyogi National Gymnasium, Tokyo; Referees: Koo, Lee (KOR)

29 July 2021; 19:30	Hungary	31–38	ROC	Yoyogi National Gymnasium, Tokyo; Referees: Brunner, Salah (SUI)
29 July 2021; 19:30	Klujber 9	(17–22)	Dmitrieva 7	Yoyogi National Gymnasium, Tokyo; Referees: Brunner, Salah (SUI)
29 July 2021; 19:30	1× (yellow card) 5× (suspension)	Report	1× (yellow card) 5× (suspension)	Yoyogi National Gymnasium, Tokyo; Referees: Brunner, Salah (SUI)

31 July 2021; 19:30	Hungary	29–25	Spain	Yoyogi National Gymnasium, Tokyo; Referees: Fonseca, Santos (POR)
31 July 2021; 19:30	Klujber, Vámos 6	(14–11)	Gutiérrez Bermejo, Martín 5	Yoyogi National Gymnasium, Tokyo; Referees: Fonseca, Santos (POR)
31 July 2021; 19:30	1× (yellow card) 5× (suspension)	Report	2× (suspension)	Yoyogi National Gymnasium, Tokyo; Referees: Fonseca, Santos (POR)

2 August 2021; 16:15	Hungary	26–23	Sweden	Yoyogi National Gymnasium, Tokyo; Referees: García, Paolantoni (ARG)
2 August 2021; 16:15	five players 4	(15–15)	Carlson, Hagman 5	Yoyogi National Gymnasium, Tokyo; Referees: García, Paolantoni (ARG)
2 August 2021; 16:15	1× (suspension) 1× (red card)	Report	5× (suspension)	Yoyogi National Gymnasium, Tokyo; Referees: García, Paolantoni (ARG)

Quarterfinal

4 August 2021; 13:15	Norway	26–22	Hungary	Yoyogi National Gymnasium, Tokyo; Referees: Bonaventura, Bonaventura (FRA)
4 August 2021; 13:15	Brattset Dale 7	(12–10)	Szöllősi-Zácsik 5	Yoyogi National Gymnasium, Tokyo; Referees: Bonaventura, Bonaventura (FRA)
4 August 2021; 13:15		Report	2× (suspension)	Yoyogi National Gymnasium, Tokyo; Referees: Bonaventura, Bonaventura (FRA)

== Judo ==
Hungary entered seven judoka (three men and four women) into the Olympic tournament based on the International Judo Federation Olympics Individual Ranking.

Men

Athlete	Event	Round of 32	Round of 16	Quarterfinals	Semifinals	Repechage	Final / BM	
Athlete	Event	Opposition Result	Opposition Result	Opposition Result	Opposition Result	Opposition Result	Opposition Result	Rank
Attila Ungvári	−81 kg	Abdelaal (EGY); L 00–10	Did not advance					
Krisztián Tóth	−90 kg	Misenga (EOR); W 10–00	Mukai (JPN); W 10–00	Trippel (GER); L 00–10	Did not advance	van 't End (NED); W 01–00	Igolnikov (ROC); W 01–00	3rd place, bronze medalist(s)
Miklós Cirjenics	–100 kg	Borodavko (LAT); W WO	Ilyasov (ROC); L 00–10	Did not advance				

Women

Athlete	Event	Round of 32	Round of 16	Quarterfinals	Semifinals	Repechage	Final / BM	
Athlete	Event	Opposition Result	Opposition Result	Opposition Result	Opposition Result	Opposition Result	Opposition Result	Rank
Éva Csernoviczki	–48 kg	Likmabam (IND); W 10–00	Tonaki (JPN); L 00–10	Did not advance				
Réka Pupp	–52 kg	Kelmendi (KOS); W 01–00	Delgado (USA); W 10–00	Kocher (SUI); L 00–10	Did not advance	Park D-s (KOR); W 01–00	Giuffrida (ITA); L 00–10	5
Hedvig Karakas	–57 kg	Kowalczyk (POL); L 00–01	Did not advance					
Szofi Özbas	–63 kg	Trajdos (GER); W 01–00	Centracchio (ITA); L 00–11	Did not advance				

== Karate ==
Hungary entered one karateka into the inaugural Olympic tournament. Gábor Hárspataki qualified directly for the men's kumite 75 kg category by finishing third in the final pool round at the 2021 World Olympic Qualification Tournament in Paris, France.

Athlete	Event	Group stage					Semifinals	Final	
Athlete	Event	Opposition Result	Opposition Result	Opposition Result	Opposition Result	Rank	Opposition Result	Opposition Result	Rank
Gábor Hárspataki	Men's −75 kg	Abdalla Abdelaziz (EGY); W 2–2	Thomas Scott (USA); L 3–8	Horuna (UKR); D 0–0	Nishimura (JPN); W 3–1	1 Q	Aghayev (AZE); L 0–7	Did not advance	3rd place, bronze medalist(s)

== Modern pentathlon ==
Hungarian athletes qualified for the following spots in the modern pentathlon at the Games. Two-time Olympian Sarolta Kovács confirmed a place in the women's event by finishing eighth among those eligible for Olympic qualification at the 2019 European Championships in Bath, England. London 2012 bronze medalist Ádám Marosi reclaimed the individual title to secure a men's place for the Hungarians at the 2021 UIPM World Championships in Cairo, Egypt, with Michelle Gulyás locking the podium with a bronze on the women's side. Róbert Kasza accepted a spare berth previously allocated by Bence Demeter as the nation's next highest-ranked modern pentathlete based on the UIPM World Rankings.

Athlete	Event	Fencing (épée one touch)				Swimming (200 m freestyle)			Riding (show jumping)			Combined: shooting/running (10 m air pistol)/(3200 m)			Total points	Final rank
Athlete	Event	RR	BR	Rank	MP points	Time	Rank	MP points	Penalties	Rank	MP points	Time	Rank	MP points	Total points	Final rank
Róbert Kasza	Men's	15–20	1	27	191	2:00.61	12	309	29	25	271	11:58.88	33	582	1353	26
Ádám Marosi	Men's	20–15	0	10	220	1:59.50	9	311	3	4	297	11:07.43	11	633	1461	6
Michelle Gulyás	Women's	20–15	0	=6	220	2:07.48	2	296	57	26	243	12:14.76	7	566	1325	12
Sarolta Kovács	Women's	20–15	1	=6	221	2:07.71	4	295	7	9	293	12:21.42	11	559	1368	3rd place, bronze medalist(s)

== Rowing ==
Hungary qualified one boat in the men's single sculls for the Games by winning the bronze medal and securing the second of three berths available at the 2021 FISA European Olympic Qualification Regatta in Varese, Italy.

Athlete	Event	Heats		Repechage		Quarterfinals		Semifinals		Final	
Athlete	Event	Time	Rank	Time	Rank	Time	Rank	Time	Rank	Time	Rank
Bendegúz Pétervári-Molnár	Men's single sculls	7:04.42	2 QF	Bye		7:24.63	2 SA/B	6:59.08	5 FB	5:09.29	10

Qualification Legend: FA=Final A (medal); FB=Final B (non-medal); FC=Final C (non-medal); FD=Final D (non-medal); FE=Final E (non-medal); FF=Final F (non-medal); SA/B=Semifinals A/B; SC/D=Semifinals C/D; SE/F=Semifinals E/F; QF=Quarterfinals; R=Repechage

== Sailing ==
Hungarian sailors qualified one boat in each of the following classes through the 2018 Sailing World Championships, the class-associated Worlds, and the continental regattas.

Athlete	Event	Race													Net points	Final rank
Athlete	Event	1	2	3	4	5	6	7	8	9	10	11	12	M*	Net points	Final rank
Benjámin Vadnai	Men's Laser	7	~~21~~	9	15	16	18	17	21	21	25	—N/a		EL	145	18
Zsombor Berecz	Men's Finn	2	2	~~9~~	4	6	7	3	5	4	4	—N/a		1	39	2nd place, silver medalist(s)
Sára Cholnoky	Women's RS:X	~~27~~	26	27	21	25	15	24	19	24	23	20	21	EL	246	25
Mária Érdi	Women's Laser Radial	19	18	16	16	2	17	14	11	15	~~25~~	—N/a		EL	128	13

M = Medal race; EL = Eliminated – did not advance into the medal race

== Shooting ==
Hungarian shooters achieved quota places for the following events by virtue of their best finishes at the 2018 ISSF World Championships, the 2019 ISSF World Cup series, European Championships or Games, and European Qualifying Tournament, as long as they obtained a minimum qualifying score (MQS) by May 31, 2020. The shooting squad was named on June 14, 2021, with 2018 world silver medalist and current world record holder István Péni earning his second consecutive trip to the Games as the lone returning Olympian.

Athlete	Event	Qualification		Semifinal		Final	
Athlete	Event	Points	Rank	Points	Rank	Points	Rank
Zalán Pekler	Men's 10 m air rifle	621.1	39	—N/a		Did not advance	
Zalán Pekler	Men's 50 m rifle 3 positions	1169	18	—N/a		Did not advance	
István Péni	Men's 10 m air rifle	629.4	7 Q	—N/a		186.5	5
István Péni	Men's 50 m rifle 3 positions	1173	10	—N/a		Did not advance	
Veronika Major	Women's 10 m air pistol	566	34	—N/a		Did not advance	
Veronika Major	Women's 25 m pistol	572	35	—N/a		Did not advance	
Eszter Mészáros	Women's 10 m air rifle	625.3	20	—N/a		Did not advance	
Eszter Mészáros	Women's 50 m rifle 3 positions	1161-48x	26	—N/a		Did not advance	
István Péni; Eszter Mészáros	Mixed 10 m air rifle team	627.9	8 Q	414.6	7	Did not advance	

== Swimming ==
Hungarian swimmers further achieved qualifying standards in the following events (up to a maximum of 2 swimmers in each event at the Olympic Qualifying Time (OQT), and potentially 1 at the Olympic Selection Time (OST)):

Thirty-three swimmers (22 men and 11 women) were named to the Hungarian roster for the Olympics at the end of the qualifying window, with six-time medalist László Cseh, freestylers Zsuzsanna Jakabos and Evelyn Verrasztó, and two-time defending individual medley champion Katinka Hosszú racing in the pool at their fifth straight Games.

Men

Athlete	Event	Heat		Semifinal		Final	
Athlete	Event	Time	Rank	Time	Rank	Time	Rank
Péter Bernek	400 m individual medley	4:12.38	13	—N/a		Did not advance	
Richárd Bohus	100 m backstroke	DSQ		Did not advance			
László Cseh	200 m individual medley	1:57.51	10 Q	1:57.64	8 Q	1:57.68	7
Gergely Gyurta	1500 m freestyle	15:01.85	15	—N/a		Did not advance	
Ákos Kalmár	800 m freestyle	7:55.85	22	—N/a		Did not advance	
Ákos Kalmár	1500 m freestyle	15:17.02	22	—N/a		Did not advance	
Tamás Kenderesi	200 m butterfly	1.55.18	8 Q	1:55.17	5 Q	1:54.52	4
Hubert Kós	200 m individual medley	1:58.47	20	Did not advance			
Dominik Kozma	200 m freestyle	1:48.87	30	Did not advance			
Maxim Lobanovskij	50 m freestyle	22.25	=26	Did not advance			
Kristóf Milák	100 m butterfly	50.62	2 Q	50.31	2 Q	49.68 EU	2nd place, silver medalist(s)
Kristóf Milák	200 m butterfly	1:53.58	1 Q	1:52.22	1 Q	1:51.25 OR	1st place, gold medalist(s)
Nándor Németh	100 m freestyle	48.11	9 Q	47.81 NR	7 Q	48.10	8
Nándor Németh	200 m freestyle	1:46.19	12 Q	1:47.20	15	Did not advance	
Kristóf Rasovszky	10 km open water	—N/a				1:48:59.0	2nd place, silver medalist(s)
Szebasztián Szabó	100 m freestyle	48.51	20	Did not advance			
Szebasztián Szabó	100 m butterfly	51.67	=14 Q	51.89	14	Did not advance	
Ádám Telegdy	100 m backstroke	54.42	29	Did not advance			
Ádám Telegdy	200 m backstroke	1:57.70	14 Q	1:56.19	4 Q	1:56.15	5
Dávid Verrasztó	400 m individual medley	4:09.80	4 Q	—N/a		4:10:59	=4
Gábor Zombori	400 m freestyle	3:47.99	18	—N/a		Did not advance	
Richárd Bohus; Kristóf Milák; Nándor Németh; Szebasztián Szabó	4 × 100 m freestyle relay	3:12.73	6 Q	—N/a		3:11.06 NR	5
Balázs Holló; Dominik Kozma; Richárd Márton; Gábor Zombori	4 × 200 m freestyle relay	DSQ		—N/a		Did not advance	
Richárd Bohus; Péter Holoda; Hubert Kós; Tamás Takács	4 × 100 m medley relay	3:34.91	13	—N/a		Did not advance	

Women

Athlete	Event	Heat		Semifinal		Final	
Athlete	Event	Time	Rank	Time	Rank	Time	Rank
Eszter Békési	200 m breaststroke	2:26.89	25	Did not advance			
Katalin Burián	100 m backstroke	1:00.07	=18	Did not advance			
Katalin Burián	200 m backstroke	2:09.10	=8 Q	2:09.65	10	Did not advance	
Katinka Hosszú	200 m backstroke	2:12.84	20	Did not advance			
Katinka Hosszú	200 m butterfly	DNS		Did not advance			
Katinka Hosszú	200 m individual medley	2:09.70	2 Q	2:10.22	7 Q	2:12.38	7
Katinka Hosszú	400 m individual medley	4:36.01	7 Q	—N/a		4:35.98	5
Boglárka Kapás	200 m butterfly	2:08.58	5 Q	2:06.59	3 Q	2:06.53	4
Ajna Késely	400 m freestyle	4:05.34	10	—N/a		Did not advance	
Ajna Késely	800 m freestyle	8:26.20	13	—N/a		Did not advance	
Ajna Késely	1500 m freestyle	15:59.80	9	—N/a		Did not advance	
Viktória Mihályvári-Farkas	1500 m freestyle	16:02.26	12	—N/a		Did not advance	
Viktória Mihályvári-Farkas	400 m individual medley	4:35.99	6 Q	—N/a		4:37.75	6
Anna Olasz	10 km open water	—N/a				1:59:34.8	4
Dalma Sebestyén	200 m individual medley	2:12.42	17	Did not advance			
Dalma Sebestyén	100 m butterfly	59.79	27	Did not advance			
Zsuzsanna Jakabos; Boglárka Kapás; Ajna Késely; Laura Veres; Evelyn Verrasztó^{[a]}	4 × 200 m freestyle relay	7:56.16	8 Q	—N/a		7:56.62	7

Mixed

Athlete	Event	Heat		Final	
Athlete	Event	Time	Rank	Time	Rank
Fanni Gyurinovics; Petra Halmai; Benedek Kovács; Richárd Márton	4 × 100 m medley relay	3:47.15	15	Did not advance	

^{a} Swimmers who participated in the heats only.

== Table tennis ==
Hungary entered five athletes into the table tennis competition at the Games. For the first time in history, the women's team secured a berth by advancing to the quarterfinal round of the 2020 World Olympic Qualification Event in Gondomar, Portugal, permitting a maximum of two starters to compete in the women's singles tournament. Meanwhile, Bence Majoros scored a second-match final triumph to book one of the four available places in the men's singles at the 2021 ITTF World Qualification Tournament in Doha, Qatar. Moreover, the last open berth in the inaugural mixed doubles was awarded to the Hungarian table tennis players, as the next highest-ranked pair vying for qualification in the ITTF World Rankings of June 1, 2021.

Athlete	Event	Preliminary	Round 1	Round 2	Round 3	Round of 16	Quarterfinals	Semifinals	Final / BM	
Athlete	Event	Opposition Result	Opposition Result	Opposition Result	Opposition Result	Opposition Result	Opposition Result	Opposition Result	Opposition Result	Rank
Bence Majoros	Men's singles	Bye	Bouriah (ALG); W 4–0	Groth (DEN); L 1–4	Did not advance					
Dóra Madarász	Women's singles	Bye	Edem (NGR); L 1–4	Did not advance						
Georgina Póta	Women's singles	Bye		Moret (SUI); L 1–4	Did not advance					
Dóra Madarász; Mária Fazekas; Szandra Pergel	Women's team	—N/a				Japan; L 0–3	Did not advance			
Ádám Szudi; Szandra Pergel	Mixed doubles	—N/a				Wong C T / Doo H K (HKG); L 0–4	Did not advance			

== Taekwondo ==
For the first time since 2000, Hungary entered one athlete into the taekwondo competition at the Games. American-born Omar Salim secured a spot in the men's flyweight category (58 kg) with a top two finish at the 2021 European Qualification Tournament in Sofia, Bulgaria.

Athlete	Event	Round of 16	Quarterfinals	Semifinals	Repechage	Final / BM	
Athlete	Event	Opposition Result	Opposition Result	Opposition Result	Opposition Result	Opposition Result	Rank
Omar Salim	Men's −58 kg	Dell'Aquila (ITA); L 13–26	Did not advance		Sawekwiharee (THA); W 43–22 PTG	Jang J (KOR); L 16–46 PTG	5

== Tennis ==
Hungary named a team of three players on 10 June 2021. Tímea Babos withdrew ahead of the tournament, with Márton Fucsovics joining her before his initial scheduled match against Poland's Hubert Hurkacz because of a right shoulder injury.

Athlete	Event	Round of 64	Round of 32	Round of 16	Quarterfinal	Semifinal	Final / BM	
Athlete	Event	Opposition Result	Opposition Result	Opposition Result	Opposition Result	Opposition Result	Opposition Result	Rank
Márton Fucsovics	Men's singles	Withdrew due to right shoulder injury						

== Triathlon ==
Hungary confirmed four quota places (two per gender) in the triathlon events for the rescheduled Tokyo, after finishing among the top seven nations vying for qualification in the ITU Mixed Relay Olympic Rankings.

Individual

Athlete	Event	Time						Rank
Athlete	Event	Swim (1.5 km)	Trans 1	Bike (40 km)	Trans 2	Run (10 km)	Total	Rank
Bence Bicsák	Men's	17:55	0:42	56:26	0:29	30:24	1:45:56	7
Tamás Tóth	Men's	18:07	0:40	56:20	0:33	32:39	1:48:19	29
Zsanett Bragmayer	Women's	19:19	0:42	1:03:07	0:34	36:18	2:00:00	12
Zsófia Kovács	Women's	20:30	0:42	Lapped				

Relay

Athlete	Event	Time						Rank
Athlete	Event	Swim (300 m)	Trans 1	Bike (7 km)	Trans 2	Run (2 km)	Total group	Rank
Zsanett Bragmayer	Mixed relay	3:53	0:39	10:33	0:30	6:29	22:04	—N/a
Bence Bicsák	Mixed relay	4:07	0:38	9:53	0:28	5:31	20:37	—N/a
Zsófia Kovács	Mixed relay	4:31	0:38	10:53	0:30	6:34	23:06	—N/a
Tamás Tóth	Mixed relay	4:12	0:44	9:52	0:28	5:40	20:56	—N/a
Total	Mixed relay	—N/a					1:26:43	11

== Water polo ==
Summary

Key:
- FT – After full time.
- P – Match decided by penalty-shootout.

Team	Event	Group stage						Quarterfinal	Semifinal	Final / BM	
Team	Event	Opposition Score	Opposition Score	Opposition Score	Opposition Score	Opposition Score	Rank	Opposition Score	Opposition Score	Opposition Score	Rank
Hungary men's	Men's tournament	Greece; L 9–10	Japan; W 16–11	South Africa; W 23–1	United States; W 11–8	Italy; D 5–5	3	Croatia; W 15–11	Greece; L 6–9	Spain; W 9–5	3rd place, bronze medalist(s)
Hungary women's	Women's tournament	Russia; D 10–10	United States; W 10–9	Japan; W 17–13	China; L 9–11	—N/a	2	Netherlands; W 14–11	Spain; L 6–8	Russia; W 11–9	3rd place, bronze medalist(s)

=== Men's tournament ===
Hungary men's national water polo team qualified for the Olympics by advancing to the final match and securing an outright berth at the 2020 European Championships in Budapest.

Team roster

Hungary's final squad was announced on 29 June 2021.

Head coach: Tamás Märcz

No.	Player	Pos.	L/R	Height	Weight	Date of birth (age)	Apps	OG/ Goals	Club	Ref
1	Viktor Nagy	GK	R	1.98 m (6 ft 6 in)	96 kg (212 lb)	24 July 1984 (aged 36)	229	2/0	(Hungary) Szolnoki	
2	Dániel Angyal	CB	R	2.03 m (6 ft 8 in)	108 kg (238 lb)	29 March 1992 (aged 29)	106	0/0	(Hungary) Szolnoki	
3	Krisztián Manhercz	D	R	1.91 m (6 ft 3 in)	91 kg (201 lb)	6 February 1997 (aged 24)	142	1/8	(Hungary) OSC Budapest	
4	Gergő Zalánki	D	L	1.92 m (6 ft 4 in)	91 kg (201 lb)	26 February 1995 (aged 26)	109	1/7	(Hungary) Ferencvárosi	
5	Márton Vámos	D	L	2.02 m (6 ft 8 in)	105 kg (231 lb)	24 June 1992 (aged 29)	241	1/14	(Hungary) Ferencvárosi	
6	Norbert Hosnyánszky	CB	R	1.96 m (6 ft 5 in)	101 kg (223 lb)	4 March 1984 (aged 37)	317	3/24	(Hungary) Budapesti Honvéd	
7	Mátyás Pásztor	D	R			20 February 1987 (aged 34)	22	0/0	(Hungary) Budapesti Vasutas	
8	Szilárd Jansik	CB	R	1.95 m (6 ft 5 in)	96 kg (212 lb)	6 April 1994 (aged 27)	52	0/0	(Hungary) Ferencvárosi	
9	Balázs Erdélyi	D	R	1.96 m (6 ft 5 in)	94 kg (207 lb)	16 February 1990 (aged 31)	167	1/10	(Hungary) OSC Budapest	
10	Dénes Varga (C)	D	R	1.93 m (6 ft 4 in)	96 kg (212 lb)	29 March 1987 (aged 34)	307	3/34	(Hungary) Ferencvárosi	
11	Tamás Mezei	CF	L	1.97 m (6 ft 6 in)	108 kg (238 lb)	14 September 1990 (aged 30)	90	0/0	(Hungary) Ferencvárosi	
12	Balázs Hárai	CF	R	2.02 m (6 ft 8 in)	110 kg (243 lb)	5 April 1987 (aged 34)	250	2/14	(Hungary) OSC Budapest	
13	Soma Vogel	GK	R	1.98 m (6 ft 6 in)	85 kg (187 lb)	7 July 1997 (aged 24)	29	0/0	(Hungary) Ferencvárosi	
Average				1.97 m (6 ft 6 in)	98 kg (216 lb)	30 years, 289 days	159			

Note: Age as of 23 July 2021
Source: Hungary Men | Tokyo 2020 Olympics Archived 2021-07-22 at the Wayback Machine

Group play

Pos	Team	Pld	W	D	L	GF	GA	GD	Pts	Qualification
1	Greece	5	4	1	0	68	34	+34	9	Quarterfinals
2	Italy	5	3	2	0	60	32	+28	8	Quarterfinals
3	Hungary	5	3	1	1	64	35	+29	7	Quarterfinals
4	United States	5	2	0	3	59	53	+6	4	Quarterfinals
5	Japan (H)	5	1	0	4	65	66	−1	2	
6	South Africa	5	0	0	5	20	116	−96	0	

Source: Tokyo 2020 and FINA
Rules for classification: 1) Points; 2) Head-to-head points; 3) Head-to-head goal difference; 4) Head-to-head goals scored; 5) Goal difference.
(H) Hosts

25 July 2021; 11:30 v	Report	Hungary	9–10	Greece	Tokyo Tatsumi International Swimming Center; Referees: Michiel Zwart (NED), Vojin Putniković (SRB)
25 July 2021; 11:30 v	Report	Score by quarters: 3–2, 3–4, 2–3, 1–1			Tokyo Tatsumi International Swimming Center; Referees: Michiel Zwart (NED), Vojin Putniković (SRB)
25 July 2021; 11:30 v	Report	Erdélyi, Varga 3	Goals	Fountoulis 3	Tokyo Tatsumi International Swimming Center; Referees: Michiel Zwart (NED), Vojin Putniković (SRB)

27 July 2021; 18:20 v	Report	Japan	11–16	Hungary	Tokyo Tatsumi International Swimming Center; Referees: Michiel Zwart (NED), Nenad Periš (CRO)
27 July 2021; 18:20 v	Report	Score by quarters: 3–4, 5–4, 2–5, 1–3			Tokyo Tatsumi International Swimming Center; Referees: Michiel Zwart (NED), Nenad Periš (CRO)
27 July 2021; 18:20 v	Report	Inaba, Okawa 3	Goals	Zalánki 4	Tokyo Tatsumi International Swimming Center; Referees: Michiel Zwart (NED), Nenad Periš (CRO)

29 July 2021; 10:00 v	Report	Hungary	23–1	South Africa	Tokyo Tatsumi International Swimming Center; Referees: Daniel Daners (URU), Germán Moller (ARG)
29 July 2021; 10:00 v	Report	Score by quarters: 4–0, 5–0, 8–0, 6–1			Tokyo Tatsumi International Swimming Center; Referees: Daniel Daners (URU), Germán Moller (ARG)
29 July 2021; 10:00 v	Report	Manhercz 5	Goals	Rodda 1	Tokyo Tatsumi International Swimming Center; Referees: Daniel Daners (URU), Germán Moller (ARG)

31 July 2021; 14:00 v	Report	United States	8–11	Hungary	Tokyo Tatsumi International Swimming Center; Referees: Xevi Buch (ESP), Arkadiy Voevodin (RUS)
31 July 2021; 14:00 v	Report	Score by quarters: 1–2, 3–3, 0–3, 4–3			Tokyo Tatsumi International Swimming Center; Referees: Xevi Buch (ESP), Arkadiy Voevodin (RUS)
31 July 2021; 14:00 v	Report	Bowen, Hallock 2	Goals	Manhercz 3	Tokyo Tatsumi International Swimming Center; Referees: Xevi Buch (ESP), Arkadiy Voevodin (RUS)

2 August 2021; 10:00 v	Report	Hungary	5–5	Italy	Tokyo Tatsumi International Swimming Center; Referees: Xevi Buch (ESP), Arkadiy Voevodin (RUS)
2 August 2021; 10:00 v	Report	Score by quarters: 2–1, 2–1, 1–1, 0–2			Tokyo Tatsumi International Swimming Center; Referees: Xevi Buch (ESP), Arkadiy Voevodin (RUS)
2 August 2021; 10:00 v	Report	Varga 3	Goals	Figlioli 2	Tokyo Tatsumi International Swimming Center; Referees: Xevi Buch (ESP), Arkadiy Voevodin (RUS)

Quarterfinal

4 August 2021; 19:50 v	Report	Hungary	15–11	Croatia	Tokyo Tatsumi International Swimming Center; Referees: Sébastien Dervieux (FRA), Frank Ohme (GER)
4 August 2021; 19:50 v	Report	Score by quarters: 2–3, 5–2, 4–3, 4–3			Tokyo Tatsumi International Swimming Center; Referees: Sébastien Dervieux (FRA), Frank Ohme (GER)
4 August 2021; 19:50 v	Report	Manhercz 7	Goals	Bukić 4	Tokyo Tatsumi International Swimming Center; Referees: Sébastien Dervieux (FRA), Frank Ohme (GER)

Semifinal

6 August 2021; 15:30 v	Report	Greece	9–6	Hungary	Tokyo Tatsumi International Swimming Center; Referees: Michael Goldenberg (USA), Arkadiy Voevodin (RUS)
6 August 2021; 15:30 v	Report	Score by quarters: 2–1, 1–1, 2–2, 4–2			Tokyo Tatsumi International Swimming Center; Referees: Michael Goldenberg (USA), Arkadiy Voevodin (RUS)
6 August 2021; 15:30 v	Report	Argyropoulos 4	Goals	Manhercz 2	Tokyo Tatsumi International Swimming Center; Referees: Michael Goldenberg (USA), Arkadiy Voevodin (RUS)

Bronze medal game

8 August 2021; 13:40 v	Report	Hungary	9–5	Spain	Tokyo Tatsumi International Swimming Center; Referees: Arkadiy Voevodin (RUS), Georgios Stavridis (GRE)
8 August 2021; 13:40 v	Report	Score by quarters: 3–3, 2–2, 1–0, 3–0			Tokyo Tatsumi International Swimming Center; Referees: Arkadiy Voevodin (RUS), Georgios Stavridis (GRE)
8 August 2021; 13:40 v	Report	Vámos 2	Goals	Munárriz 2	Tokyo Tatsumi International Swimming Center; Referees: Arkadiy Voevodin (RUS), Georgios Stavridis (GRE)

=== Women's tournament ===
Hungary women's national water polo team qualified for the Olympics by advancing to the final match and securing an outright berth at the 2020 World Olympic Qualification Tournament in Trieste, Italy.

Team roster

Hungary's final squad was announced on 29 June 2021.

Head coach: Attila Bíró

No.	Player	Pos.	L/R	Height	Weight	Date of birth (age)	Apps	OG/ Goals	Club	Ref
1	Edina Gangl	GK	R	1.81 m (5 ft 11 in)	64 kg (141 lb)	25 June 1990 (aged 31)	167	2/0	(Hungary) UVSE	
2	Dorottya Szilágyi	D	R	1.82 m (6 ft 0 in)	68 kg (150 lb)	10 November 1996 (aged 24)	107	0/0	(Hungary) Dunaújvárosi	
3	Vanda Vályi	D	R	1.81 m (5 ft 11 in)	64 kg (141 lb)	13 August 1999 (aged 21)	70	0/0	(Hungary) Ferencvárosi	
4	Gréta Gurisatti	D	R	1.76 m (5 ft 9 in)	75 kg (165 lb)	14 May 1996 (aged 25)	108	0/0	(Hungary) Dunaújvárosi	
5	Gabriella Szűcs	CB	R	1.83 m (6 ft 0 in)	73 kg (161 lb)	7 March 1988 (aged 33)	286	2/16	(Hungary) UVSE	
6	Rebecca Parkes	CF	R	1.82 m (6 ft 0 in)	83 kg (183 lb)	16 August 1994 (aged 26)	82	0/0	(Hungary) UVSE	
7	Anna Illés	D	R	1.80 m (5 ft 11 in)	70 kg (154 lb)	21 February 1994 (aged 27)	215	1/2	(Hungary) Ferencvárosi	
8	Rita Keszthelyi (C)	D	R	1.78 m (5 ft 10 in)	67 kg (148 lb)	10 December 1991 (aged 29)	291	2/24	(Hungary) UVSE	
9	Dóra Leimeter	D	L	1.75 m (5 ft 9 in)	78 kg (172 lb)	8 May 1996 (aged 25)	78	0/0	(Hungary) Budapesti Vasutas	
10	Anikó Gyöngyössy	CF	R	1.85 m (6 ft 1 in)	98 kg (216 lb)	21 May 1990 (aged 31)	105	0/0	(Hungary) Budapesti Vasutas	
11	Natasa Rybanska	CB	R	1.90 m (6 ft 3 in)	86 kg (190 lb)	10 April 2000 (aged 21)	55	0/0	(Hungary) UVSE	
12	Krisztina Garda	D	R	1.70 m (5 ft 7 in)	84 kg (185 lb)	16 July 1994 (aged 27)	138	1/1	(Hungary) Dunaújvárosi	
13	Alda Magyari	GK	R	1.90 m (6 ft 3 in)	80 kg (176 lb)	19 October 2000 (aged 20)	25	0/0	(Hungary) Dunaújvárosi	
Average				1.81 m (5 ft 11 in)	76 kg (168 lb)	26 years, 216 days	133			

Note: Age as of 23 July 2021
Source: Hungary Women | Tokyo 2020 Olympics Archived 2021-07-22 at the Wayback Machine

Group play

Pos	Team	Pld	W	D	L	GF	GA	GD	Pts	Qualification
1	United States	4	3	0	1	64	26	+38	6	Quarterfinals
2	Hungary	4	2	1	1	46	43	+3	5 (Note: ROC10–10 Hungary)	Quarterfinals
3	ROC	4	2	1	1	53	61	−8	5	Quarterfinals
4	China	4	2	0	2	51	50	+1	4	Quarterfinals
5	Japan (H)	4	0	0	4	44	78	−34	0	

Source: Tokyo 2020 and FINA
Rules for classification: 1) Points; 2) Head-to-head points; 3) Head-to-head goal difference; 4) Head-to-head goals scored; 5) Goal difference.
(H) Hosts
Notes:

26 July 2021; 15:30 v	Report	ROC	10–10	Hungary	Tokyo Tatsumi International Swimming Center; Referees: Sébastien Dervieux (FRA), Xevi Buch (ESP)
26 July 2021; 15:30 v	Report	Score by quarters: 1–2, 3–5, 3–1, 3–2			Tokyo Tatsumi International Swimming Center; Referees: Sébastien Dervieux (FRA), Xevi Buch (ESP)
26 July 2021; 15:30 v	Report	Prokofyeva 4	Goals	Leimeter, Szilágyi 2	Tokyo Tatsumi International Swimming Center; Referees: Sébastien Dervieux (FRA), Xevi Buch (ESP)

28 July 2021; 14:00 v	Report	Hungary	10–9	United States	Tokyo Tatsumi International Swimming Center; Referees: Nenad Periš (CRO), Xevi Buch (ESP)
28 July 2021; 14:00 v	Report	Score by quarters: 2–2, 3–3, 1–3, 4–1			Tokyo Tatsumi International Swimming Center; Referees: Nenad Periš (CRO), Xevi Buch (ESP)
28 July 2021; 14:00 v	Report	Parkes 3	Goals	Musselman 3	Tokyo Tatsumi International Swimming Center; Referees: Nenad Periš (CRO), Xevi Buch (ESP)

30 July 2021; 18:20 v	Report	Japan	13–17	Hungary	Tokyo Tatsumi International Swimming Center; Referees: Adrian Alexandrescu (ROU), Vojin Putniković (SRB)
30 July 2021; 18:20 v	Report	Score by quarters: 4–3, 3–4, 3–5, 3–5			Tokyo Tatsumi International Swimming Center; Referees: Adrian Alexandrescu (ROU), Vojin Putniković (SRB)
30 July 2021; 18:20 v	Report	Arima, Inaba 4	Goals	Parkes 6	Tokyo Tatsumi International Swimming Center; Referees: Adrian Alexandrescu (ROU), Vojin Putniković (SRB)

1 August 2021; 14:00 v	Report	Hungary	9–11	China	Tokyo Tatsumi International Swimming Center; Referees: Viktor Salnichenko (KAZ), Frank Ohme (GER)
1 August 2021; 14:00 v	Report	Score by quarters: 1–4, 1–3, 2–1, 5–3			Tokyo Tatsumi International Swimming Center; Referees: Viktor Salnichenko (KAZ), Frank Ohme (GER)
1 August 2021; 14:00 v	Report	Gurisatti 4	Goals	four players 2	Tokyo Tatsumi International Swimming Center; Referees: Viktor Salnichenko (KAZ), Frank Ohme (GER)

Quarterfinal

3 August 2021; 18:20 v	Report	Netherlands	11–14	Hungary	Tokyo Tatsumi International Swimming Center; Referees: Nenad Periš (CRO), Alessandro Severo (ITA)
3 August 2021; 18:20 v	Report	Score by quarters: 3–4, 4–4, 2–2, 2–4			Tokyo Tatsumi International Swimming Center; Referees: Nenad Periš (CRO), Alessandro Severo (ITA)
3 August 2021; 18:20 v	Report	Van der Kraats 4	Goals	Leimeter 4	Tokyo Tatsumi International Swimming Center; Referees: Nenad Periš (CRO), Alessandro Severo (ITA)

Semifinal

5 August 2021; 19:50 v	Report	Spain	8–6	Hungary	Tokyo Tatsumi International Swimming Center; Referees: Nenad Periš (CRO), Vojin Putniković (SRB)
5 August 2021; 19:50 v	Report	Score by quarters: 2–0, 3–2, 3–2, 0–2			Tokyo Tatsumi International Swimming Center; Referees: Nenad Periš (CRO), Vojin Putniković (SRB)
5 August 2021; 19:50 v	Report	A. Espar 3	Goals	Szilágyi 3	Tokyo Tatsumi International Swimming Center; Referees: Nenad Periš (CRO), Vojin Putniković (SRB)

Bronze medal game

7 August 2021; 13:40 v	Report	Hungary	11–9	ROC	Tokyo Tatsumi International Swimming Center; Referees: Georgios Stavridis (GRE), Frank Ohme (GER)
7 August 2021; 13:40 v	Report	Score by quarters: 2–2, 5–3, 0–3, 4–1			Tokyo Tatsumi International Swimming Center; Referees: Georgios Stavridis (GRE), Frank Ohme (GER)
7 August 2021; 13:40 v	Report	Vályi 3	Goals	three players 2	Tokyo Tatsumi International Swimming Center; Referees: Georgios Stavridis (GRE), Frank Ohme (GER)

== Weightlifting ==
Hungary entered one male weightlifter into the Olympic competition. Two-time Olympian Péter Nagy accepted a spare berth unused by Africa as the next highest-ranked weightlifter vying for qualification in the men's +109 kg category based on the IWF Absolute World Rankings.

Athlete	Event	Snatch		Clean & jerk		Total	Rank
Athlete	Event	Result	Rank	Result	Rank	Total	Rank
Péter Nagy	Men's +109 kg	178	8	218	7	396	7

== Wrestling ==
Hungary qualified six wrestlers for each of the following classes into the Olympic competition. Four of them finished among the top six to book Olympic spots in the men's freestyle 65 kg, men's Greco-Roman (77 and 87 kg), and women's freestyle 62 kg wrestling at the 2019 World Championships, while an additional license was awarded to the Hungarian wrestler, who progressed to the top two finals of the men's Greco-Roman 67 kg at the 2021 European Olympic Qualification Tournament in Budapest. Another Hungarian wrestler claimed one of the remaining slots each in the men's Greco-Roman 97 kg, respectively, to complete the nation's roster at the 2021 World Qualification Tournament in Sofia, Bulgaria.

Key:

- VT (ranking points: 5–0 or 0–5) – Victory by fall.
- VB (ranking points: 5–0 or 0–5) – Victory by injury (VF for forfeit, VA for withdrawal or disqualification)
- PP (ranking points: 3–1 or 1–3) – Decision by points – the loser with technical points.
- PO (ranking points: 3–0 or 0–3) – Decision by points – the loser without technical points.
- ST (ranking points: 4–0 or 0–4) – Great superiority – the loser without technical points and a margin of victory of at least 8 (Greco-Roman) or 10 (freestyle) points.
- SP (ranking points: 4–1 or 1–4) – Technical superiority – the loser with technical points and a margin of victory of at least 8 (Greco-Roman) or 10 (freestyle) points.

Freestyle

Athlete	Event	Round of 16	Quarterfinal	Semifinal	Repechage	Final / BM	
Athlete	Event	Opposition Result	Opposition Result	Opposition Result	Opposition Result	Opposition Result	Rank
Iszmail Muszukajev	Men's −65 kg	Destribats (ARG); W 3–1 ^{PP}	Otoguro (JPN); L 1–3 ^{PP}	Did not advance	Tömör-Ochir (MGL); W 3–1 ^{PP}	Rashidov (ROC); L 0–3 ^{PO}	5
Marianna Sastin	Women's −62 kg	Incze (ROU); L 1–3 ^{PP}	Did not advance				13

Greco-Roman

Athlete	Event	Round of 16	Quarterfinal	Semifinal	Repechage	Final / BM	
Athlete	Event	Opposition Result	Opposition Result	Opposition Result	Opposition Result	Opposition Result	Rank
Bálint Korpási	Men's −67 kg	Aslanyan (ARM); L 1–3 ^{PP}	Did not advance				12
Tamás Lőrincz	Men's −77 kg	Ikram (MAR); W 5–0 ^{VA}	Yabiku (JPN); W 3–1 ^{PP}	Geraei (IRI); W 3–1 ^{PP}	Bye	Makhmudov (KGZ); W 3–1 ^{PP}	1st place, gold medalist(s)
Viktor Lőrincz	Men's −87 kg	Azisbekov (KGZ); W 3–1 ^{PP}	Kudla (GER); W 3–1 ^{PP}	Metwally (EGY); W 3–1 ^{PP}	Bye	Beleniuk (UKR); L 1–3 ^{PP}	2nd place, silver medalist(s)
Alex Szőke	Men's −97 kg	Omarov (CZE); W 3–1 ^{PP}	Evloev (ROC); L 1–3 ^{PP}	Did not advance	Melia (GEO); W 3–1 ^{PP}	Michalik (POL); L 0–4 ^{ST}	5
