= Rudolph Berking-Williams =

Samoan sprint canoeist

- Rudolph Berking-Williams

Personal information
- Nationality: Samoan
- Born: August 30, 1978 (age 47)
- Education: De La Salle College, Mangere East
- Height: 1.86 m (6 ft 1 in)
- Weight: 86 kg (190 lb)

Sport
- Sport: Canoeing
- Event: Canoe sprint
- Updated on 21 July 2012

Rudolph Berking-Williams (born August 30, 1978) is a Samoan sprint canoer.

He represented Samoa at the 2008 Summer Olympics in Beijing in the K-1 500 m and K-1 1000 m events.

At the 2012 Summer Olympics he competed in the C-1 1000 m and C-1 200 m events.

At the 2020 Summer Olympics, he competed in the Men's K-1 200 m, Men's C-1 1000 m, and Men's K-2 1000 m

== Career ==
He is of German and Samoan descent and currently lives in Auckland, New Zealand.

He also competed at the 2007 World Championships..
