= Murray Stewart =

Australian kayaker (born 1986)

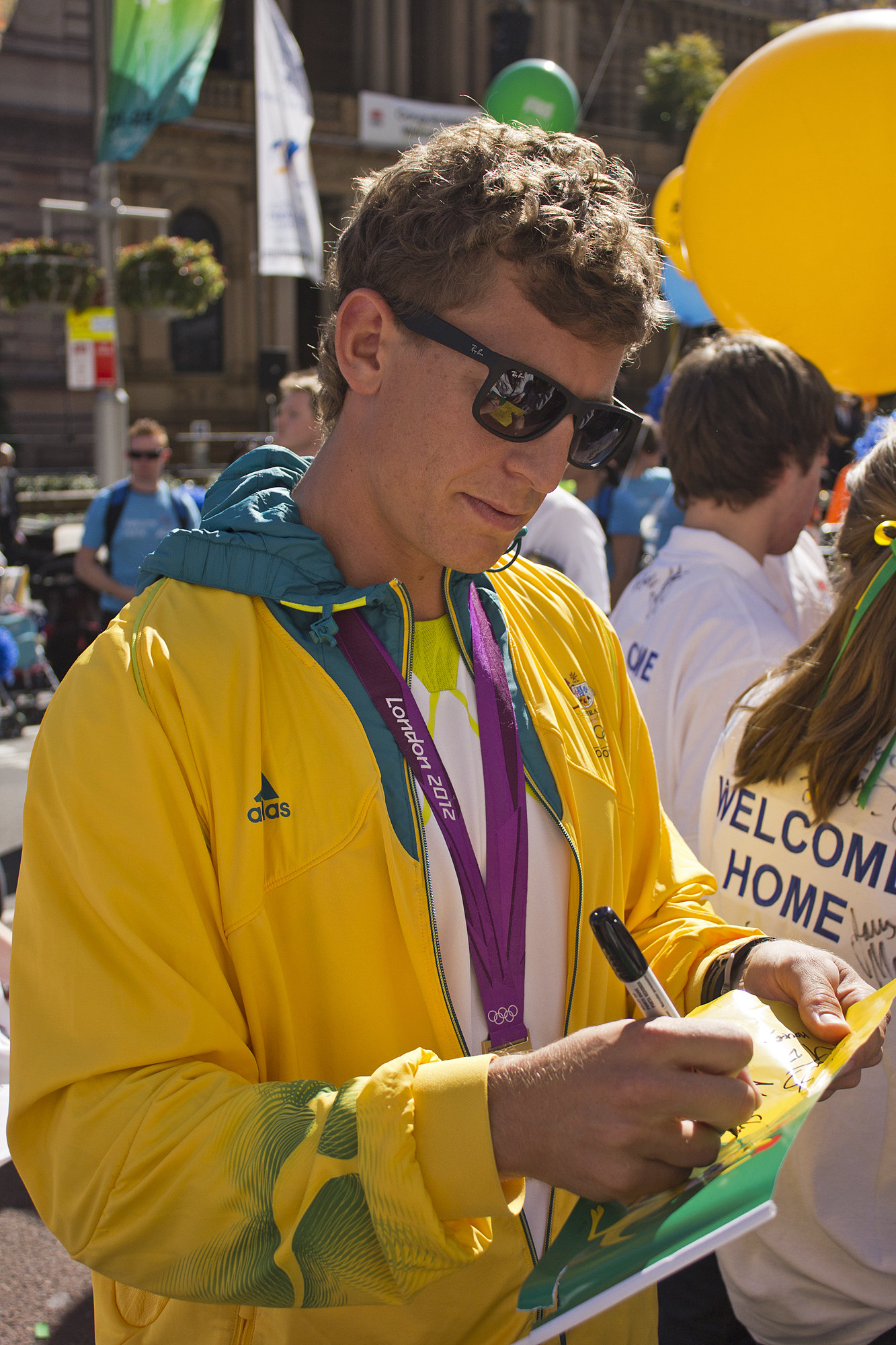
- Stewart at the Welcome Home parade in Sydney

Medal record

Men's canoe sprint

Representing Australia

Olympic Games
Gold medal – first place	2012 London	K-4 1000 m

World Championships
Gold medal – first place	2017 Račice	K-4 1000 m
Silver medal – second place	2011 Szeged	K-4 1000 m
Bronze medal – third place	2013 Duisburg	K–4 1000 m

Murray Scott Stewart OAM (born 2 July 1986 in Durban, South Africa) is an Australian kayaker. Stewart qualified for the 2020 Tokyo Olympics and teamed up with Riley Fitzsimmons, Lachlan Tame and Jordan Wood in the Men's K-4 500m sprint. The team did well in the heats clocking 1:22.662, came second in the semi-final, but could not repeat their best time coming in 6th in the final behind the eventual winner, Germany,

== Early years ==
Stewart grew up in South Africa and excelled in athletics: swimming and water polo. When he was 14 years of age, Stewart immigrated to Australia with his family.

Stewart learned to surf ski once he settled in Australia. His father had been a champion sprint, slalom, and surf paddler, so the transition was a natural one. He was a talented junior and won national medals while studying for his high school exams.

Stewart started flat water kayaking in 2005, and in 2006, was selected for the Australian under 23 team. He won the K1 1000 metres at an event in Poland. He had ambitions of competing in the Beijing 2008 Olympics, but a ruptured appendix, followed by a spinal fracture in late 2007, disrupted his preparations.

== Achievements ==
Stewart won the single ski events at the 2008 Lifesaving World Championships and 2009 Australian Surf Life Saving Championships.

Stewart then had a number of top performances at the Olympic selection events. He came in 1st place in the K1, K2 and K4 1000m events at the Oceania Championships, before backing up at the Australian Championships to win the same 3 events.

He was also a member of Australia's gold medal-winning Kayak Four (K4) 1000m team at the London Olympics 2012.

Stewart is a graduate of The University of Sydney and participated in their Elite Athlete Program.
