= Stefan Vekić =

Serbian canoeist

Personal information
- Nationality: Serbian
- Born: 26 April 1995 (age 31) Novi Sad, Serbia, FR Yugoslavia

Sport
- Country: Serbia
- Sport: Canoe sprint
- Event: Kayaking
Medal record
World Championships
| Silver medal – second place | 2018 Montemor-o-Velho | K-2 500 m |

Stefan Vekić (born 26 April 1995) is a Serbian sprint canoeist.

He participated at the 2018 ICF Canoe Sprint World Championships.
