= Tamás Grossmann =

German canoeist

Personal information
- Nationality: German
- Born: 16 March 1997 (age 29) Budapest, Hungary

Sport
- Country: Germany
- Sport: Canoe sprint
- Event: Kayaking
Medal record
World Championships
Gold medal – first place	2018 Montemor-o-Velho	K-4 1000 m
Gold medal – first place	2022 Dartmouth	K-2 1000 m
Silver medal – second place	2022 Dartmouth	K-1 5000 m
Bronze medal – third place	2017 Račice	K-4 1000 m
European Championships
Gold medal – first place	2022 Munich	K-2 1000 m

Tamás Grossmann (former Tamás Gecső) (born 16 March 1997) is a retired German sprint canoeist.

He participated in the 2018 ICF Canoe Sprint World Championships and got his first international gold medal in the K-4 1000 m. He also competed at the 2017 World Championships and got a bronze medal in the K-4 1000 m. In 2022 he became a two-time world champion as he was able to get a second gold medal in his career in the K-2 1000 m in Dartmouth Canada. He also got a silver medal in the K-1 5000 m at the same event. He finished his ´22 season with a gold medal in Munich at the European Championships in the K-2 1000 m.

He is a 15-time German and a 14-time Hungarian national champion.

He retired in 2024 and is currently an officer in the German Air Force.
