= Benjámin Ceiner =

Hungarian sprint kayaker

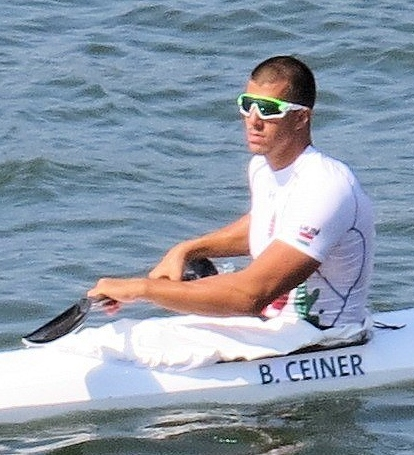
- Ceiner at the 2016 Olympics

Personal information
- Nationality: Hungarian
- Born: 24 April 1992 (age 34) Budapest, Hungary
- Education: Semmelweis University
- Height: 1.97 m (6 ft 6 in)
- Weight: 94 kg (207 lb)

Sport
- Country: Hungary
- Sport: Canoe sprint
- Club: Budapesti Honved Sportegyesulet
- Coached by: Matyus Zsolt; István Kiss
Medal record
Men's canoe sprint
Representing Hungary
World Championships
Silver medal – second place	2017 Račice	K-4 1000 m

Benjámin Ceiner (born 24 April 1992) is a Hungarian sprint kayaker. He competed in the K-2 1000 and K-4 1000 m events at the 2016 Summer Olympics and placed 7th and 11th, respectively.
