= Lukas Reuschenbach =

German canoeist (born 1994)

Personal information
- Born: 16 January 1994 (age 32) Oberhausen, Germany

Sport
- Country: Germany
- Sport: Sprint kayak
- Event: K-4 1000 m
- Club: TC Sterkrade
Medal record
Men's canoe sprint
Representing Germany
World Championships
Gold medal – first place	2018 Montemor-o-Velho	K-4 1000 m
Gold medal – first place	2019 Szeged	K-4 1000 m
Bronze medal – third place	2017 Račice	K-4 1000 m

Lukas Reuschenbach (born 16 January 1994) is a German sprint canoeist.

He participated at the 2018 ICF Canoe Sprint World Championships.
