= Riley Fitzsimmons =

Australian canoeist (born 1996)

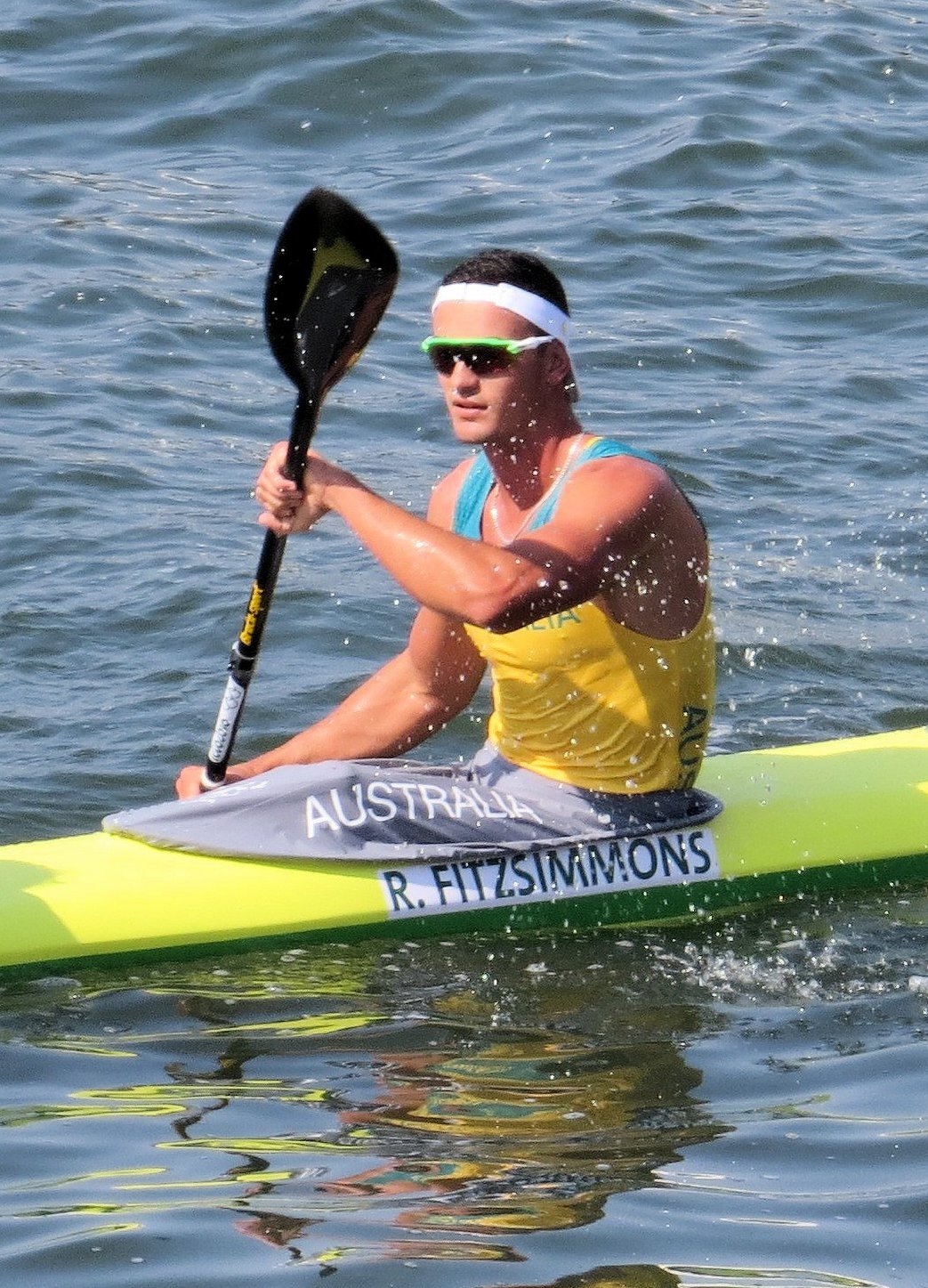
- Fitzsimmons at the 2016 Summer Olympics

Personal information
- Born: 27 July 1996 (age 30) Avoca Beach, New South Wales, Australia

Sport
- Country: Australia
- Sport: Canoe sprint
- Events: K-2 1000 m, K-4 500 m, K-4 1000 m
- Club: Gold Coast
Medal record
Men's canoe sprint
Representing Australia
Olympic Games
Silver medal – second place	2024 Paris	K-4 500 m
World Championships
Gold medal – first place	2017 Račice	K-4 1000 m
Silver medal – second place	2026 Poznań	K-4 500 m

Riley Fitzsimmons (born 27 July 1996) is an Australian sprint canoeist.

He competed in the men's K-4 1000 metres at the 2016 Summer Olympics in Rio de Janeiro, and in both the men's K-2 1000 metres and men's K-4 500 metres at the 2020 Summer Olympics in Tokyo. He teamed up with Murray Stewart, Lachlan Tame and Jordan Wood in the Men's K-4 500m sprint. The team did well in the heats clocking 1:22.662, came second in the semi-final but couldn't repeat their best time in the final coming sixth behind the eventual winner, Germany.

Fitzsimmons began kayaking as a mean of improving his surf ski performance. He has cited Australian Olympic bronze medalist Lachlan Tame as his greatest influence.
