= Luca Beccaro =

Italian canoeist

Personal information
- Nationality: Italian
- Born: 10 July 1997 (age 27)

Sport
- Sport: Canoe sprint

Luca Beccaro (born 10 July 1997) is an Italian canoeist. He competed in the men's K-2 1000 metres event at the 2020 Summer Olympics.
