= Kornél Béke =

Hungarian canoeist

Personal information
- Nationality: Hungarian
- Born: 2 December 1998 (age 26)

Sport
- Sport: Canoe sprint

Kornél Béke (born 2 December 1998) is a Hungarian canoeist. He competed in the men's K-2 1000 metres event at the 2020 Summer Olympics.
