= Dániel Pauman =

Hungarian canoeist

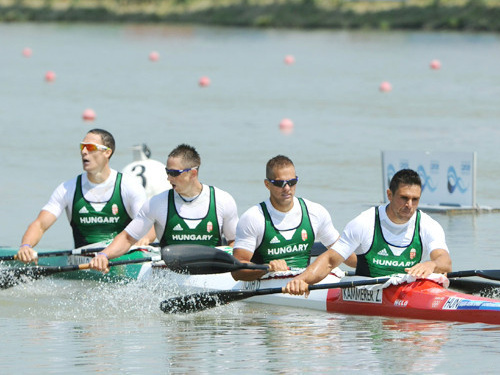
- (right to left) Kammerer, Tóth, Kulifai, Paumann in 2013

Personal information
- Nationality: Hungarian
- Born: 13 August 1986 (age 39) Vác, Hungary

Sport
- Sport: Canoe sprint
- Club: MTK (2006–2012); Vasas SC (2012–)
- Coached by: Katalin Fábiánné Rozsnyói
Medal record
Men's canoe sprint
Representing Hungary
Olympic Games
Silver medal – second place	2012 London	K-4 1000 m
World Championships
Silver medal – second place	2015 Milan	K-4 1000 m
Silver medal – second place	2017 Račice	K-4 1000 m
Bronze medal – third place	2014 Moscow	K-4 1000 m
European Championships
Bronze medal – third place	2013 Montemor-o-Velho	K-4 1000 m

Dániel Pauman (born 13 August 1986) is a Hungarian canoer. He won a silver medal at the 2012 Summer Olympics in the K-4 1000 m event (with Zoltán Kammerer, Dávid Tóth and Tamás Kulifai). In June 2015, he competed in the inaugural European Games, for Hungary in canoe sprint, more specifically, men's K-4 1000m, again with Zoltan Kammerer, Dávid Tóth, and Tamás Kulifai. They earned a gold medal.

== Awards and honours ==
=== Orders and special awards ===
- Order of Merit of Hungary – Knight's Cross (2012)
