= Rubén Millán =

Spanish kayaker

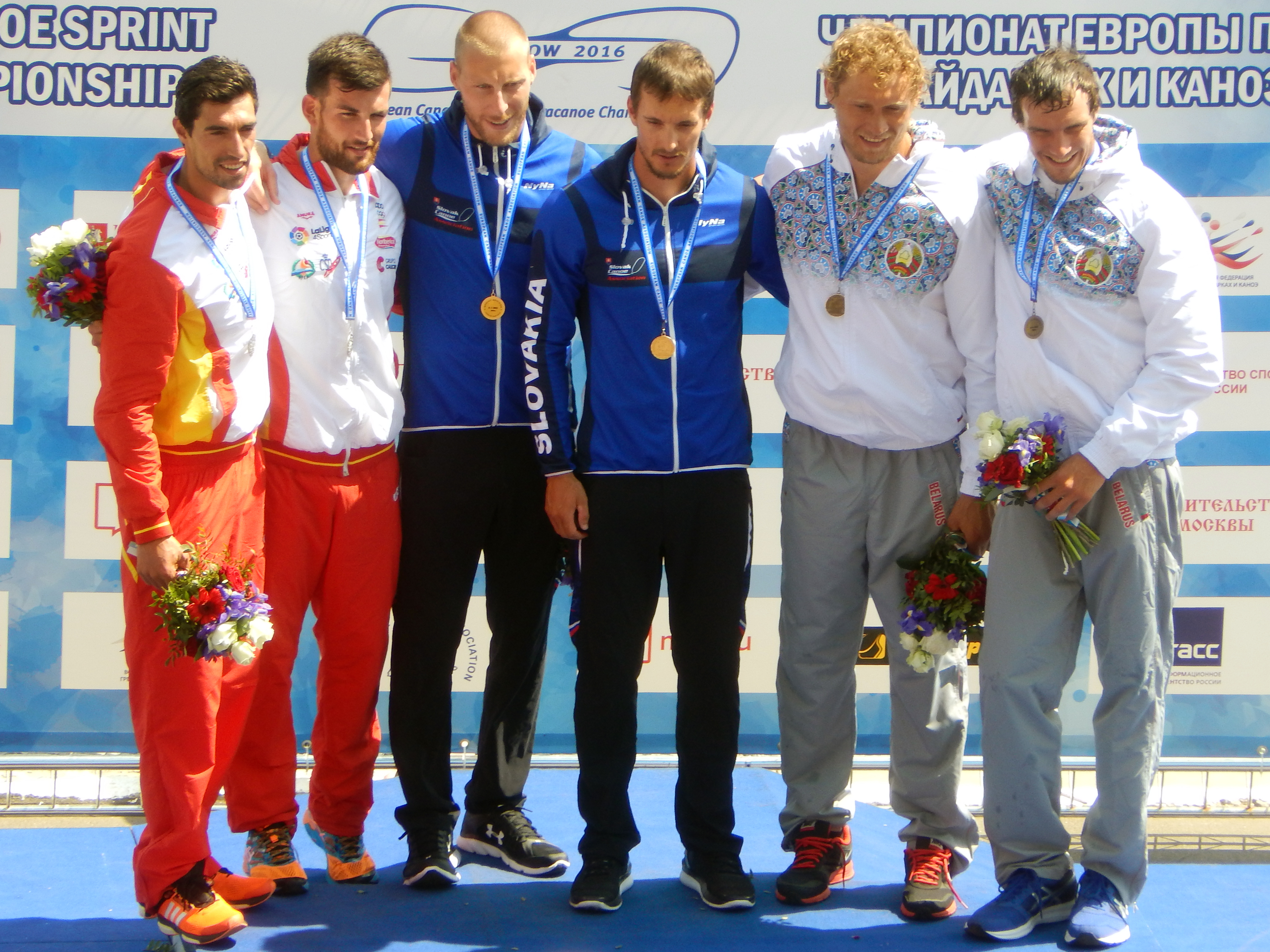

Personal information
- Full name: Rubén Millán Rodríguez
- Nationality: Spanish
- Born: 16 February 1992 (age 34) Tomiño, Spain

Sport
- Country: Spain
- Sport: Canoe sprint
- Event: Kayaking
Medal record
World Championships
Bronze medal – third place	2018 Montemor-o-Velho	K-4 1000 m
European Championships
Silver medal – second place	2016 Moscow	K2 500 m
Bronze medal – third place	2018 Belgrade	K4 1000 m

Rubén Millán Rodríguez (born 16 February 1992) is a Spanish sprint canoeist.

He participated at the 2018 ICF Canoe Sprint World Championships.
