= Tamás Kulifai =

Hungarian canoeist (born 1989)

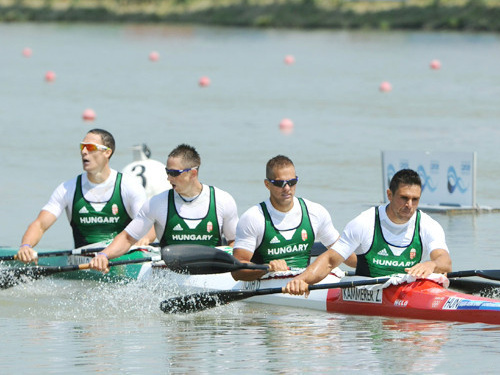
- (right to left) Kammerer, Tóth, Kulifai, Paumann in 2013

Personal information
- Nationality: Hungarian
- Born: 4 May 1989 (age 37) Budapest, Hungary
- Height: 1.87 m (6 ft 2 in)
- Weight: 82 kg (181 lb)

Sport
- Sport: Sprint kayak
- Club: Gödi SE (−2008); MTK (2009–2012); Vasas SC (2012–)
- Coached by: Katalin Fábiánné Rozsnyói
Medal record
Men's sprint kayak
Representing Hungary
Olympic Games
Silver medal – second place	2012 London	K-4 1000 m
World Championships
Gold medal – first place	2011 Szeged	K-2 500 m
Silver medal – second place	2015 Milan	K-4 1000 m
Bronze medal – third place	2014 Moscow	K-4 1000 m
Bronze medal – third place	2021 Copenhagen	K-2 1000 m
Bronze medal – third place	2022 Dartmouth	K-2 1000 m
European Championships
Silver medal – second place	2021 Poznań	K-4 1000 m
Bronze medal – third place	2013 Montemor-o-Velho	K-4 1000 m

Tamás Kulifai (born 4 May 1989) is a Hungarian sprint canoeist. He won a silver medal at the 2012 Summer Olympics in the K-4 1000 m event, with Zoltan Kammerer, David Toth and Daniel Pauman. In June 2015, he competed for Hungary at the inaugural European Games, again in the Men's K-4 1000m sprint canoe, with the same team. The team earned a gold medal.

== Awards and honours ==
=== Orders and special awards ===
- Order of Merit of Hungary – Knight's Cross (2012)
