= Max Brown (canoeist) =

New Zealand canoeist

Personal information
- Full name: Max McDonald Brown
- Born: 9 April 1995 (age 31) Whanganui, New Zealand
- Height: 181 cm (5 ft 11 in)

Sport
- Club: Whanganui Kayak Club
- Coached by: Tim Brabants (2021); Craig Mustard (2024)

Max Brown (born 9 April 1995) is a New Zealand canoeist.

Originally from Whanganui, Brown studied at Waikato University. He also taught music to school students in Cambridge.

In 2013 he made his international debut at the Sydney Youth Olympic Festival before competing at the World Junior Championships in Canada in the K4 1000m, missing a place in the A Final by one spot.

Brown paddling alongside Kurtis Imrie finished eighth in the A Final of the K2 1000m at the World Cup in Poznan in 2021. Coached by Tim Brabants, Imrie and Brown also qualified a New Zealand K2 1000m boat at the 2020 Oceania Canoe Sprint Championships in Sydney. Imrie finished runner up to Brown in the NZCT New Zealand Canoe Sprint Championships at Lake Karapiro in May 2021 in the K1 1000m.
