= Zoltán Kammerer =

Hungarian canoeist (born 1978)

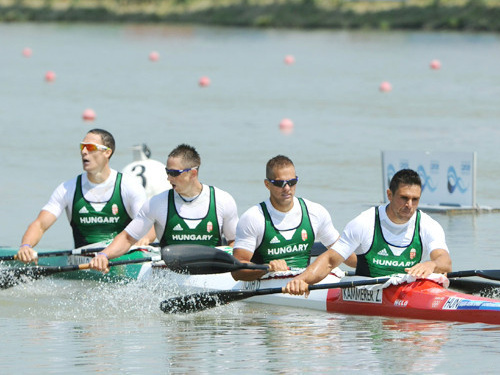
- Kammerer (first R to L) in 2013

Personal information
- Nickname: Kamera
- Nationality: Hungarian
- Born: 10 March 1978 (age 48) Vác, Hungary
- Height: 1.82 m (6 ft 0 in)
- Weight: 86 kg (190 lb)

Sport
- Sport: Canoe sprint
- Club: Gödi SE (–1993); Újpesti TE (1994–1996); Győri VSE (1997–)
Medal record
Men's canoe sprint
Representing Hungary
Event	1st	2nd	3rd
Olympic Games	3	1	0
World Championships	3	6	6
European Championships	7	7	2
European Games	2	0	0
Total	15	14	8
Olympic Games
Gold medal – first place	2000 Sydney	K-2 500 m
Gold medal – first place	2000 Sydney	K-4 1000 m
Gold medal – first place	2004 Athens	K-4 1000 m
Silver medal – second place	2012 London	K-4 1000 m
World Championships
Gold medal – first place	1997 Dartmouth	K-4 500 m
Gold medal – first place	1999 Milan	K-4 1000 m
Gold medal – first place	2006 Szeged	K-2 1000 m
Silver medal – second place	2001 Poznań	K-4 1000 m
Silver medal – second place	2003 Gainesville	K-4 1000 m
Silver medal – second place	2009 Dartmouth	K-2 500 m
Silver medal – second place	2010 Poznań	K-2 1000 m
Silver medal – second place	2015 Milan	K-4 1000 m
Silver medal – second place	2017 Račice	K-4 1000 m
Bronze medal – third place	1999 Milan	K-4 500 m
Bronze medal – third place	2002 Seville	K-2 500 m
Bronze medal – third place	2006 Szeged	K-2 500 m
Bronze medal – third place	2007 Duisburg	K-2 500 m
Bronze medal – third place	2007 Duisburg	K-2 1000 m
Bronze medal – third place	2014 Moscow	K-4 1000 m
European Championships
Gold medal – first place	2004 Poznań	K-4 1000 m
Gold medal – first place	2006 Račice	K-2 1000 m
Gold medal – first place	2007 Pontevedra	K-2 1000 m
Silver medal – second place	1999 Zagreb	K-2 500 m
Silver medal – second place	1999 Zagreb	K-2 1000 m
Silver medal – second place	2000 Poznań	K-4 1000 m
Silver medal – second place	2008 Milan	K-4 500 m
Silver medal – second place	2009 Brandenburg	K-2 500 m
Silver medal – second place	2010 Trasona	K-2 1000 m
Silver medal – second place	2006 Račice	K-2 500 m
Bronze medal – third place	2005 Poznań	K-2 500 m
Bronze medal – third place	2013 Montemor-o-Velho	K-4 1000 m

Zoltán Kammerer (born 10 March 1978) is a Hungarian sprint canoeist who has competed since the mid-1990s. Competing in five Summer Olympics, he won three gold medals (K-2 500 m: 2000, K-4 1000 m: 2000, 2004) and a silver medal (K-4 1000 m: 2012).

== Career ==
Kammerer also twelve medals at the ICF Canoe Sprint World Championships with three golds (K-2 1000 m: 2006, K-4 500 m: 1997, K-4 1000 m: 1999), four silvers (K-2 500 m: 2009, K-2 1000 m: 2010, K-4 1000 m: 2001, 2003), and five bronzes (K-2 500 m: 2002, 2006, 2007; K-2 1000 m: 2007, K-4 500 m: 1999).

A member of the Győr club, he is 182 cm (6'0) tall and weighs 86 kg (190 lbs).

At the 2008 Summer Olympics, Kammerer carried the Hungarian flag at the opening ceremonies. This was initially planned to be given to his fellow canoeist György Kolonics who had died a month before the Games.

In June 2015, he competed in the inaugural European Games, for Hungary in canoe sprint, more specifically, Men's K-2 1000m with Tamas Szalai and K-4 1000m with Dávid Tóth, Tamás Kulifai, and Dániel Pauman. He earned gold medals in both areas.

== Awards ==
- Masterly youth athlete: 1995
- Hungarian kayaker of the Year (3): 2000, 2006, 2010
- Honorary Citizen of Göd (2003)
- Honorary Citizen of Győr (2004)

Orders and special awards

- Order of Merit of the Republic of Hungary – Officer's Cross (2000)
- Order of Merit of the Republic of Hungary – Commander's Cross (2004)
- Order of Merit of Hungary – Commander's Cross with Star (2012)
