= Gábor Jakubík =

Slovak sprint canoeist

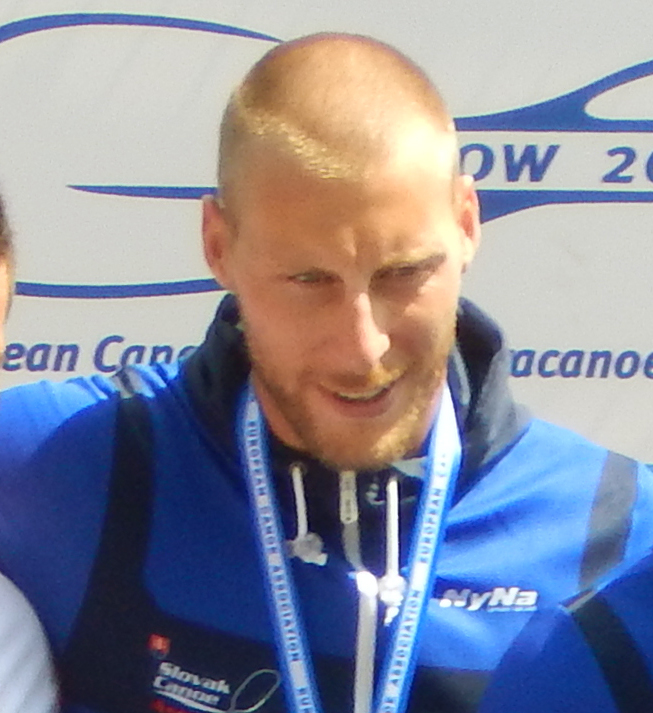

Personal information
- Nationality: Slovak
- Born: 16 April 1990 (age 36) Komárno, Slovakia

Sport
- Country: Slovakia
- Sport: Sprint kayak
- Event: K-4 1000 m
Medal record
Men's canoe sprint
Representing Slovakia
World Championships
Silver medal – second place	2018 Montemor-o-Velho	K-4 1000 m
Bronze medal – third place	2019 Szeged	K-4 1000 m
European Championships
Gold medal – first place	2016 Moscow	K-2 500 m
Silver medal – second place	2014 Brandenburg	K-4 1000 m
Silver medal – second place	2018 Belgrade	K-4 1000 m

Gábor Jakubík (born 16 April 1990) is a Slovak sprint canoeist.

He participated at the 2018 ICF Canoe Sprint World Championships.
