= Jordan Wood =

Australian canoeist (born 1994)

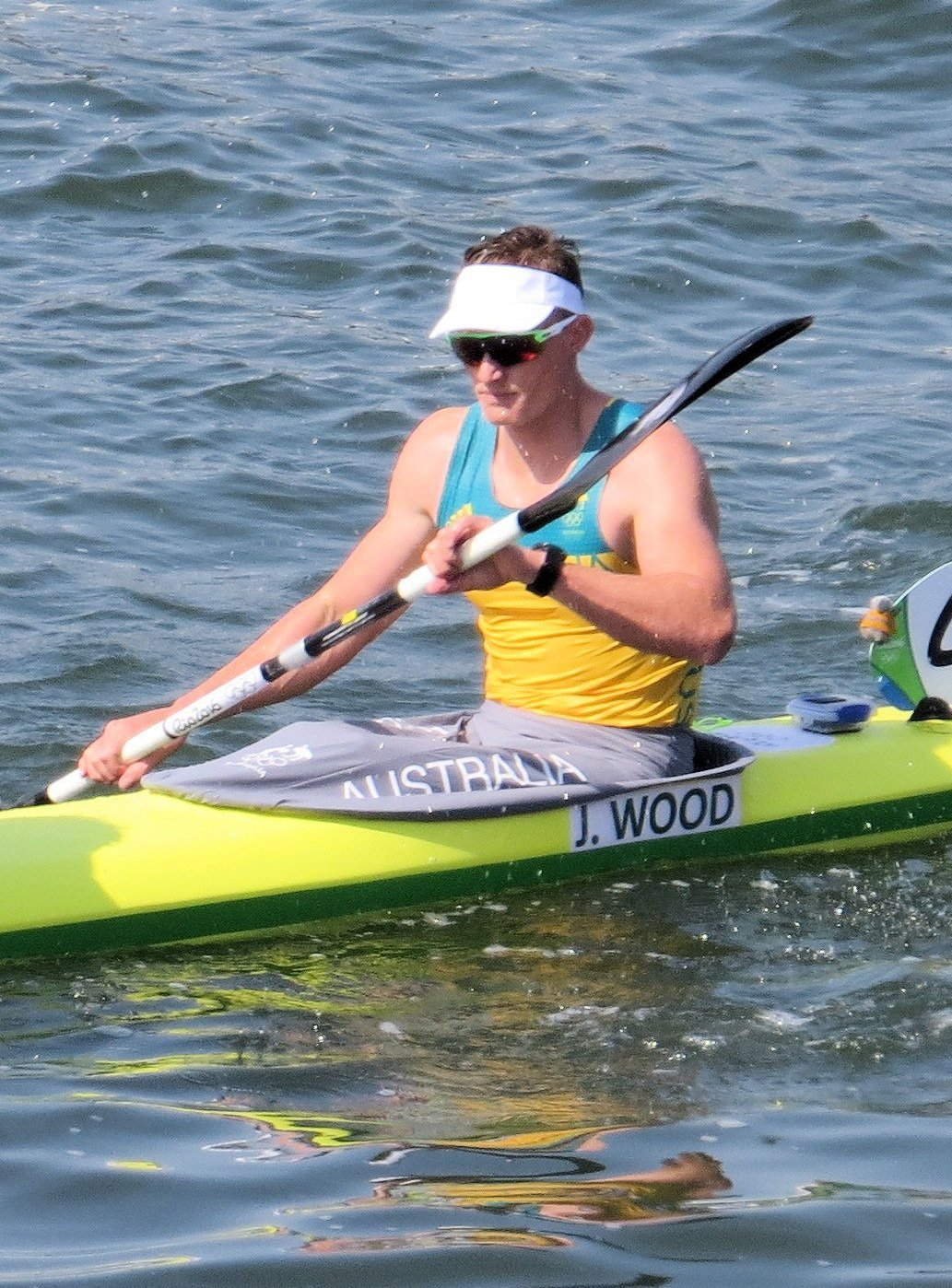

Personal information
- Nationality: Australian
- Born: 1 August 1994 (age 31)

Sport
- Country: Australia
- Sport: Canoe sprint
Medal record
Men's canoe sprint
Representing Australia
World Championships
Gold medal – first place	2017 Račice	K-4 1000 m

Jordan Wood (born 1 August 1994) is an Australian canoeist. He competed in the men's K-2 200 metres and men's K-4 1000 metres events at the 2016 Summer Olympics.

Wood teamed up with Lachlan Tame, Murray Stewart and Riley Fitzsimmons in the men's K-4 500m at the 2020 Tokyo Olympics. The team came second in their heat with a time of 1.22:662. In their semi-final they paddled quite a bit slower but still managed to come second and qualify for the final. They couldn't keep up their good form and came sixth in the final, nearly 3 seconds behind the eventual winner, Germany.

== Early years ==
Wood grew up on the Gold Coast, Queensland and therefore was always surrounded by water. In his junior years he preferred racing mountain bikes but his downhill mountain biking injuries took its toll and started kayaking seriously at the age of 15.

His parents were Olympic kayakers. His late father Steve Wood won K4 1000 metres bronze at Barcelona 1992. Wood's mother Anna Wood initially competed for The Netherlands but then went onto win the K2 500m bronze for Australia at the 1996 Atlanta Olympics. She was then placed sixth at the 2000 Sydney Olympics. Anna Wood is now the coach of the Australian women's canoe sprint team.

== Achievements ==
At the 2013 Australian Youth Olympic Festival Wood won gold in the K2 1000 and silver in the K1 1000 and K2 200

In 2015, he partnered with Riley Fitzsimmons and won K2 1000 gold at the Under 23 World Championships.

The pair then won the first Grand Prix regatta of the 2016 season, defeating 2015 World Championships silver medalists and Olympians Ken Wallace and Lachlan Tame.

Wood teamed with Jacob Clear, Riley Fitzsimmons and Ken Wallace in the K4 1000 at the Rio 2016 Olympics. The crew went down fighting in the final to finish fourth behind Germany, Slovakia and the Czech Republic.
