= Dávid Tóth =

Hungarian canoer (born 1985)

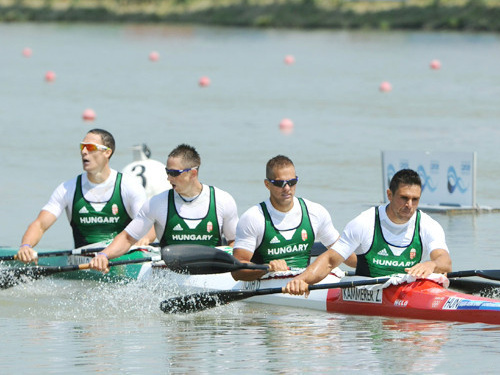
- Tóth (second R to L) in 2013

Personal information
- Nationality: Hungarian
- Born: 21 February 1985 (age 41) Székesfehérvár, Hungary

Sport
- Sport: Canoe sprint
- Club: MTK (–2012); Vasas SC (2012–)
- Coached by: Katalin Fábiánné Rozsnyói
Medal record
Men's canoe sprint
Representing Hungary
Olympic Games
Silver medal – second place	2012 London	K-4 1000 m
World Championships
Gold medal – first place	2011 Szeged	K-2 500 m
Silver medal – second place	2015 Milan	K-4 1000 m
Silver medal – second place	2017 Račice	K-4 1000 m
Bronze medal – third place	2014 Moscow	K-4 1000 m
European Championships
Bronze medal – third place	2013 Montemor-o-Velho	K-4 1000 m

Dávid Tóth (born 21 February 1985) is a Hungarian canoer. He has won a silver medal at the 2012 Summer Olympics in the K-4 1000 m event (with Zoltan Kammerer, Tamás Kulifai, and Dániel Pauman). In June 2015, he competed in the inaugural European Games, for Hungary in canoe sprint, more specifically, Men's K-4 1000m again with Zoltan Kammerer, Tamás Kulifai, and Dániel Pauman.

In 2020, he participated in the Hungarian version of Dancing with the Stars, where he finished in fifth place. He was partnered with professional ballroom dancer Laura Lissak.

== Awards and honours ==
=== Orders and special awards ===
- Order of Merit of Hungary – Knight's Cross (2012)
