= Marek Krajčovič =

Slovak canoeist (born 1992)

Marek Krajčovič (born 3 August 1992 in Bratislava) is a Slovak sprint canoeist. At the 2012 Summer Olympics, he competed in the Men's K-1 1000 metres.
