= Katalin Rozsnyói =

Hungarian sprint canoer (born 1942)

Olympic medal record

Women's canoe sprint
Silver medal – second place	1968 Mexico City	K-2 500 m

Katalin Rozsnyói (sometimes shown as Katalin Rozsnyói-Sági; born November 20, 1942) is a Hungarian sprint canoer who competed in the late 1960s. She won a silver medal in the K-2 500 m event at the 1968 Summer Olympics in Mexico City.

As a canoeing coach, Katalin Fábiánné Rozsnyói became one of the best Hungarian coaches. In 2000s she was named the Coach of the Year in Hungary six times in a row by the members of the Hungarian Sports Journalists' Association; this series was broken only in 2007 by the tennis coach Zoltan Kuharszky. Rozsynyoi was awarded the International Olympic Committee Coaches Lifetime achievement award in October 2018.

== External sources ==
- Sports-reference.com profile
