= Lukáš Trefil =

Czech canoeist

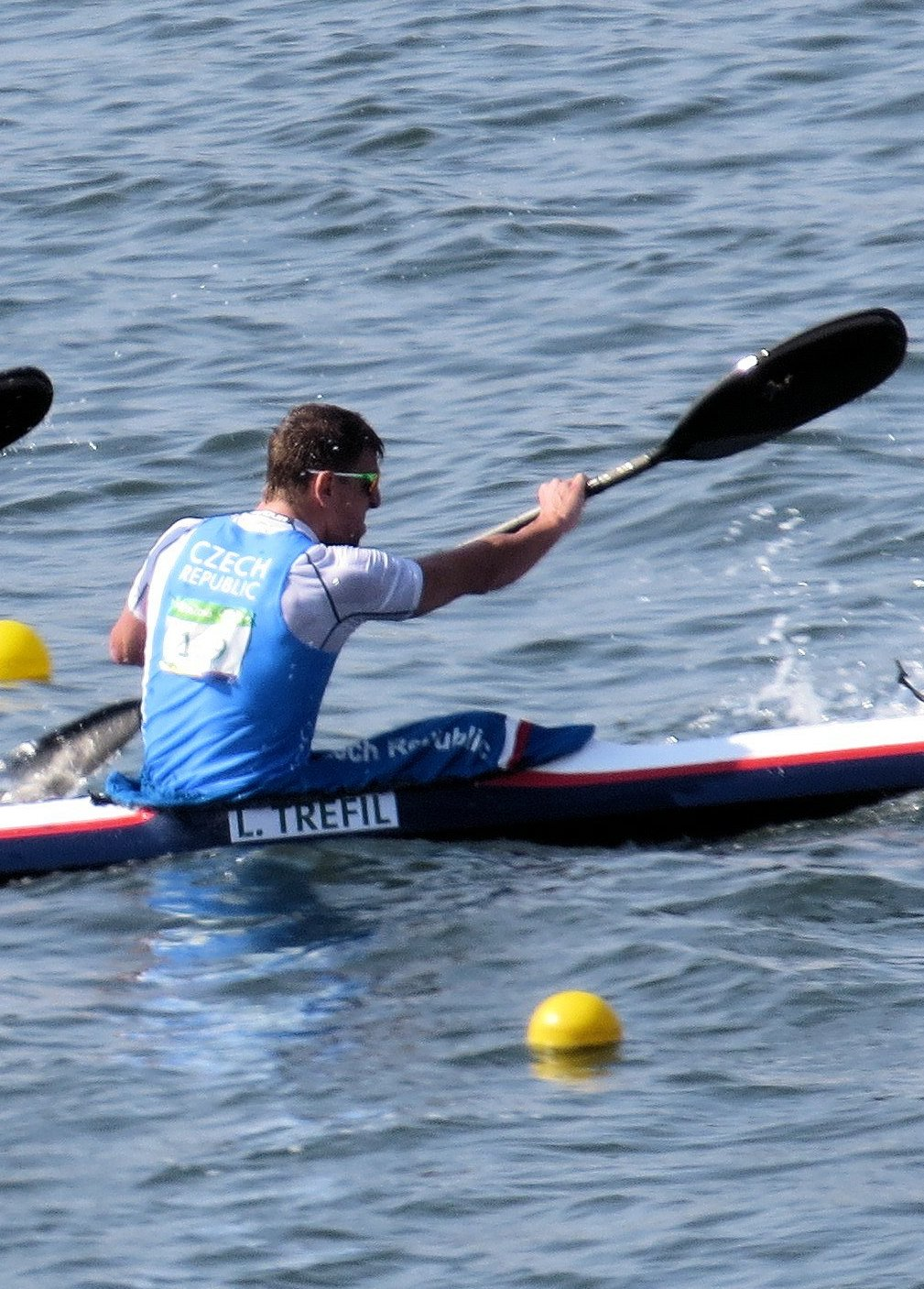

Medal record

Men's canoe sprint

Representing Czech Republic

Olympic Games
Bronze medal – third place	2012 London	K-4 1000 m
Bronze medal – third place	2016 Rio de Janeiro	K-4 1000 m

World Championships
Gold medal – first place	2014 Moscow	K-4 1000 m
Silver medal – second place	2013 Duisburg	K-4 1000 m
Bronze medal – third place	2015 Milan	K-4 1000 m

European Championships
Gold medal – first place	2015 Račice	K-4 1000 m
Gold medal – first place	2013 Montemor-o-Velho	K-4 1000 m
Gold medal – first place	2014 Brandenburg	K-4 1000 m

Lukáš Trefil (Czech pronunciation: [ˈlukaːʃ ˈtrɛfɪl]; born 21 September 1988 in Prague) is a Czech canoeist. He won a bronze medal at the 2012 Summer Olympics and the 2016 Olympics in the K-4 1000 m event.

He has also been a World Champion and multiple time European champion in this event.

He first began canoeing in 1998 and began competing in 2005.
