= 2021 ICF Canoe Sprint World Championships – Men's K-2 1000 metres =

Men's K-2 1000 metres at the 2021 ICF Canoe Sprint World Championships
- Venue: Lake Bagsværd
- Location: Copenhagen, Denmark
- Dates: 16–18 September
- Competitors: 34 from 17 nations
- Winning time: 3:13.70

Medalists
gold medal	Dennis Kernen; Martin Nathell	Sweden
silver medal	Simon Jensen; Morten Graversen	Denmark
bronze medal	Bálint Noé; Tamás Kulifai	Hungary

The men's K-2 1000 metres competition at the 2021 ICF Canoe Sprint World Championships in Copenhagen took place on Lake Bagsværd.

== Schedule ==
The schedule was as follows:

Date	Time	Round
Thursday 16 September 2021	14:00	Heats
Friday 17 September 2021	14:25	Semifinal
Saturday 18 September 2021	12:16	Final

All times are Central European Summer Time (UTC+2)

== Results ==
=== Heats ===
The fastest three boats in each heat advanced directly to the final.
The next four fastest boats in each heat, plus the fastest remaining boat advanced to the semifinal.

==== Heat 1 ====
Rank	Kayakers	Country	Time	Notes
1	Jakob Kurschat; Jakob Thordsen	Germany	3:26.81	QF
2	Simon Jensen; Morten Graversen	Denmark	3:27.37	QF
3	Bálint Noé; Tamás Kulifai	Hungary	3:29.82	QF
4	Ervin Holpert; Andjelo Dzombeta	Serbia	3:33.28	QS
5	Matthew Johnson; Daniel Johnson	Great Britain	3:33.31	QS
6	Viacheslav Liubchych; Oleksandr Syromiatnykov	Ukraine	3:33.91	QS
7	Vitaly Ershov; Vasily Pogreban	RCF	3:34.38	QS
8	Radoslav Stefanov; Veselin Valchov	Bulgaria	3:35.35	qS
9	Pedro Vázquez; Pelayo Roza	Spain	3:35.38	

==== Heat 2 ====
Rank	Kayakers	Country	Time	Notes
1	Dennis Kernen; Martin Nathell	Sweden	3:30.13	QF
2	Pavel Miadzvedzeu; Vitaliy Bialko	Belarus	3:31.77	QF
3	Jon Amund Vold; Edvind Vold	Norway	3:32.76	QF
4	Tomas Sobisek; Jakub Brabec	Czech Republic	3:36.19	QS
5	Peter Gelle; Ákos Gacsal	Slovakia	3:37.15	QS
6	Brian Malfesi; Vincent Jourdenais	Canada	3:39.16	QS
7	Daniel Burciu; Constantin Mironescu	Romania	3:59.06	QS
–	Wang Huailong; Yang Junling	China	DNS	

=== Semifinal ===
The fastest three boats advanced to the final.

Rank	Kayakers	Country	Time	Notes
1	Ervin Holpert; Andjelo Dzombeta	Serbia	3:18.89	QF
2	Peter Gelle; Ákos Gacsal	Slovakia	3:20.19	QF
3	Tomas Sobisek; Jakub Brabec	Czech Republic	3:21.07	QF
4	Matthew Johnson; Daniel Johnson	Great Britain	3:21.27	
5	Vitaly Ershov; Vasily Pogreban	RCF	3:22.27	
6	Brian Malfesi; Vincent Jourdenais	Canada	3:23.59	
7	Viacheslav Liubchych; Oleksandr Syromiatnykov	Ukraine	3:23.76	
8	Radoslav Stefanov; Veselin Valchov	Bulgaria	3:24.47	
9	Daniel Burciu; Constantin Mironescu	Romania	3:32.07	

=== Final ===
Competitors raced for positions 1 to 9, with medals going to the top three.

Rank	Kayakers	Country	Time
1st place, gold medalist(s)	Dennis Kernen; Martin Nathell	Sweden	3:13.70
2nd place, silver medalist(s)	Simon Jensen; Morten Graversen	Denmark	3:14.46
3rd place, bronze medalist(s)	Bálint Noé; Tamás Kulifai	Hungary	3:14.83
4	Pavel Miadzvedzeu; Vitaliy Bialko	Belarus	3:15.02
5	Jakob Kurschat; Jakob Thordsen	Germany	3:17.14
6	Tomas Sobisek; Jakub Brabec	Czech Republic	3:17.94
7	Ervin Holpert; Andjelo Dzombeta	Serbia	3:18.04
8	Jon Amund Vold; Edvind Vold	Norway	3:18.54
9	Peter Gelle; Ákos Gacsal	Slovakia	3:18.87
