= 2019 ICF Canoe Sprint World Championships – Men's K-1 5000 metres =

Men's K-1 5000 metres at the 2019 ICF Canoe Sprint World Championships
- Venue: Olympic Centre of Szeged
- Location: Szeged, Hungary
- Dates: 25 August
- Competitors: 38 from 38 nations
- Winning time: 19:54.07

Medalists
gold medal	Aleh Yurenia	Belarus
silver medal	Max Hoff	Germany
bronze medal	Fernando Pimenta	Portugal

The men's K-1 5000 metres competition at the 2019 ICF Canoe Sprint World Championships in Szeged took place at the Olympic Centre of Szeged.

== Schedule ==
The schedule was as follows:

Date	Time	Round
Sunday 25 August 2019	16:25	Final

All times are Central European Summer Time (UTC+2)

== Results ==
As a long-distance event, it was held as a direct final.

Rank	Kayaker	Country	Time
1st place, gold medalist(s)	Aleh Yurenia	Belarus	19:54.07
2nd place, silver medalist(s)	Max Hoff	Germany	19:57.56
3rd place, bronze medalist(s)	Fernando Pimenta	Portugal	20:19.94
4	Joakim Lindberg	Sweden	20:20.55
5	Jošt Zakrajšek	Slovenia	20:21.46
6	Artuur Peters	Belgium	20:23.66
7	Francisco Cubelos	Spain	20:38.94
8	Agustín Vernice	Argentina	20:42.68
9	Bálint Noé	Hungary	20:59.88
10	Eivind Vold	Norway	21:11.16
11	Samuele Burgo	Italy	21:14.37
12	Quaid Thompson	New Zealand	21:14.72
13	Oleg Siniavin	Russia	21:15.25
14	Bram Brandjes	Netherlands	21:15.68
15	Barry Watkins	Ireland	21:20.85
16	Ilya Podpolnyy	Israel	21:24.73
17	Pavel Davidek	Czech Republic	21:28.82
18	Oleksandr Syromiatnykov	Ukraine	21:30.76
19	Ervin Holpert	Serbia	21:33.67
20	Vagner Souta	Brazil	21:54.89
21	René Holten Poulsen	Denmark	21:59.57
22	Aleksey Mochalov	Uzbekistan	22:01.25
23	Mathew Bowley	Great Britain	22:03.16
24	Andri Summermatter	Switzerland	22:06.98
25	Cheung Tsz Chun	Hong Kong	22:12.32
26	Nathan Humberston	United States	22:30.99
27	Wang Chi	China	23:15.03
28	Sifiso Albert Masina	South Africa	23:15.34
29	Amado Cruz	Belize	23:27.15
–	Abdusattor Gafurov	Tajikistan	DNF
–	Sebastián Delgado	Uruguay	DNF
–	Koyo Niioka	Japan	DNF
–	Ali Aghamirzaei	Iran	DNF
–	Choi Min-kyu	South Korea	DSQ
–	Joel McKitterick	Australia	DSQ
–	Rafał Rosolski	Poland	DNS
–	Vladimir Alaverdyan	Armenia	DNS
–	Edwin Amaya	Colombia	DNS
