= 2018 ICF Canoe Sprint World Championships – Men's K-2 1000 metres =

Men's K-2 1000 metres at the 2018 ICF Canoe Sprint World Championships
- Venue: Centro de Alto Rendimento de Montemor-o-Velho
- Location: Montemor-o-Velho, Portugal
- Dates: 23–24 August
- Competitors: 46 from 23 nations
- Winning time: 3:15.797

Medalists
gold medal	Max Hoff; Marcus Gross	Germany
silver medal	Francisco Cubelos; Iñigo Peña	Spain
bronze medal	Marko Tomićević; Milenko Zorić	Serbia

The men's K-2 1000 metres competition at the 2018 ICF Canoe Sprint World Championships in Montemor-o-Velho took place at the Centro de Alto Rendimento de Montemor-o-Velho.

== Schedule ==
The schedule was as follows:

Date	Time	Round
Thursday 23 August 2018	09:44	Heats
Friday 24 August 2018	09:30	Semifinals
Friday 24 August 2018	14:57	Final B
Friday 24 August 2018	15:44	Final A

All times are Western European Summer Time (UTC+1)

== Results ==
=== Heats ===
Heat winners advanced directly to the A final. The next six fastest boats in each heat advanced to the semifinals.

==== Heat 1 ====
Rank	Kayakers	Country	Time	Notes
1	Marko Tomićević; Milenko Zorić	Serbia	3:12.592	QA
2	Francisco Cubelos; Iñigo Peña	Spain	3:16.952	QS
3	Ričardas Nekriošius; Andrej Olijnik	Lithuania	3:18.492	QS
4	Jon Amund Vold; Jo Sondre Solhaug	Norway	3:20.917	QS
5	Luca Beccaro; Tommaso Freschi	Italy	3:24.082	QS
6	Daniel Dal Bo; Manuel Micaz	Argentina	3:29.002	QS
7	Hamish Lovemore; Cameron Hudson	South Africa	3:30.808	QS

==== Heat 2 ====
Rank	Kayakers	Country	Time	Notes
1	Max Hoff; Marcus Gross	Germany	3:12.197	QA
2	Peter Gelle; Adam Botek	Slovakia	3:13.532	QS
3	Riley Fitzsimmons; Jordan Wood	Australia	3:15.212	QS
4	Martin Brzeziński; Rafał Rosolski	Poland	3:16.367	QS
5	Maxime Beaumont; Guillaume Burger	France	3:16.997	QS
6	Martin Nathell; Albert Petersson	Sweden	3:17.412	QS
7	Thomas Lusty; Daniel Johnson	Great Britain	3:19.462	QS
8	Abdelmajid Jabbour; Ossama Bousserra	Morocco	4:30.401	

==== Heat 3 ====
Rank	Kayakers	Country	Time	Notes
1	Pavel Miadzvedzeu; Aleh Yurenia	Belarus	3:14.117	QA
2	René Holten Poulsen; Morten Graversen	Denmark	3:16.143	QS
3	Jakub Špicar; Daniel Havel	Czech Republic	3:18.763	QS
4	Bruno Moreira; Fabio Cameira	Portugal	3:19.248	QS
5	Oleksandr Syromiatnykov; Serhiy Bashtovyy	Ukraine	3:19.863	QS
6	Bálint Noé; Róbert Ilyés	Hungary	3:20.173	QS
7	Igor Kalashnikov; Alexey Vostrikov	Russia	3:20.213	QS
8	Fabio Wyss; Andri Summermatter	Switzerland	3:20.263	

=== Semifinals ===
Qualification was as follows:

The fastest three boats in each semi advanced to the A final.
The next four fastest boats in each semi, plus the fastest remaining boat advanced to the B final.

==== Semifinal 1 ====
Rank	Kayakers	Country	Time	Notes
1	Riley Fitzsimmons; Jordan Wood	Australia	3:11.320	QA
2	Maxime Beaumont; Guillaume Burger	France	3:12.460	QA
3	Francisco Cubelos; Iñigo Peña	Spain	3:13.485	QA
4	Jon Amund Vold; Jo Sondre Solhaug	Norway	3:13.955	QB
5	Jakub Špicar; Daniel Havel	Czech Republic	3:14.495	QB
6	Bálint Noé; Róbert Ilyés	Hungary	3:17.025	QB
7	Bruno Moreira; Fabio Cameira	Portugal	3:17.485	QB
8	Thomas Lusty; Daniel Johnson	Great Britain	3:18.495	qB
9	Daniel Dal Bo; Manuel Micaz	Argentina	3:23.430	

==== Semifinal 2 ====
Rank	Kayakers	Country	Time	Notes
1	Peter Gelle; Adam Botek	Slovakia	3:13.024	QA
2	René Holten Poulsen; Morten Graversen	Denmark	3:13.794	QA
3	Ričardas Nekriošius; Andrej Olijnik	Lithuania	3:14.099	QA
4	Martin Brzeziński; Rafał Rosolski	Poland	3:14.459	QB
5	Martin Nathell; Albert Petersson	Sweden	3:16.605	QB
6	Luca Beccaro; Tommaso Freschi	Italy	3:16.730	QB
7	Oleksandr Syromiatnykov; Serhiy Bashtovyy	Ukraine	3:19.385	QB
8	Igor Kalashnikov; Alexey Vostrikov	Russia	3:20.145	
9	Hamish Lovemore; Cameron Hudson	South Africa	3:31.035	

=== Finals ===
==== Final B ====
Competitors in this final raced for positions 10 to 18.

Rank	Kayakers	Country	Time
1	Martin Brzeziński; Rafał Rosolski	Poland	3:17.719
2	Martin Nathell; Albert Petersson	Sweden	3:18.994
3	Jakub Špicar; Daniel Havel	Czech Republic	3:19.654
4	Bálint Noé; Róbert Ilyés	Hungary	3:20.389
5	Jon Amund Vold; Jo Sondre Solhaug	Norway	3:20.704
6	Luca Beccaro; Tommaso Freschi	Italy	3:22.644
7	Oleksandr Syromiatnykov; Serhiy Bashtovyy	Ukraine	3:25.394
8	Bruno Moreira; Fabio Cameira	Portugal	3:27.654
9	Thomas Lusty; Daniel Johnson	Great Britain	3:29.759

==== Final A ====
Competitors in this final raced for positions 1 to 9, with medals going to the top three.

Rank	Kayakers	Country	Time
1st place, gold medalist(s)	Max Hoff; Marcus Gross	Germany	3:15.797
2nd place, silver medalist(s)	Francisco Cubelos; Iñigo Peña	Spain	3:16.617
3rd place, bronze medalist(s)	Marko Tomićević; Milenko Zorić	Serbia	3:17.407
4	Riley Fitzsimmons; Jordan Wood	Australia	3:17.432
5	René Holten Poulsen; Morten Graversen	Denmark	3:20.228
6	Peter Gelle; Adam Botek	Slovakia	3:20.843
7	Maxime Beaumont; Guillaume Burger	France	3:21.113
8	Pavel Miadzvedzeu; Aleh Yurenia	Belarus	3:22.143
9	Ričardas Nekriošius; Andrej Olijnik	Lithuania	3:24.678
