= 2019 ICF Canoe Sprint World Championships – Men's C-2 500 metres =

Sprint World Championships

Men's C-2 500 metres at the 2019 ICF Canoe Sprint World Championships
- Venue: Olympic Centre of Szeged
- Location: Szeged, Hungary
- Dates: 21–23 August
- Competitors: 36 from 18 nations
- Winning time: 1:37.33

Medalists
gold medal	Li Qiang; Xing Song	China
silver medal	Jonatán Hajdu; Ádám Fekete	Hungary
bronze medal	Sete Benavides; Antoni Segura	Spain

The men's C-2 500 metres competition at the 2019 ICF Canoe Sprint World Championships in Szeged took place at the Olympic Centre of Szeged.

== Schedule ==
The schedule was as follows:

Date	Time	Round
Wednesday 21 August 2019	11:19	Heats
Thursday 22 August 2019	15:00	Semifinal
Friday 23 August 2019	15:39	Final

All times are Central European Summer Time (UTC+2)

== Results ==
=== Heats ===
The fastest three boats in each heat advanced directly to the final.
The next four fastest boats in each heat, plus the fastest remaining boat advanced to the semifinal.

==== Heat 1 ====
Rank	Canoeists	Country	Time	Notes
1	Jonatán Hajdu; Ádám Fekete	Hungary	1:42.81	QF
2	Jan Vandrey; Conrad Scheibner	Germany	1:43.47	QF
3	Michał Lubniewski; Arsen Śliwiński	Poland	1:43.85	QF
4	Sergiu Craciun; Nicolae Craciun	Italy	1:44.12	QS
5	Evgeniy Tengel; Maksim Krysko	Belarus	1:45.76	QS
6	Sete Benavides; Antoni Segura	Spain	1:47.15	QS
7	Eduard Shemetylo; Yurii Vandiuk	Ukraine	1:47.60	QS
8	Yutthana Porananon; Pitpiboon Mahawattanangkul	Thailand	1:53.99	qS
9	Ryan Grady; Jonathan Grady	United States	1:59.37	

==== Heat 2 ====
Rank	Canoeists	Country	Time	Notes
1	Li Qiang; Xing Song	China	1:43.13	QF
2	Pavel Petrov; Mikhail Pavlov	Russia	1:43.99	QF
3	Artur Guliev; Elyorjon Mamadaliev	Uzbekistan	1:44.14	QF
4	Filip Dvořák; Tomáš Janda	Czech Republic	1:44.78	QS
5	Constantin Diba; Gheorghe Stoian	Romania	1:52.94	QS
6	Gaurav Tomar; Sunil Singh Salam	India	1:53.76	QS
7	Hwang Seon-hong; Kim Yi-yeol	South Korea	1:58.53	QS
8	Mussa Chamaune; Nordino Mussa	Mozambique	2:12.79	
–	Daniel Leon; Cristian Sola	Ecuador	DNS	

=== Semifinal ===
The fastest three boats advanced to the final.

Rank	Canoeists	Country	Time	Notes
1	Sergiu Craciun; Nicolae Craciun	Italy	1:40.72	QF
2	Sete Benavides; Antoni Segura	Spain	1:40.97	QF
3	Filip Dvořák; Tomáš Janda	Czech Republic	1:41.62	QF
4	Evgeniy Tengel; Maksim Krysko	Belarus	1:41.99	
5	Eduard Shemetylo; Yurii Vandiuk	Ukraine	1:42.20	
6	Constantin Diba; Gheorghe Stoian	Romania	1:42.40	
7	Yutthana Porananon; Pitpiboon Mahawattanangkul	Thailand	1:47.08	
8	Gaurav Tomar; Sunil Singh Salam	India	1:50.58	
9	Hwang Seon-hong; Kim Yi-yeol	South Korea	1:58.76	

=== Final ===
Competitors raced for positions 1 to 9, with medals going to the top three.

Rank	Canoeists	Country	Time
1st place, gold medalist(s)	Li Qiang; Xing Song	China	1:37.33
2nd place, silver medalist(s)	Jonatán Hajdu; Ádám Fekete	Hungary	1:38.41
3rd place, bronze medalist(s)	Sete Benavides; Antoni Segura	Spain	1:38.97
4	Pavel Petrov; Mikhail Pavlov	Russia	1:39.04
5	Jan Vandrey; Conrad Scheibner	Germany	1:39.43
6	Sergiu Craciun; Nicolae Craciun	Italy	1:40.99
7	Filip Dvořák; Tomáš Janda	Czech Republic	1:41.88
8	Michał Lubniewski; Arsen Śliwiński	Poland	1:42.47
9	Artur Guliev; Elyorjon Mamadaliev	Uzbekistan	1:50.58
