= 2024 ICF Canoe Sprint World Championships – Men's K-2 1000 metres =

Men's K-2 1000 metres at the 2024 ICF Canoe Sprint World Championships
- Venue: Rowing and Canoeing Race Course in Samarkand
- Location: Samarkand, Uzbekistan
- Dates: 23–24 August
- Competitors: 32 from 16 nations
- Winning time: 3:19.104

Medalists
| gold medal | Mikita Borykau; Aleh Yurenia | Authorised Neutral Athletes |
| silver medal | Joakim Lindberg; Martin Nathell | Sweden |
| bronze medal | Felix Frank; Martin Hiller | Germany |

The men's K-2 1000 metres competition at the 2024 ICF Canoe Sprint World Championships in Samarkand took place in Rowing and Canoeing Race Course in Samarkand.

== Schedule ==
The schedule is as follows:

| Date | Time | Round |
|---|---|---|
| Friday 23 August 2024 | 9:14 | Heats |
| Friday 23 August 2024 | 11:07 | Semifinals |
| Saturday 24 August 2024 | 17:39 | Final |

== Results ==
=== Heats ===
The fastest three boats in each heat advanced directly to the final.
The next four fastest boats in each heat, plus the fastest remaining boat advanced to the semifinal

==== Heat 1 ====
| Rank | Canoeist | Country | Time | Notes |
|---|---|---|---|---|
| 1 | Felix Frank; Martin Hiller | Germany | 3:19.312 | QF |
| 2 | Bence Vajda; Tamás Szántói-Szabó | Hungary | 3:21.349 | QF |
| 3 | Mads Pedersen; Rasmus Brandstrup Knudsen | Denmark | 3:21.406 | QF |
| 4 | Vilém Kukačka; Jakub Zavřel | Czech Republic | 3:25.640 | QS |
| 5 | Milan Dörner; Ákos Gacsal | Slovakia | 3:29.526 | QS |
| 6 | Erlan Sultangaziev; Rysbek Tolomushev | Kyrgyzstan | 3:30.962 | QS |
| 7 | Nathan Humberston; Augustus Cook | United States | 3:32.941 | QS |
| 8 | Himanshu Tandan; Akshit Baroi | India | 3:52.442 | |
| | Nekruz Zuhurov; Abdurasul Haitov | Tajikistan | DNS | |

==== Heat 2 ====
| Rank | Canoeist | Country | Time | Notes |
|---|---|---|---|---|
| 1 | Joakim Lindberg; Martin Nathell | Sweden | 3:18.216 | QF |
| 2 | Pedro Vázquez; Íñigo Peña | Spain | 3:19.042 | QF |
| 3 | Mikita Borykau; Aleh Yurenia | Authorised Neutral Athletes | 3:19.371 | QF |
| 4 | Vladyslav Voloshin; Oleksandr Syromiatnykov | Ukraine | 3:23.176 | QS |
| 5 | Gunnar Nydal Eide; Jon Amund Vold | Norway | 3:25.045 | QS |
| 6 | Park Ju-hyeon; Jang Sang-won | South Korea | 3:25.617 | QS |
| 7 | Samandar Khaydarov; Shakhriyor Makhkamov | Uzbekistan | 3:39.473 | QS |
| 8 | Bekarys Ramatulla; Sergii Tokarnytskyi | Kazakhstan | 3:39.480 | qS |

=== Semifinal ===
The fastest three boats advanced to the A final.

| Rank | Canoeist | Country | Time | Notes |
|---|---|---|---|---|
| 1 | Vladyslav Voloshin; Oleksandr Syromiatnykov | Ukraine | 3:23.664 | QF |
| 2 | Vilém Kukačka; Jakub Zavřel | Czech Republic | 3:23.687 | QF |
| 3 | Milan Dörner; Ákos Gacsal | Slovakia | 3:25.035 | QF |
| 4 | Gunnar Nydal Eide; Jon Amund Vold | Norway | 3:27.958 | |
| 5 | Park Ju-hyeon; Jang Sang-won | South Korea | 3:29.496 | |
| 6 | Erlan Sultangaziev; Rysbek Tolomushev | Kyrgyzstan | 3:30.456 | |
| 7 | Nathan Humberston; Augustus Cook | United States | 3:31.019 | |
| 8 | Samandar Khaydarov; Shakhriyor Makhkamov | Uzbekistan | 3:38.510 | |
| 9 | Bekarys Ramatulla; Sergii Tokarnytskyi | Kazakhstan | 3:39.971 | |

=== Final ===
Competitors raced for positions 1 to 9, with medals going to the top three.

| Rank | Canoeist | Country | Time |
|---|---|---|---|
| 1st place, gold medalist(s) | Mikita Borykau; Aleh Yurenia | Authorised Neutral Athletes | 3:19.104 |
| 2nd place, silver medalist(s) | Joakim Lindberg; Martin Nathell | Sweden | 3:20.543 |
| 3rd place, bronze medalist(s) | Felix Frank; Martin Hiller | Germany | 3:21.736 |
| 4 | Pedro Vázquez; Íñigo Peña | Spain | 3:22.196 |
| 5 | Vilém Kukačka; Jakub Zavřel | Czech Republic | 3:24.722 |
| 6 | Milan Dörner; Ákos Gacsal | Slovakia | 3:25.874 |
| 7 | Bence Vajda; Tamás Szántói-Szabó | Hungary | 3:26.273 |
| 8 | Mads Pedersen; Rasmus Brandstrup Knudsen | Denmark | 3:26.336 |
| 9 | Vladyslav Voloshin; Oleksandr Syromiatnykov | Ukraine | 3:26.617 |
