= 2019 ICF Canoe Sprint World Championships – Men's K-2 1000 metres =

Men's K-2 1000 metres at the 2019 ICF Canoe Sprint World Championships
- Venue: Olympic Centre of Szeged
- Location: Szeged, Hungary
- Dates: 23–25 August
- Competitors: 76 from 38 nations
- Winning time: 3:20.53

Medalists
gold medal	Max Hoff; Jacob Schopf	Germany
silver medal	Francisco Cubelos; Iñigo Peña	Spain
bronze medal	Cyrille Carré; Étienne Hubert	France

The men's K-2 1000 metres competition at the 2019 ICF Canoe Sprint World Championships in Szeged took place at the Olympic Centre of Szeged.

== Schedule ==
The schedule was as follows:

Date	Time	Round
Friday 23 August 2019	09:30	Heats
Saturday 24 August 2019	15:30	Semifinals
Sunday 25 August 2019	11:04	Final C
Sunday 25 August 2019	11:11	Final B
Sunday 25 August 2019	12:00	Final A

All times are Central European Summer Time (UTC+2)

== Results ==
=== Heats ===
The five fastest boats in each heat, plus the two fastest sixth-place boats advanced to the semifinals.

==== Heat 1 ====
Rank	Kayakers	Country	Time	Notes
1	Daniel Dal Bo; Agustín Rodríguez	Argentina	3:11.83	QS
2	Luca Beccaro; Samuele Burgo	Italy	3:13.55	QS
3	Max Hoff; Jacob Schopf	Germany	3:14.74	QS
4	Martin Nathell; Albert Petersson	Sweden	3:15.92	QS
5	Louis Hattingh; Jarryd Gibson	South Africa	3:17.07	QS
6	Sebastian Delgado; Matias Otero	Uruguay	3:28.35	
7	Gwon Gihong; An Gilnam	South Korea	3:29.80	
8	Abdusattor Gafurov; Saidilhomkhon Nazirov	Tajikistan	3:48.42	

==== Heat 2 ====
Rank	Kayakers	Country	Time	Notes
1	Jordan Wood; Riley Fitzsimmons	Australia	3:10.36	QS
2	Josef Dostál; Radek Šlouf	Czech Republic	3:11.29	QS
3	Lars Magne Ullvang; Eivind Vold	Norway	3:11.35	QS
4	Taishi Tanada; Koyo Niioka	Japan	3:19.46	QS
5	Miika Nykänen; Jeremy Hakala	Finland	3:24.32	QS
6	Kwok Ka-wai; Mok Yuen Fung	Hong Kong	3:37.48	
7	Edgar Tutyan; Vladimir Alaverdyan	Armenia	3:41.75	
8	Oussama Djabali; Ayoub Haidra	Algeria	3:42.29	

==== Heat 3 ====
Rank	Kayakers	Country	Time	Notes
1	Oleh Kukharyk; Oleksandr Syromiatnykov	Ukraine	3:10.27	QS
2	René Holten Poulsen; Morten Graversen	Denmark	3:10.29	QS
3	Gábor Jakubík; Ákos Gacsal	Slovakia	3:16.19	QS
4	Zoltán Kammerer; Péter István Gál	Hungary	3:16.69	QS
5	Osbaldo Fuentes; Mauricio Figueroa	Mexico	3:19.50	QS
6	Linus Bolzern; Maurus Pfalzgraf	Switzerland	3:23.28	qS
7	Aurelian-Mădălin Ciocan; George Săndulescu	Romania	4:01.86	

==== Heat 4 ====
Rank	Kayakers	Country	Time	Notes
1	Milenko Zorić; Marko Tomićević	Serbia	3:11.00	QS
2	Kurtis Imrie; Max Brown	New Zealand	3:11.81	QS
3	Artuur Peters; Bram Sikkens	Belgium	3:12.24	QS
4	Francisco Cubelos; Iñigo Peña	Spain	3:13.35	QS
5	Pavel Miadzvedzeu; Mikita Borykau	Belarus	3:14.94	QS
6	Lin Yung-chieh; Lin Yong-bo	Chinese Taipei	3:18.22	qS
7	Miles Cross-Whiter; Alexander Lee	United States	3:20.92	
8	Mohamed Mrabet; Outail Khatali	Tunisia	3:36.75	

==== Heat 5 ====
Rank	Kayakers	Country	Time	Notes
1	Roman Anoshkin; Vladislav Litovka	Russia	3:10.63	QS
2	Ričardas Nekriošius; Andrej Olijnik	Lithuania	3:10.78	QS
3	Cyrille Carré; Étienne Hubert	France	3:10.79	QS
4	Brian Malfesi; Vincent Jourdenais	Canada	3:14.39	QS
5	Konstantinos Efthymiadis; Vladyslav Dvulyat	Greece	3:27.26	QS
6	Sunny Kumar; Atul Kumar	India	3:32.40	
7	Momen Mahran; Ahmed Elbedwihy	Egypt	3:38.67	

=== Semifinals ===
Qualification in each semi was as follows:

The fastest three boats advanced to the A final.
The next three fastest boats advanced to the B final.
The seventh, eighth and ninth-place boats advanced to the C final.

==== Semifinal 1 ====
Rank	Kayakers	Country	Time	Notes
1	Josef Dostál; Radek Šlouf	Czech Republic	3:16.54	QA
2	Ričardas Nekriošius; Andrej Olijnik	Lithuania	3:17.26	QA
3	Francisco Cubelos; Iñigo Peña	Spain	3:17.87	QA
4	Daniel Dal Bo; Agustín Rodríguez	Argentina	3:19.00	QB
5	Martin Nathell; Albert Petersson	Sweden	3:20.29	QB
6	Gábor Jakubík; Ákos Gacsal	Slovakia	3:23.86	QB
7	Milenko Zorić; Marko Tomićević	Serbia	3:30.80	QC
8	Konstantinos Efthymiadis; Vladyslav Dvulyat	Greece	3:30.93	QC
9	Miika Nykänen; Jeremy Hakala	Finland	3:37.16	QC

==== Semifinal 2 ====
Rank	Kayakers	Country	Time	Notes
1	Luca Beccaro; Samuele Burgo	Italy	3:16.02	QA
2	Cyrille Carré; Étienne Hubert	France	3:16.14	QA
3	Zoltán Kammerer; Péter István Gál	Hungary	3:16.95	QA
4	Oleh Kukharyk; Oleksandr Syromiatnykov	Ukraine	3:17.05	QB
5	Lars Magne Ullvang; Eivind Vold	Norway	3:18.37	QB
6	Kurtis Imrie; Max Brown	New Zealand	3:18.94	QB
7	Pavel Miadzvedzeu; Mikita Borykau	Belarus	3:19.17	QC
8	Louis Hattingh; Jarryd Gibson	South Africa	3:23.93	QC
9	Lin Yung-chieh; Lin Yong-bo	Chinese Taipei	3:28.91	QC

==== Semifinal 3 ====
Rank	Kayakers	Country	Time	Notes
1	Max Hoff; Jacob Schopf	Germany	3:15.11	QA
2	Jordan Wood; Riley Fitzsimmons	Australia	3:16.64	QA
3	Roman Anoshkin; Vladislav Litovka	Russia	3:16.89	QA
4	René Holten Poulsen; Morten Graversen	Denmark	3:16.94	QB
5	Artuur Peters; Bram Sikkens	Belgium	3:19.40	QB
6	Brian Malfesi; Vincent Jourdenais	Canada	3:20.83	QB
7	Osbaldo Fuentes; Mauricio Figueroa	Mexico	3:28.73	QC
8	Linus Bolzern; Maurus Pfalzgraf	Switzerland	3:30.37	QC
9	Taishi Tanada; Koyo Niioka	Japan	3:31.24	QC

=== Finals ===
==== Final C ====
Competitors in this final raced for positions 19 to 27.

Rank	Kayakers	Country	Time
1	Pavel Miadzvedzeu; Mikita Borykau	Belarus	3:33.13
2	Milenko Zorić; Marko Tomićević	Serbia	3:35.49
3	Taishi Tanada; Koyo Niioka	Japan	3:37.20
4	Osbaldo Fuentes; Mauricio Figueroa	Mexico	3:39.52
5	Lin Yung-chieh; Lin Yong-bo	Chinese Taipei	3:40.91
6	Louis Hattingh; Jarryd Gibson	South Africa	3:40.96
7	Konstantinos Efthymiadis; Vladyslav Dvulyat	Greece	3:41.35
8	Miika Nykänen; Jeremy Hakala	Finland	3:42.69
9	Linus Bolzern; Maurus Pfalzgraf	Switzerland	3:45.31

==== Final B ====
Competitors in this final raced for positions 10 to 18.

Rank	Kayakers	Country	Time
1	René Holten Poulsen; Morten Graversen	Denmark	3:29.01
2	Artuur Peters; Bram Sikkens	Belgium	3:29.56
3	Oleh Kukharyk; Oleksandr Syromiatnykov	Ukraine	3:29.61
4	Lars Magne Ullvang; Eivind Vold	Norway	3:29.81
5	Brian Malfesi; Vincent Jourdenais	Canada	3:31.60
6	Kurtis Imrie; Max Brown	New Zealand	3:31.66
6	Martin Nathell; Albert Petersson	Sweden	3:31.66
8	Daniel Dal Bo; Agustín Rodríguez	Argentina	3:33.94
9	Gábor Jakubík; Ákos Gacsal	Slovakia	3:39.26

==== Final A ====
Competitors in this final raced for positions 1 to 9, with medals going to the top three.

Rank	Kayakers	Country	Time
1st place, gold medalist(s)	Max Hoff; Jacob Schopf	Germany	3:20.53
2nd place, silver medalist(s)	Francisco Cubelos; Iñigo Peña	Spain	3:21.79
3rd place, bronze medalist(s)	Cyrille Carré; Étienne Hubert	France	3:22.96
4	Josef Dostál; Radek Šlouf	Czech Republic	3:23.19
5	Jordan Wood; Riley Fitzsimmons	Australia	3:23.22
6	Luca Beccaro; Samuele Burgo	Italy	3:23.47
7	Roman Anoshkin; Vladislav Litovka	Russia	3:23.97
8	Zoltán Kammerer; Péter István Gál	Hungary	3:25.62
9	Ričardas Nekriošius; Andrej Olijnik	Lithuania	3:26.31
