= 2021 ICF Canoe Sprint World Championships – Men's K-1 5000 metres =

Men's K-1 5000 metres at the 2021 ICF Canoe Sprint World Championships
- Venue: Lake Bagsværd
- Location: Copenhagen, Denmark
- Dates: 19 September
- Competitors: 24 from 24 nations
- Winning time: 20:02.96

Medalists
gold medal	Bálint Noé	Hungary
silver medal	Fernando Pimenta	Portugal
bronze medal	Mads Pedersen	Denmark

The men's K-1 5000 metres competition at the 2021 ICF Canoe Sprint World Championships in Copenhagen took place on Lake Bagsværd.

== Schedule ==
The schedule was as follows:

Date	Time	Round
Sunday 19 September 2021	16:25	Final

All times are Central European Summer Time (UTC+2)

== Results ==
As a long-distance event, it was held as a direct final.

Rank	Kayaker	Country	Time
1st place, gold medalist(s)	Bálint Noé	Hungary	20:02.96
2nd place, silver medalist(s)	Fernando Pimenta	Portugal	20:03.19
3rd place, bronze medalist(s)	Mads Pedersen	Denmark	20:13.25
4	Aleh Yurenia	Belarus	20:33.04
5	Quentin Urban	France	20:33.70
6	Javier López	Spain	20:34.58
7	Tobias-Pascal Schultz	Germany	20:34.90
8	Daniel Johnson	Great Britain	20:49.34
9	Eivind Vold	Norway	21:08.39
10	Quaid Thompson	New Zealand	21:11.88
11	Andrea Schera	Italy	21:22.60
12	Martin Nathell	Sweden	21:25.45
13	Ilya Podpolnyy	Israel	21:45.90
14	Bram Brandjes	Netherlands	21:46.12
15	Manuel Micaz	Argentina	21:47.98
16	Artuur Peters	Belgium	21:58.81
17	Oleksandr Syromiatnykov	Ukraine	22:03.95
18	Eetu Kolehmainen	Finland	22:12.04
19	Marko Ujvári	Slovakia	22:18.94
20	Vasily Pogreban	RCF	23:04.55
–	Juan Rodríguez	Mexico	DNF
–	Mitchell Barran	Canada	DNF
–	Jošt Zakrajšek	Slovenia	DNS
–	Mohamed Mrabet	Tunisia	DNS
