= 2023 ICF Canoe Sprint World Championships – Men's K-2 1000 metres =

Men's K-2 1000 metres at the 2023 ICF Canoe Sprint World Championships
- Venue: Sportpark Duisburg
- Location: Duisburg, Germany
- Dates: 23–26 August
- Competitors: 46 from 23 nations
- Winning time: 3:11.512

Medalists
gold medal	Pedro Vázquez; Íñigo Peña	Spain
silver medal	Bence Vajda; Tamás Szántói-Szabó	Hungary
bronze medal	Anton Winkelmann; Leonard Busch	Germany

The men's K-2 1000 metres competition at the 2023 ICF Canoe Sprint World Championships in Duisburg took place in Sportpark Duisburg.

== Schedule ==
The schedule is as follows:

Date	Time	Round
Wednesday 23 August 2023	16:31	Heats
Thursday 24 August 2023	15:59	Semifinals
Saturday 26 August 2023	10:33	Final B
Saturday 26 August 2023	11:04	Final A

== Results ==
=== Heats ===
The fastest boats in each heat advanced directly to the final A.
The next six fastest boats in each heat advanced to the semifinal.

==== Heat 1 ====
Rank	Canoeist	Country	Time	Notes
1	Pedro Vázquez; Íñigo Peña	Spain	3:17.605	QA
2	Anton Winkelmann; Leonard Busch	Germany	3:17.900	QS
3	Brian Malfesi; Vincent Jourdenais	Canada	3:25.851	QS
4	Luke Shaw; Philip Miles	Great Britain	3:31.443	QS
5	Kevin Poljans; Alexander Pekhenko	Estonia	3:33.593	QS
6	Yojan Cano; Leocadio Pinto	Colombia	3:35.434	QS
7	Varinder Singh; Prabhat Kumar	India	03:36.471	QS
8	Ryad Bentouati; Ayoub Haidra	Algeria	4:04.793	
	Amosse Daimane; Joaquim Manhique	Mozambique	DNS	

==== Heat 2 ====
Rank	Canoeist	Country	Time	Notes
1	Luca Boscolo Meneguolo; Nicola Ripamonti	Italy	3:27.38	QA
2	Michal Kulich; Jan Vorel	Czech Republic	3:29.944	QS
3	Fletcher Armstrong; Jakob Hammond	Australia	3:32.481	QS
4	Lin Yong-bo; Lin Yung-chieh	Chinese Taipei	3:32.706	QS
5	Karl Brodén; Erik Andersson	Sweden	3:33.457	QS
6	Matevž Manfreda; Anze Pikon	Slovenia	3:36.018	QS
7	Irwan Irwan; Indra Hidayat	Indonesia	3:39.786	QS
	Jairo Domingos; Simao Camazaulo	Angola	DNF	

==== Heat 3 ====
Rank	Canoeist	Country	Time	Notes
1	Bence Vajda; Tamás Szántói-Szabó	Hungary	3:22.846	QA
2	Peter Gelle; Ákos Gacsal	Slovakia	3:29.526	QS
3	Vitalii Brezitskyi; Vitalii Bystrevskyi	Ukraine	3:31.132	QS
4	Angel Stoyanov; Veselin Valchov	Bulgaria	3:37.831	QS
5	Colbert Manson; Nathan Humberston	United States	3:50.119	QS
6	Abdelmajid Jabbour; Achraf Elaidi	Morocco	3:36.018	QS
7	Edgar Tutyan; Artur Akishin	Armenia	4:01.696	QS

=== Semifinal ===
The fastest three boats in each semi advanced to the A final. The next four fastest boats in each semi and best 8th place advanced to the final B.

==== Semifinal 1 ====
Rank	Canoeist	Country	Time	Notes
1	Anton Winkelmann; Leonard Busch	Germany	3:14.866	QA
2	Vitalii Brezitskyi; Vitalii Bystrevskyi	Ukraine	3:16.110	QA
3	Fletcher Armstrong; Jakob Hammond	Australia	3:16.608	QA
4	Angel Stoyanov; Veselin Valchov	Bulgaria	3:17.869	QB
5	Luke Shaw; Philip Miles	Great Britain	3:19.891	QB
6	Karl Brodén; Erik Andersson	Sweden	3:24.648	QB
7	Yojan Cano; Leocadio Pinto	Colombia	3:28.731	QB
8	Irwan Irwan; Indra Hidayat	Indonesia	3:31.477	qB
9	Abdelmajid Jabbour; Achraf Elaidi	Morocco	4:09.090	

==== Semifinal 2 ====
Rank	Canoeist	Country	Time	Notes
1	Peter Gelle; Ákos Gacsal	Slovakia	3:15.844	QA
2	Michal Kulich; Jan Vorel	Czech Republic	3:16.842	QA
3	Brian Malfesi; Vincent Jourdenais	Canada	3:17.317	QA
4	Lin Yong-bo; Lin Yung-chieh	Chinese Taipei	3:18.205	QB
5	Matevž Manfreda; Anze Pikon	Slovenia	3:24.277	QB
6	Kevin Poljans; Alexander Pekhenko	Estonia	3:24.369	QB
7	Varinder Singh; Prabhat Kumar	India	3:30.888	QB
8	Colbert Manson; Nathan Humberston	United States	3:38.529	
9	Edgar Tutyan; Artur Akishin	Armenia	4:06.853	

=== Finals ===
==== Final B ====
Competitors in this final raced for positions 10 to 18.

Rank	Canoeist	Country	Time
1	Lin Yong-bo; Lin Yung-chieh	Chinese Taipei	3:19.232
2	Angel Stoyanov; Veselin Valchov	Bulgaria	3:19.305
3	Luke Shaw; Philip Miles	Great Britain	3:21.160
4	Matevž Manfreda; Anze Pikon	Slovenia	3:23.996
5	Kevin Poljans; Alexander Pekhenko	Estonia	3:26.672
6	Karl Brodén; Erik Andersson	Sweden	3:27.933
7	Yojan Cano; Leocadio Pinto	Colombia	3:31.212
8	Varinder Singh; Prabhat Kumar	India	3:31.562
9	Irwan Irwan; Indra Hidayat	Indonesia	3:32.802

==== Final A ====
Competitors raced for positions 1 to 9, with medals going to the top three.

Rank	Canoeist	Country	Time
1st place, gold medalist(s)	Pedro Vázquez; Íñigo Peña	Spain	3:11.512
2nd place, silver medalist(s)	Bence Vajda; Tamás Szántói-Szabó	Hungary	3:12.366
3rd place, bronze medalist(s)	Anton Winkelmann; Leonard Busch	Germany	3:13.550
4	Peter Gelle; Ákos Gacsal	Slovakia	3:14.636
5	Brian Malfesi; Vincent Jourdenais	Canada	3:16.534
6	Luca Boscolo Meneguolo; Nicola Ripamonti	Italy	3:16.942
7	Fletcher Armstrong; Jakob Hammond	Australia	3:19.261
8	Michal Kulich; Jan Vorel	Czech Republic	3:19.575
9	Vitalii Brezitskyi; Vitalii Bystrevskyi	Ukraine	3:19.701
