= 2019 ICF Canoe Sprint World Championships – Men's K-4 1000 metres =

Men's K-4 1000 metres at the 2019 ICF Canoe Sprint World Championships
- Venue: Olympic Centre of Szeged
- Location: Szeged, Hungary
- Dates: 21–23 August
- Competitors: 48 from 12 nations
- Winning time: 2:48.79

Medalists
gold medal	Lukas Reuschenbach; Felix Frank; Jakob Thordsen; Tobias-Pascal Schultz	Germany
silver medal	Vasily Pogreban; Aleksei Vostrikov; Oleg Siniavin; Igor Kalashnikov	Russia
bronze medal	Gábor Jakubík; Juraj Tarr; Denis Myšák; Ákos Gacsal	Slovakia

The men's K-4 1000 metres competition at the 2019 ICF Canoe Sprint World Championships in Szeged took place at the Olympic Centre of Szeged.

== Schedule ==
The schedule was as follows:

Date	Time	Round
Wednesday 21 August 2019	11:51	Heats
Wednesday 21 August 2019	15:22	Semifinal
Friday 23 August 2019	16:03	Final

All times are Central European Summer Time (UTC+2)

== Results ==
=== Heats ===
The fastest three boats in each heat advanced directly to the final.
The next four fastest boats in each heat, plus the fastest remaining boat advanced to the semifinal.

==== Heat 1 ====
Rank	Kayakers	Country	Time	Notes
1	Lukas Reuschenbach; Felix Frank; Jakob Thordsen; Tobias-Pascal Schultz	Germany	2:57.88	QF
2	Vasily Pogreban; Aleksei Vostrikov; Oleg Siniavin; Igor Kalashnikov	Russia	2:59.67	QF
3	Albert Martí; Pedro Vázquez; Iago Monteagudo; Aitor Gorrotxategi	Spain	3:06.28	QF
4	Lukáš Trefil; Pavel Davidek; Tomáš Veselý; Martin Sobisek	Czech Republic	3:11.91	QS
5	Nathaniel Errez; Timothy Burdiak; Nathan Humberston; Thom Crockett	United States	3:20.02	QS
6	Sunny Kumar; Atul Kumar; Sharma Ajatsatru; Ajit Singh	India	3:23.78	QS

==== Heat 2 ====
Rank	Kayakers	Country	Time	Notes
1	Gábor Jakubík; Juraj Tarr; Denis Myšák; Ákos Gacsal	Slovakia	2:54.90	QF
2	Tamás Kulifai; Dávid Tóth; Csaba Erdőssy; Benedek Tibor Kós	Hungary	2:56.50	QF
3	Raman Piatrushenka; Pavel Miadzvedzeu; Vitaliy Bialko; Ihar Baicheuski	Belarus	2:59.96	QF
4	Hristo Rekov; Veselin Vulchov; Radoslav Stefanov; Todor Kolevski	Bulgaria	3:03.50	QS
5	Dmytro Bespalko; Vitalii Brezitskyi; Vasyl Smilka; Vitalii Bystrevskiy	Ukraine	3:05.16	QS
6	Abdusattor Gafurov; Saidilhomkhon Nazirov; Tohir Nurmuhammadi; Zohirjon Nabiev	Tajikistan	3:28.21	QS

=== Semifinal ===
The fastest three boats advanced to the final.

Rank	Kayakers	Country	Time	Notes
1	Hristo Rekov; Veselin Vulchov; Radoslav Stefanov; Todor Kolevski	Bulgaria	2:53.61	QF
2	Lukáš Trefil; Pavel Davidek; Tomáš Veselý; Martin Sobisek	Czech Republic	2:55.94	QF
3	Dmytro Bespalko; Vitalii Brezitskyi; Vasyl Smilka; Vitalii Bystrevskiy	Ukraine	2:56.69	QF
4	Nathaniel Errez; Timothy Burdiak; Nathan Humberston; Thom Crockett	United States	2:57.79	
5	Abdusattor Gafurov; Saidilhomkhon Nazirov; Tohir Nurmuhammadi; Zohirjon Nabiev	Tajikistan	3:12.62	
6	Sunny Kumar; Atul Kumar; Sharma Ajatsatru; Ajit Singh	India	3:14.18	

=== Final ===
Competitors raced for positions 1 to 9, with medals going to the top three.

Rank	Kayakers	Country	Time
1st place, gold medalist(s)	Lukas Reuschenbach; Felix Frank; Jakob Thordsen; Tobias-Pascal Schultz	Germany	2:48.79
2nd place, silver medalist(s)	Vasily Pogreban; Aleksei Vostrikov; Oleg Siniavin; Igor Kalashnikov	Russia	2:49.78
3rd place, bronze medalist(s)	Gábor Jakubík; Juraj Tarr; Denis Myšák; Ákos Gacsal	Slovakia	2:50.44
4	Tamás Kulifai; Dávid Tóth; Csaba Erdőssy; Benedek Tibor Kós	Hungary	2:52.20
5	Raman Piatrushenka; Pavel Miadzvedzeu; Vitaliy Bialko; Ihar Baicheuski	Belarus	2:52.32
6	Lukáš Trefil; Pavel Davidek; Tomáš Veselý; Martin Sobisek	Czech Republic	2:54.26
7	Albert Martí; Pedro Vázquez; Iago Monteagudo; Aitor Gorrotxategi	Spain	2:55.29
8	Hristo Rekov; Veselin Vulchov; Radoslav Stefanov; Todor Kolevski	Bulgaria	2:55.85
9	Dmytro Bespalko; Vitalii Brezitskyi; Vasyl Smilka; Vitalii Bystrevskiy	Ukraine	3:04.32
