= 2025 ICF Canoe Sprint World Championships – Men's K-1 5000 metres =

Men's K-1 5000 metres at the 2025 ICF Canoe Sprint World Championships
- Venue: Idroscalo Regatta Course
- Location: Milan, Italy
- Dates: 24 August
- Competitors: 38 from 37 nations
- Winning time: 20:53.89

Medalists
gold medal	Mads Pedersen	Denmark
silver medal	Hamish Lovemore	South Africa
bronze medal	Ádám Varga	Hungary

The men's K-1 5000 metres competition at the 2025 ICF Canoe Sprint World Championships in Milan took place at Idroscalo Regatta Course.

== Schedule ==
The schedule is as follows:

Date	Time	Round
Sunday 24 August 2025	15:50	Final

== Results ==
As a long-distance event, it was held as a direct final.

Rank	Name	Country	Time
1st place, gold medalist(s)	Mads Pedersen	Denmark	20:53.89
2nd place, silver medalist(s)	Hamish Lovemore	South Africa	21:13.36
3rd place, bronze medalist(s)	Ádám Varga	Hungary	21:24.09
4	Jon Amund Vold	Norway	21:26.01
5	Jérémy Candy	France	21:27.66
6	Fernando Pimenta	Portugal	21:41.60
7	Bautista Tomas Itria	Argentina	21:42.05
8	Aleh Yurenia	Individual Neutral Athletes	21:54.87
9	Quaid Blair Thompson	New Zealand	22:05.20
10	Andrea Dal Bianco	Italy	22:21.55
11	Pedro Vázquez	Spain	22:22.08
12	Tomáš Sobíšek	Czech Republic	22:35.44
13	Daniel Johnson	Great Britain	22:37.08
14	Samuel Balaz	Slovakia	22:45.46
15	Jošt Zakrajšek	Slovenia	22:57.38
16	Albart Flier	Netherlands	23:24.51
17	Oleksandr Syromiatnykov	Ukraine	23:30.25
18	Dmitrii Avdeev	Individual Neutral Athletes	23:32.53
19	Cameron Low	Canada	23:40.66
20	Jonas Draeger	Germany	23:45.64
21	Niko Keskinen	Finland	23:59.95
22	Rysbek Tolomushev	Kyrgyzstan	24:09.37
23	Kristians Lauris	Latvia	24:13.85
24	Masaya Tanaka	Japan	24:17.87
25	Peyman Ghavidel Siah Sofiani	Iran	24:49.11
	Musa Bangire	Uganda	DNF
	Martin Gorriti	Uruguay	DNF
	Indra Hidayat	Indonesia	DNF
	Naocha Singh Laitonjam	India	DNF
	Lee Kyeonghun	South Korea	DNF
	Fernandes Ngunza	Angola	DNF
	Mateo Pérez	Colombia	DNF
	Vojin Rudović	Serbia	DNF
	Kirill Tubayev	Kazakhstan	DNF
	Jeyhun Valikhanov	Azerbaijan	DNF
	Oleksandr Zarubin	Uzbekistan	DNF
	Jovi Jayden Kalaichelvan	Singapore	DNS
	Joakim Lindberg	Sweden	DNS
