= 2022 ICF Canoe Sprint World Championships – Men's K-2 1000 metres =

Men's K-2 1000 metres at the 2022 ICF Canoe Sprint World Championships
- Venue: Lake Banook
- Location: Dartmouth, Canada
- Dates: 4–7 August
- Competitors: 26 from 13 nations
- Winning time: 3:32.47

Medalists
gold medal	Martin Hiller; Tamás Gecső	Germany
silver medal	Samuele Burgo; Andrea Schera	Italy
bronze medal	Bálint Noé; Tamás Kulifai	Hungary

The men's K-2 1000 metres competition at the 2022 ICF Canoe Sprint World Championships in Dartmouth took place on Lake Banook.

== Schedule ==
The schedule is as follows:

Date	Time	Round
Thursday 4 August 2022	11:31	Heats
Friday 5 August 2022	15:24	Semifinals
Sunday 7 August 2022	11:59	Final A

== Results ==
=== Heats ===
The fastest three boats in each heat advanced directly to the final.
The next four fastest boats in each heat, plus the fastest remaining boat advanced to the semifinal.

==== Heat 1 ====
Rank	Canoeist	Country	Time	Notes
1	Martin Hiller; Tamás Gecső	Germany	3:21.80	QF
2	Samuele Burgo; Andrea Schera	Italy	3:22.94	QF
3	Morten Graversen; Simon Jensen	Denmark	3:23.42	QF
4	Samuel Balaz; Denis Mysak	Slovakia	3:23.52	QS
5	Aitor Gorrotxategi; Pedro Vázquez	Spain	3:33.28	QS
6	Jovi Kalaichelvan; Zhan Teo	Singapore	3:49.13	QS

==== Heat 2 ====
Rank	Canoeist	Country	Time	Notes
1	Bálint Noé; Tamás Kulifai	Hungary	3:28.07	QF
2	Filip Weckwert; Wiktor Leszczynski	Poland	3:29.22	QF
3	Vilém Kukačka; Jan Vorel	Czech Republic	3:32.25	QF
4	Cameron Low; Brian Malfesi	Canada	3:39.96	QS
5	Nathan Humberston; Nathaniel Errez	United States	3:41.15	QS
6	Osbaldo Fuentes; Daniel Ledesma	Mexico	3:48.32	QS
7	Rodrigo González; Christian Colón	Puerto Rico	4:28.64	QS

=== Semifinal ===
The fastest three boats advanced to the final.

Rank	Canoeist	Country	Time	Notes
1	Aitor Gorrotxategi; Pedro Vázquez	Spain	3:30.41	QF
2	Samuel Balaz; Denis Mysak	Slovakia	3:33.48	QF
3	Cameron Low; Brian Malfesi	Canada	3:36.54	QF
4	Osbaldo Fuentes; Daniel Ledesma	Mexico	3:39.83	
5	Nathan Humberston; Nathaniel Errez	United States	3:43.61	
6	Jovi Kalaichelvan; Zhan Teo	Singapore	3:50.00	
7	Rodrigo González; Christian Colón	Puerto Rico	4:21.62	

=== Final ===
Competitors raced for positions 1 to 9, with medals going to the top three.

Rank	Canoeist	Country	Time
1st place, gold medalist(s)	Martin Hiller; Tamás Gecső	Germany	3:32.47
2nd place, silver medalist(s)	Samuele Burgo; Andrea Schera	Italy	3:36.82
3rd place, bronze medalist(s)	Bálint Noé; Tamás Kulifai	Hungary	3:37.77
4	Morten Graversen; Simon Jensen	Denmark	3:37.97
5	Samuel Balaz; Denis Mysak	Slovakia	3:38.57
6	Filip Weckwert; Wiktor Leszczynski	Poland	3:40.07
7	Aitor Gorrotxategi; Pedro Vázquez	Spain	3:40.39
8	Vilém Kukačka; Jan Vorel	Czech Republic	3:40.79
9	Cameron Low; Brian Malfesi	Canada	3:47.45
