= 2019 ICF Canoe Sprint World Championships – Men's K-2 500 metres =

Men's K-2 500 metres at the 2019 ICF Canoe Sprint World Championships
- Venue: Olympic Centre of Szeged
- Location: Szeged, Hungary
- Dates: 22–24 August
- Competitors: 50 from 25 nations
- Winning time: 1:33.13

Medalists
gold medal	Stanislau Daineka; Dzmitry Natynchyk	Belarus
silver medal	Pelayo Roza; Pedro Vázquez	Spain
bronze medal	Marcus Gross; Martin Hiller	Germany

The men's K-2 500 metres competition at the 2019 ICF Canoe Sprint World Championships in Szeged took place at the Olympic Centre of Szeged.

== Schedule ==
The schedule was as follows:

Date	Time	Round
Thursday 22 August 2019	12:25	Heats
Friday 23 August 2019	12:21	Semifinals
Saturday 24 August 2019	09:37	Final B
Saturday 24 August 2019	12:48	Final A

All times are Central European Summer Time (UTC+2)

== Results ==
=== Heats ===
Heat winners advanced directly to the A final.
The next six fastest boats in each heat advanced to the semifinals.

==== Heat 1 ====
Rank	Kayakers	Country	Time	Notes
1	Stanislau Daineka; Dzmitry Natynchyk	Belarus	1:26.75	QA
2	Pelayo Roza; Pedro Vázquez	Spain	1:31.49	QS
3	Pierrick Bayle; Aurélien Le Gall	France	1:32.63	QS
4	Dmytro Bespalko; Vitalii Brezitskyi	Ukraine	1:33.23	QS
5	Gwon Gihong; An Gilnam	South Korea	1:36.57	QS
6	Linus Bolzern; Maurus Pfalzgraf	Switzerland	1:37.71	QS
7	Sharma Ajatsatru; Jetli Singh Ningthoujam	India	1:43.56	QS
8	Brilend Chutra; Idealj Leshi	North Macedonia	1:57.68	
–	Ahmed Sameer Jumaah Faris; Sulaiman A. S. Al-Sammarraie	Iraq	DNS	

==== Heat 2 ====
Rank	Kayakers	Country	Time	Notes
1	Zsombor Noé; Gábor Bogár	Hungary	1:28.64	QA
2	Marcus Gross; Martin Hiller	Germany	1:29.10	QS
3	Alexey Dergunov; Yevgeniy Alexeyev	Kazakhstan	1:29.60	QS
4	Miles Cross-Whiter; Alexander Lee	United States	1:31.14	QS
5	Jan Vorel; Vilém Kukačka	Czech Republic	1:31.36	QS
6	Roberts Pumpa; Mārtiņš Veispals	Latvia	1:34.01	QS
7	Tsoi Yik San; Mok Yuen Fung	Hong Kong	1:43.96	QS
8	Adam Aris; Khairul Naim Zainal	Malaysia	1:45.21	

==== Heat 3 ====
Rank	Kayakers	Country	Time	Notes
1	Ervin Holpert; Marko Novaković	Serbia	1:28.45	QA
2	Taishi Tanada; Koyo Niioka	Japan	1:31.81	QS
3	Oleg Gusev; Vitaly Ershov	Russia	1:31.91	QS
4	Sebastian Delgado; Matias Otero	Uruguay	1:32.30	QS
5	Matteo Torneo; Giulio Dressino	Italy	1:33.50	QS
6	Abdusattor Gafurov; Saidilhomkhon Nazirov	Tajikistan	1:39.45	QS
7	Edgar Tutyan; Vladimir Alaverdyan	Armenia	1:43.89	QS
8	Pita Taufatofua; Malakai Ahokava	Tonga	2:37.81	

=== Semifinals ===
Qualification was as follows:

The fastest three boats in each semi advanced to the A final.
The next four fastest boats in each semi, plus the fastest remaining boat advanced to the B final.

==== Semifinal 1 ====
Rank	Kayakers	Country	Time	Notes
1	Pelayo Roza; Pedro Vázquez	Spain	1:30.11	QA
2	Alexey Dergunov; Yevgeniy Alexeyev	Kazakhstan	1:30.35	QA
3	Jan Vorel; Vilém Kukačka	Czech Republic	1:30.93	QA
4	Dmytro Bespalko; Vitalii Brezitskyi	Ukraine	1:33.42	QB
5	Sebastian Delgado; Matias Otero	Uruguay	1:35.42	QB
6	Linus Bolzern; Maurus Pfalzgraf	Switzerland	1:35.91	QB
7	Abdusattor Gafurov; Saidilhomkhon Nazirov	Tajikistan	1:40.21	QB
8	Tsoi Yik San; Mok Yuen Fung	Hong Kong	1:46.60	
–	Oleg Gusev; Vitaly Ershov	Russia	DSQ	

==== Semifinal 2 ====
Rank	Kayakers	Country	Time	Notes
1	Marcus Gross; Martin Hiller	Germany	1:29.65	QA
2	Matteo Torneo; Giulio Dressino	Italy	1:31.65	QA
3	Pierrick Bayle; Aurélien Le Gall	France	1:32.02	QA
4	Miles Cross-Whiter; Alexander Lee	United States	1:32.82	QB
5	Taishi Tanada; Koyo Niioka	Japan	1:34.70	QB
6	Roberts Pumpa; Mārtiņš Veispals	Latvia	1:34.91	QB
7	Gwon Gihong; An Gilnam	South Korea	1:37.02	QB
8	Sharma Ajatsatru; Jetli Singh Ningthoujam	India	1:42.86	qB
9	Edgar Tutyan; Vladimir Alaverdyan	Armenia	1:43.02	

=== Finals ===
==== Final B ====
Competitors in this final raced for positions 10 to 18.

Rank	Kayakers	Country	Time
1	Miles Cross-Whiter; Alexander Lee	United States	1:34.92
2	Dmytro Bespalko; Vitalii Brezitskyi	Ukraine	1:35.29
3	Taishi Tanada; Koyo Niioka	Japan	1:35.67
4	Roberts Pumpa; Mārtiņš Veispals	Latvia	1:36.59
5	Sebastian Delgado; Matias Otero	Uruguay	1:38.12
6	Linus Bolzern; Maurus Pfalzgraf	Switzerland	1:38.79
7	Gwon Gihong; An Gilnam	South Korea	1:38.91
8	Sharma Ajatsatru; Jetli Singh Ningthoujam	India	1:47.07
–	Abdusattor Gafurov; Saidilhomkhon Nazirov	Tajikistan	DSQ

==== Final A ====
Competitors raced for positions 1 to 9, with medals going to the top three.

Rank	Kayakers	Country	Time
1st place, gold medalist(s)	Stanislau Daineka; Dzmitry Natynchyk	Belarus	1:33.13
2nd place, silver medalist(s)	Pelayo Roza; Pedro Vázquez	Spain	1:33.48
3rd place, bronze medalist(s)	Marcus Gross; Martin Hiller	Germany	1:34.50
4	Ervin Holpert; Marko Novaković	Serbia	1:34.52
5	Zsombor Noé; Gábor Bogár	Hungary	1:35.66
6	Alexey Dergunov; Yevgeniy Alexeyev	Kazakhstan	1:36.80
7	Jan Vorel; Vilém Kukačka	Czech Republic	1:37.33
8	Matteo Torneo; Giulio Dressino	Italy	1:38.08
9	Pierrick Bayle; Aurélien Le Gall	France	1:40.76
