= 2022 ICF Canoe Sprint World Championships – Mixed K-2 500 metres =

Mixed K-2 500 metres at the 2022 ICF Canoe Sprint World Championships
- Venue: Lake Banook
- Location: Dartmouth, Canada
- Dates: 4–7 August
- Competitors: 22 from 11 nations
- Winning time: 1:39.48

Medalists
gold medal	Alyssa Bull; Jackson Collins	Australia
silver medal	Teresa Portela; Fernando Pimenta	Portugal
bronze medal	Tobias Schultz; Caroline Arft	Germany

The mixed K-2 500 metres competition at the 2022 ICF Canoe Sprint World Championships in Dartmouth took place on Lake Banook.

== Schedule ==
The schedule is as follows:

Date	Time	Round
Thursday 4 August 2022	16:37	Heats
Saturday 6 August 2022	16:02	Semifinal
Sunday 7 August 2022	13:25	Final

== Results ==
=== Heats ===
The fastest three boats in each heat advanced directly to the final.
The next four fastest boats in each heat, plus the fastest remaining boat advanced to the semifinal.

==== Heat 1 ====
Rank	Canoeist	Country	Time	Notes
1	Alyssa Bull; Jackson Collins	Australia	1:41.35	QF
2	Teresa Portela; Fernando Pimenta	Portugal	1:41.94	QF
3	Tobias Schultz; Caroline Arft	Germany	1:42.33	QF
4	Levente Kurucz; Alida Dóra Gazsó	Hungary	1:43.74	QS
5	Ryuji Matsushiro; Juri Urada	Japan	1:57.21	QS
	Samaa Ahmed; Mohamed Ismail	Egypt	DNS	

==== Heat 2 ====
Rank	Canoeist	Country	Time	Notes
1	Emma Jorgensen; Magnus Sibbersen	Denmark	1:44.11	QF
2	Linnea Stensils; Petter Menning	Sweden	1:44.38	QF
3	Brian Malfesi; Courtney Stott	Canada	1:45.41	QF
4	Aaron Small; Elena Wolgamot	United States	1:46.78	QS
5	Teck Koh; Angelica See	Singapore	1:55.52	QS

=== Semifinal ===
The fastest three boats advanced to the final.

Rank	Canoeist	Country	Time	Notes
1	Aaron Small; Elena Wolgamot	United States	1:46.75	QF
2	Levente Kurucz; Alida Dóra Gazsó	Hungary	1:49.84	QF
3	Ryuji Matsushiro; Juri Urada	Japan	1:52.67	QF
4	Teck Koh; Angelica See; Magnus Sibbersen	Singapore	1:55.54	

=== Final ===
Competitors raced for positions 1 to 9, with medals going to the top three.

Rank	Canoeist	Country	Time
1st place, gold medalist(s)	Alyssa Bull; Jackson Collins	Australia	1:39.48
2nd place, silver medalist(s)	Teresa Portela; Fernando Pimenta	Portugal	1:39.79
3rd place, bronze medalist(s)	Tobias Schultz; Caroline Arft	Germany	1:39.81
4	Emma Jorgensen; Magnus Sibbersen	Denmark	1:41.40
5	Linnea Stensils; Petter Menning	Sweden	1:43.01
6	Levente Kurucz; Alida Dóra Gazsó	Hungary	1:44.97
7	Brian Malfesi; Courtney Stott	Canada	1:45.60
8	Ryuji Matsushiro; Juri Urada	Japan	1:45.62
9	Aaron Small; Elena Wolgamot	United States	1:45.63
