= 2026 ICF Canoe Sprint World Championships – Men's K-1 5000 metres =

Men's K-1 5000 metres at the 2026 ICF Canoe Sprint World Championships
- Venue: Lake Malta
- Location: Poznań, Poland
- Dates: 30 August
- Competitors: 31 from 31 nations
- Winning time: 24:15.72

Medalists
| gold medal | Fernando Pimenta | Portugal |
| silver medal | Hamish Lovemore | South Africa |
| bronze medal | Mads Brandt Pedersen | Denmark |

The men's K-1 5000 metres competition at the 2026 ICF Canoe Sprint World Championships in Poznań took place at Lake Malta.

== Schedule ==
The schedule is as follows:

| Date | Time | Round |
|---|---|---|
| Sunday 30 August 2026 | 15:50 | Final |

=== Finals ===
The K1-5000 metre event is held as a straight final. The results of that final were as follows.

| Rank | Bib | Name | Nation | Time | Gap |
|---|---|---|---|---|---|
| 1st place, gold medalist(s) | 22 | Fernando Pimenta | Portugal | 24:15.72 | |
| 2nd place, silver medalist(s) | 19 | Hamish Lovemore | South Africa | 24:17.17 | +1.45 |
| 3rd place, bronze medalist(s) | 23 | Mads Brandt Pedersen | Denmark | 24:18.17 | +2.45 |
| 4 | 18 | Amund Vold | Norway | 24:22.22 | +6.50 |
| 5 | 12 | Jacob Schopf | Germany | 25:07.12 | +51.40 |
| 6 | 25 | Quaid Blair Thompson | New Zealand | 25:10.76 | +55.04 |
| 7 | 32 | Javier Lopez Gonzalez | Spain | 25:10.81 | +55.09 |
| 8 | 20 | Bautista Tomas Itria | Argentina | 25:39.66 | +1:23.94 |
| 9 | 26 | Martin Nathell | Sweden | 25:44.49 | +1:28.77 |
| 10 | 11 | Andrea Dal Bianco | Italy | 25:46.38 | +1:30.66 |
| 11 | 31 | Aleh Yurenia | Neutral Athlete B | 26:04.03 | +1:48.31 |
| 12 | 29 | Tomas Sobisek | Czech Republic | 26:13.09 | +1:57.37 |
| 13 | 28 | Daniel Johnson | Great Britain | 26:33.58 | +2:17.86 |
| 14 | 33 | Albart Flier | Netherlands | 26:50.98 | +2:35.26 |
| 15 | 16 | Maxim Spesivtsev | Neutral Athlete A | 26:54.71 | +2:38.99 |
| 16 | 15 | Oleksandr Syromiatnykov | Ukraine | 26:59.33 | +2:43.61 |
| 17 | 34 | Oleksandr Zarubin | Uzbekistan | 27:20.00 | +3:04.28 |
| 18 | 37 | Tim Muller | Switzerland | 27:24.41 | +3:08.69 |
| 19 | 17 | Andrej Olijnik | Lithuania | 27:35.98 | +3:20.26 |
| 20 | 38 | Cole Jones | United States | 27:53.78 | +3:38.06 |
| 21 | 24 | Juraj Kukucka | Slovakia | 27:54.69 | +3:38.97 |
| 22 | 3 | Daniel Sirotin | Cyprus | 27:57.03 | +3:41.31 |
| 23 | 2 | Diogo Araujo | Cape Verde | 28:08.32 | +3:52.60 |
| 24 | 1 | Fred Kahu | Estonia | 28:20.84 | +4:05.12 |
| 25 | 14 | Jinyang Li | China | 28:23.50 | +4:07.78 |
| 26 | 9 | Mateo Pérez | Colombia | 28:23.98 | +4:08.26 |
| 27 | 36 | Danylo Michuda | Latvia | 1.LAP | |
| 28 | 40 | Chirill Savcenco | Moldova | 2.LAP | |
| 29 | 27 | Anze Pikon | Slovenia | 3.LAP | |
| 30 | 41 | Bu Tunur Saud | Saudi Arabia | 4.LAP | |
| 31 | 13 | Fernandes Ngunza | Angola | 5.LAP | |
| | 5 | Aran Benyosef | Israel | DNS | |
| | 43 | Petar Jocovic | Montenegro | DNS | |
| | 4 | Sulaiman Ahmed Saeed Al-Samarraie | Iraq | DNS | |
| | 44 | Panagiotis Antoniou | Greece | DNS | |
| | 42 | Mehdi Berkani | Algeria | DNS | |
| | 39 | Daniel Ledesma Alarcon | Mexico | DNS | |
| | 7 | Musa Bangire | Uganda | DNS | |
| | 6 | Mohamed Naffeti | Tunisia | DNS | |
