= Canoe sprint at the 2023 European Games – Men's K-2 500 metres =

Men's K-2 500 metres at the 2023 European Games
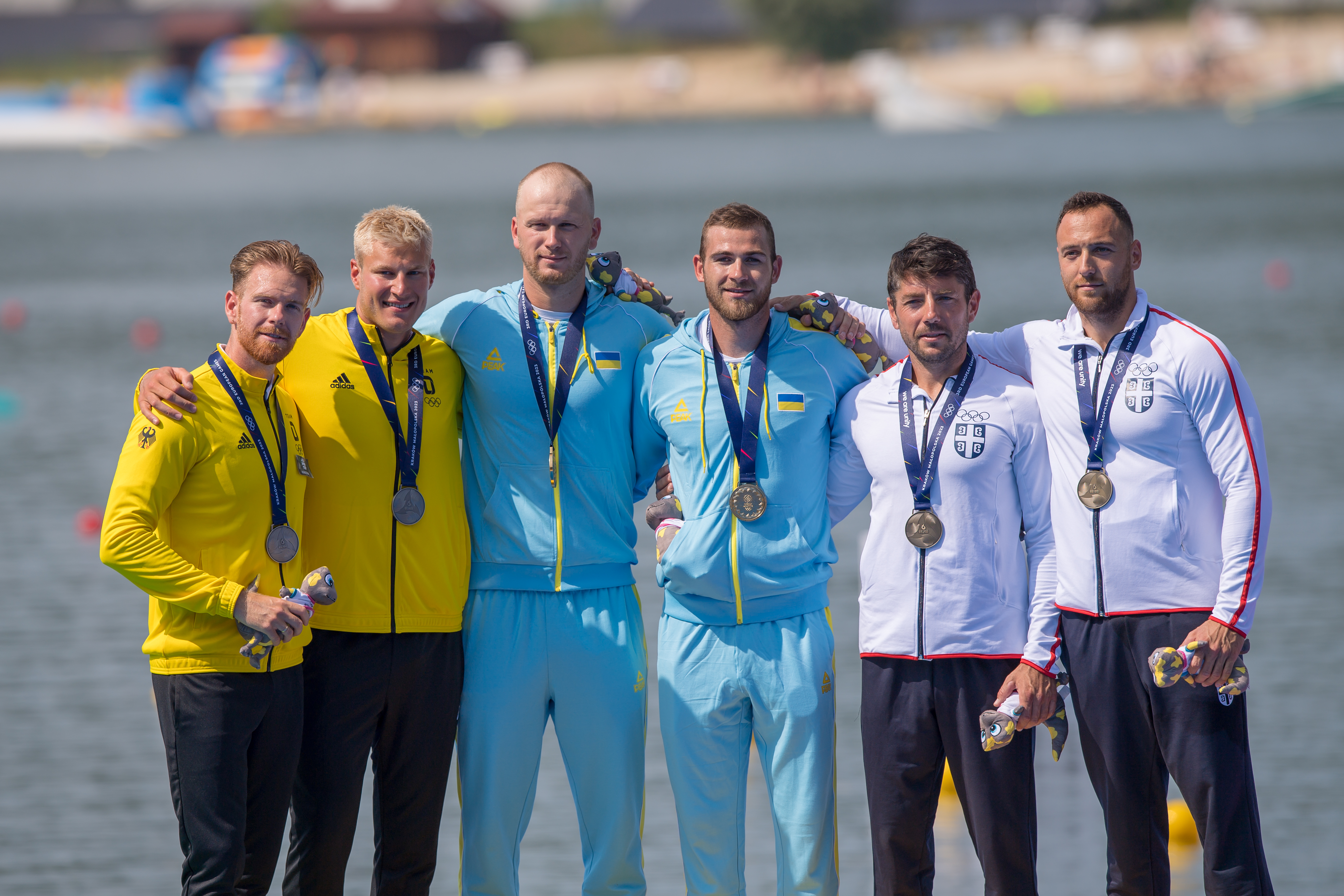
- Podium
- Venue: Kryspinów Waterway
- Date: 21–22 June
- Competitors: 44 from 22 nations
- Teams: 22
- Winning time: 1:28.928

Medalists
gold medal	Oleh Kukharyk; Ihor Trunov	Ukraine
silver medal	Felix Frank; Martin Hiller	Germany
bronze medal	Marko Dragosavljević; Ervin Holpert	Serbia

The men's K-2 500 metres canoe sprint competition at the 2023 European Games took place on 21 and 22 June at the Kryspinów Waterway.

== Schedule ==
All times are local (UTC+2).

Date	Time	Round
Wednesday, 21 June 2023	10:53	Heats
Wednesday, 21 June 2023	16:46	Semifinals
Thursday, 22 June 2023	14:07	Final B
Thursday, 22 June 2023	14:34	Final A

== Results ==
=== Heats ===
==== Heat 1 ====
Rank	Kayakers	Country	Time	Notes
1	Ervin Holpert; Marko Dragosavljević	Serbia	1:28.500	QA, GB
2	Bence Vajda; Tamás Szántói-Szabó	Hungary	1:29.900	QS
3	Erik Vlček; Ákos Gacsal	Slovakia	1:30.654	QS
4	Oleh Kukharyk; Ihor Trunov	Ukraine	1:31.047	QS
5	Angel Stoyanov; Veselin Valchov	Bulgaria	1:33.904	QS
6	George Tenta; Darius Zaharia	Romania	1:34.878	QS
7	Jakub Brabec; Radek Šlouf	Czech Republic	1:46.752	QS
8	Vladimir Maleski; Nikola Maleski	North Macedonia	1:52.166	

==== Heat 2 ====
Rank	Kayakers	Country	Time	Notes
1	João Ribeiro; Messias Baptista	Portugal	1:29.682	QA
2	Felix Frank; Martin Hiller	Germany	1:29.685	QS
3	Bram Sikkens; Artuur Peters	Belgium	1:30.958	QS
4	Joakim Lindberg; Martin Nathell	Sweden	1:31.802	QS
5	Sławomir Witczak; Jakub Michalski	Poland	1:34.242	QS
6	Elias Hollingsæter; Vemund Jensen	Norway	1:35.635	QS
7	Manfredi Rizza; Alessandro Gnecchi	Italy	1:38.156	QS

==== Heat 3 ====
Rank	Kayakers	Country	Time	Notes
1	Mindaugas Maldonis; Andrej Olijnik	Lithuania	1:30.377	QA
2	Étienne Hubert; Francis Mouget	France	1:32.980	QS
3	Eetu Kolehmainen; Jeremy Hakala	Finland	1:35.167	QS
4	Taha Usta; Emircan Ayaklı	Turkey	1:36.217	QS
5	Carlos Garrote; Lázaro López	Spain	1:39.504	QS
6	Aldis Vilde; Aleksejs Rumjancevs	Latvia	1:40.934	QS
7	Victor Aasmul; Morten Graversen	Denmark	1:41.888	QS

=== Semifinals ===
==== Semifinal 1 ====
Rank	Kayakers	Country	Time	Notes
1	Bram Sikkens; Artuur Peters	Belgium	1:32.176	QA
2	Joakim Lindberg; Martin Nathell	Sweden	1:33.082	QA
3	Erik Vlček; Ákos Gacsal	Slovakia	1:33.132	QA
4	Étienne Hubert; Francis Mouget	France	1:34.206	QB
5	Victor Aasmul; Morten Graversen	Denmark	1:34.696	QB
6	Angel Stoyanov; Veselin Valchov	Bulgaria	1:35.273	QB
7	George Tenta; Darius Zaharia	Romania	1:35.516	QB
8	Elias Hollingsæter; Vemund Jensen	Norway	1:36.639	
9	Taha Usta; Emircan Ayaklı	Turkey	1:37.349	

==== Semifinal 2 ====
Rank	Kayakers	Country	Time	Notes
1	Felix Frank; Martin Hiller	Germany	1:30.364	QA
2	Oleh Kukharyk; Ihor Trunov	Ukraine	1:30.398	QA
3	Aldis Vilde; Aleksejs Rumjancevs	Latvia	1:31.475	QA
4	Bence Vajda; Tamás Szántói-Szabó	Hungary	1:31.581	QB
5	Carlos Garrote; Lázaro López	Spain	1:32.908	QB
6	Sławomir Witczak; Jakub Michalski	Poland	1:33.798	QB
7	Manfredi Rizza; Alessandro Gnecchi	Italy	1:34.161	QB
8	Eetu Kolehmainen; Jeremy Hakala	Finland	1:34.418	qB
9	Jakub Brabec; Radek Šlouf	Czech Republic	1:42.759	

=== Finals ===
==== Final B ====
Rank	Kayakers	Country	Time
10	Bence Vajda; Tamás Szántói-Szabó	Hungary	1:31.176
11	Manfredi Rizza; Alessandro Gnecchi	Italy	1:31.826
12	Sławomir Witczak; Jakub Michalski	Poland	1:32.081
13	Étienne Hubert; Francis Mouget	France	1:33.603
14	Carlos Garrote; Lázaro López	Spain	1:33.613
15	Eetu Kolehmainen; Jeremy Hakala	Finland	1:33.738
16	Victor Aasmul; Morten Graversen	Denmark	1:33.781
17	Angel Stoyanov; Veselin Valchov	Bulgaria	1:36.619
18	George Tenta; Darius Zaharia	Romania	1:36.921

==== Final A ====
Rank	Kayakers	Country	Time
1st place, gold medalist(s)	Oleh Kukharyk; Ihor Trunov	Ukraine	1:28.928
2nd place, silver medalist(s)	Felix Frank; Martin Hiller	Germany	1:29.825
3rd place, bronze medalist(s)	Ervin Holpert; Marko Dragosavljević	Serbia	1:29.855
4	João Ribeiro; Messias Baptista	Portugal	1:29.870
5	Mindaugas Maldonis; Andrej Olijnik	Lithuania	1:30.310
6	Bram Sikkens; Artuur Peters	Belgium	1:30.773
7	Aldis Vilde; Aleksejs Rumjancevs	Latvia	1:30.815
8	Erik Vlček; Ákos Gacsal	Slovakia	1:31.503
9	Joakim Lindberg; Martin Nathell	Sweden	1:32.171
