= Anton Winkelmann =

German canoeist (born 2003)

Personal information
- Born: 27 March 2003 (age 23) Berlin, Germany

Sport
- Country: Germany
- Sport: Sprint kayak
- Event(s): K-1 1000 m, K-2 1000 m
Medal record
Men's canoe sprint
Representing Germany
World Championships
Bronze medal – third place	2023 Duisburg	K-2 1000 m

Anton Winkelmann (born 27 March 2003) is a German canoeist. He represented Germany at the 2024 Summer Olympics.

== Career ==
Winkelmann made his debut at the 2023 ICF Canoe Sprint World Championships in the K-2 1000 metres event and won a bronze medal. As a result, he qualified for the 2024 Summer Olympics.
