= Antoni Segura =

Spanish canoeist

Personal information
- Nationality: Spanish
- Born: 9 September 1996 (age 29)

Sport
- Country: Spain
- Sport: Sprint canoe
- Event: C–2 500 m
Medal record
Men's canoe sprint
Representing Spain
World Championships
Bronze medal – third place	2019 Szeged	C-2 500 m
European Championships
Silver medal – second place	2022 Munich	C-2 200 m

Antoni Segura (born 9 September 1996) is a Spanish sprint canoeist.

Antoni was a participant of the 2018 ICF Canoe Sprint World Championships. He won a medal at the 2019 ICF Canoe Sprint World Championships.
