= Felix Frank (canoeist) =

German canoeist

Personal information
- Nationality: German
- Born: 8 February 1993 (age 33)

Sport
- Country: Germany
- Sport: Sprint kayak
- Event: K–4 1000 m
Medal record
Men's canoe sprint
Representing Germany
World Championships
Gold medal – first place	2019 Szeged	K-4 1000 m
Bronze medal – third place	2024 Samarkand	K-2 1000 m
European Games
Silver medal – second place	2023 Kraków-Małopolska	K-2 500 m
European Championships
Gold medal – first place	2022 Munich	K-4 1000 m
Silver medal – second place	2022 Munich	K-2 500 m

Felix Frank (born 8 February 1993) is a German sprint canoeist.

He won a medal at the 2019 ICF Canoe Sprint World Championships.

== Major results ==
=== World championships ===
Year	K-2 500	K-2 1000	K-4 500	K-4 1000
2019				1st place, gold medalist(s)
2021			7 FB	—N/a
2022	8			—N/a
2023	6			—N/a
2024	—N/a	3rd place, bronze medalist(s)	—N/a	—N/a
