= Li Qiang (canoeist) =

Chinese sprint canoeist

Personal information
- Nationality: Chinese
- Born: 4 January 1989 (age 37) Fushun, Liaoning
- Height: 186 cm (6 ft 1 in)
- Weight: 83 kg (183 lb)

Sport
- Country: China
- Sport: Sprint canoe
- Events: C–1 200 m, C–1 500 m, C–2 500 m
- Club: Guangdong Province
Medal record
Men's sprint canoe
Representing China
World Championships
Gold medal – first place	2019 Szeged	C-2 500 m
Silver medal – second place	2010 Poznań	C-1 500 m
Silver medal – second place	2015 Milan	C-1 200 m
Asian Games
Gold medal – first place	2010 Guangzhou	C-1 200 m
Gold medal – first place	2014 Incheon	C-1 200 m
Gold medal – first place	2018 Jakarta–Palembang	C-2 200 m
Asian Championships
Gold medal – first place	2011 Tehran	C-2 1000 m
Gold medal – first place	2011 Tehran	C-4 1000 m
Silver medal – second place	2007 Hwacheon	C-1 500 m
Silver medal – second place	2013 Samarkand	C-2 200 m
Silver medal – second place	2013 Samarkand	C-2 1000 m
Bronze medal – third place	2013 Samarkand	C-1 200 m
Bronze medal – third place	2013 Samarkand	C-2 500 m

Li Qiang (Chinese: 李强, born 4 January 1989) is a Chinese male sprint canoeist who competed since the late 2000s.

He won a silver medal in the C-1 500 m event at the 2010 ICF Canoe Sprint World Championships in Poznań and the C-1 200 m at the 2015 ICF Canoe Sprint World Championships.

Li also finished sixth in the C-1 500 m event at the 2008 Summer Olympics in Beijing. At the 2012 Summer Olympics, he finished in 15th in the C-1 200 m and 8th in the C-2 1000 m with Huang Maoxing.

At 2014 Asian Games he won a gold medal in the men's C-1 200 m event.

At the 2016 Olympics, he finished 7th in the C-1 200 m.
