= Canoeing at the 2018 Asian Games – Men's C-2 200 metres =

Men's C-2 200 metres at the 2018 Asian Games
- Venue: Jakabaring Lake
- Date: 31 August – 1 September 2018
- Competitors: 20 from 10 nations

Medalists
gold medal	Xing Song; Li Qiang	China
silver medal	Artur Guliev; Elyorjon Mamadaliev	Uzbekistan
bronze medal	Merey Medetov; Timur Khaidarov	Kazakhstan

The men's sprint C-2 (canoe double) 200 metres competition at the 2018 Asian Games was held from 31 August to 1 September 2018.

== Schedule ==
All times are Western Indonesia Time (UTC+07:00)

Date	Time	Event
Friday, 31 August 2018	10:00	Heats
Friday, 31 August 2018	16:30	Semifinal
Saturday, 1 September 2018	09:00	Final

== Results ==
=== Heats ===
- Qualification: 1–3 → Final (QF), Rest → Semifinal (QS)

==== Heat 1 ====
Rank	Team	Time	Notes
1	China (CHN); Xing Song; Li Qiang	38.473	QF
2	Kazakhstan (KAZ); Merey Medetov; Timur Khaidarov	38.762	QF
3	Philippines (PHI); Hermie Macaranas; Ojay Fuentes	41.441	QF
4	South Korea (KOR); Choi Ji-sung; Kim Gyu-myeong	41.811	QS
5	India (IND); Prakant Sharma; Jamesboy Singh	43.452	QS

==== Heat 2 ====
Rank	Team	Time	Notes
1	Uzbekistan (UZB); Artur Guliev; Elyorjon Mamadaliev	38.084	QF
2	Indonesia (INA); Anwar Tarra; Marjuki	41.221	QF
3	Iran (IRI); Pejman Divsalari; Adel Mojallali	41.596	QF
4	Thailand (THA); Phanuphong Jiranarongchai; Thiraphong Ratkhamhaeng	42.608	QS
5	Tajikistan (TJK); Shahriyor Daminov; Mustafo Daminov	45.112	QS

=== Semifinal ===
- Qualification: 1–3 → Final (QF)

Rank	Team	Time	Notes
1	India (IND); Prakant Sharma; Jamesboy Singh	40.838	QF
2	South Korea (KOR); Choi Ji-sung; Kim Gyu-myeong	41.460	QF
3	Thailand (THA); Phanuphong Jiranarongchai; Thiraphong Ratkhamhaeng	42.592	QF
4	Tajikistan (TJK); Shahriyor Daminov; Mustafo Daminov	46.525	

=== Final ===
Rank	Team	Time
1st place, gold medalist(s)	China (CHN); Xing Song; Li Qiang	36.940
2nd place, silver medalist(s)	Uzbekistan (UZB); Artur Guliev; Elyorjon Mamadaliev	37.080
3rd place, bronze medalist(s)	Kazakhstan (KAZ); Merey Medetov; Timur Khaidarov	37.371
4	Iran (IRI); Pejman Divsalari; Adel Mojallali	38.399
5	Philippines (PHI); Hermie Macaranas; Ojay Fuentes	38.944
6	Indonesia (INA); Anwar Tarra; Marjuki	40.265
7	Thailand (THA); Phanuphong Jiranarongchai; Thiraphong Ratkhamhaeng	40.523
8	South Korea (KOR); Choi Ji-sung; Kim Gyu-myeong	40.860
9	India (IND); Prakant Sharma; Jamesboy Singh	41.152
