= Xing Song =

Chinese sprint canoeist

Personal information
- Nationality: Chinese
- Born: 27 August 1994 (age 32) Liaoning, China

Sport
- Country: China
- Sport: Sprint canoe
- Event: C–2 500 m
Medal record
Men's canoe sprint
Representing China
World Championships
Gold medal – first place	2019 Szeged	C-2 500 m
Asian Games
Gold medal – first place	2018 Jakarta–Palembang	C-2 200 m

Xing Song (Chinese: 邢松; pinyin: Xíng Sōng; born 27 August 1994) is a Chinese sprint canoeist.

He won a medal at the 2019 ICF Canoe Sprint World Championships.
