= Aleksei Vostrikov =

Russian canoeist

Personal information
- Full name: Aleksei Gennadiyevich Vostrikov
- Nationality: Russian
- Born: 4 January 1992 (age 34)
- Height: 1.88 m (6 ft 2 in)
- Weight: 90 kg (198 lb)

Sport
- Country: Russia
- Sport: Sprint kayak
- Event: K–4 1000 m
- Club: Voronezh School of Supreme Sports Skill
Medal record
Men's canoe sprint
Representing Russia
World Championships
Silver medal – second place	2019 Szeged	K-4 1000 m
Universiade
Gold medal – first place	2013 Kazan	K-4 1000 m

Aleksei Gennadiyevich Vostrikov (Russian: Алексей Геннадьевич Востриков; born 4 January 1992) is a Russian sprint canoeist.

He won a medal at the 2019 ICF Canoe Sprint World Championships.
