= Canoeing at the 2014 Asian Games – Men's C-1 200 metres =

Men's C-1 200 metres at the 2014 Asian Games
- Venue: Misari Regatta
- Date: 27–29 September 2014
- Competitors: 12 from 12 nations

Medalists
gold medal	Li Qiang	China
silver medal	Naoya Sakamoto	Japan
bronze medal	Adel Mojallali	Iran

The men's C-1 200 metres sprint canoeing competition at the 2014 Asian Games in Hanam was held from 27 to 29 September at the Misari Canoe/Kayak Center.

== Schedule ==
All times are Korea Standard Time (UTC+09:00)

Date	Time	Event
Saturday, 27 September 2014	14:20	Heats
Sunday, 28 September 2014	13:35	Semifinal
Monday, 29 September 2014	15:10	Final

== Results ==
Legend

- DNF — Did not finish

=== Heats ===
- Qualification: 1–3 → Final (QF), Rest → Semifinal (QS)

==== Heat 1 ====
Rank	Athlete	Time	Notes
1	Adel Mojallali (IRI)	38.173	QF
2	Mirziyodjon Khojiev (UZB)	39.231	QF
3	Kim Tae-eun (KOR)	39.805	QF
4	Spens Stuber Mehue (INA)	41.246	QS
5	Vitalii Serikov (TJK)	41.296	QS
—	Hermie Macaranas (PHI)	DNF	

==== Heat 2 ====
Rank	Athlete	Time	Notes
1	Li Qiang (CHN)	38.466	QF
2	Naoya Sakamoto (JPN)	38.487	QF
3	Sergey Yemelyanov (KAZ)	40.281	QF
4	Nares Naoprakon (THA)	42.123	QS
5	Jamesboy Singh (IND)	42.135	QS
6	Chou En-ping (TPE)	44.240	QS

=== Semifinal ===
- Qualification: 1–3 → Final (QF)

Rank	Athlete	Time	Notes
1	Vitalii Serikov (TJK)	42.239	QF
2	Spens Stuber Mehue (INA)	42.976	QF
3	Jamesboy Singh (IND)	42.996	QF
4	Nares Naoprakon (THA)	43.062	
5	Chou En-ping (TPE)	43.912	

=== Final ===
Rank	Athlete	Time
1st place, gold medalist(s)	Li Qiang (CHN)	39.270
2nd place, silver medalist(s)	Naoya Sakamoto (JPN)	39.654
3rd place, bronze medalist(s)	Adel Mojallali (IRI)	39.669
4	Mirziyodjon Khojiev (UZB)	40.674
5	Sergey Yemelyanov (KAZ)	40.791
6	Kim Tae-eun (KOR)	41.942
7	Vitalii Serikov (TJK)	42.661
8	Spens Stuber Mehue (INA)	43.085
9	Jamesboy Singh (IND)	43.981
