= Martin Hiller (canoeist) =

German canoeist (born 2000)

Personal information
- Nationality: German
- Born: 8 April 2000 (age 26) Potsdam, Germany
- Height: 189 cm (6 ft 2 in)
- Weight: 95 kg (209 lb)

Sport
- Country: Germany
- Sport: Sprint kayak
- Club: KC Potsdam
- Coached by: Arndt Hanisch
Medal record
Men's sprint kayak
Representing Germany
World Championships
Gold medal – first place	2022 Dartmouth	K-2 1000 m
Silver medal – second place	2021 Copenhagen	K-2 500 m
Bronze medal – third place	2019 Szeged	K-2 500 m
Bronze medal – third place	2024 Samarkand	K-2 1000 m
European Games
Silver medal – second place	2023 Kraków-Małopolska	K-2 500 m
European Championships
Gold medal – first place	2022 Munich	K-2 1000 m
Gold medal – first place	2022 Munich	K-4 1000 m

Martin Hiller (born 8 April 2000) is a German sprint canoeist. He became World Champion at the 2022 ICF Canoe Sprint World Championships over K2 1000 metres with his partner Tamás Grossmann.

In 2025, he received a four-year doping suspension.

== Career ==
Hillers career began with some early successes at junior world championships. At his second attempt in 2017 he won the K4 Junior 500 and reached second place in the K4 Junior 500 and K1 Junior 1000 in 2018.

In 2019, he placed third at the U23 World Championships in the K2 1000 metres race and repeated this success at the K2 Senior 500 with another third place.

In 2021, Hiller was in good form when he experienced the disappointment of only being nominated as an alternate for the Tokyo Olympics. Without him, the team won gold in the K4 over 500 metres.

In the same year, he was then able to show off his performance at the World Championships in Copenhagen: He won at the U23 World Championships over 1000 metres in the K1 and came second at the Men's World Championships in the K2 over 500 metres.

2022 was difficult for him both mentally and physically, as he struggled with cardiac arrhythmia and venous thrombosis and had to come to terms with the death of his mother. Despite this, he and his partner Tamás Grossmann became world champions in the K2 over 1000 metres in Canada. Just two weeks later, the duo also won the European Championships in Oberschleissheim in the same discipline.

In 2024, he once again missed out on making the Olympic team. Instead, he won bronze in the 1000 metres K2 at the World Championships in Sarmakand.

=== Doping ===
In 2024, just a few weeks after the World Championships in Samarkand, Uzbekistan, where he came third in the two-man kayak over 1000 metres, he tested positive in an out-of-competition doping test. A second test a month later also came back positive. The three different anabolic steroids methandrostenolone, metandienone and ostarine were detected.

He was the first case of a convicted doper that only became public in Germany as a result of an investigation by the ARD doping editorial team, as the National Anti-Doping Agency (NADA) has not published the names of any closed cases since 2020 for legal data protection reasons.

In February 2025, the case was finally decided and a four-year doping ban was imposed.

== Major results ==
=== World championships ===
Year	K-1 1000	K-2 500	K-2 1000
2019		3rd place, bronze medalist(s)	
2021	5	2nd place, silver medalist(s)	
2022			1st place, gold medalist(s)
2023		6	
2024	—N/a	—N/a	3rd place, bronze medalist(s)
