= Maksim Krysko =

Belarusian canoeist

Personal information
- Nationality: Belarusian
- Born: 28 April 1994 (age 32)

Sport
- Country: Belarus
- Sport: Sprint canoe
- Event: C-4 500 m
Medal record
Men's canoe sprint
Representing Belarus
World Championships
| Bronze medal – third place | 2019 Szeged | C-4 500 m |

Maksim Krysko (born 28 April 1994) is a Belarusian sprint canoeist.

He won a medal at the 2019 ICF Canoe Sprint World Championships.
