= Pelayo Roza =

Spanish canoeist

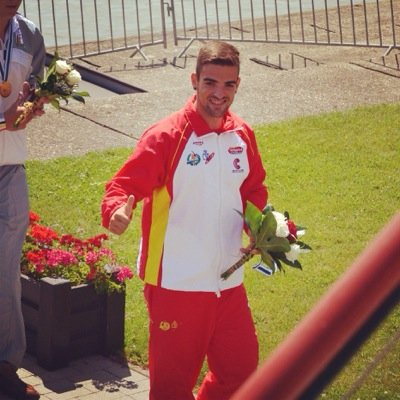

Personal information
- Full name: Pelayo Roza Fonticiella
- Nationality: Spanish
- Born: 4 May 1996 (age 30) Gijón, Spain
- Height: 179 cm (5 ft 10 in)
- Weight: 77 kg (170 lb)

Sport
- Country: Spain
- Sport: Sprint kayak
- Event(s): K-2 500 m, K-4 1000 m
Medal record
Men's canoe sprint
Representing Spain
World Championships
Silver medal – second place	2019 Szeged	K-2 500 m
Bronze medal – third place	2018 Montemor-o-Velho	K-4 1000 m
European Championships
Bronze medal – third place	2018 Belgrade	K-4 1000 m

Pelayo Roza Fonticiella (born 4 May 1996) is a Spanish sprint canoeist.

He won a bronze medal at the 2018 ICF Canoe Sprint World Championships. Also he won a bronze medal at the 2018 Canoe Sprint European Championships.
