= Oleg Siniavin =

Russian canoeist

Personal information
- Full name: Oleg Yuryevich Siniavin
- Nationality: Russian
- Born: 8 July 1995 (age 30)

Sport
- Country: Russia
- Sport: Sprint kayak
- Event: K–4 1000 m
- Coached by: A. N. Popov; L. P. Medvedev
Medal record
Men's canoe sprint
Representing Russia
World Championships
Silver medal – second place	2019 Szeged	K-4 1000 m
European Championships
Bronze medal – third place	2021 Poznań	K-4 1000 m

Oleg Yuryevich Siniavin (Russian: Олег Юрьевич Синявин; born 8 July 1995) is a Russian sprint canoeist.

He won a medal at the 2019 ICF Canoe Sprint World Championships.
