= Elyorjon Mamadaliev =

Uzbekistani sprint canoeist

Personal information
- Nationality: Uzbekistani
- Born: 5 February 1995 (age 31)

Sport
- Country: Uzbekistan
- Sport: Sprint canoe
- Event: C–2 200 m
Medal record
Men's canoe sprint
Representing Uzbekistan
World Championships
Bronze medal – third place	2019 Szeged	C-2 200 m
Asian Games
Silver medal – second place	2018 Jakarta–Palembang	C-2 200 m
Asian Championships
Gold medal – first place	2015 Palembang	C-2 200 m
Gold medal – first place	2022 Rayong	C-2 200 m
Gold medal – first place	2022 Rayong	C-2 500 m
Silver medal – second place	2017 Shanghai	C-4 200 m
Silver medal – second place	2017 Shanghai	C-4 500 m
Silver medal – second place	2022 Rayong	C-4 1000 m
Bronze medal – third place	2022 Rayong	C-4 200 m
Bronze medal – third place	2024 Tokyo	C-1 200 m

Elyorjon Mamadaliev (born 5 February 1995) is an Uzbekistani sprint canoeist.

He won a medal at the 2019 ICF Canoe Sprint World Championships.
