= Íñigo Peña =

Spanish canoeist

Personal information
- Full name: Íñigo Peña Arriola
- Nationality: Spanish
- Born: 7 September 1990 (age 35) Zumaia, Basque Country, Spain
- Height: 1.94 m (6 ft 4 in)
- Weight: 92 kg (203 lb)

Sport
- Country: Spain
- Sport: Sprint kayak
- Event(s): K-2 1000 m, K-4 1000 m
Medal record
Men's canoe sprint
Representing Spain
World Championships
| Gold medal – first place | 2023 Duisburg | K-2 1000 m |
| Silver medal – second place | 2018 Montemor-o-Velho | K-2 1000 m |
| Silver medal – second place | 2019 Szeged | K-2 1000 m |
| Bronze medal – third place | 2018 Montemor-o-Velho | K-4 1000 m |
| Bronze medal – third place | 2023 Duisburg | K-2 Mix 500 m |
European Championships
| Gold medal – first place | 2017 Plovdiv | K-4 1000 m |
| Silver medal – second place | 2022 Munich | K-2 1000 m |
| Silver medal – second place | 2022 Munich | K-4 1000 m |
| Bronze medal – third place | 2015 Račice | K-4 1000 m |
| Bronze medal – third place | 2017 Plovdiv | K-2 1000 m |
| Bronze medal – third place | 2018 Belgrade | K-2 1000 m |
| Bronze medal – third place | 2024 Szeged | K-4 1000 m |

Íñigo Peña Arriola (born 7 September 1990) is a Spanish sprint canoer.

== Career ==
He competed at the 2016 Summer Olympics in Rio de Janeiro, in the men's K-4 1000 metres.
