= Hamish Lovemore =

South African canoeist

Personal information
- Born: 19 August 1999 (age 27) Umdloti, South Africa

Sport
- Sport: Canoeing
- Events: Sprint kayak, Marathon kayak
Medal record
World Championships
Silver medal – second place	2025 Milan	K-1 5000 m
Silver medal – second place	2026 Poznań	K-1 5000 m
World Marathon Championships
Gold medal – first place	2026 Gualeguaychú	K-1 Short
Silver medal – second place	2024 Metković	K-1 Short

Hamish Lovemore (born 19 August 1999) is a South African canoeist who competes in both sprint and marathon kayaking. He represented South Africa at the 2024 Summer Olympics in Paris.

At the 2024 Olympics, Lovemore competed in the men's K-1 1000 metres, finishing ninth overall. He also competed in the men's K-2 500 metres alongside Andrew Birkett.

In 2024, he won a silver medal in the short-distance K-1 event at the 2024 ICF Canoe Marathon World Championships. The following year, he won silver in the K-1 5000 metres at the 2025 ICF Canoe Sprint World Championships. He also claimed two silver medals in K-1 (standard distance and short distance) at the canoe marathon events of the 2025 World Games in Chengdu.

== International medals ==
=== Sprint kayak ===
ICF Canoe Sprint World Championships
Year	Venue	Event	Medal
2025	Milan, Italy	K-1 5000 m	2nd place, silver medalist(s)

=== Marathon kayak ===
ICF Canoe Marathon World Championships
Year	Venue	Event	Medal
2024	Metković, Croatia	K-1 short distance	2nd place, silver medalist(s)

World Games
Year	Venue	Event	Medal
2025	Chengdu, China	K-1	2nd place, silver medalist(s)
2025	Chengdu, China	K-1 short distance	2nd place, silver medalist(s)
