= Evgeniy Tengel =

Belarusian canoeist

Personal information
- Nationality: Belarusian
- Born: 17 May 1993 (age 33)

Sport
- Country: Belarus
- Sport: Sprint canoe
- Event: C-4 500 m
Medal record
Men's canoe sprint
Representing Belarus
World Championships
Bronze medal – third place	2019 Szeged	C-4 500 m

Evgeniy Tengel (born 17 May 1993) is a Belarusian sprint canoeist.

He won a medal at the 2019 ICF Canoe Sprint World Championships.
