= Igor Kalashnikov =

Russian canoeist

Personal information
- Full name: Igor Mikhailovich Kalashnikov
- Nationality: Russian
- Born: 22 January 1993 (age 33)

Sport
- Country: Russia
- Sport: Sprint kayak
- Event: K–4 1000 m
- Coached by: L. P. Medvedev
Medal record
Men's canoe sprint
Representing Russia
World Championships
Silver medal – second place	2019 Szeged	K-4 1000 m

Igor Mikhailovich Kalashnikov (Russian: Игорь Михайлович Калашников; born 22 January 1993) is a Russian sprint canoeist.

He won a medal at the 2019 ICF Canoe Sprint World Championships.
