= Tobias-Pascal Schultz =

German canoeist

Personal information
- Nationality: German
- Born: 25 June 1995 (age 31) Essen, Germany
- Height: 1.78 m (5 ft 10 in)
- Weight: 75 kg (165 lb)

Sport
- Country: Germany
- Sport: Sprint kayak
- Club: KG Essen
Medal record
Men's sprint kayak
Representing Germany
World Championships
Gold medal – first place	2019 Szeged	K-4 1000 m
Silver medal – second place	2021 Copenhagen	K-2 500 m
Bronze medal – third place	2022 Dartmouth	K-2 Mix 500 m
European Championships
Gold medal – first place	2022 Munich	K-4 1000 m

Tobias-Pascal Schultz (*25 June 1995) is a German sprint canoeist.

== Career ==
He won a medal at the 2019 ICF Canoe Sprint World Championships.

== Life ==
Tobias-Pascal Schultz is studying mathematics and sports at the University of Wuppertal. He lives and trains in Essen, together with other canoeists like Max Hoff or Max Rendschmidt. His Grandfather is Karl-Heinz Weißenfels.
