= Jakob Thordsen =

German canoeist

Personal information
- Nationality: German
- Born: 22 October 1999 (age 26) Hamburg, Germany

Sport
- Country: Germany
- Sport: Sprint kayak
- Event: K-4 1000 m
- Club: HKC Hannover
Medal record
Men's canoe sprint
Representing Germany
World Championships
Gold medal – first place	2018 Montemor-o-Velho	K-4 1000 m
Gold medal – first place	2019 Szeged	K-4 1000 m
Bronze medal – third place	2023 Duisburg	K-1 1000 m

Jakob Thordsen (born 1999 in Hamburg) is a German sprint canoeist.

He won a gold medal in K-4 1000m at the 2018 ICF Canoe Sprint World Championships and the 2019 ICF Canoe Sprint World Championships, and a bronze medal in the K-1 1000m at the 2023 ICF Canoe Sprint World Championships. He finished 8th in the K-1 1000m at the 2024 Summer Olympics.

As a career outside sport, he has learnt and works as a mechatronics technician.

== Early life ==
Thordsen moved from Hamburg to a sports boarding school in Hannover in 2014.
