= Vasily Pogreban =

Russian canoeist (born 1989)

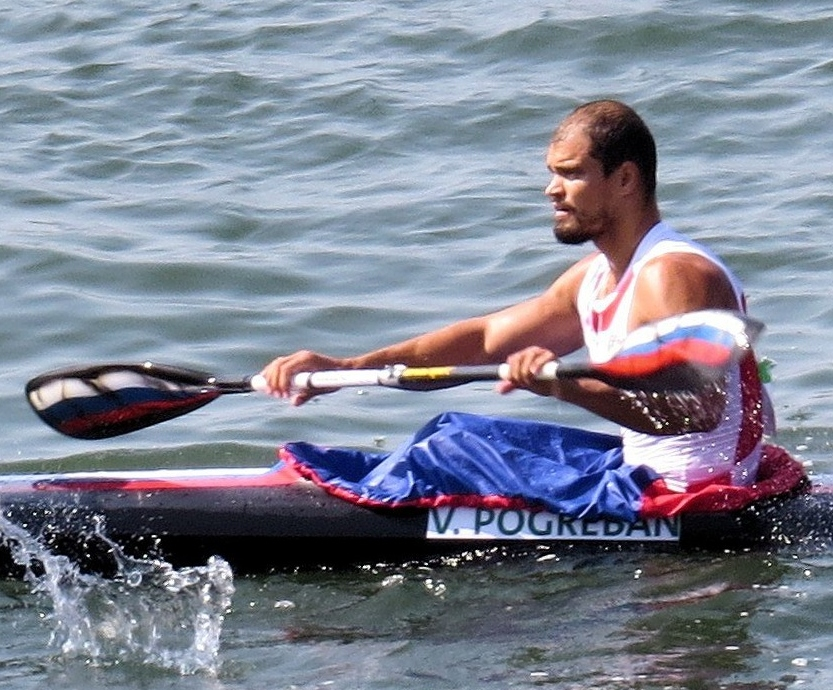
- Pogreban at the 2016 Olympics

Personal information
- Nationality: Russian
- Born: 26 June 1989 (age 37) Grigoriopol, Moldavian SSR, Soviet Union
- Education: Moscow State Academy of Physical Education
- Height: 181 cm (5 ft 11 in)
- Weight: 91 kg (201 lb)

Sport
- Country: Russia
- Sport: Sprint kayak
- Event(s): K–2 500 m, K–2 1000 m, K–4 1000 m
- Club: Dynamo Moscow
- Coached by: Alexander Zhdanov (national)
Medal record
Men's canoe sprint
Representing Russia
World Championships
Gold medal – first place	2013 Duisburg	K-4 1000 m
Silver medal – second place	2019 Szeged	K-4 1000 m
Bronze medal – third place	2011 Szeged	K-2 1000 m
European Games
Silver medal – second place	2015 Baku	K-4 1000 m
European Championships
Silver medal – second place	2011 Belgrade	K-2 1000 m
Silver medal – second place	2016 Moscow	K-4 1000 m
Bronze medal – third place	2018 Belgrade	K-2 500 m
Universiade
Silver medal – second place	2013 Kazan	K-2 1000 m

Vasily Vladimirovich Pogreban (Russian: Василий Владимирович Погребан, born 26 June 1989) is a Russian sprint canoeist. Competing in two-man (K-2) and four-man (K-4) events he won two medals at the world championships, including a gold in 2013, and silver medals at the 2015 European Games and 2016 European Championships. He placed ninth in the K-4 1000 m event at the 2016 Summer Olympics.
