= Bálint Noé =

Hungarian sprint canoeist

Personal information
- Nationality: Hungarian
- Born: 5 October 1993 (age 33)

Sport
- Country: Hungary
- Sport: Sprint kayak
- Club: K-1 5000 m
Medal record
World Championships
| Gold medal – first place | 2021 Copenhagen | K-1 5000 m |
| Bronze medal – third place | 2021 Copenhagen | K-2 1000 m |
| Bronze medal – third place | 2022 Dartmouth | K-2 1000 m |

Bálint Noé (born 5 October 1993) is a Hungarian sprint canoeist.

He competed at the 2021 ICF Canoe Sprint World Championships, winning a gold medal in the K-1 5000 m distance.
