= Linus Bolzern =

Swiss canoeist (born 1999)

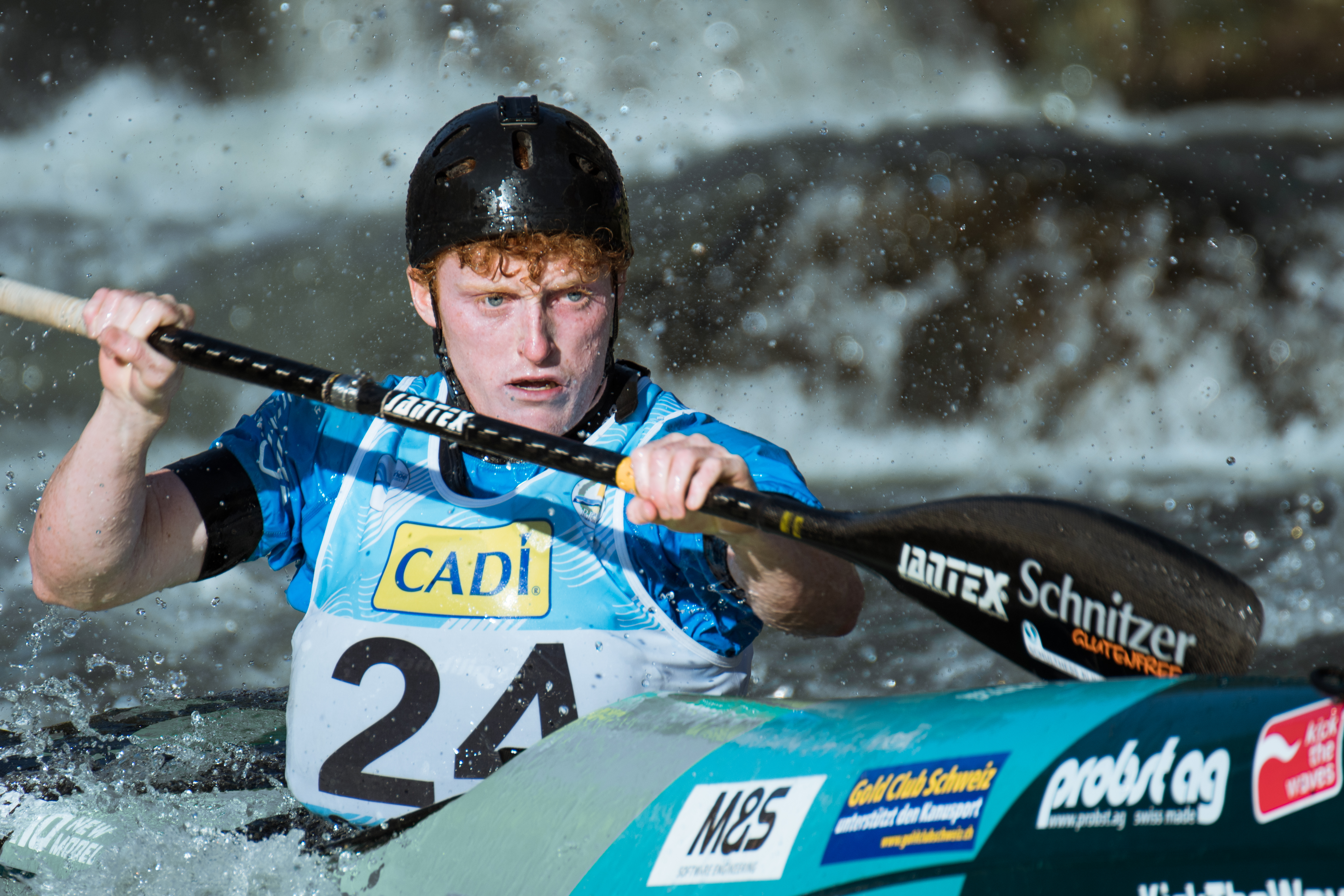

Personal information
- Born: 11 April 1999 (age 27)

Sport
- Country: Switzerland
- Sport: canoeing

Linus Bolzern (born 11 April 1999) is a Swiss male canoeist who was 6th in the K1 sprint senior final at the 2019 Wildwater Canoeing World Championships.
