= Vincent Jourdenais =

Canadian sprint kayaker

Personal information
- Born: April 18, 1997 (age 29) Saint-Jean-sur-Richelieu, Quebec, Canada
Medal record
Men's Kayaking
Representing Canada

Vincent Jourdenais (born April 18, 1997) is a Canadian sprint kayaker. Jourdenais started kayaking in 2007, at the age of 10.

== Career ==
At the 2019 ICF Canoe Sprint World Championships Jourdenais and partner Brian Malfesi finished in 14th place in the K-2 1000 metres.

In May 2021, Jourdenais was named to Canada's 2020 Olympic team.
