= Brian Malfesi =

Canadian sprint kayaker

Personal information
- Born: October 3, 1993 (age 32) Maple Ridge, British Columbia
Medal record
Men's Kayaking
Representing Canada

Brian Malfesi (born October 3, 1993) is a Canadian sprint kayaker.

== Career ==
At the 2019 ICF Canoe Sprint World Championships Malfesi and partner Vincent Jourdenais finished in 14th place in the K-2 1000 metres.

In May 2021, Malfesi was named to Canada's 2020 Olympic team.
