= 2019 ICF Canoe Sprint World Championships =

- Venue: Olympic Centre of Szeged
- Location: Szeged, Hungary
- Dates: 21–25 August

The 2019 ICF Canoe Sprint World Championships, the 45th edition of the World Championships, were held in Szeged, Hungary from 21 to 25 August 2019.

The championships served as the primary qualification regatta for the 2020 Olympic and Paralympic Games in Tokyo.

== Explanation of events ==
Canoe sprint competitions were contested in either a Canadian canoe (C), an open canoe with a single-blade paddle, or in a kayak (K), a closed canoe with a double-bladed paddle. Each canoe or kayak can hold one person (1), two people (2), or four people (4). For each of the specific canoes or kayaks, such as a K-1 (kayak single), the competition distances can be 200, 500, 1000 or 5000 metres. When a competition is listed as a K-2 500m event, for example, it means two people were in a kayak competing over a distance of 500 metres.

Paracanoe competitions were contested in either a va'a (V), an outrigger canoe (which includes a second pontoon) with a single-blade paddle, or in a kayak (as above). All international competitions were held over 200 metres in single-man boats, with three event classes in both types of vessel for men and women depending on the level of an athlete's impairment. The lower the classification number, the more severe the impairment is – for example, VL1 is a va'a competition for those with particularly severe impairments.

== Canoe sprint ==
=== Medal table ===
* Host nation (Hungary)

| Rank | Nation | Gold | Silver | Bronze | Total |
|---|---|---|---|---|---|
| 1 | Belarus | 6 | 4 | 4 | 14 |
| 2 | Germany | 6 | 4 | 1 | 11 |
| 3 | Hungary* | 5 | 4 | 3 | 12 |
| 4 | China | 4 | 0 | 1 | 5 |
| 5 | Russia | 2 | 3 | 1 | 6 |
| 6 | New Zealand | 2 | 0 | 0 | 2 |
| 7 | Spain | 1 | 3 | 3 | 7 |
| 8 | Brazil | 1 | 0 | 1 | 2 |
| 8 | Great Britain | 1 | 0 | 1 | 2 |
| 10 | Lithuania | 1 | 0 | 0 | 1 |
| 10 | United States | 1 | 0 | 0 | 1 |
| 12 | Poland | 0 | 6 | 1 | 7 |
| 13 | Cuba | 0 | 1 | 1 | 2 |
| 13 | Slovenia | 0 | 1 | 1 | 2 |
| 15 | Bulgaria | 0 | 1 | 0 | 1 |
| 15 | Chile | 0 | 1 | 0 | 1 |
| 15 | Czech Republic | 0 | 1 | 0 | 1 |
| 15 | Serbia | 0 | 1 | 0 | 1 |
| 19 | France | 0 | 0 | 2 | 2 |
| 19 | Portugal | 0 | 0 | 2 | 2 |
| 19 | Slovakia | 0 | 0 | 2 | 2 |
| 19 | Uzbekistan | 0 | 0 | 2 | 2 |
| 23 | Denmark | 0 | 0 | 1 | 1 |
| 23 | Georgia | 0 | 0 | 1 | 1 |
| 23 | Mexico | 0 | 0 | 1 | 1 |
| 23 | Moldova | 0 | 0 | 1 | 1 |
| 23 | Ukraine | 0 | 0 | 1 | 1 |
| Totals (27 entries) | | 30 | 30 | 31 | 91 |

Non-Olympic classes

=== Men ===
==== Canoe ====
| Event | Gold | | Silver | | Bronze | |
|---|---|---|---|---|---|---|
| C–1 200 m | Henrikas Žustautas; Lithuania | 39.36 | Artsem Kozyr; Belarus | 40.08 | Zaza Nadiradze; Georgia | 40.24 |
| C–1 500 m | Sebastian Brendel; Germany | 1:53.59 | Angel Kodinov; Bulgaria | 1:54.49 | Oleg Tarnovschi; Moldova | 1:54.94 |
| C–1 1000 m | Isaquias Queiroz; Brazil | 3:59.23 | Tomasz Kaczor; Poland | 4:00.92 | Adrien Bart; France | 4:01.55 |
| C–1 5000 m | Sebastian Brendel; Germany | 22:15.86 | Balázs Adolf; Hungary | 22:19.15 | Fernando Jorge; Cuba | 22:30.46 |
| C–2 200 m | Spain; Alberto Pedrero; Pablo Graña | 36.06 | Poland; Michał Łubniewski; Arsen Śliwiński | 36.18 | Uzbekistan; Artur Guliev; Elyorjon Mamadaliev | 36.42 |
| C–2 500 m | China; Li Qiang; Xing Song | 1:37.33 | Hungary; Jonatán Hajdu; Ádám Fekete | 1:38.41 | Spain; Sete Benavides; Antoni Segura | 1:38.97 |
| C–2 1000 m | China; Liu Hao; Wang Hao | 3:40.55 | Cuba; Serguey Torres; Fernando Jorge | 3:41.46 | Brazil; Erlon Silva; Isaquias Queiroz | 3:44.34 |
| C–4 500 m | Russia; Ivan Shtyl; Pavel Petrov; Viktor Melantyev; Mikhail Pavlov | 1:34.69 | Germany; Jan Vandrey; Conrad-Robin Scheibner; Tim Hecker; Moritz Adam | 1:35.83 | Belarus; Andrei Bahdanovich; Evgeniy Tengel; Maksim Krysko; Vitali Asetski | 1:37.14 |

==== Kayak ====
| Event | Gold | | Silver | | Bronze | |
|---|---|---|---|---|---|---|
| K–1 200 m | Liam Heath; Great Britain | 34.86 | Strahinja Stefanović; Serbia | 35.04 | Carlos Garrote; Spain | 35.12 |
| K–1 500 m | Tom Liebscher; Germany | 1:35.04 WB | Mikita Borykau; Belarus | 1:35.19 | Maxim Spesivtsev; Russia | 1:35.49 |
| K–1 1000 m | Bálint Kopasz; Hungary | 3:36.07 | Josef Dostál; Czech Republic | 3:37.31 | Fernando Pimenta; Portugal | 3:37.63 |
| K–1 5000 m | Aleh Yurenia; Belarus | 19:54.07 | Max Hoff; Germany | 19:57.56 | Fernando Pimenta; Portugal | 20:19.94 |
| K–2 200 m | Russia; Yury Postrigay; Alexander Dyachenko | 33.05 | Poland; Piotr Mazur; Bartosz Grabowski | 33.10 | Hungary; Márk Balaska; Levente Apagyi | 33.30 |
| K–2 500 m | Belarus; Stanislau Daineka; Dzmitry Natynchyk | 1:33.13 | Spain; Pelayo Roza; Pedro Vázquez | 1:33.48 | Germany; Marcus Gross; Martin Hiller | 1:34.50 |
| K–2 1000 m | Germany; Max Hoff; Jacob Schopf | 3:20.53 | Spain; Francisco Cubelos; Íñigo Peña | 3:21.79 | France; Cyrille Carré; Étienne Hubert | 3:22.96 |
| K–4 500 m | Germany; Tom Liebscher; Ronald Rauhe; Max Rendschmidt; Max Lemke | 1:19.26 | Spain; Saúl Craviotto; Carlos Arévalo; Rodrigo Germade; Marcus Walz | 1:19.77 | Slovakia; Erik Vlček; Adam Botek; Csaba Zalka; Samuel Baláž | 1:20.96 |
| K–4 1000 m | Germany; Lukas Reuschenbach; Felix Frank; Jakob Thordsen; Tobias-Pascal Schultz | 2:48.79 | Russia; Vasily Pogreban; Aleksei Vostrikov; Oleg Siniavin; Igor Kalashnikov | 2:49.78 | Slovakia; Gábor Jakubík; Juraj Tarr; Denis Myšák; Ákos Gacsal | 2:50.44 |

=== Women ===
Non-Olympic classes

==== Canoe ====
| Event | Gold | | Silver | | Bronze | |
|---|---|---|---|---|---|---|
| C–1 200 m | Nevin Harrison; United States | 49.30 | Olesia Romasenko; Russia | 49.74 | Alena Nazdrova; Belarus | 49.99 |
| C–1 500 m | Alena Nazdrova; Belarus | 2:00.73 WB | Ksenia Kurach; Russia | 2:01.64 | Anastasiia Chetverikova; Ukraine | 2:03.83 |
| C–1 5000 m | Volha Klimava; Belarus | 25:34.67 | María Mailliard; Chile | 25:56.41 | Zhang Yajue; China | 26:14.90 |
| C–2 200 m | China; Lin Wenjun; Zhang Luqi | 44.69 | Hungary; Kincső Takács; Virág Balla | 45.16 | Uzbekistan; Dilnoza Rakhmatova; Nilufar Zokirova | 46.60 |
| C–2 500 m | China; Sun Mengya; Xu Shixiao | 2:02.81 | Hungary; Kincső Takács; Virág Balla | 2:04.49 | Belarus; Volha Klimava; Nadzeya Makarchanka | 2:07.74 |

==== Kayak ====
| Event | Gold | | Silver | | Bronze | |
|---|---|---|---|---|---|---|
| K–1 200 m | Lisa Carrington; New Zealand | 39.39 | Marta Walczykiewicz; Poland | 41.33 | Emma Jørgensen; Denmark | 41.34 |
| K–1 200 m | Lisa Carrington; New Zealand | 39.39 | Marta Walczykiewicz; Poland | 41.33 | Teresa Portela; Spain | 41.34 |
| K–1 500 m | Lisa Carrington; New Zealand | 1:55.76 | Volha Khudzenka; Belarus | 1:57.39 | Danuta Kozák; Hungary | 1:58.01 |
| K–1 1000 m | Tamara Csipes; Hungary | 4:07.90 | Justyna Iskrzycka; Poland | 4:09.26 | Lizzie Broughton; Great Britain | 4:10.44 |
| K–1 5000 m | Dóra Bodonyi; Hungary | 22:03.23 | Tabea Medert; Germany | 22:03.85 | Maryna Litvinchuk; Belarus | 22:04.08 |
| K–2 200 m | Belarus; Maryna Litvinchuk; Volha Khudzenka | 36.21 | Slovenia; Špela Ponomarenko Janić; Anja Osterman | 36.72 | Hungary; Blanka Kiss; Anna Lucz | 36.97 |
| K–2 500 m | Belarus; Maryna Litvinchuk; Volha Khudzenka | 1:42.55 | Poland; Karolina Naja; Anna Puławska | 1:43.34 | Slovenia; Špela Ponomarenko Janić; Anja Osterman | 1:44.21 |
| K–2 1000 m | Hungary; Erika Medveczky; Réka Hagymási | 3:34.23 | Germany; Tabea Medert; Sarah Brüßler | 3:35.59 | Mexico; Karina Alanís; Maricela Montemayor | 3:40.91 |
| K–4 500 m | Hungary; Dóra Bodonyi; Erika Medveczky; Tamara Csipes; Alida Dóra Gazsó | 1:32.91 | Belarus; Maryna Litvinchuk; Volha Khudzenka; Nadzeya Liapeshka; Marharyta Makhneva | 1:33.69 | Poland; Karolina Naja; Anna Puławska; Katarzyna Kołodziejczyk; Helena Wiśniewska | 1:34.77 |

== Paracanoe ==
=== Medal table ===
* Host nation (Hungary)

| Rank | Nation | Gold | Silver | Bronze | Total |
|---|---|---|---|---|---|
| 1 | Great Britain | 3 | 2 | 1 | 6 |
| 2 | Ukraine | 3 | 0 | 1 | 4 |
| 3 | Australia | 2 | 1 | 1 | 4 |
| 4 | Brazil | 1 | 1 | 2 | 4 |
| 5 | Hungary* | 1 | 0 | 0 | 1 |
| 5 | Japan | 1 | 0 | 0 | 1 |
| 5 | Uzbekistan | 1 | 0 | 0 | 1 |
| 8 | Germany | 0 | 3 | 0 | 3 |
| 9 | Russia | 0 | 2 | 1 | 3 |
| 10 | Italy | 0 | 2 | 0 | 2 |
| 11 | Portugal | 0 | 1 | 0 | 1 |
| 12 | Chile | 0 | 0 | 2 | 2 |
| 13 | Iran | 0 | 0 | 1 | 1 |
| 13 | New Zealand | 0 | 0 | 1 | 1 |
| 13 | Poland | 0 | 0 | 1 | 1 |
| Totals (15 entries) | | 12 | 12 | 11 | 35 |

=== Medal events ===
Non-Paralympic classes

| Event | Gold | | Silver | | Bronze | |
|---|---|---|---|---|---|---|
| Men's KL1 | Péter Pál Kiss; Hungary | 45.42 | Esteban Farias; Italy | 46.17 | Luis Carlos Cardoso da Silva; Brazil | 46.49 |
| Men's KL2 | Curtis McGrath; Australia | 42.35 | Federico Mancarella; Italy | 42.80 | Scott Martlew; New Zealand | 43.51 |
| Men's KL3 | Serhii Yemelianov; Ukraine | 40.03 | Leonid Krylov; Russia | 40.56 | Caio Riberio de Carvalho; Brazil | 40.70 |
| Men's VL1 | Mykola Fedorenko; Ukraine | 1:05.18 | Peter Happ; Germany | 1:07.81 | Robinson Méndez; Chile | 1:14.27 |
| Men's VL2 | Luis Carlos Cardoso da Silva; Brazil | 51.68 | Norberto Mourao; Portugal | 52.82 | Jakub Tokarz; Poland | 53.21 |
| Men's VL3 | Curtis McGrath; Australia | 47.42 | Caio Riberio de Carvalho; Brazil | 47.52 | Stuart Wood; Great Britain | 48.42 |
| Women's KL1 | Maryna Mazhula; Ukraine | 55.99 | Edina Müller; Germany | 56.97 | Katherinne Wollermann; Chile | 58.03 |
| Women's KL2 | Charlotte Henshaw; Great Britain | 47.62 | Emma Wiggs; Great Britain | 49.03 | Susan Seipel; Australia | 51.12 |
| Women's KL3 | Shakhnoza Mirzaeva; Uzbekistan | 47.29 | Laura Sugar; Great Britain | 47.32 | Shahla Behrouzirad; Iran | 48.96 |
| Women's VL1 | Monika Seryu; Japan | 1:14.56 | Esther Bode; Germany | 1:35.66 | not awarded as there were only 2 entries | |
| Women's VL2 | Emma Wiggs; Great Britain | 56.10 | Susan Seipel; Australia | 57.74 | Maria Nikiforova; Russia | 59.24 |
| Women's VL3 | Charlotte Henshaw; Great Britain | 56.82 | Larisa Volik; Russia | 57.84 | Nataliia Lagutenko; Ukraine | 59.07 |

== Doping violation ==
On 19 August, the ICF announced that 11-time world champion Laurence Vincent-Lapointe was provisionally suspended from competition after testing positive for a banned substance. The substance in question was subsequently found to be Ligandrol, with Canoe Kayak Canada stating Ligandrol had been associated with recent tainted supplements and that preliminary information suggested Vincent-Lapointe's positive may have been the result of such.
