= Ákos Gacsal =

Slovak canoeist

Personal information
- Nationality: Hungarian/Slovak
- Born: 19 January 1994 (age 32) Komárno, Slovakia
- Height: 1.87 m (6 ft 2 in)
- Weight: 88 kg (194 lb)

Sport
- Country: Slovakia
- Sport: Sprint kayak
- Event: K–4 1000 m
- Club: Dukla
Medal record
Men's canoe sprint
Representing Slovakia
World Championships
Bronze medal – third place	2019 Szeged	K-4 1000 m

Ákos Gacsal (born 19 January 1994) is a Hungarian-born Slovak sprint canoeist.

He won a medal at the 2019 ICF Canoe Sprint World Championships.
