= Pedro Vázquez (canoeist) =

Spanish sprint canoeist

Personal information
- Full name: Pedro Vázquez Llenin
- Nationality: Spanish
- Born: 6 August 1996 (age 29)

Sport
- Country: Spain
- Sport: Sprint kayak
Medal record
Men's canoe sprint
Representing Spain
World Championships
Gold medal – first place	2023 Duisburg	K-2 1000 m
Silver medal – second place	2019 Szeged	K-2 500 m
European Championships
Silver medal – second place	2022 Munich	K-4 1000 m
Bronze medal – third place	2024 Szeged	K-4 1000 m

Pedro Vázquez Llenin (born 6 August 1996) is a Spanish sprint canoeist.

He won a medal at the 2019 ICF Canoe Sprint World Championships.
