= Oleksandr Syromiatnykov =

Ukrainian canoeist (born 1994)

Personal information
- Nationality: Ukrainian
- Born: 12 July 1994 (age 32)
- Height: 176 cm (5 ft 9 in)
- Weight: 80 kg (176 lb)

Sport
- Country: Ukraine
- Sport: Canoe sprint
Medal record
Men's canoe sprint
Representing Ukraine
European Games
| Silver medal – second place | 2019 Minsk | K-2 1000 m |

Oleksandr Syromiatnykov (born July 12, 1994, in Ukraine) is a Ukrainian sprint canoer. He is a silver medalist of the 2019 European Games.
